= Coimbra =

City in Portugal

- Municipality
- City of Coimbra
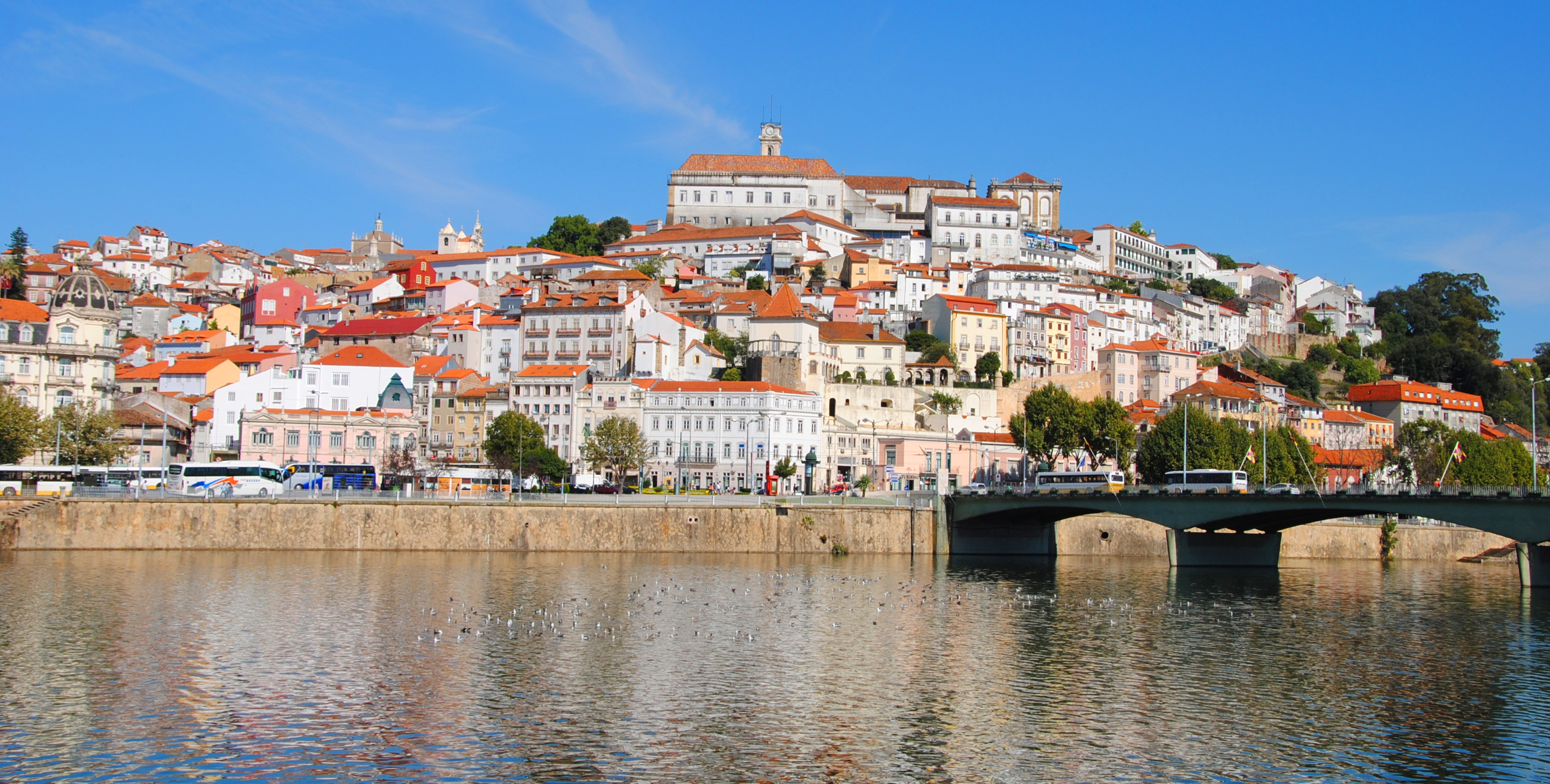
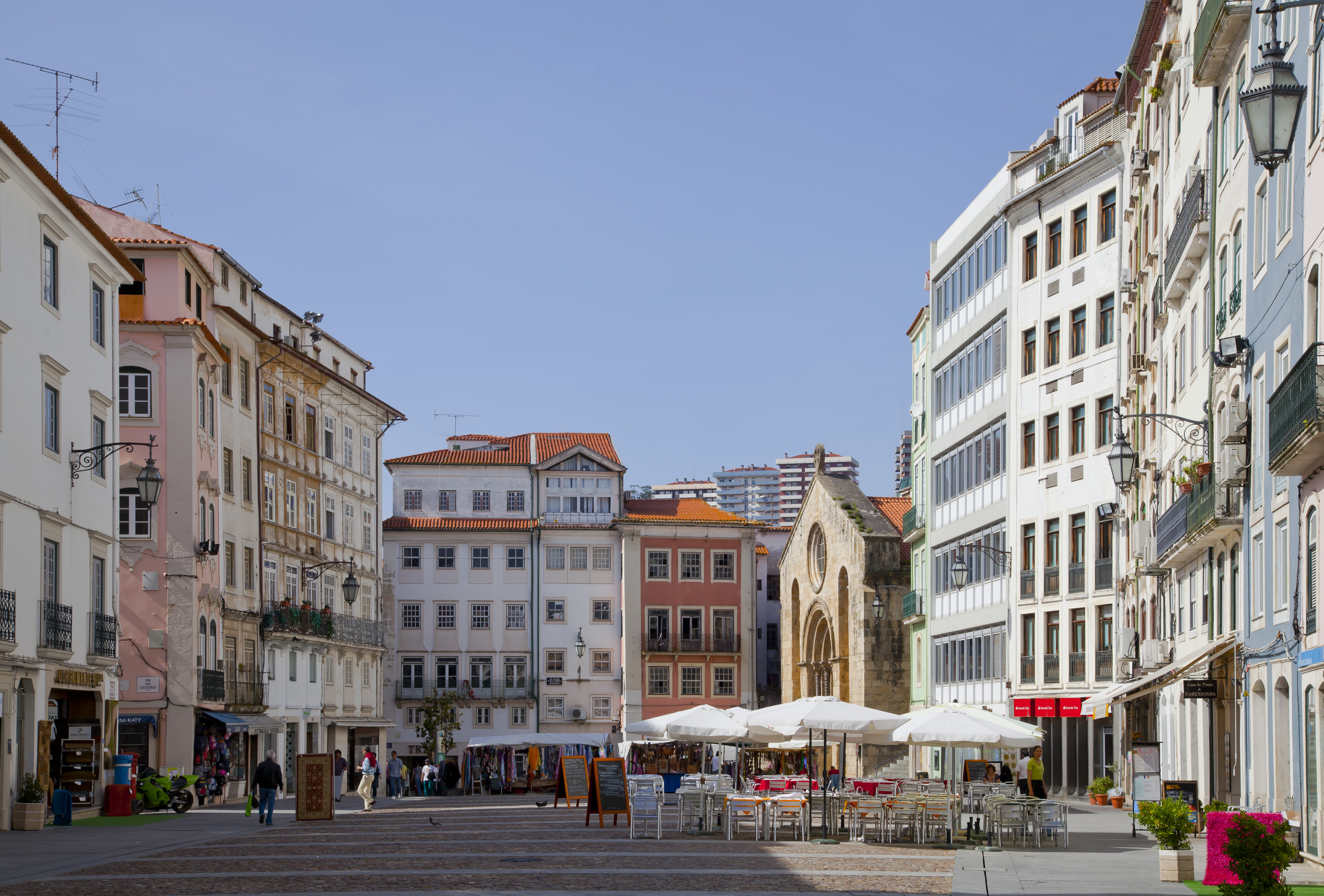
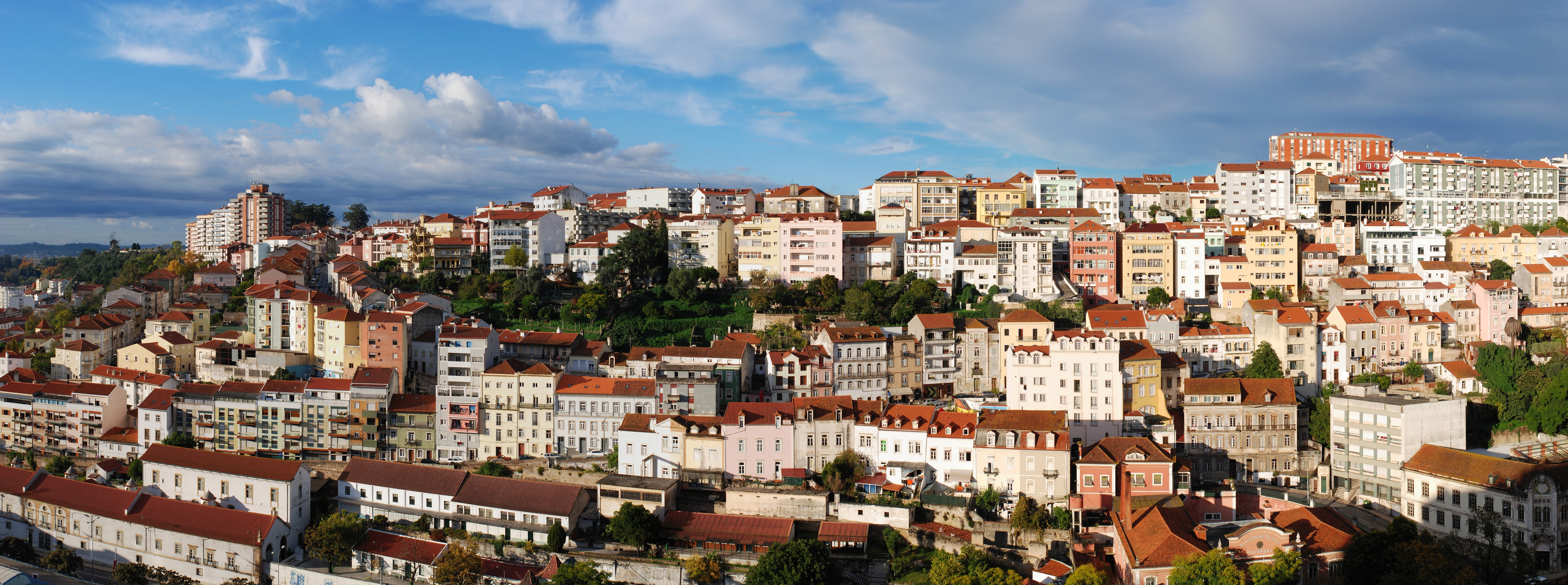
- View of Coimbra from the Mondego River Coimbra baixa University of Coimbra Santa Cruz Monastery New Cathedral of Coimbra Panorama of Coimbra from near the University

- Flag Coat of arms
- Interactive map of Coimbra
- Location within Portugal Location within Europe
- Coordinates: 40°12′10″N 8°24′50″W
- Country: Portugal
- Region: Central Portugal
- Subregion: Coimbra
- District: Coimbra
- Historical province: Beira
- Foral: 26 May 1111; 915 years ago
- Seat: Coimbra Municipal Chamber
- Civil parishes: 18

Government
  - Type: Local administrative unit
  - Body: Câmara municipal
  - Mayor: Ana Abrunhosa (PS)
  - Assembly chair: Maria Manuel de Lemos Leitão Marques

Area
  - Total: 319.40 km^{2} (123.32 sq mi)
- Highest elevation: 499 m (1,637 ft)
- Lowest elevation: 9 m (30 ft)

Population (2021)
  - Total: 140,796
  - Rank: 6th
  - Density: 440.81/km^{2} (1,141.7/sq mi)
- Demonym: Conimbricense
- Time zone: UTC (WET)
  - Summer (DST): UTC+1 (WEST)
- Postal code: 3000-XXX Coimbra
- Area code: (+351) 239
- Patron Saint: Elizabeth of Portugal, T.O.S.F.
- Municipal Holiday: 4 July (City day)
- Website: Câmara Municipal de Coimbra

Coimbra, (Note: /koʊˈɪmbrə/, also US: /ku-, ˈkwɪmbrə/, UK: /ˈkɔɪmbrə/, Portuguese: [kuˈĩbɾɐ] or [ˈkwĩbɾɐ]) officially the City of Coimbra, (Note: Cidade de Coimbra) is a city and a municipality in Portugal. The population of the municipality at the 2021 census was 140,796, in an area of around 319.40 square kilometres (123.3 sq mi). It is the fourth-largest metropolitan area in Portugal after Lisbon, Porto, and Braga, and it is the largest city of the district of Coimbra and the Central Region, and about 460,000 people live in its intermunicipal community.

Among the many archaeological structures dating back to the Roman era, when Coimbra was the settlement of Aeminium, are its well-preserved aqueduct and cryptoporticus. Similarly, buildings from the period when Coimbra was the capital of Portugal (from 1131 to 1255) still remain. During the late Middle Ages, with its decline as the political centre of the Kingdom of Portugal, Coimbra began to evolve into a major cultural centre. This was in large part helped by the establishment of the first Portuguese university in 1290 in Lisbon and its relocation to Coimbra in 1308, making it the oldest academic institution in the Portuguese-speaking world. Apart from attracting many European and international students, the university is visited by many tourists for its monuments and history. Its historical buildings were classified as a World Heritage site by UNESCO in 2013: "Coimbra offers an outstanding example of an integrated university city with a specific urban typology as well as its own ceremonial and cultural traditions that have been kept alive through the ages."

== History ==
=== Roman Republic ===
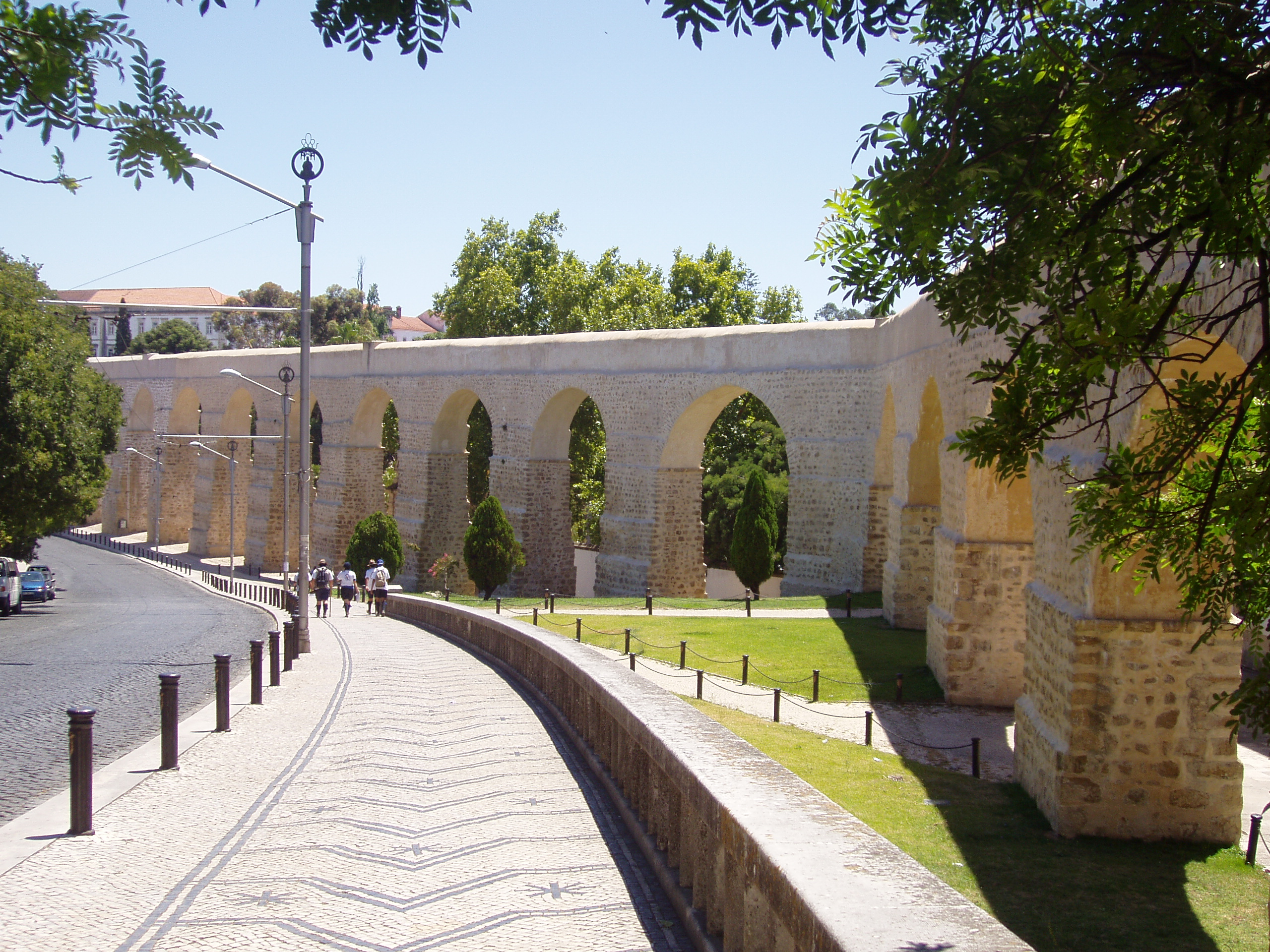
Arcos do Jardim, built between 1568 and 1570 on the remains of a Roman aqueduct

The city, located on a hill by the Mondego River, was called Aeminium in Roman times. The Romans founded the civitas of Aeminium in this place at the time of Augustus (63 BC – AD 14), which came under the protection of nearby Conímbriga (in Condeixa-a-Nova), some 15 kilometres (9.3 mi) to the south. The Roman city was encircled by a wall, and followed an orthogonal plan, with the cardo maximus and decumanus maximus crossing at the Forum. An aqueduct existed, the remains of which were incorporated into a latter medieval renovation. Aeminium fell under the influence, administratively, of the larger city of Conímbriga, until the latter was sacked by the Sueves and Visigoths between 465-8 and abandoned. It became the seat of a diocesis, replacing Conímbriga.

Although Conímbriga had been administratively important, Aeminium affirmed its position by being situated at the confluence of the north-south traffic that connected the Roman Bracara Augusta (Roman name of Braga) and Olisipo (Roman name of Lisbon) with its waterway, which enabled connections with the interior and coast. The limestone table on which the settlement grew has a dominant position overlooking the Mondego, circled by fertile lands irrigated by its waters. Vestiges of this early history include the cryptoporticus of the former Roman forum (now part of the Machado de Castro National Museum). The move of the settlement and bishopric of Conimbriga to Aeminium resulted in the name change to Conimbriga, evolving later to Colimbria.

=== Suebi, Alans and Visigoths ===
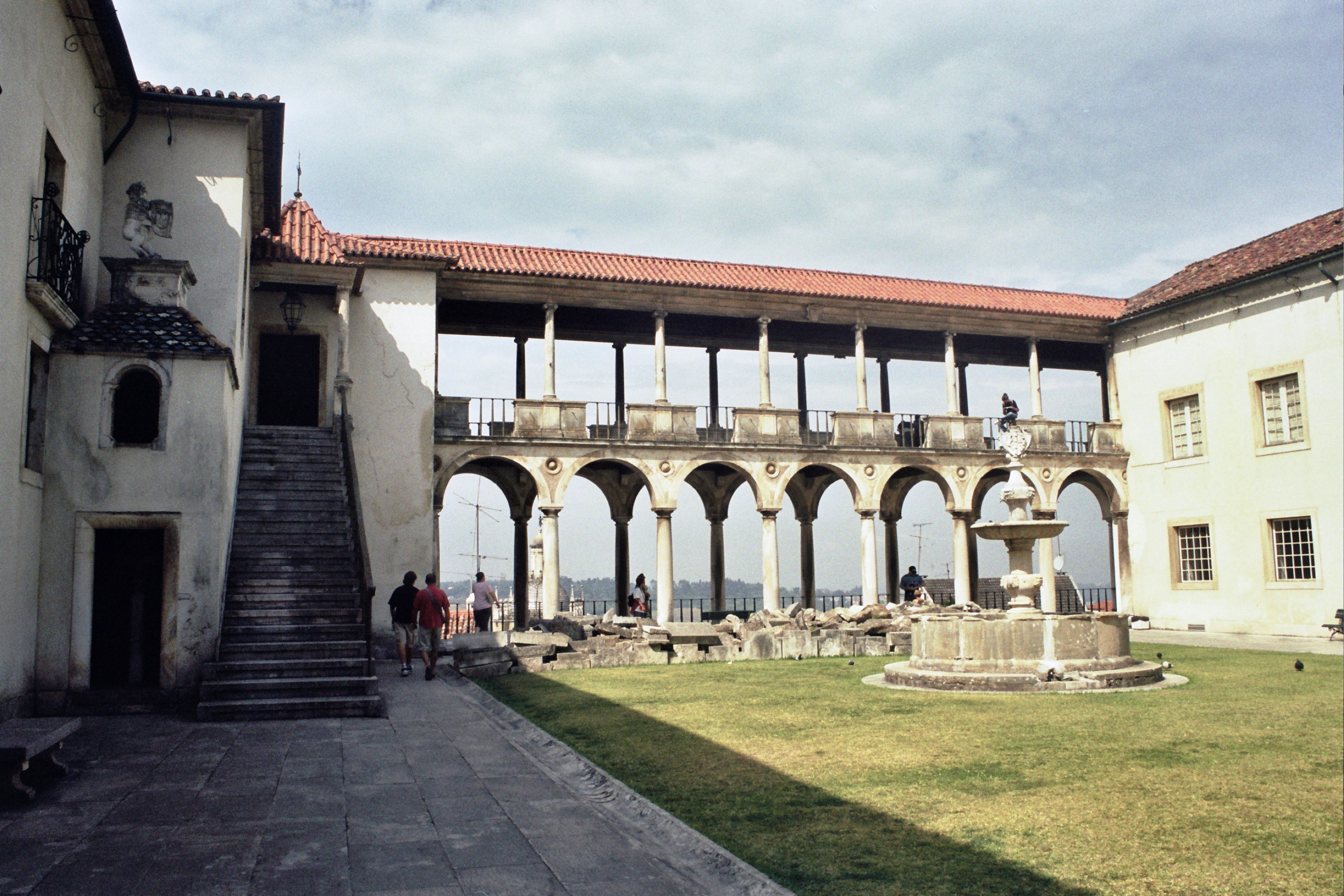
Machado de Castro National Museum

After being subjected to the Roman Empire for a long time, a deluge of barbarians flooded the Iberian Peninsula in 409, and the Lower Mondego area recognised Hermeric, the landlord of the Suebi, as its ruler. But the ambition to gain territory drove Ataces, king of the Alans, to take Coimbra from Hermeric. Later chronicles describe the rule of Ataces, king of the Alans, including semi-legendary accounts of forced labour and the symbolic marriage between his house and that of the Suebi.. Ataces converted to Christianity, but being arian by sect persecuted catholics with ferocity. The prisoners were either beheaded before the walls of the new city, their bodies serving as foundations, or employed like cargo donkeys in its construction. Nobody escaped the tyranny of Ataces: he ordered everyone to work on the construction of the walls. Elipando, the holy Bishop of Coimbra was also there holding the stone and the clay for the works of the city. "Passing by the new Coimbra (says Arisberto, Bishop of Porto, writing to Samerico, Archbishop of Braga), there I saw working in the construction of their walls many Ministers of God; among them, at the orders of Ataces, was also Bishop Elipando: I cried with them for their misfortune and for the loss of this fertile province of the Roman Empire." Hermeric of the northern Kingdom of the Suebi, whose the capital was Bracara Augusta (former name of Braga), did not lose hope of rescuing the lands that had been taken by Ataces in the south. He crossed the Douro river and appeared with his army before the new walls of Coimbra. But Ataces triumphed and followed Hermeric's retreating army to the banks of Douro, further north, where the Suebi landlord would buy from him, in exchange for his daughter, peace and an alliance. Ataces, crowned with the laurels of victory continued with great fervor the rebuilding of the city he had plundered before. Hermeric visited him in Colimbria bringing him his daughter, princess Cindazunda, who had been flourishing in age and beauty.

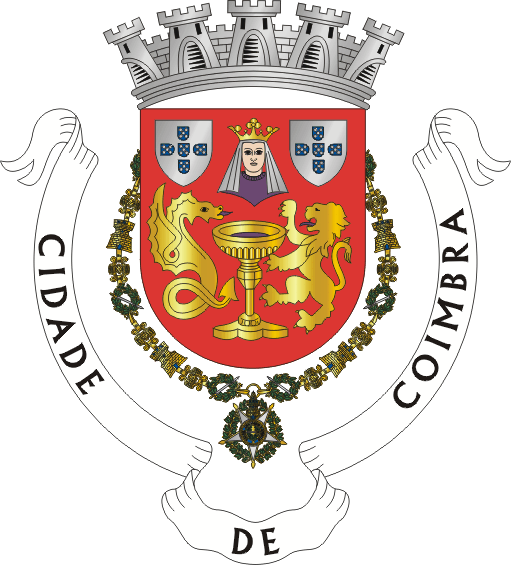
The coat of arms of Coimbra is said to be inspired on Cindazunda, Hermeric's daughter. The legendary symbolism of the lion is tied to Ataces, ruler of the Alans, and that of the serpent is tied to Hermeric, ruler of the Suebi.

Ataces, in order to show his gratitude had the picture of his new wife placed in a vase, with a serpent on one side and a lion walking towards her on the other. Those were the insignias of Ataces (lion) and Hermeric (serpent). Cindazunda had her eyes lifted up the sky and her hands raised as if thanking the Eternal for having been the medium between the father and the husband and having united with bonds of peace and friendship the serpent and the lion, up until that moment, enemies. As the walls and towers of the city were being built, the workers carved on the stones this insignia so pleasant to the King, that until today, has been the coat of arms of Coimbra. Cindazunda, professing Catholicism, established the bonds of peace between the two kings and improved the fortunes of the inhabitants of Coimbra mitigating the ferocious spirit of Ataces against the catholics. The Visigoths would conquer the region later. During the Visigothic era (from the 5th to the early 8th century), the County of Coimbra was created by king Wittiza (c. 687 – probably 710) and it was a sub-county of his dominion, established as a fief for his son prince Ardabast (or Sisebuto), with its seat in Emínio (the Visigothic name for Coimbra), which persisted until the Muslim invasion from the south.

=== Islamic Era ===
The first Muslim campaigns that occupied the Iberian Peninsula occurred between 711 and 715, with Coimbra capitulating to Musa bin Nusair in 714. Although it was not a large settlement, Qulumriyah (Arabic: قُلُمْرِيَة), in the context of Al-Andalus, was the largest agglomerated centre along the northern Tagus valley, and its principal city boasted a walled enclosure of 10 hectares, supporting between 3000 and 5000 inhabitants. Remnants of this period include the beginnings of the Almedina, Arrabalde and the fortified palace used by the city's governor (which was later converted into the Royal Palace by the early Portuguese monarchs). The Christian Reconquista forced the Banu Dānis and the other Muslims to flee the region. The Moors rearmed and managed to retake the castle in 987–1064 and again in 1116, capturing two castles constructed to protect the territory: in Miranda da Beira (where the garrison was slaughtered) and in Santa Eulália (where the governor surrendered his forces rather than facing a similar massacre). The Christian armies however, continued pushing south until they reached the Algarve and expelled the last Muslim outposts.

=== Middle Ages ===
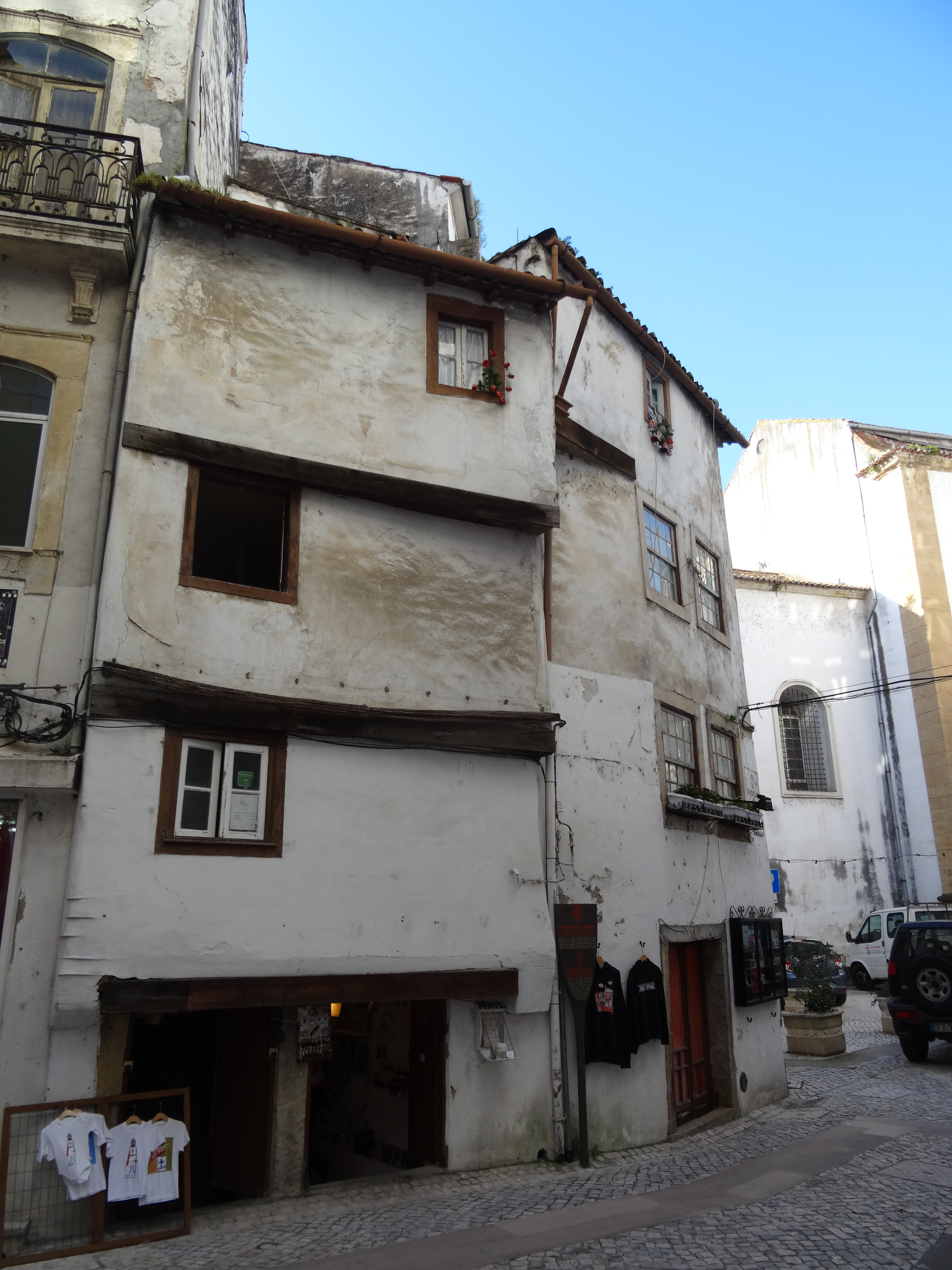
Medieval houses "sobrado" in Coimbra.

The reconquest of the territory was attained in 1064 by King Ferdinand I of León and Castile, who appointed Dom Sisnando Davides to reorganize the economy and administer the lands encircling the city. The County of Portucale and the County of Coimbra were later integrated into one dominion under the stewardship of Henry of Burgundy by Alfonso VI of León and Castile in 1096, when Henry married Alfonso's illegitimate daughter Theresa. Henry expanded the frontiers of the County, confronting the Moorish forces, and upon his death in 1112, Theresa, Countess of Portucale and Coimbra, unified her possessions. Their son, Afonso Henriques, who took up residence in the ancient seat of the Christian County of Coimbra, sent expeditions to the south and west, consolidating a network of castles that included Leiria, Soure, Rabaçal, Alvorge and Ansião.

During the 12th century, Afonso Henriques administered an area of fertile lands with river access and protected by a fortified city, whose population exceeded 6000 inhabitants, including magnates, knights and high clergy. The young Infante encouraged the construction of his seat, funding the Santa Cruz Monastery (the most important Portuguese monastic institution at the time, founded in 1131 by Theotonius), promoted the construction of the Old Cathedral, reconstructed the original Roman bridge in 1132, and repaired and renovated fountains, kilns, roads and stone pavements, as well as the walls of the old city. In order to confirm and reinforce the power of the concelho (municipality) he conceded a formal foral (charter) in 1179.

Already in the Middle Ages, Coimbra was divided into an upper city (Cidade Alta), where the aristocracy and the clergy lived, and the merchant, artisan and labour centres in the lower city (Cidade Baixa) by the Mondego River, in addition to the old and new Jewish quarters. The city was encircled by a fortified wall, of which some remnants are still visible like the Almedina Gate (Porta da Almedina).

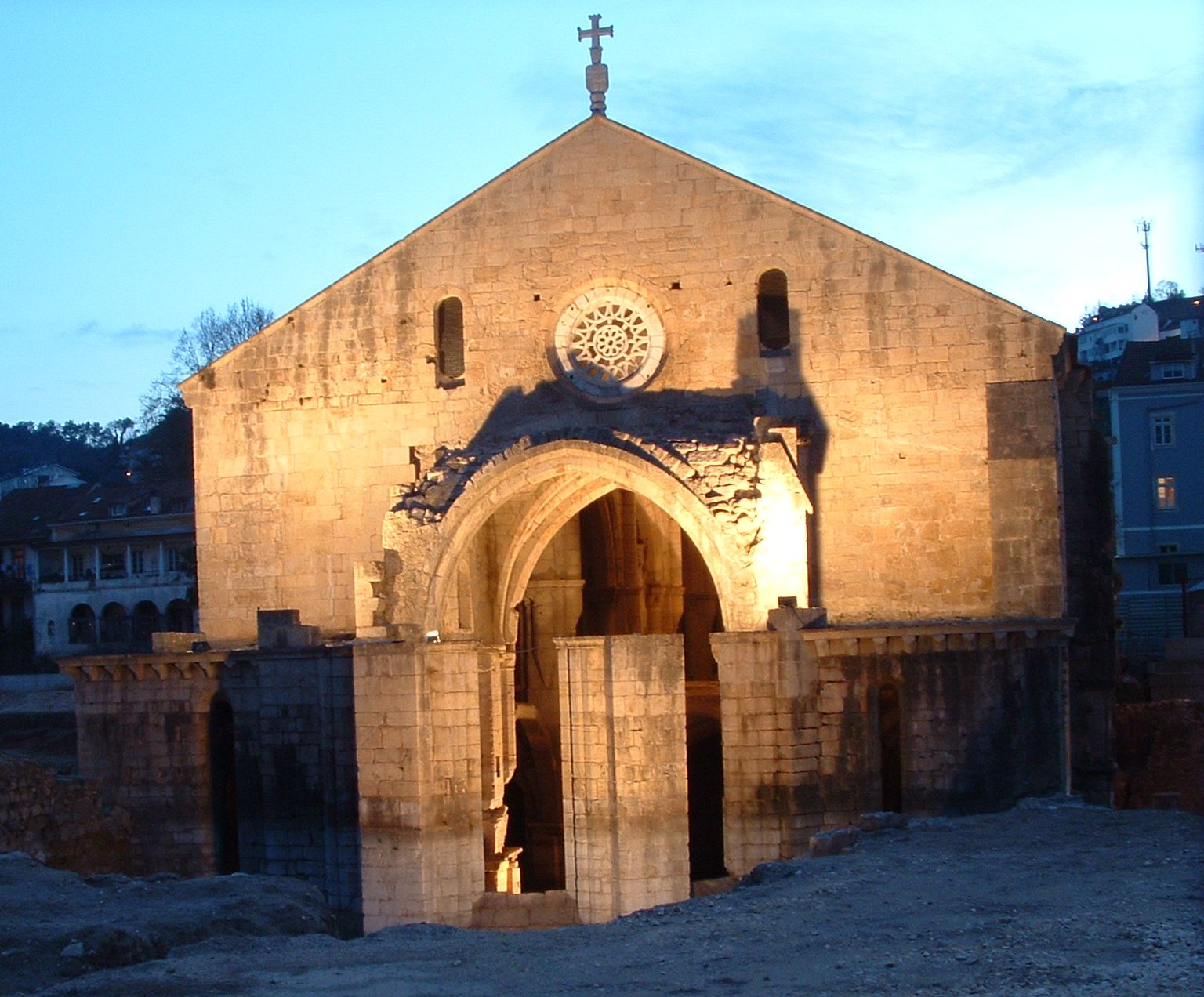
Monastery of Santa Clara-a-Velha, refounded in 1314 by Queen Elizabeth of Portugal as a convent of Poor Clares in the parish of Santa Clara

Meanwhile, on the periphery, the municipality began to grow in various agglomerations, notably around the monasteries and convents that developed in Celas, Santa Clara, Santo António dos Olivais. The most important work in Gothic style in the city is the Monastery of Santa Clara-a-Velha, founded on the left side of the river Mondego by Queen Elizabeth of Portugal in the first half of the 14th century. It stood too close to the river, and frequent floods forced the nuns to abandon it in the 17th century, when the Monastery of Santa Clara-a-Nova was built uphill. The Queen's magnificent Gothic tomb was also transferred to the new convent. The ruins of the old convent were excavated in the 2000s, and can be seen today on the left bank of the river.

=== Renaissance ===
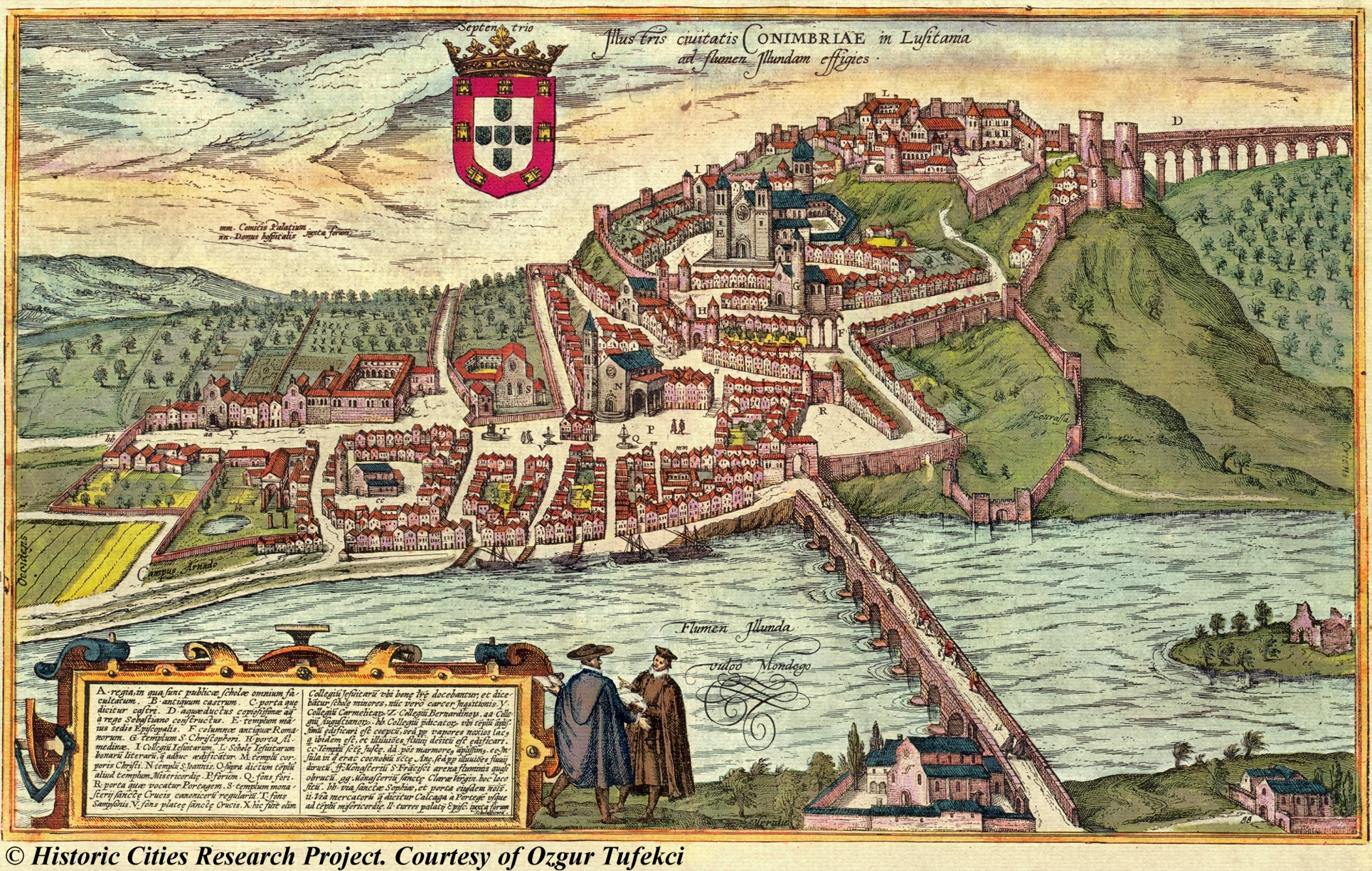
Coimbra by Frans Hogenberg ca. 1598

In the 15th and 16th centuries, during the Age of Discovery, Coimbra was again one of the main artistic centres of Portugal thanks to both local and royal patronage. Coimbra bishops, religious orders and King Manuel I supported artists like Diogo Pires (father and son), Marcos Pires, João de Castilho, Diogo de Castilho and the Frenchmen, João de Ruão and Nicholas of Chanterene, among others, who left important Manueline and Renaissance works in the town. Dating from this period are the remodelling (in Manueline style) of the Santa Cruz Monastery, including the tombs of Kings Afonso Henriques and Sancho I, the Renaissance Manga Fountain, and the altarpieces and triumphal portal of the Old Cathedral, among other works.

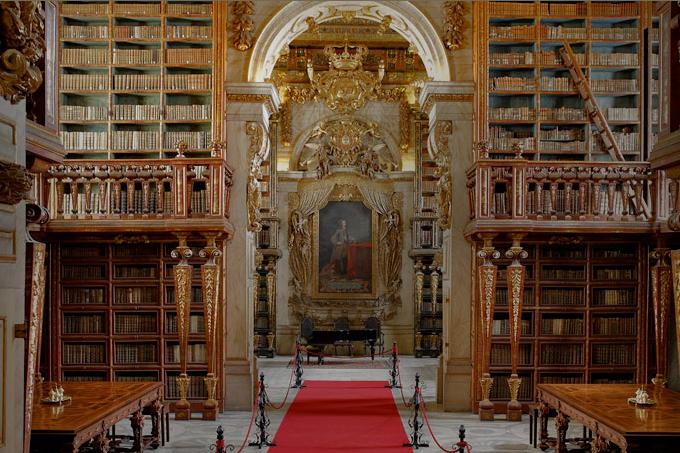
The interior stacks of the Joanine Library, one of the oldest collections in Portugal

The University of Coimbra, was founded as a Studium Generale in Lisbon in 1290 by King Dinis I. The university was relocated to Coimbra in 1308, but in 1338 King D. Afonso IV returned the university to Lisbon. The university was definitively transferred to the premises of Coimbra Royal Palace in 1537 by King John III, and expanded by 1544 to occupy the Coimbra Royal Palace. Since then, city life has revolved around the state-run university. For many decades, several colleges (colégios) established by the religious orders provided an alternative to the official institution, but were gradually discontinued with the secularization of education in Portugal. Built in the 18th century, the Joanina Library (Biblioteca Joanina), a Baroque library, is another notable landmark of the ancient university. The Baroque University Tower (Torre da Universidade) designed by António Canevari and built between 1728 and 1733, is an iconic monument of the city.

=== Baroque and modern ===
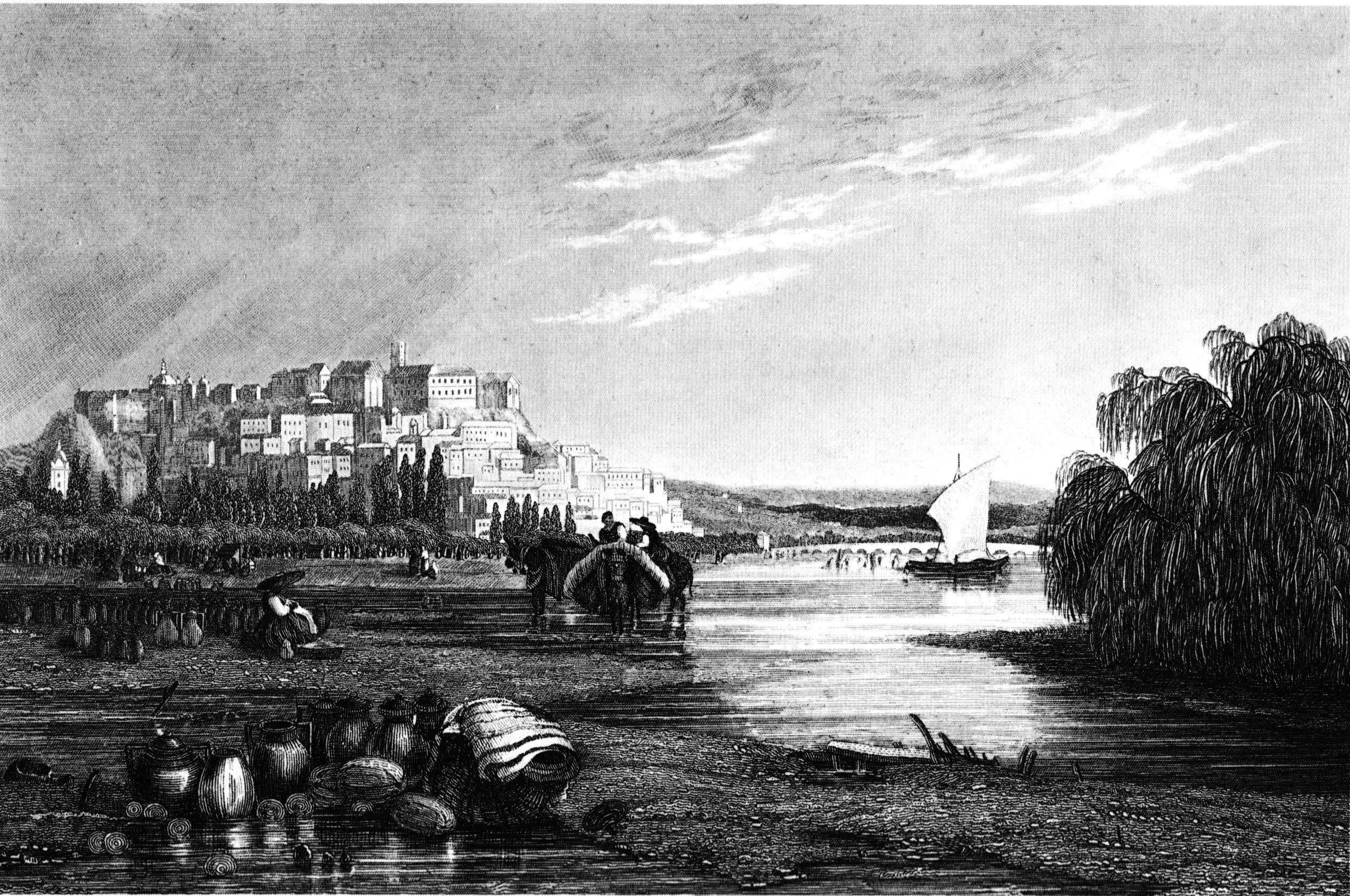
Rural life in the periphery and parishes of Coimbra around 1839, seen from the fields of São Martinho do Bispo

In 1772, the Marquis of Pombal, prime minister of King José I, undertook a major reform of the university, where the study of the sciences assumed vast importance. The collections of scientific instruments and material acquired then are now gathered in the Science Museum of the University of Coimbra, and constitute one of the most important historical science collections in Europe. However, his desire to modernize the university resulted in the complete demolition of Coimbra's medieval city walls and castle, very little of which remains today. In the same year, Luísa de Jesus, a local 23-year-old woman, was sentenced to death for multiple infanticide becoming the last woman to be executed in the country's history. She is also considered the deadliest serial killer in Portuguese crime history.

The first half of the 19th century was a difficult period for Coimbra, being invaded by French troops under the command of Andoche Junot and André Masséna during the Peninsular War. A force of 4,000 Portuguese militia led by Nicholas Trant dealt Masséna a heavy blow when it recaptured the city on 6 October 1810. In March 1811, the militia successfully held the place against the retreating French army. The city recovered in the second half of the 19th century with infrastructure improvements like the telegraph, gas light, the railway system, a railway bridge over the Mondego River and the renovation of the Portela bridge, in addition to the broadening of roads and expansion of the city into the Quinta de Santa Cruz.

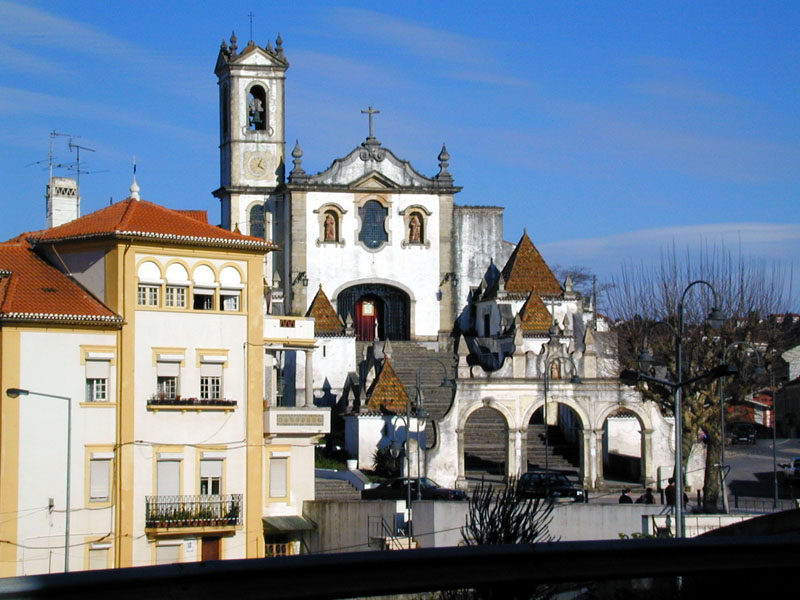
The Church of Santo António dos Olivais, in the parish of the same name.

By 1854, with the expulsion of the religious orders and municipal reforms, the need to reorganize the municipality of Coimbra forced some changes in the existing structure of the administrative divisions. Consequently, documents were sent (on 20 January 1854) to the Ministries of Ecclesiastical Affairs (Portuguese: Ministério dos Negócios Eclesiásticos) and Justice (Portuguese: Ministério de Justiça) urging the identification by the Civil Governor and Archbishop of Coimbra (Manuel Bento Rodrigues) of the number of civil parishes to preserve, their limits, the political organs to be retained, a local census and other statistics to justify the demarcation of the territory. A commission of five members, which included João Maria Baptista Callixto, António dos Santos Pereira Jardim, Roque Joaquim Fernandes Thomás, João Correia Ayres de Campos and António Egypcio Quaresma Lopes de Carvalho e Vasconcelos, was appointed to produce a plan to reduce, suppress, demarcate and establish civil parishes in the city of Coimbra and its suburbs.

=== Republic ===
On 1 January 1911, electric tramways were inaugurated to connect the old quarter with its expanding periphery, which included the residential areas of Celas, Olivais, Penedo da Saudade and Calhabé, all located in the civil parish of Santo António dos Olivais. This was only the initiation of the municipality growth. Civil construction projects throughout the region marked the economic activity of the territory, with new areas such as Montes Claros, Arregaça, Cumeada and Calhabé growing in the shadow of the city. Even projects that had been planned at the end of the 19th century gained new initiative, including the expansion of the Santa Cruz neighbourhood (bairro), the demolition of the residential area of the Alta de Coimbra (1940–50) to expand the university, and construction or expansion of the bairros of Celas, Sete Fontes and Marechal Carmona (now the bairro of Norton de Matos).

== Geography ==
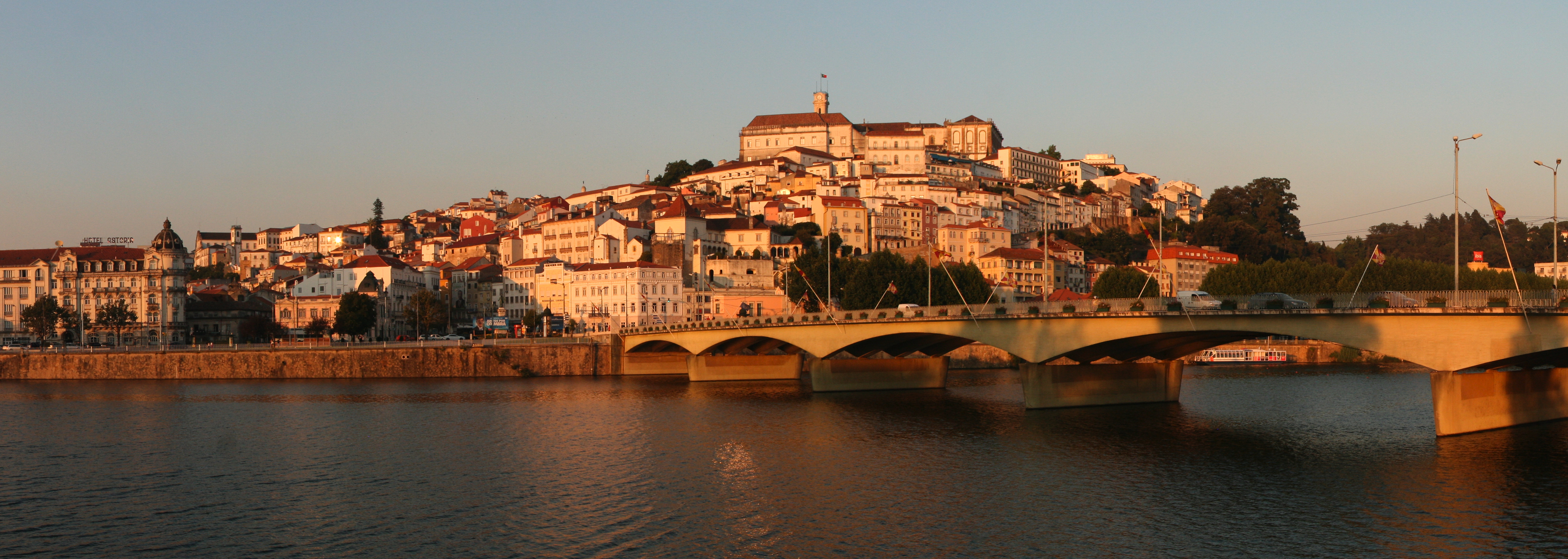
Mondego River and Coimbra

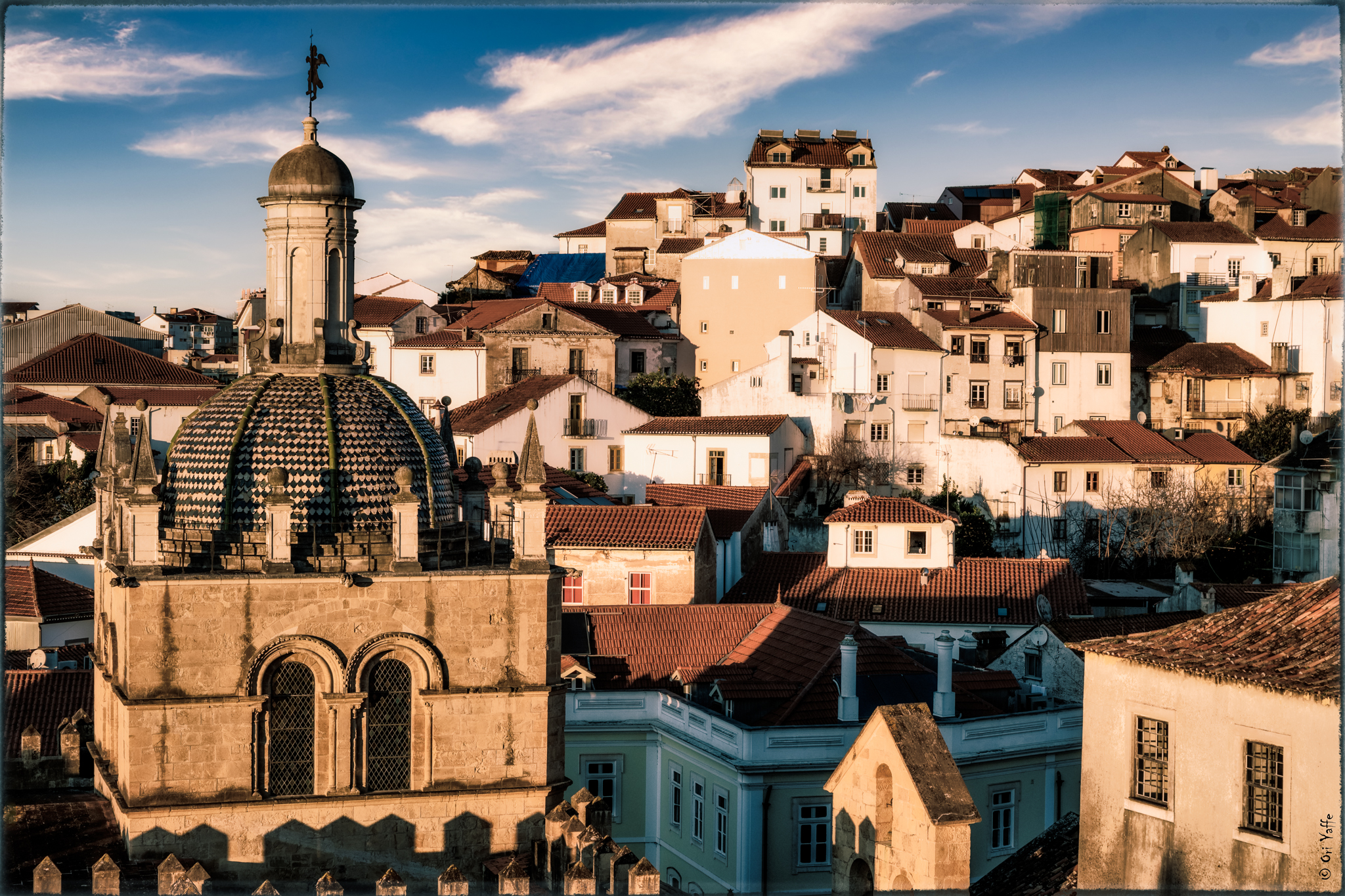
view over one of Coimbra hills

One of the nation's most important crossroads, Coimbra was historically at a junction between Braga and Lisbon, and its river access (the Mondego flows through the municipality) provided a route between the interior communities and the coastal towns (including the seaside city of Figueira da Foz, 40 km (25 mi) west of Coimbra). The historic city of Coimbra is located centrally within the municipality, connected to Lisbon (197 km (122 mi)) and Porto (116 km (72 mi)) by the IC2, IP3 and A1 motorways.

The municipality is circled by several of its neighbouring municipalities in the Região de Coimbra, which include Penacova (in the northeast), Vila Nova de Poiares (to the east), Miranda do Corvo (to the southeast), Condeixa-a-Nova (to the south and southwest), Montemor-o-Velho (to the west), Cantanhede (to the northwest) and Mealhada (in the north and northeast). Just outside the municipality, there are also several picturesque mountain towns such as Lousã and Penacova, while spa towns and villages, such as Luso, Buçaco and Curia are commonplace.

Although it ceased serving as the capital of Portugal in the 13th century, Coimbra retains considerable importance as the centre of the former Beira province, now designated the Centro region. It is considered alongside Braga one of the two most important regional centres in Portugal outside the Lisbon and Portos metropoles, the centre for the whole middle region of the country. With a dense urban grid, the municipality is known primarily for the city of Coimbra, itself famous for its monuments, churches, libraries, museums, parks, nightlife, healthcare and shopping facilities. Above all, its cultural life, oriented around the University of Coimbra, has historically attracted the nation's notable writers, artists, academics and aristocracy, securing its reputation as the Lusa-Atenas (Lusitanian Athens).

=== Ecoregions/protected areas ===
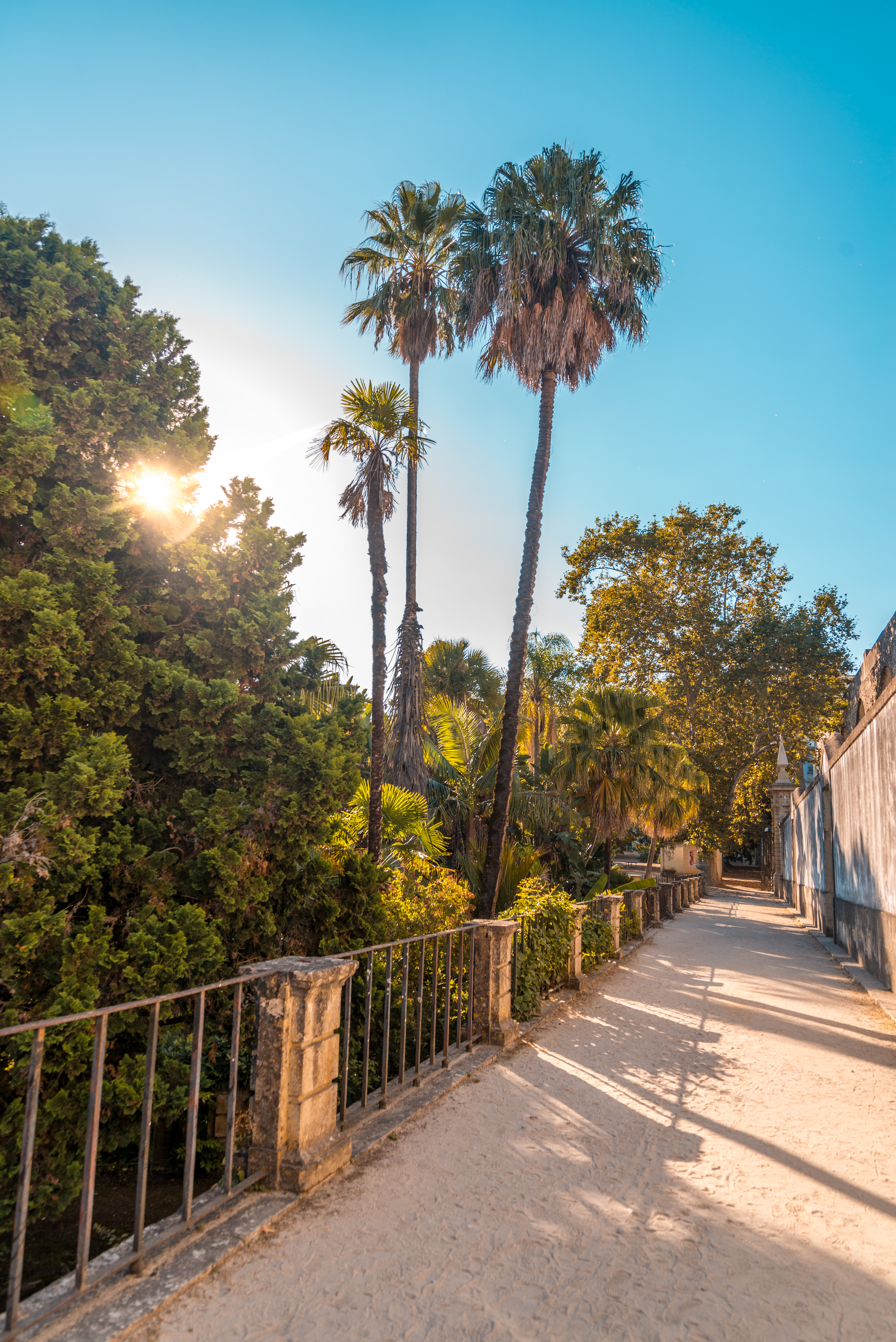
Aspect of the Botanical Garden of the University of Coimbra

The western edge of Coimbra is covered by the Reserva Natural do Paul de Arzila (Arzila Swamp Natural Reserve), which is designated both as a Special Protection Zone (Portuguese: Zona de Protecção Especial) and Special Conservation Zone (Portuguese: Zona Especial de Conservação), coincident with the civil parish of Arzila (sometimes referred to as the Paul de Arzila or marsh of Arzila). It is a wetland that has sheltered migratory birds, and supports other animal and plant species; this has included predominantly avian species, such as the: Eurasian reed warbler (Acrocephalus scirpaceus), sedge warbler (Acrocephalus schoenobaenus), melodious warbler (Hippolais polyglotta), willow warbler (Phylloscopus trochilus), little bittern (Ixobrychus minutus), great reed warbler (Acrocephalus arundinaceus), and the Savi's warbler (Locustella luscinioides). The 482 hectare area, under threat from industrial, residential and agricultural pollution, expansion of aquatic plants and eutrophication, has forced the governmental reorganization of land use in order to promote models of sustainability, and rural use that does not affect the migratory and aquatic bird populations.

The municipal government has also promoted the installation and maintenance of various parks, playgrounds, gardens and forests, including the development of the Botanical Garden of the University of Coimbra (considered the fifth oldest in the world), the Mata Nacional do Choupal, the Mata Nacional de Vale de Canas, Jardim da Sereia (also known as Santa Cruz Garden), Penedo da Saudade, Parque Manuel Braga, Parque Verde do Mondego, Choupalinho, and the 19th century Quinta das Lágrimas estate and gardens.

Complementing these natural spaces are the riverside parks and bathing areas that line the Mondego, including the river beaches of Palheiros do Zorro, in the parish of Torres do Mondego.

The city is on the Portuguese Way of the Road of St James (Caminho de Santiago).

=== Climate ===
Coimbra has a warm-summer Mediterranean climate (Köppen: Csb, Trewartha: Csbl).

In winter, temperatures range between 15–16 °C (59–61 °F) at day and 5–7 °C (41–45 °F) at night, occasionally dropping below 0 °C (32 °F), with an average of 19 days with frost per year; while summer temperatures range between 28–29 °C (82–84 °F) at day and 15–16 °C (59–61 °F) at night and can reach 40 °C (104 °F) or more in hotter days. Coimbra has around 32 days a year with maximum temperatures above 30 °C (86 °F). The highest and lowest temperatures ever recorded were 42.5 °C (108.5 °F) and −7.8 °C (18.0 °F) in 1943 and 1941.

Precipitation is abundant throughout the year, except for July and August.

Despite being relatively distant from the coast, Coimbra also has a marked Atlantic influence due to the floodplain of the Mondego River which crosses the city, making both its winters and summers milder than they would otherwise be. This influence also makes cold waves less frequent and less intense, however, days with negative minimum temperatures and cold waves are still present occasionally. Topography is also an important factor to consider in regard to nighttime temperatures, the presence of cold air lakes, in topographically depressed areas at certain synoptic situations, can also lead to pronounced colder temperatures.

Climate data for Coimbra (Mesura), 1991-2020 normals, extremes (1971-2020)
| Month | Jan | Feb | Mar | Apr | May | Jun | Jul | Aug | Sep | Oct | Nov | Dec | Year |
|---|---|---|---|---|---|---|---|---|---|---|---|---|---|
| Record high °C (°F) | 23.5 (74.3) | 26.3 (79.3) | 30.2 (86.4) | 33.0 (91.4) | 37.5 (99.5) | 41.6 (106.9) | 40.5 (104.9) | 41.3 (106.3) | 40.8 (105.4) | 35.8 (96.4) | 27.2 (81.0) | 25.2 (77.4) | 41.6 (106.9) |
| Mean daily maximum °C (°F) | 15.0 (59.0) | 16.4 (61.5) | 19.1 (66.4) | 20.5 (68.9) | 23.3 (73.9) | 26.3 (79.3) | 27.6 (81.7) | 28.6 (83.5) | 27.4 (81.3) | 23.2 (73.8) | 18.0 (64.4) | 15.6 (60.1) | 21.8 (71.1) |
| Daily mean °C (°F) | 10.1 (50.2) | 11.0 (51.8) | 13.5 (56.3) | 14.9 (58.8) | 17.6 (63.7) | 20.3 (68.5) | 21.2 (70.2) | 21.9 (71.4) | 20.7 (69.3) | 17.6 (63.7) | 13.2 (55.8) | 10.9 (51.6) | 16.1 (60.9) |
| Mean daily minimum °C (°F) | 5.2 (41.4) | 5.5 (41.9) | 7.8 (46.0) | 9.4 (48.9) | 11.8 (53.2) | 14.2 (57.6) | 15.4 (59.7) | 16 (61) | 14.1 (57.4) | 11.9 (53.4) | 8.3 (46.9) | 6.2 (43.2) | 10.5 (50.9) |
| Record low °C (°F) | −4.9 (23.2) | −4.0 (24.8) | −3.3 (26.1) | −1.5 (29.3) | 2.0 (35.6) | 4.1 (39.4) | 6.8 (44.2) | 6.0 (42.8) | 2.0 (35.6) | −2.6 (27.3) | −3.1 (26.4) | −2.8 (27.0) | −4.9 (23.2) |
| Average precipitation mm (inches) | 113.5 (4.47) | 81.0 (3.19) | 75.4 (2.97) | 84.6 (3.33) | 64.7 (2.55) | 26.0 (1.02) | 8.9 (0.35) | 14.8 (0.58) | 49.9 (1.96) | 114.5 (4.51) | 121.5 (4.78) | 111.3 (4.38) | 866.1 (34.09) |
| Average precipitation days (≥ 1 mm) | 11.3 | 8.6 | 9.4 | 10.6 | 8.5 | 3.7 | 1.7 | 2.2 | 5.2 | 10.3 | 11.5 | 11.1 | 94.1 |
Source: IPMA

Climate data for Coimbra, 1961-1990 normals and extremes
| Month | Jan | Feb | Mar | Apr | May | Jun | Jul | Aug | Sep | Oct | Nov | Dec | Year |
|---|---|---|---|---|---|---|---|---|---|---|---|---|---|
| Record high °C (°F) | 22.5 (72.5) | 24.6 (76.3) | 28.6 (83.5) | 29.2 (84.6) | 38.0 (100.4) | 42.3 (108.1) | 40.3 (104.5) | 42.3 (108.1) | 40.6 (105.1) | 33.8 (92.8) | 30.4 (86.7) | 24.4 (75.9) | 42.3 (108.1) |
| Mean daily maximum °C (°F) | 14.2 (57.6) | 15.4 (59.7) | 17.7 (63.9) | 19.3 (66.7) | 22.0 (71.6) | 25.6 (78.1) | 28.4 (83.1) | 28.7 (83.7) | 27.2 (81.0) | 22.6 (72.7) | 17.5 (63.5) | 14.5 (58.1) | 21.1 (70.0) |
| Daily mean °C (°F) | 10.0 (50.0) | 11.0 (51.8) | 12.5 (54.5) | 14.0 (57.2) | 16.4 (61.5) | 19.6 (67.3) | 21.8 (71.2) | 21.8 (71.2) | 20.8 (69.4) | 17.4 (63.3) | 13.0 (55.4) | 10.4 (50.7) | 15.7 (60.3) |
| Mean daily minimum °C (°F) | 5.7 (42.3) | 6.5 (43.7) | 7.3 (45.1) | 8.6 (47.5) | 10.8 (51.4) | 13.6 (56.5) | 15.3 (59.5) | 14.9 (58.8) | 14.3 (57.7) | 12.1 (53.8) | 8.5 (47.3) | 6.4 (43.5) | 10.3 (50.6) |
| Record low °C (°F) | −3.8 (25.2) | −3.4 (25.9) | −1.6 (29.1) | 0.4 (32.7) | 3.3 (37.9) | 5.6 (42.1) | 9.2 (48.6) | 8.2 (46.8) | 4.3 (39.7) | 1.2 (34.2) | −0.8 (30.6) | −2.9 (26.8) | −3.8 (25.2) |
| Average precipitation mm (inches) | 138 (5.4) | 139 (5.5) | 88 (3.5) | 91 (3.6) | 78 (3.1) | 51 (2.0) | 15 (0.6) | 13 (0.5) | 47 (1.9) | 97 (3.8) | 128 (5.0) | 129 (5.1) | 1,014 (40) |
| Average precipitation days (≥ 1.0 mm) | 13 | 12 | 10 | 11 | 9 | 6 | 2 | 2 | 6 | 10 | 11 | 11 | 103 |
| Average relative humidity (%) | 79 | 77 | 72 | 73 | 71 | 70 | 68 | 67 | 69 | 73 | 77 | 78 | 73 |
| Mean monthly sunshine hours | 138 | 137 | 191 | 203 | 249 | 261 | 302 | 300 | 228 | 185 | 147 | 139 | 2,480 |
Source: NOAA

=== Human geography ===
Map showing the 31 civil parishes of the municipality of Coimbra before the reorganization of 2013.

Administratively, the municipality is divided into 18 civil parishes (freguesias):

- Almalaguês
- Antuzede e Vil de Matos
- Assafarge e Antanhol
- Brasfemes
- Ceira
- Cernache
- Coimbra (Sé Nova, Santa Cruz, Almedina e São Bartolomeu)
- Eiras e São Paulo de Frades
- São João do Campo
- São Martinho de Árvore e Lamarosa
- São Martinho do Bispo e Ribeira de Frades
- São Silvestre
- Souselas e Botão
- Santa Clara e Castelo Viegas
- Santo António dos Olivais
- Taveiro, Ameal e Arzila
- Torres do Mondego
- Trouxemil e Torre de Vilela

Population of the municipality of Coimbra (1802–2021)
| Year | Pop. | ±% |
|---|---|---|
| 1802 | 46,343 | — |
| 1849 | 32,517 | −29.8% |
| 1900 | 54,105 | +66.4% |
| 1930 | 76,494 | +41.4% |
| 1960 | 106,404 | +39.1% |
| 1981 | 138,930 | +30.6% |
| 1991 | 139,052 | +0.1% |
| 2001 | 148,443 | +6.8% |
| 2008 | 135,314 | −8.8% |
| 2011 | 143,052 | +5.7% |
| 2021 | 140,796 | −1.6% |

As of 2021, the municipality of Coimbra had a population of 140,796 inhabitants (covering an area of 319.4 km^{2}), reflecting just a 1.3% increase relative to 1991 (139,052 residents), while the number of families increased 17.1% in the same period. This was mainly concentrated in the parish of Sé Nova, while the remaining administrative divisions accounted for a range of 78.54 to 5069.2 inhabitants per kilometre square. Seniors and youth (age 0 to 14 years) represent a minority of the population (16.5% and 31.1%); the 25 to 64 cohort accounts for 55% of the active population. While per 100 inhabitants, seniors actually comprise 21.6% of this population, the birth rate (9.3%) is superior the mortality rate in the communities of Coimbra, which is actually greater than other municipalities in the Baixo Mondego subregion.

The municipality of Coimbra has a resident population of 157,510 inhabitants, and seasonal population of approximately 200,000 residents. Between 1864 and 2001, the municipal population tripled (following the trend in the rest of the country when the nation's population doubled), while between 1991 and 2001 its population increased 6.75% (Portugal's population increased 4.08% in the same period). On average, over 43,000 people flow to Coimbra every day to study and work. About 460,000 inhabitants live in the Região de Coimbra, consisting of 19 municipalities comprising a territory of 4,336 square kilometres (1,674 sq mi).

Internally, the network and location of public service/sector institutions (such as police stations, fire stations, public finance and notary services) have been located within 5.2 to 6.6 km (3.2 to 4.1 miles) of the resident population, while most tertiary shops and retail capture between 43.4% and 100% of the market. Mini-markets and corner shops cover 100% of the population; generally, the longest distance travelled between shops is 8.7 km (5.4 mi) (for pastry shops). Restaurants are usually within 74.2% of the population, and refreshment shops (such as bars and snack bars) routinely cover 100% of the market. Commerce and vestuary shops range from coverage of 43.4% (for glasses) to 91.4% (of clothing); the largest distance that resident population requires to travel is 10.2 km (6.3 mi) for electro-domestics and auto-mobile purchases. Repair services, which cover the largest part of the civil parishes, and specifically auto repair shops, cover 97.1% of the market. Public transport covers 90.3% of the parishes, with 93.5% of the population; 61.3% have taxi services (capturing 78.8% of the population); public buses serve 67.7% of the parishes (or 85% of the population); while rail services affect 35.5% of the parishes (serving 29.7% of the market); while unequipped parishes, on average, lie within 4.8 km (3.0 mi) of such services. Postal services are provided in 15 parishes (48.4%), corresponding to 77.9% of the population, while 98.6% receive home distribution. Similarly, public telephones have a 94.6% coverage of the population.

== Economy ==
The wealth of the city rests mostly on the University of Coimbra with about 28,000 students – the city has a total of over 38,000 higher education students considering the other higher education institutions based there – but also in shopping, technology and health sciences industry, administrative offices, financial services, law firms and specialised medical care. The city has many private clinics, medical offices and two large state-run hospital centres: the H.U.C. – Hospitais da Universidade de Coimbra, which is a university hospital, and the C.H.C. – Centro Hospitalar de Coimbra, which includes a general hospital. Coimbra has also the regional branch of the national cancer hospital – the I.P.O. – Instituto Português de Oncologia, as well as a military hospital. The Instituto Nacional de Medicina Legal, the state-run forensic science institute of Portugal, is headquartered in Coimbra.

Notable companies based in the municipality of Coimbra include software companies Critical Software and Ciberbit which have their global headquarters in the city, mechanical and electronics engineering company Active Space Technologies, data science company Feedzai, telemetry and Machine to Machine company ISA, Cimpor's cement factory in Souselas (CIMPOR Souselas), the pan-European service facility of Olympus Corporation, the pharmaceuticals companies Bluepharma and BASI, the iron foundry Fucoli-Somepal and several ceramics, food processing (Probar produces cold meat products and Dan Cake produces sponge cakes and swiss rolls), textiles, wine, civil and engineering construction, architecture, public works and housing construction firms. Handicraft industry is well represented by traditional tapestry and pottery manufacture, and the surroundings of the city have besides forestry, dynamic horticulture production, vineyards and livestock raising. The Instituto Pedro Nunes (Pedro Nunes Institute), a business incubator, dynamically hosts several start-ups which are usually dedicated to technology-related businesses and become independent spin-off companies headquartered across the whole region. There is a move by municipal authorities to bring in more innovation and high-technology businesses, through initiatives such as the Coimbra Innovation Park, with the objective of promoting innovation and companies that promote research and development (such as nanotechnology company Innovnano, a subsidiary of Companhia União Fabril).

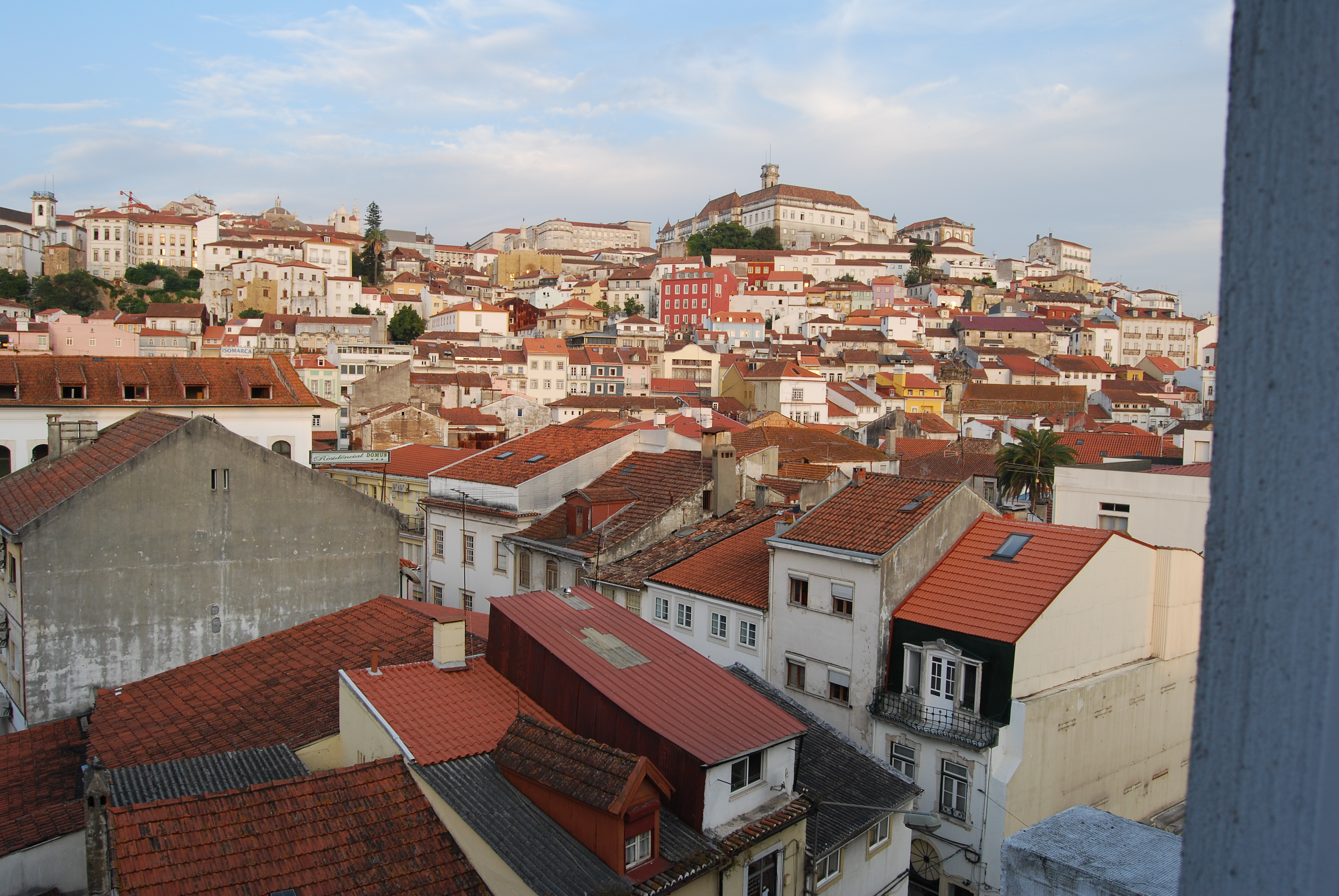
The familiar urban landscape of the Baixa (Downtown), showing the distinctive hill of the Almedina and Sé Nova that became University Hill, seen from Downtown

Coimbra has a fresh produce open-air market on every 7th and 23rd days of the month at Feira dos 7 e dos 23, and a large fresh produce market in downtown at Mercado D. Pedro V. The Baixa (downtown) of Coimbra has many coffeehouses and bakeries, and features several specialty shops selling all kind of products in typical old-fashioned architectural surroundings. Large commercial facilities with car park, include a medium-sized shopping centre (CoimbraShopping); two larger shopping centres with hypermarket, restaurants, movie theaters and several shops with a selection of some of Portugal's and the world's most famous and stylish international brands include the Alma shopping center (formerly called Dolce Vita Coimbra) designed by the American planning and design firm, Suttle Mindlin and Forum Coimbra; and two retail parks found on the fringes of the city, offering an alternative to the busy city centre (Retail Park Mondego in Taveiro, and Coimbra Retail Park in Eiras). Dolce Vita Coimbra (renamed Alma) was the recipient of the 2006 MIPIM International Design Award; the 2006 ICSC International Design Award; and the 2006 ICSC European Design Award.

== Transportation ==
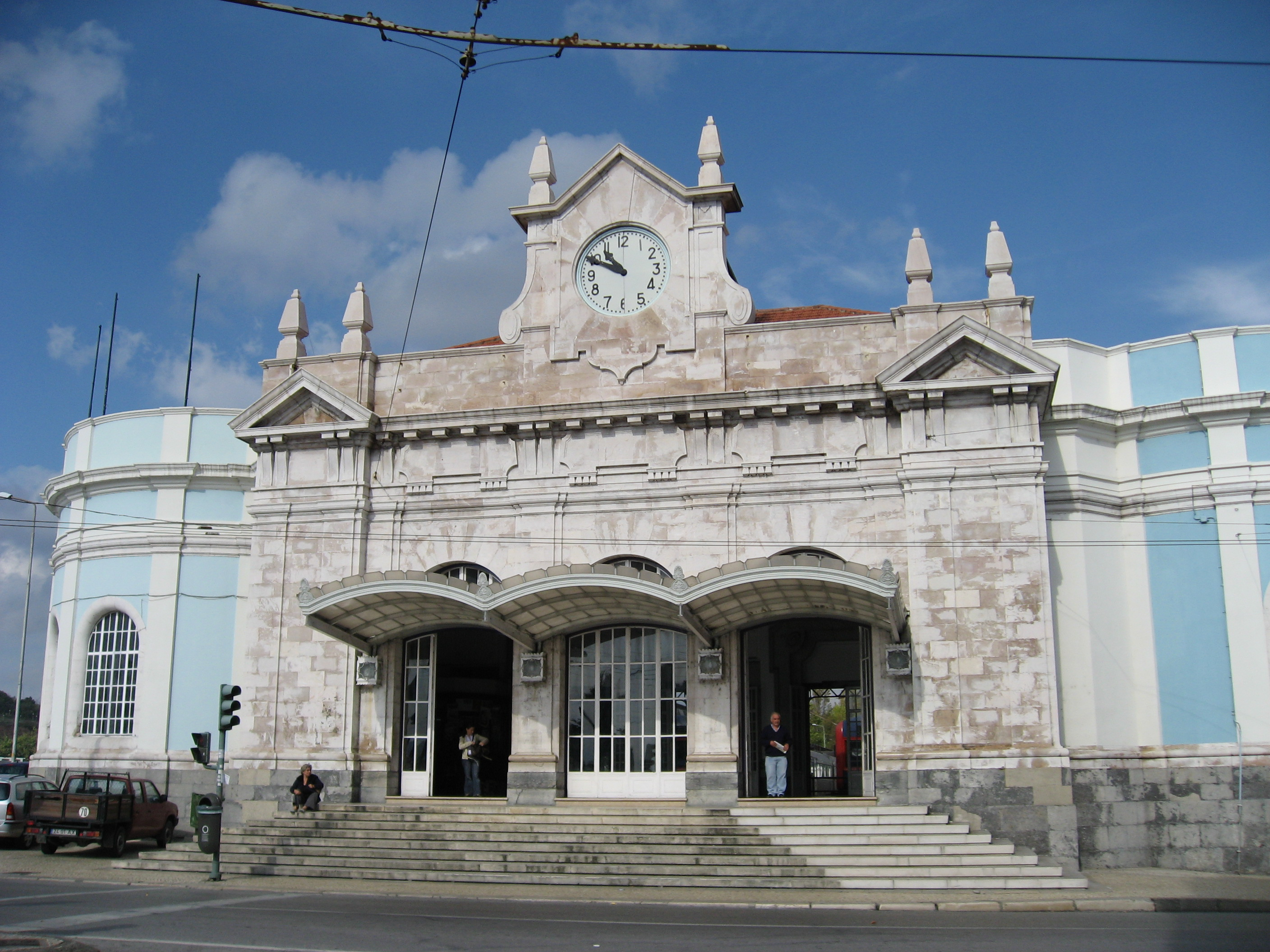
Coimbra-A railway station.

The two banks of Mondego River at Coimbra, are linked by three main bridges: the Ponte do Açude, the Ponte de Santa Clara (which is the oldest) and Ponte Rainha Santa, also known as Ponte Europa. The Ponte Pedonal de Pedro e Inês is the most recently constructed bridge and the only footbridge in the city.

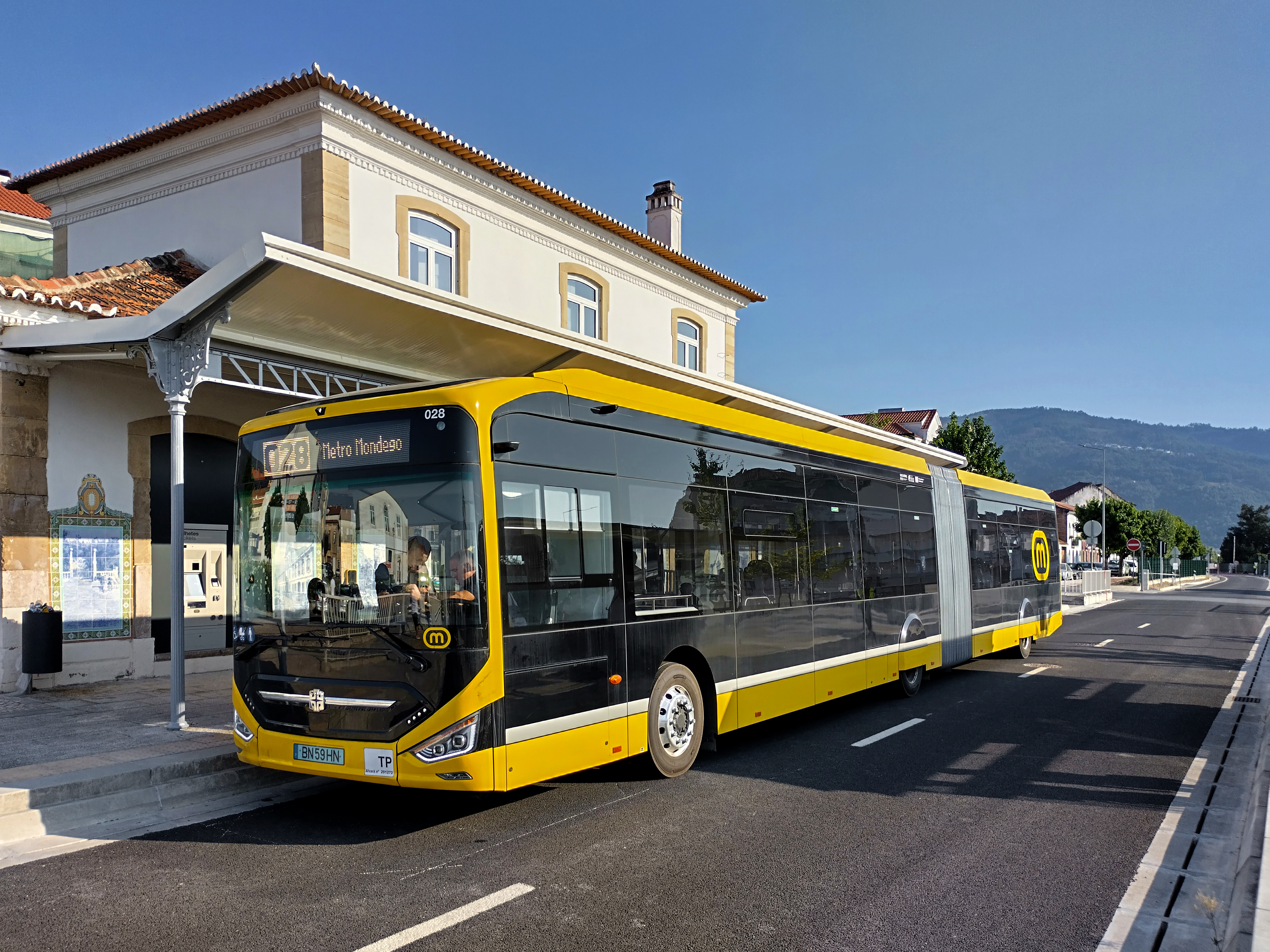
Metro Mondego bus rapid transit system.

The city is internally connected by an extensive bus network, the SMTUC (Serviços Municipalizados de Transportes Urbanos de Coimbra, Coimbra Municipality Urban Transport Services) and the Coimbra trolleybus system (the only such system in Portugal). In the past, the city also had a tram network (some are now parked inside a transportation museum). Taxicabs are also available, and are recognizable as cream or black and green (black car with green rooftop) taxis. The city is a hub for interregional bus services for all the country and abroad. A light-rail metro system, Metro Mondego, was proposed however the project was abandoned at the height of Portuguese financial crisis, and instead a bus rapid transit system was constructed, under the same name, which opened in August 2025.

Coimbra has several rail stations. The principal station Coimbra-B is on the main line between Porto and Lisbon. There used to be a direct overnight train to Madrid every night, however it closed in 2020 due to lack of passengers. There are plans to reopen the line by 2030 to improve transport between Spain and Portugal.

From this station, a small spur runs to Coimbra-A, the main station in the city centre. A small regional rail line (Linha da Lousã) also ran from Coimbra Parque at the south edge of the city centre. From Coimbra-Parque was possible to travel to Miranda do Corvo, Lousã and Serpins, among others. The line was closed for upgrading as part of the Metro Mondego project and was never reopened when the Metro Mondego project was abandoned, but there is local pressure for the line to be reopened. It is also possible to travel by train between Coimbra and Figueira da Foz (Ramal de Alfarelos), and Coimbra, Guarda and Vilar Formoso (Linha da Beira Alta).

Coimbra is served by the A1 motorway, which connects Lisbon to Porto.

A regional aerodrome is in Cernache (Aeródromo Municipal Bissaya Barreto) (CBP) [PCO], 7.5 kilometres (4.7 miles) southwest of the centre. With a 920 metres (3,018 feet) runway and flight information service until sunset, this regional airport has all the fundamental facilities for private flights.

The average amount of time people spend commuting with public transit in Coimbra, for example to and from work, on a weekday is 35 min. 2.4% of public transit riders, ride for more than 2 hours every day. The average amount of time people wait at a stop or station for public transit is 12 min, and 16.8% of riders wait for over 20 min on average every day. The average distance people usually ride in a single trip with public transit is 2 km, and 0% travel for over 12 km in a single direction.

Rainha Santa Isabel Bridge in Coimbra

== Education ==
The main square and buildings of the historic block of the University of Coimbra

Coimbra has been called A cidade dos estudantes (The city of the students) or Lusa-Atenas (Lusitan-Athens), mainly because it is the site of the oldest and one of the largest universities in Portugal – the University of Coimbra, a public university whose origins can be traced back to the 13th century. Nowadays, it has students from 70 different nationalities; almost 10% of its students are foreigners, making it Portugal's most international university.

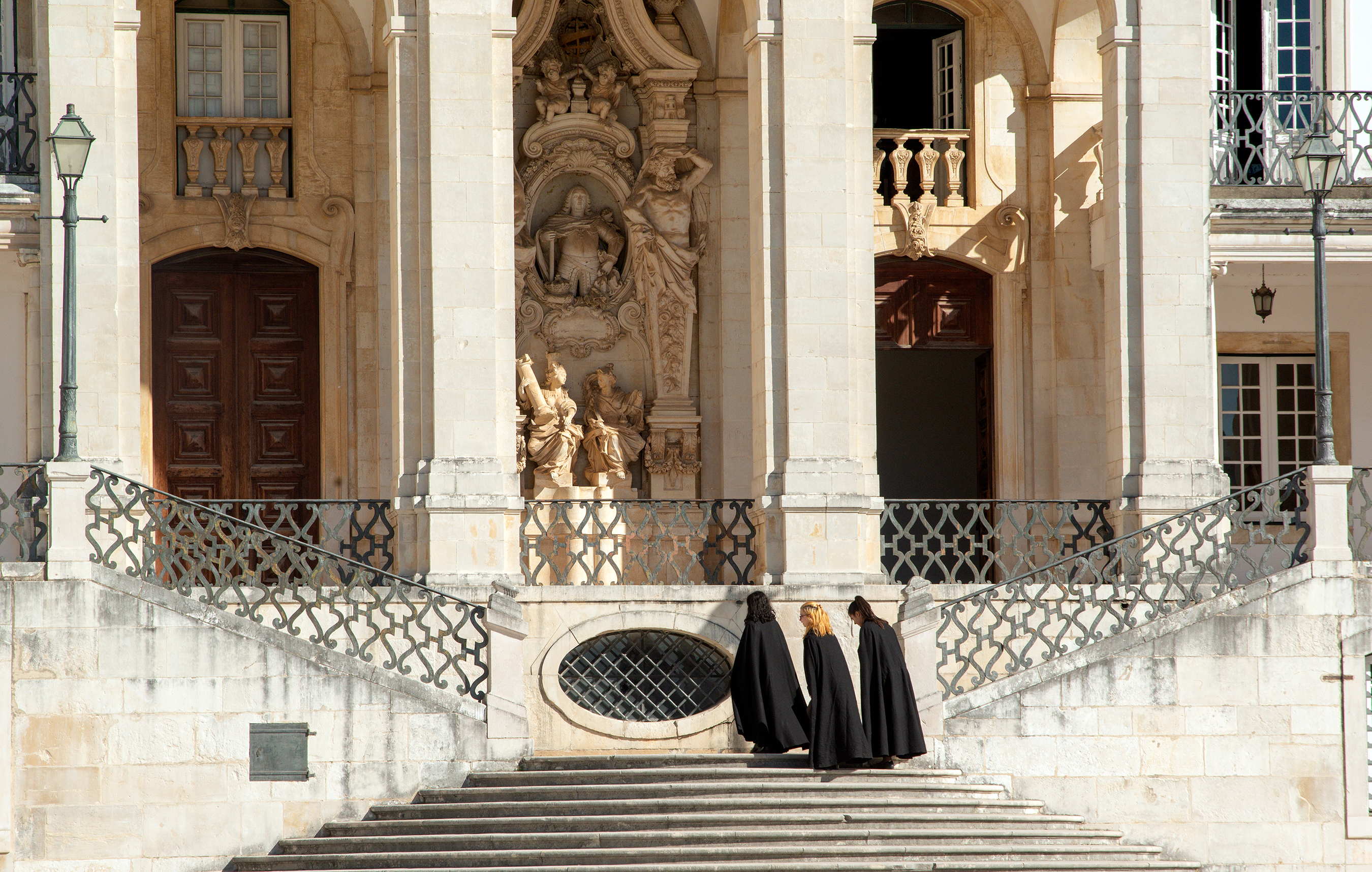
University students in robes during the first week of classes, Coimbra (2019)

Coimbra is also the place where the oldest and biggest university students' union of Portugal was founded – the Associação Académica de Coimbra (Academic Association of Coimbra), established in 1887.

As well, there are some other schools and institutes of higher education in the city: the Instituto Politécnico de Coimbra, a public polytechnic institute; the Escola Superior de Enfermagem de Coimbra, a public nursing school; and some private higher education institutions such as the Instituto Superior Miguel Torga; the Instituto Superior Bissaya Barreto; the Escola Universitária Vasco da Gama and finally, the Escola Universitária das Artes de Coimbra, an art school.

The city has also a large number of public and private basic and secondary schools, among these some of the best-ranked in the country, including Escola Secundária Infanta D. Maria (public), Escola Secundária José Falcão (public), "Escola EB2/3 Martim de Freitas" (public), Colégio Rainha Santa Isabel (private) and Colégio de São Teotónio (private), as well as several kindergartens and nurseries. There is also the Coimbra Hotel and Tourism School as well as a branch of the Tumo Center for Creative Technologies.

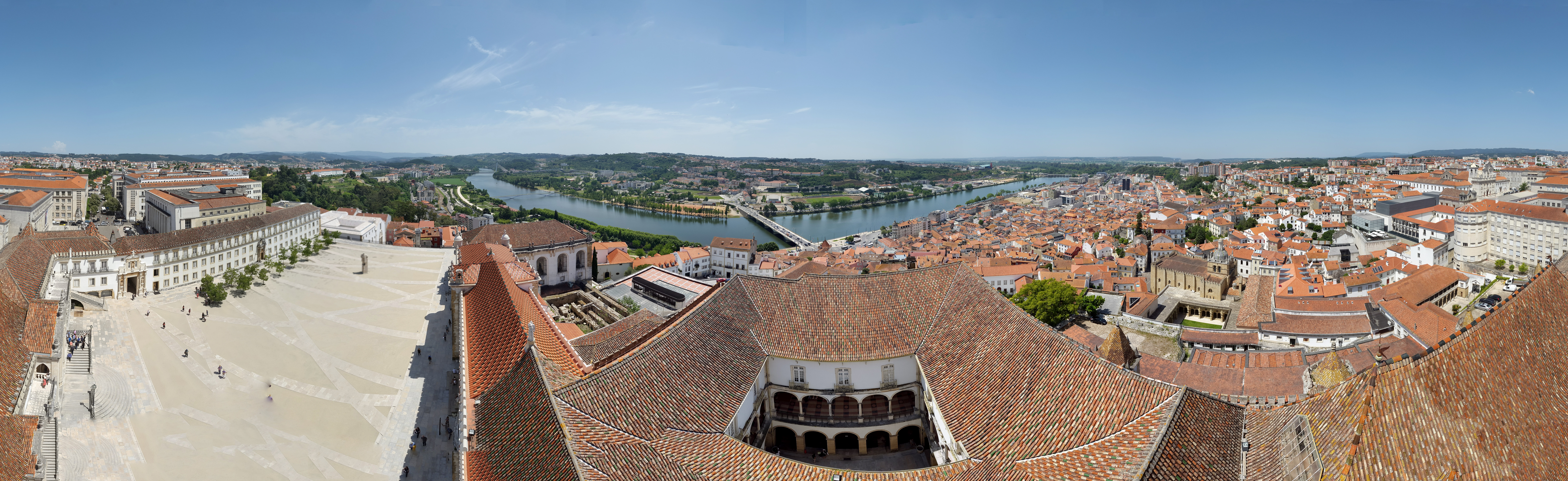
View of Coimbra from the University of Coimbra's tallest building

== Architecture ==
=== Civic ===
- Forest/Moorish City of Antanhol (Portuguese: Cidade Da Mata do Antanhol), Antanhol
- Palace of Sub-Ripas (Portuguese: Paço de Sub-Ripas), Almedina
- São Sebastião Aqueduct/Garden Arches (Portuguese: Aqueducto de São Sebastião), Sé Nova
- University of Coimbra (Portuguese: Paços da Universidade de Coimbra), Sé Nova
- City Government office (Portuguese: Loja de Cidadão), Baixa

=== Military ===
- Arch and Tower of the Almedina (Portuguese: Arco e Torre da Almedina), Almedina

=== Religious ===
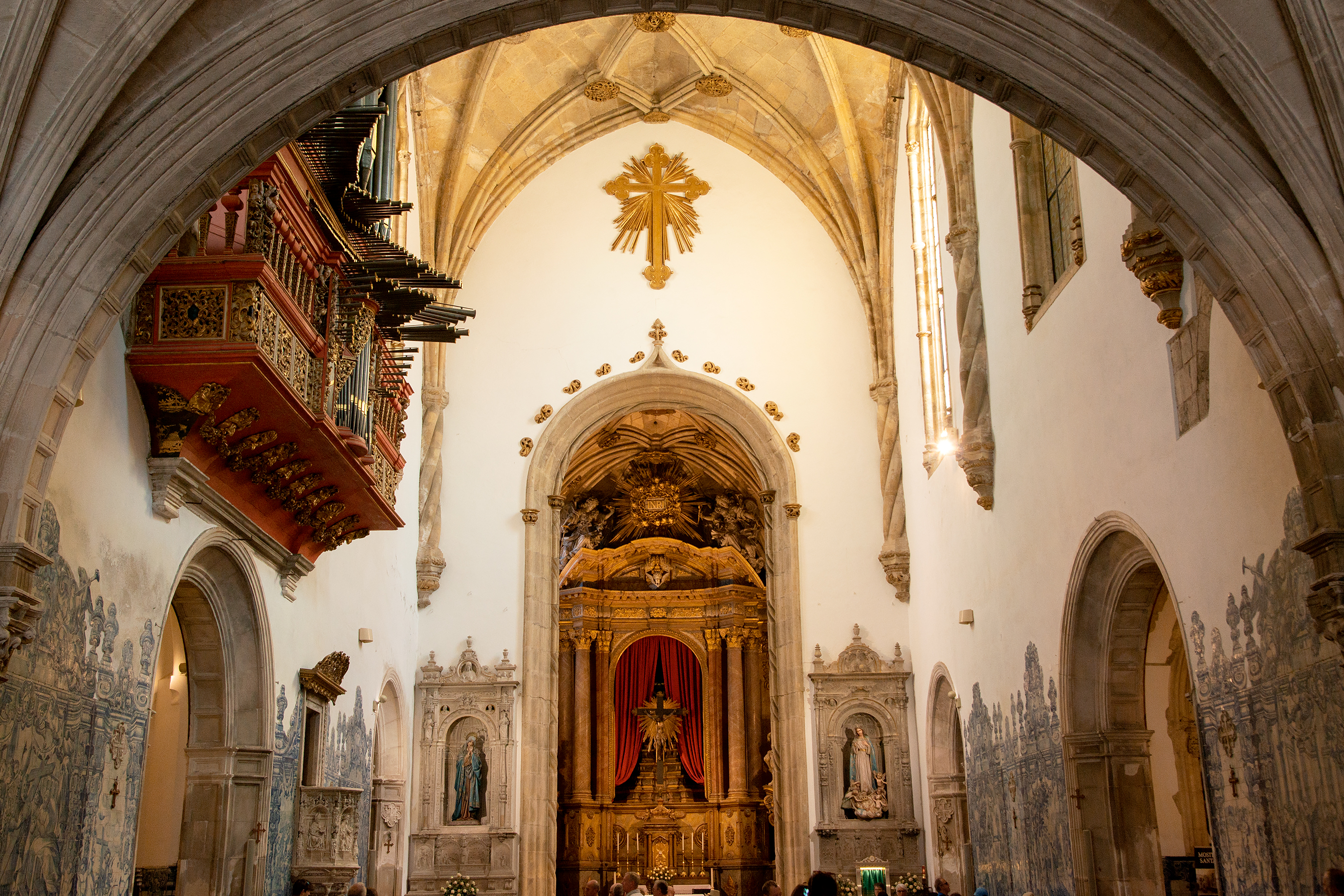
Church of the Monastery of Santa Cruz, Igreja do Mosteiro de Santa Cruz, Coimbra

- Cathedral (Nova) of Coimbra (Portuguese: Sé Nova de Coimbra), Sé Nova
- Cathedral (Velha) of Coimbra (Portuguese: Sé Velha de Coimbra), Almedina
- Chapel of the Treasurer (Portuguese: Capela do Tesoureiro), Sé Nova
- Church and Convent of São Marcos (Portuguese: Igreja e Convento de São Marcos), São Silvestres
- Church of Nossa Senhora da Graça (Portuguese: Igreja da Nossa Senhora da Graça), Santa Cruz
- Church of São Domingos (Portuguese: Igreja de São Domingos), Santa Cruz
- Church of São Salvador (Portuguese: Igreja de São Salvador), Sé Nova
- Church of São Tiago (Portuguese: Igreja de São Tiago), São Bartolomeu
- College of São Agostinho (Portuguese: Misericórdia de Coimbra/Colégio de São Agostinho), Sé Nova
- College of São Jerónimo (Portuguese: Colégio de São Jerónimo), Sé Nova
- College of São Tomas (Portuguese: Portas do Colégio de São Tomas), Sé Nova
- Cross of São Marcos (Portuguese: Cruzeiro de São Marcos), São Silvestres
- Episcopal Palace of Coimbra (Portuguese: Paço Episcopal de Coimbra), Sé Nova
- Manga Cloister (Portuguese: Claustro de Manga), Santa Cruz
- Monastery of Santa Clara-a-Nova (Portuguese: Mosteiro de Santa Clara-a-Nova), Santa Clara
- Monastery of Santa Clara-a-Velha (Portuguese: Mosteiro de Santa Clara-a-Velha), Santa Clara
- Monastery of Santa Cruz (Portuguese: Mosteiro de Santa Cruz), Santa Cruz
- Monastery of Santa Maria de Celas (Portuguese: Mosteiro de Santa Maria de Celas), Santo António de Olivais
- Monastery of São João das Donas (Portuguese: Mosteiro de São João das Donas), Santa Cruz
- (Former) Church of Carmo (Portuguese: Igreja do Carmo), Santa Cruz
- (Former) Portico of the Church of Santa Ana (Portuguese: Portais da Extinta Igreja de Santa Ana), Sé Nova
- Church of Saint Bartolomew, (Igreja São Bartolomeu)
Sé Velha cathedral

São Tiago church

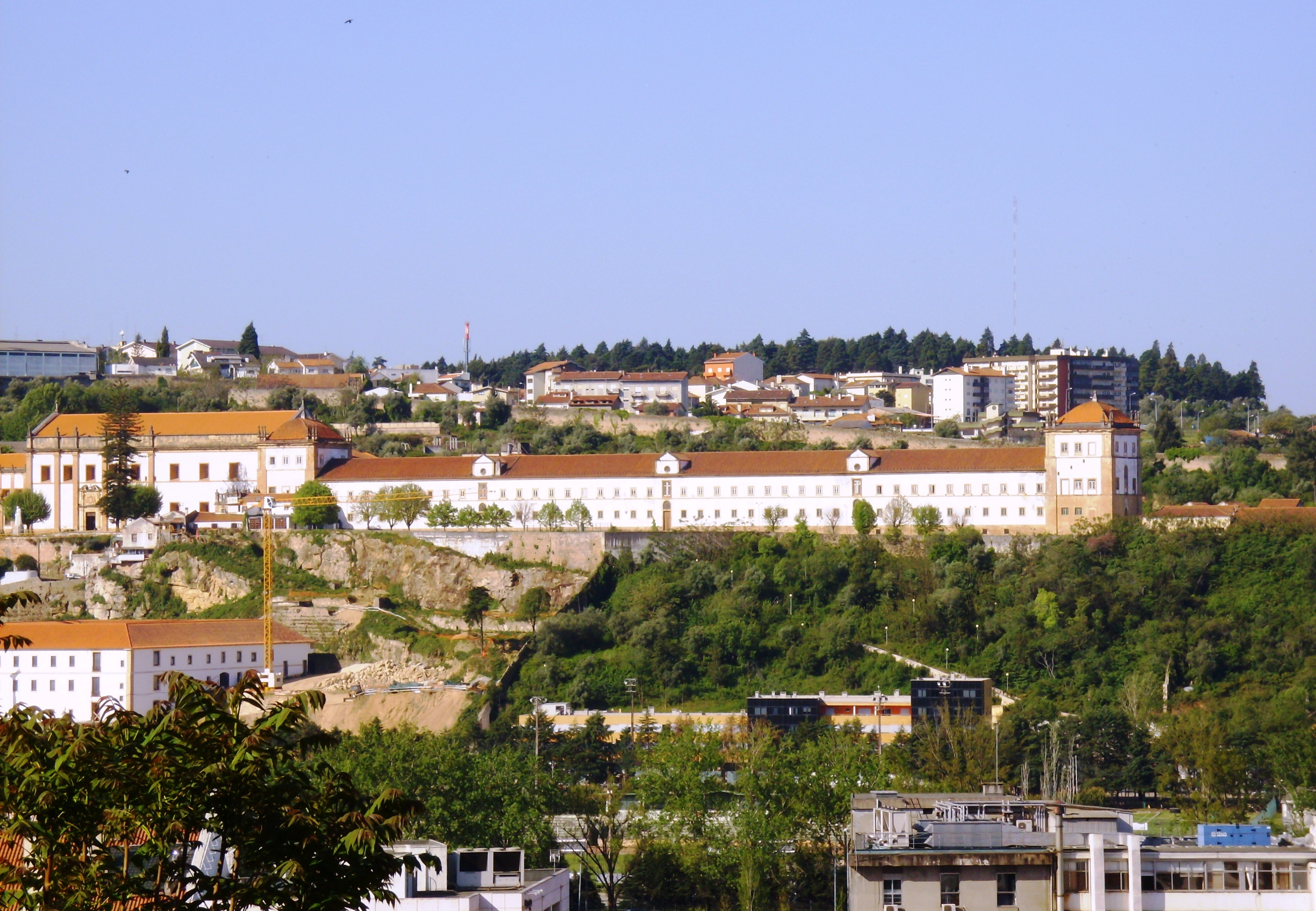
Santa Clara-a-Nova monastery

Santa Cruz monastery

== Culture ==
Coimbra celebrates its municipal holiday on 4 July, in honour of Queen Elizabeth of Portugal (spouse of the King Denis); a religious and civic celebration that celebrated the life of the former Queen, that includes a fireworks display following the night-time march of the penitents.

Coimbra houses the following cultural institutions:

- Machado de Castro National Museum, the second most important one in Portugal, housed in the former Episcopal Palace
- University of Coimbra General Library, Portugal's second biggest library, after the National Library in Lisbon
- The 18th-century Botanical Garden of the University of Coimbra

=== Coimbra fado ===
The Fado de Coimbra is a highly stylised genre of fado music originated in Coimbra. Among its most notable and historical adherents are guitarist Carlos Paredes and singer Zeca Afonso, while the Orfeon Académico de Coimbra (the oldest and most famous academic choir in Portugal) and the Associação Académica de Coimbra are important organizations that promote the culture and stylings of this subgenre of music. In addition, Coimbra has a contemporary music, boasting several live music venues, and some of the most popular clubs and music festivals in Portugal. Moreover, the Conservatório de Música de Coimbra, musical departments of the Associação Académica de Coimbra and the music programmes of the Faculty of Letters are noted by many of top music schools in the country.

The Orfeon Académico de Coimbra is an autonomous organization of the students' union Associação Académica de Coimbra, established in 1880 by a law student of the University of Coimbra (UC), and the fado section of UC's Associação Académica de Coimbra itself, are important organizations in Coimbra fado promotion and preservation.

According to tradition, to applaud fado in Lisbon one would clap his hands, while in Coimbra cough as if clearing the throat is the typical way.

=== Student festivals ===
Coimbra is also known for its university students' festivals. Two are held every year. The first one, Latada or Festa das Latas ("The Tin Can Parade") is a homecoming parade that occurs at the beginning of the academic year, and is a welcome to the new university students (Caloiros).

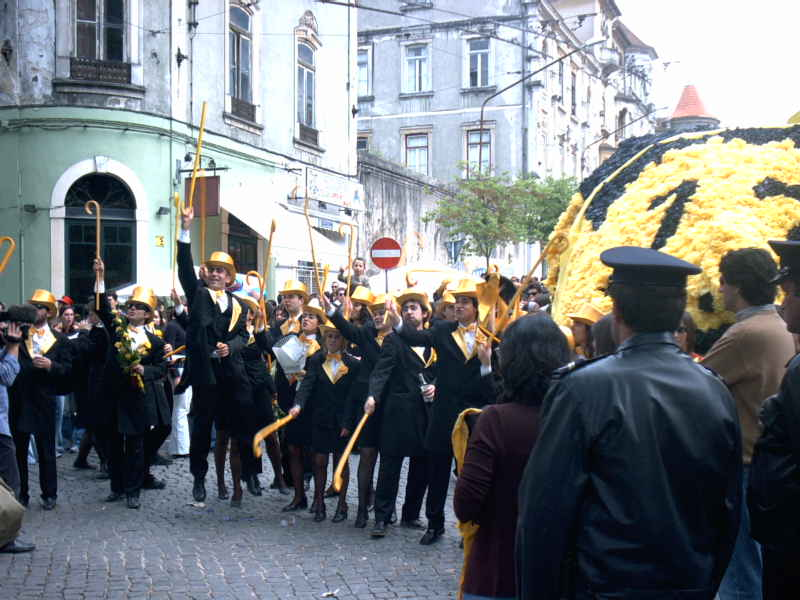
Undergraduate Medicine students participating in Coimbra's Queima das Fitas parade

The Festa das Latas goes back to the 19th century when the Coimbra students felt the need to express their joy at finishing the school year in as loud a way as possible, using everything at their disposal that would make noise, namely tin cans. The highlight of this festival, which now takes place at the beginning of the academic year (November) is the special parade known as the Latada. After marching through the streets of the city the new students are "baptised" in the Mondego River thus entering into the Coimbra academic fraternity. The students from the penultimate year, normally the 3rd year's students, are awarded their Grelos (a small ribbon). The Grelo is a small, woollen ribbon with the colour (s) of the student's faculty that is attached to a student's briefcase. Previous to this, at the morning the students must have visited the Dom Pedro V market where they must get a turnip to sustain the Caloiros during the day's festivities. Besides the tin cans they have tied to their legs, the new students wear all kinds of costumes made up according to the creativity and imagination of their godmothers or godfathers who are older students. They also carry placards with ironic criticisms alluding to certain teachers, the educational system, national events and leaders.

The second one, Queima das Fitas ("The Burning of the Ribbons"), takes place at the end of the second semester (usually in the beginning of May) and it is one of the biggest student parties in all Europe. It lasts for eight days, one for each University of Coimbra's Faculty: Letras (Humanities), Direito (Law), Medicina (Medicine), Ciências e Tecnologia (Sciences and Technology), Farmácia (Pharmacy), Economia (Economics), Psicologia e Ciências da Educação (Psychology and Education Sciences) and Ciências do Desporto e Educação Física (Sports Sciences and Physical Education).

Although being University of Coimbra's festivals, other higher education students of Coimbra such as the polytechnic's students or private institution's students, are invited every year by the University of Coimbra students who manage and organise this events, to participate in the Tin Can Parade and also in the Burning of the Ribbons. The academic festivities are opened to the entire city community and attract a large number of national and international tourists as well.

=== Music acts ===
Coimbra has a music scene that caters for most tastes with many festivals and events beyond the academic festivals, the traditional Coimbra fado genre and Artur Paredes, Adriano Correia de Oliveira and Zeca Afonso's musical heritage. It boasts several live music venues, and some of the most popular club nights and music festivals in Portugal. Moreover, the Conservatório de Música de Coimbra, the music-related departments of the Associação Académica de Coimbra and the music programmes of the Faculty of Humanities of the University of Coimbra are regularly cited among the top music schools in the country. Modern bands and artists with some degree of recognition in the Portuguese music scene include André Sardet, The Legendary Tigerman, JP Simões (from Belle Chase Hotel and Quinteto Tati) and Os Quatro e Meia. Lux Records, a Portuguese independent record label founded by Rui Ferreira in 1996, is based in Coimbra and has produced the works of many noteworthy music artists and bands of the city since then, including Belle Chase Hotel and The Legendary Tigerman.

=== Media ===
The Centro region is the third-largest regional media market in Portugal. The Portuguese public radio and television broadcaster Rádio e Televisão de Portugal has regional offices and studios in Coimbra. The Diário de Coimbra and the Diário As Beiras are the two major newspapers based in Coimbra. The students' union of the University of Coimbra has also notable media like the Rádio Universidade de Coimbra radio station and A Cabra newspaper.

== Leisure ==
Largo da Portagem, Coimbra

=== Parks and gardens ===
Coimbra has many green spaces such as parks, playgrounds, gardens and forests. The Botanical Garden of the University of Coimbra, the fifth oldest in the world, is located near the old university quarters of the Alta (uptown). The Portugal dos Pequenitos park is an educational theme park built during the Estado Novo. Its buildings are scale copies of Portuguese architectural landmarks and were completed in the 1950s.

The city's green areas also include the Mata Nacional do Choupal, the Mata Nacional de Vale de Canas, Jardim da Sereia (also known as Jardim de Santa Cruz), Penedo da Saudade, Parque Manuel Braga, Parque Verde do Mondego and Choupalinho. Quinta das Lágrimas, a 19th-century palace and estate, which was transformed into a hotel and golf resort, contains also a large park. Also noteworthy is the Paul de Arzila, a natural reserve occupying an area in Coimbra municipality (in Arzila), and in the neighbouring municipalities of Condeixa-a-Nova and Montemor-o-Velho.

Not far away from the urban centre, close to the city itself, and fully set in the municipality of Coimbra, there are plenty of mountain and river landscapes. These include the river beach of Palheiros do Zorro in the parish of Torres do Mondego and the Rebolim river beach even closer to the city downtown. The tallest reliably measured tree in Europe, Karri Knight, can be found in the municipality of Coimbra in Vale de Canas. It is a Eucalyptus diversicolor of 72.9 meters height and of 5.71 meters girth. It is surrounded by several other eucalypts of different species of over 60 m tall as well as one of the tallest Bunyas (Araucaria bidwillii) measured anywhere.

== Twin towns – sister cities ==
Coimbra is twinned with:

- Aix-en-Provence, France (1982/85)
- Beira, Mozambique (1997)
- Cambridge, United States (1983–84)
- Curitiba, Brazil (1977/95)
- Daman, India (2003–04)
- (Timor-Leste) Dili, East Timor (2002)
- Esch-sur-Alzette, Luxembourg (2004–05)
- Fez, Morocco (1988)
- Macau, China (2004)
- Padua, Italy (1998/2000)
- Poitiers, France (1979)
- Salamanca, Spain (1980–81)
- Santa Clara, United States (1971–72)
- Santiago de Compostela, Spain (1994)
- Santos, Brazil (1981)
- São Vicente, Cape Verde (1994–95)
- Zaragoza, Spain (2004–05)

== Sport ==
Coimbra is home to a large multisports club, the University of Coimbra's students' union Associação Académica de Coimbra (known simply as Académica), which is involved in a wide array of sports, such as rugby, volleyball, handball, rink hockey, basketball, association football, baseball, tennis, swimming, rowing, among many others. It also has a professional football club that currently plays in the Liga 3, the third-highest division of the Portuguese football league system, at the Estádio Cidade de Coimbra. Another sports club with tradition in the city is the Clube de Futebol União de Coimbra, which football team plays in the Campeonato de Portugal.

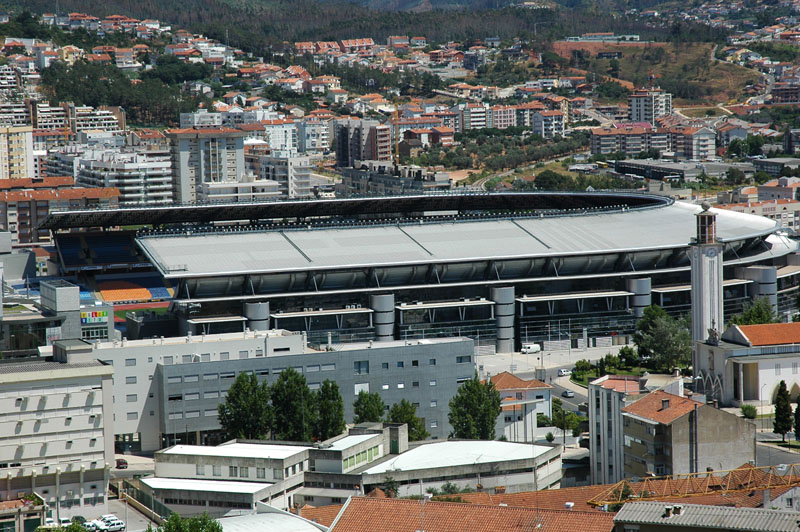
The 29,622-seater Estádio Cidade de Coimbra (Coimbra City Stadium).

The Estádio Cidade de Coimbra (29,622 seats), which was a site of 2004 European Football Championship and includes olympic swimming pools (Piscinas Municipais), as well as a multiuse sports facility (Pavilhão Multiusos de Coimbra), located both near the stadium; the Estádio Municipal Sérgio Conceição; and the Estádio Universitário de Coimbra, an extensive sports complex of the university on Mondego's left bank, are the main athletics and sports venues in Coimbra. The Pavilhão Jorge Anjinho sports arena (headquarters of Associação Académica de Coimbra), Pavilhão dos Olivais, and Pavilhão do C.F. União de Coimbra, are other places where some of the most important indoor sports clashes involving teams of Coimbra are played.

Other clubs in the municipality of Coimbra include Clube de Futebol Santa Clara and Olivais F.C.

Major sports teams based in Coimbra include:

| Team | Sport | League | Venue |
|---|---|---|---|
| Associação Académica de Coimbra | Football | Liga Portugal 2 | Estádio Cidade de Coimbra |
| Associação Académica de Coimbra - Secção de Basquetebol | Basketball | Portuguese Basketball League (LCB) | Pavilhão Multiusos de Coimbra |
| Associação Académica de Coimbra - Secção de Rugby | Rugby | Campeonato Nacional Honra/Super Bock | Estádio Universitário de Coimbra |
| Associação Académica de Coimbra - Secção de Voleibol | Volleyball | Portuguese Volleyball League A1 | Estádio Universitário de Coimbra |
| C.F. União de Coimbra | Football | Campeonato de Portugal | Estádio Municipal Sérgio Conceição |
| Agrária | Rugby | Campeonato Nacional de Rugby I Divisão | Campo da Escola Agrária |

== Notable individuals ==
The following people were born, died or otherwise lived within the municipality of Coimbra:

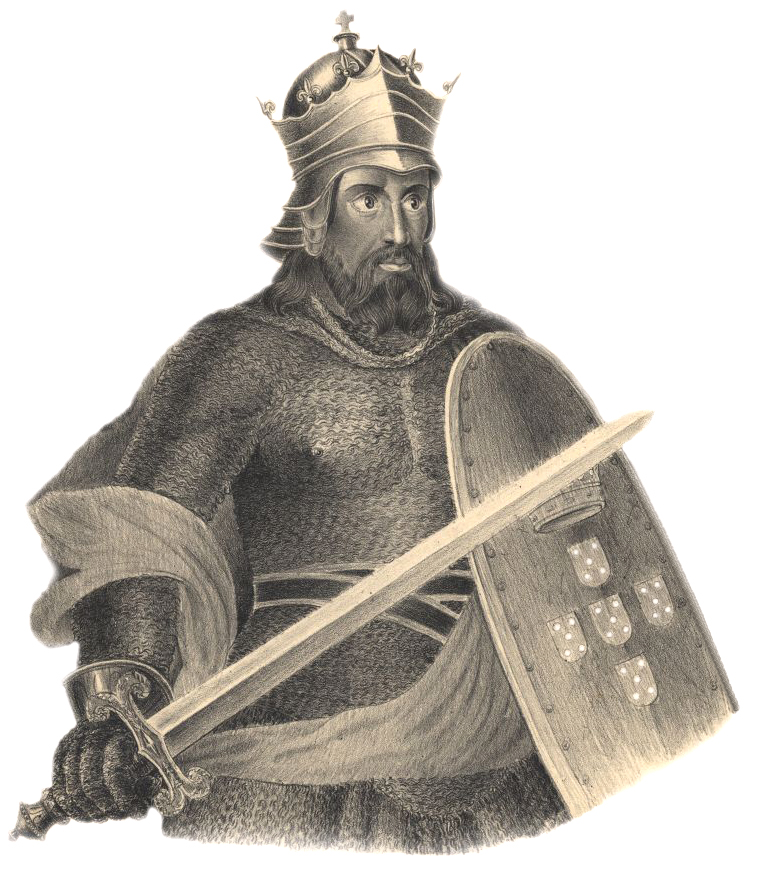
Portugal's first king, Afonso Henriques, is buried in the Santa Cruz Monastery

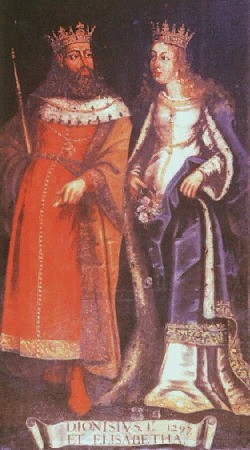
Painting from 1656 of Denis of Portugal and Elizabeth of Aragon

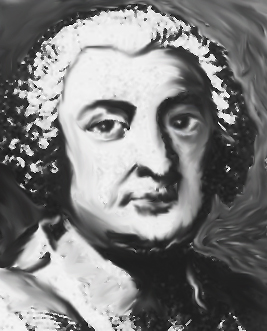
Carlos Seixas one of Portugal's musical sons: born and raised in Coimbra

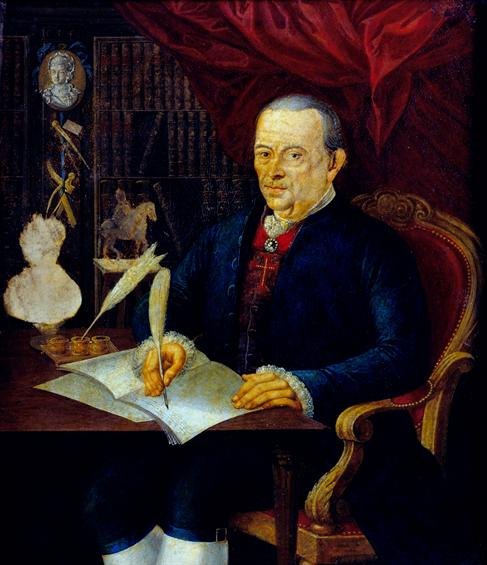
Joaquim Machado de Castro, sculptor

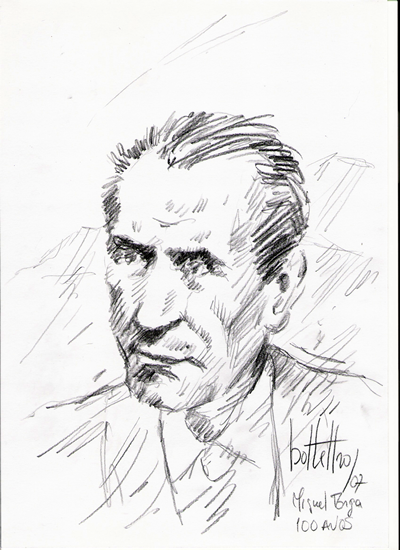
Miguel Torga, writer

=== Royalty & Nobility ===
- Cindazunda (5th century), daughter of Hermeric, king of the Suebi, and wife of Attaces, king of the Alans. This Suebi princess is immortalized in history as a symbol of the city of Coimbra, in Portugal, and her image appears in the official coat of arms of Coimbra.
- Afonso Henriques (ca.1109 – 1185 in Sé Nova), first Portuguese monarch, as Afonso I from 1139 to 1185, established his residence in the seat of County of Coimbra; he was buried in the Monastery of Santa Cruz in Coimbra.
- Sancho I (1154 in Sé Nova – 1212 in Sé Nova), second King of Portugal, 1185– 1211, known as the Populator
- Afonso II (1185 in Sé Nova – 1223 in Sé Nova), third Portuguese monarch, 1211-1223 known as the Fat.
- Sancho II (1209 in Sé Nova – 1248), King of Portugal from 1223 to 1248, known as the Pious.
- Afonso III (1210 in Sé Nova – 1279), first King of Portugal and the Algarve, from 1249.
- Luís de Alpoim (13th C) a Knight, ambassador to England, France and the Holy Roman Empire
- Saint Elizabeth of Portugal (1271–1336), wife of King Denis I; buried at the Monastery of Santa Clara-a-Velha.
- Pedro I (1320 in Sé Nova – 1367), King of Portugal, 1357-1367, known as the Just
- Ferdinand I (1345–1383), King of Portugal, 1367 to 1383, known as the Handsome
- Pedro Annes d'Alpoim (ca.1475-1500s), nobleman, conquistador, early settler of Azores.

=== Public Service ===
- Fernando Martins de Bulhões (1195–1231), Portuguese Catholic priest and friar of the Franciscan Order.
- Francisco Álvares (ca.1465 in Sé Nova – ca.1541), missionary, explorer and diplomat who travelled to Ethiopia.
- Pedro Nunes (ca.1502 – 1578 in Sé Nova), mathematician, cosmographer and academic
- Mem de Sá (ca.1500 in Sé Nova – 1572), third Governor-General of Brazil, from 1557-1572.
- Melchior Carneiro (1516–1583), Jesuit missionary bishop, one of the first Jesuit bishops.
- Diogo de Paiva de Andrade (1528–1575), celebrated Portuguese theologian.
- Saint José de Anchieta (1534–1597), Spanish Jesuit, humanist and writer, studied in Coimbra.
- Francisco Macedo (1596–1681), known as S. Augustino, a Portuguese Franciscan theologian.
- Joaquim António de Aguiar (1792–1884), politician, three times Prime Minister of Portugal.
- João Correia Ayres de Campos (1818–1885), archaeologist, palaeographer, antiquarian, medievalist and bibliophile.
- Ayres de Campos, 2nd Count of Ameal (1877–1952) a politician and career diplomat
- Sister Lúcia (1907–2005 in Sé Nova), one of the three visionary children of Our Lady of Fátima, lived at the Carmelite Convent of Saint Teresa
- Álvaro Cunhal (1913—2005), politician, pro-Soviet leader of the Portuguese Communist Party
- Isabel de Magalhães Colaço (1926–2004), academic lawyer, first woman to sit in the Constitutional Court
- Carlos Mota Pinto (1936–1985), professor and politician, 107th Prime Minister of Portugal, 1978/1979
- Boaventura de Sousa Santos (born 1940), sociologist and professor.
- Zita Seabra (born 1949 in Santa Cruz), Portuguese politician and publisher.
- Fausto de Sousa Correia (1951–2007), politician, deputy of the Parliament, and MEP
- Pedro Passos Coelho (born 1964), politician, and 118th Prime Minister of Portugal
- Ana Catarina Mendes (born 1973) politician, deputy in the Assembly of the Republic since 1995
- Pedro Fernandes Lopes (born 1986), Government minister in the Republic of Cape Verde.

=== The Arts ===
- Francisco de Sá de Miranda (1481–1558), Portuguese poet of the Renaissance.
- Carlos Seixas (1704–1742), composer, teacher and virtuoso of the organ and harpsichord
- Joaquim Machado de Castro (1731–1822), one of Portugal's foremost sculptors.
- Ayres de Campos, 1st Count of Ameal (1847–1920), art collector, humanist and politician
- Camilo Pessanha (1867–1926), Portuguese symbolist poet in Macau
- João Ameal (1902–1982), historian, journalist, politician and novelist, literary pseudonym of the 3rd Count of Ameal
- Mário Simões Dias (1903–1974), musicologist, professional violinist, music critic and poet
- Miguel Torga, (1907–1995), Portuguese writers of poetry, short stories, nominee for the Nobel Prize for Literature
- Carlos Paredes (1925–2004), virtuoso guitar player and composer, known as the "man of a thousand fingers"
- José Afonso (1929–1987), Portuguese singer-songwriter; known as Zeca
- Luiz Goes (1933–2012), Portuguese fado singer.
- José Álvaro Morais (1943–2004), Portuguese film director.
- Mário Vieira de Carvalho (born 1943), musicologist, author and academic
- Mário Crespo (born 1947), retired journalist and reporter
- Alberto Raposo Pidwell Tavares (1948–1997), known as Al Berto, a poet, painter and editor
- Carlos Paião (1957–1988), singer and songwriter, sang at the Eurovision Song Contest 1981
- Luís de Matos, (born 1970), Portuguese magician, studied in Coimbra.
- Paulo Furtado (born ca.1970), stage name The Legendary Tigerman, the lead vocalist of the band WrayGunn.
- JP Simões (born 1970), singer and musician.
- Carlos Damas (born 1973), Portuguese classical violinist
- André Sardet (born 1976), Portuguese singer and musician.
- Tiago Bettencourt (born 1979), singer-songwriter.
- Edgar Morais (born 1989), actor, writer and director.

=== Sport ===
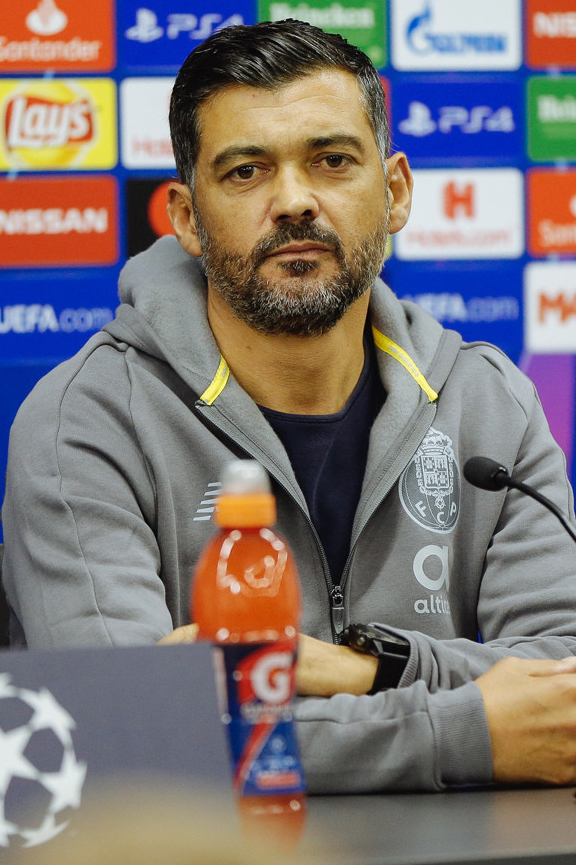
Sérgio Conceição, 2018

- Joaquim Melo (born 1949), former football goalkeeper with 368 club caps
- Carlos Simões (born 1951), former footballer with over 380 club caps
- Sérgio Conceição (born 1974), football manager and former footballer, who played for 10 teams and won 410 club caps and 56 caps for Portugal national football team
- Francisco Conceição (born 2002), footballer, who plays as a winger for Serie A club Juventus
- João Neto (born 1981), Portuguese judo champion
- Nuno Piloto (born 1982), footballer, captain of Associação Académica de Coimbra – O.A.F.
- Zé Castro (born 1983), footballer with over 370 club caps, played for Deportivo de La Coruña
- Filipe Albuquerque (born 1985), racing driver
- Miguel Veloso (born 1986), footballer with over 440 club caps and 56 for Portugal
- Bárbara Luz (born 1993), former professional tennis player
- Diogo Ribeiro (born 2004), Portuguese swimming world champion
- Miguel Neves (born 1988), footballer
- Noah Monteiro (born 2009), racing driver

=== Others ===
- Adelino Maltez (born 1951), lawyer, university professor, poet and writer

== See also ==
- Hospitais da Universidade de Coimbra
- Queima das Fitas
- Coimbra Group of universities

== Bibliography ==
- Deloitte, ed. (22 December 2006), Plano Estratégico de Coimbra: Diagnostic Preliminar (PDF) (in Portuguese), vol. 2, Lisbon, Portugal: Câmara Municipal de Coimbra, archived from the original (PDF) on 23 September 2015
- Câmara Municipal, ed. (2005), Relatório de Gestão: Organização Municipal (PDF) (in Portuguese), Coimbra, Portugal: Câmara Municipal de Coimbra, archived from the original (PDF) on 23 September 2015
