= Fucoli-Somepal =

Fucoli-Somepal (full name: Fucoli-Somepal, Fundição de Ferro, S.A.) is an iron foundry company headquartered in Coimbra, Portugal. The company has its industrial facilities in two locations: Coimbra (in Coselhas), and Mealhada (in the civil parish of Pampilhosa).

== History ==
The company had its origins in the 1940s, being today a result of a merging process of Fucoli and Somepal foundries in 1998. It started its international activities in 1990. Currently, it is among the largest iron casting producers and exporters of Portugal.
