= Choupal National Forest =

National Forest in Portugal

Coordinates: 40°13′19″N 8°26′46″W

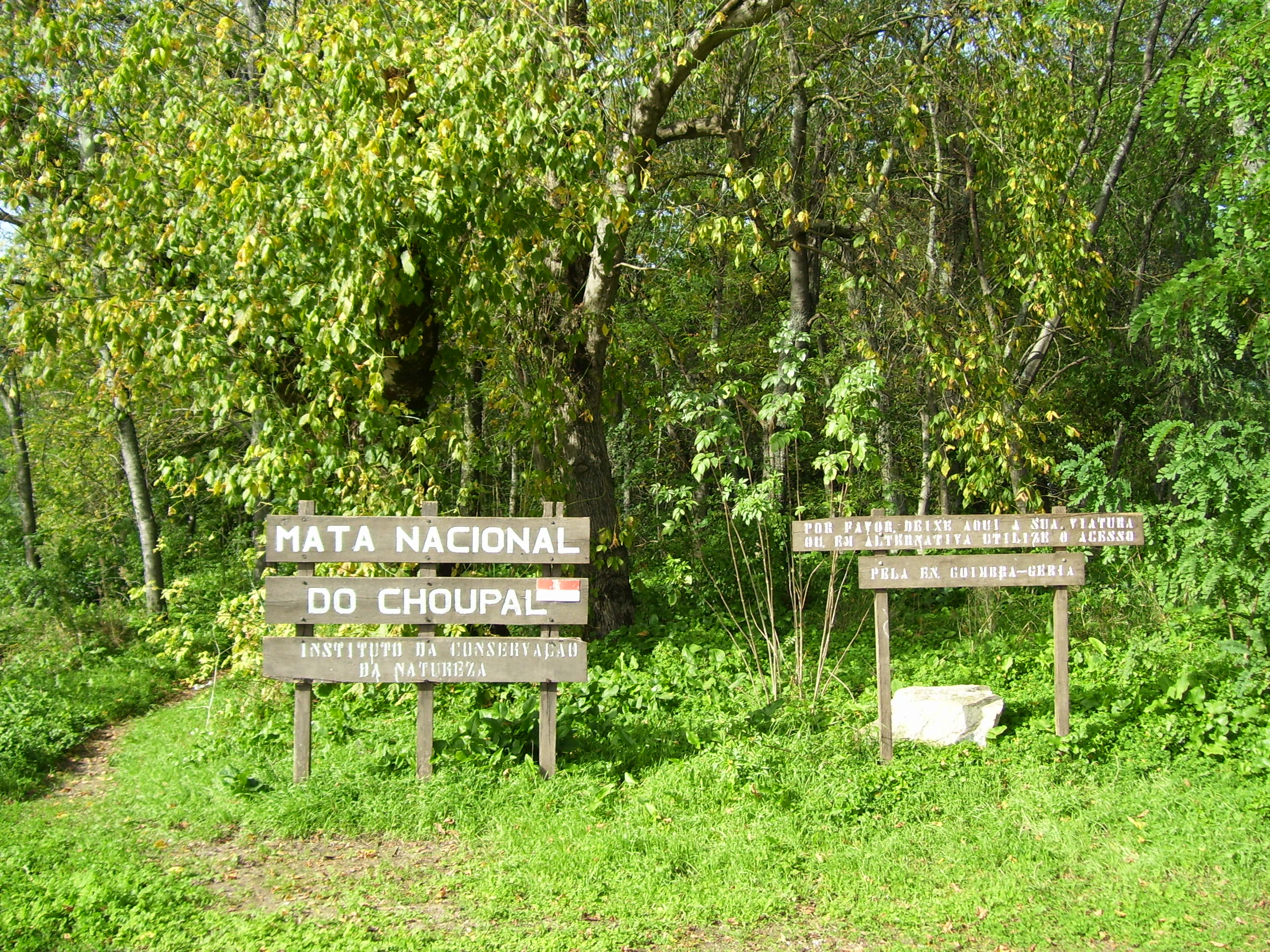
Choupal National Forest

Choupal National Forest (Portuguese: Mata Nacional do Choupal) is a national forest in Coimbra, Portugal. It is a short distance from the city downtown and runs alongside the Mondego River. The forest has trails for jogging, walking, cycling and horse-riding.

This grove of poplar trees (choupos, whence choupal "poplar grove"), was planted in an attempt to stop the floods of the Mondego river. In 1791, the engineer and Padre (Father, priest) Estêvão Cabral directed a big project that was meant to decrease the levels of silt in the river. The trees of Choupal were therefore planted to allow a better settling of the riverbed. Since the 19th century many other trees, including planes (sycamores; Platanus orientalis), beeches, laurels, and eucalyptus have grown in the area. Today the forest is a popular place for recreation, exercise and picnics.

== Location ==
Choupal is located within the northwestern section of Coimbra, bordering the right-side margins of the Mondego for about 2 kilometres. It is served by the EN111 National Highway, which connects Coimbra to Figueira da Foz; or by the Coimbra-B train station. Its territory, approximately 198 acres in extension, occupies portions of both the Santa Cruz and São Martinho do Bispo parishes.

== Zones ==
Taking into consideration its characteristics and sensitivity, Choupal can be divided in three different zones:

- The "Budding Zone", from its very beginning all the way through to Valeiro do Armazém; an area only moderately used by visitors due to the existence of a single walkway, called the "Living Forest" walkway.
- The "Center Zone", from Valeiro do Armazém to Valeiro do Meio; largely the most frequented area due to the various infrastructures located within it: The Institute for Nature Conservation and Forests headquarters, a picnic park, a café/snackbar, a sporting zone with tennis courts, and more.
- The "Western Zone", from Valeiro do Meio to the back of the woods; contains both regular and moderate usage spaces, having within it the Caimão Reproduction Centre, the "Aquatic Wildlife" walkway, aromatic/medicinal herb garden, butterfly vivarium and even a bridle path, which serves the Equestrian Centre located close by.
