= Miguel Neves =

Portuguese footballer

Personal information
- Full name: Miguel Neto Faria Neves
- Date of birth: 19 April 1988 (age 38)
- Place of birth: Coimbra, Portugal
- Height: 1.81 m (5 ft 11 in)
- Position: Midfielder

Team information
- Current team: União da Serra
- Number: 10

Youth career
- 2006–2007: Fátima

Senior career*
Years	Team	Apps	(Gls)
2007–2014	Fátima	93	(7)
2010–2011	→ União da Serra (loan)		
2014–2015	Atlético Ouriense	19	(2)
2015–2020	Fátima	60	(0)
2020–	União da Serra	62	(3)
- * Club domestic league appearances and goals as of 18:24, 16 June 2024 (UTC)

Miguel Neto Faria Neves (born 19 April 1988) is a Portuguese footballer who plays as a midfielder for União da Serra.

== Career ==
Neves made his professional debut in the Segunda Liga for Fátima on 17 February 2008 in a game against Feirense.
