= Probar =

Portuguese meat company

Probar – Indústria Alimentar, SA is a Portuguese company headquartered in Coimbra, which produces cold meat products. Its products include a wide range of processed meat, like sausages, smoked meats, sliced and wafer thin meats, fresh sausages and ready meals, and barbecue sausages, as well as dry, cooked, and chopped hams. It was formerly known as Probar – Companhia de Produtos Alimentares Barreiros, S.A. and changed its name to Probar – Indústria Alimentar, SA in March 2003. Probar was founded in 1967 in Coimbra, Portugal.

== See also ==
- Agriculture in Portugal
- Charcuterie
- Portuguese cuisine
