= Diário As Beiras =

- Type: Regional newspaper
- Format: Compact
- Founded: 1986
- Headquarters: Rua Abel Dias Urbano, nº 4 – 2.º andar - 3000-001 Coimbra
- Website: www.asbeiras.pt

Diário As Beiras is one of the three main newspapers of Coimbra, Portugal.
