= Instituto Nacional de Medicina Legal =

Portuguese forensic science services organization

The Instituto Nacional de Medicina Legal, I.P. (National Legal Medicine Institute) is a Portuguese government-owned organization under direct supervision of the Portuguese Ministry of the Justice, which provides forensic science services to the police forces and government agencies of Portugal. The national headquarters of the Instituto Nacional de Medicina Legal are in Coimbra. Its main general branches are located in Coimbra, Lisbon and Porto, and are linked with the legal medicine departments at the University of Coimbra, University of Lisbon and University of Porto.

The institute has laboratories throughout the country, and provides scene-of-crime and forensic investigation staff. Its principal functions are to provide forensic pathology and related scientific services, clinical forensic medicine services, teaching and research.
