= Arrabalde =

Place in Castile and León, Spain

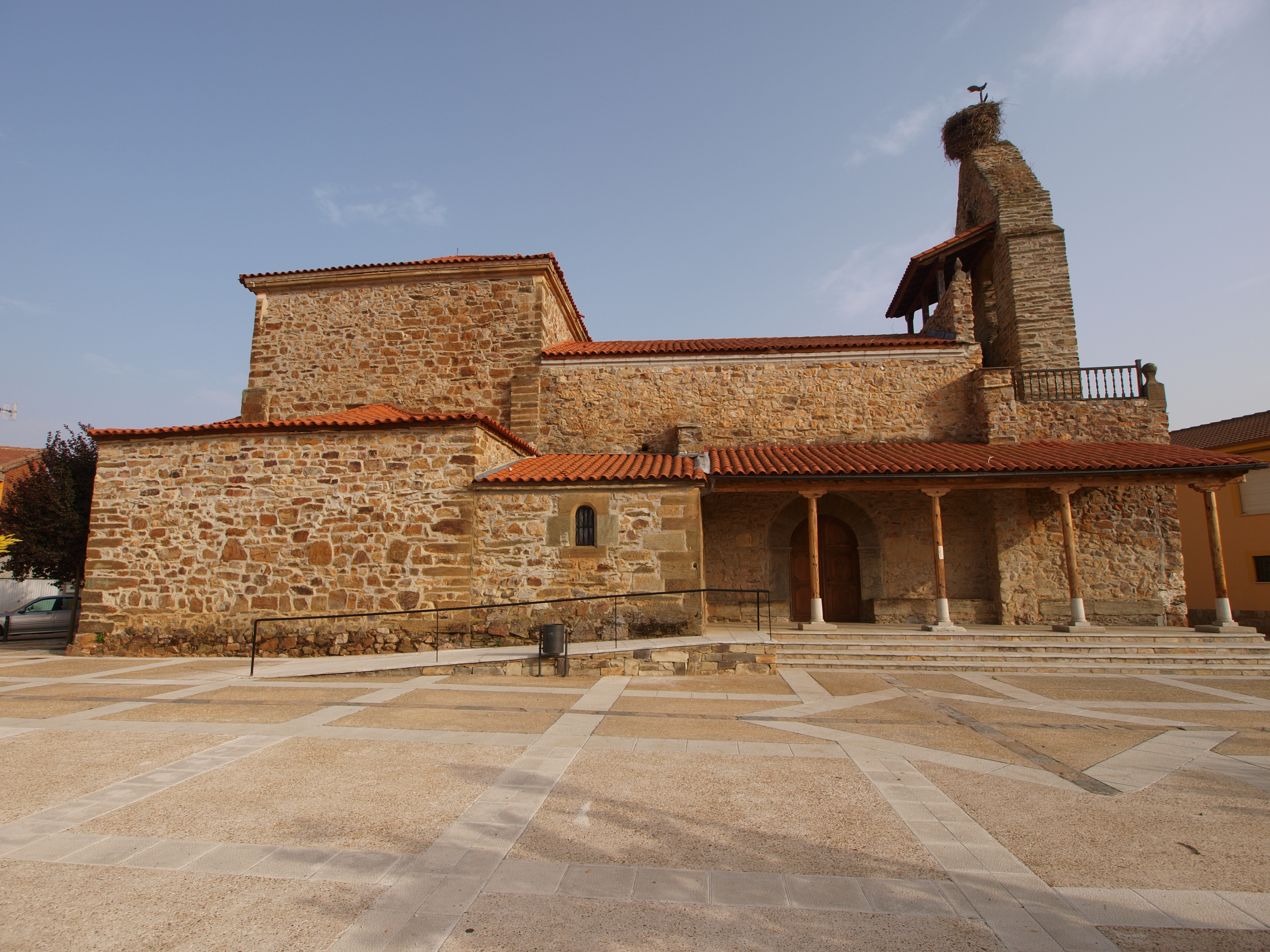
- Church of Arrabalde

- Location in Spain.
- Coordinates: 42°06′26″N 5°53′46″W
- Country: Spain
- Autonomous community: Castile and León
- Province: Zamora
- Comarca: Órbigo-Eria

Government
  - Mayor: Baltasar Fernández Fernández

Area
  - Total: 15 km^{2} (5.8 sq mi)

Population (2025-01-01)
  - Total: 186
  - Density: 12/km^{2} (32/sq mi)
- Time zone: UTC+1 (CET)
  - Summer (DST): UTC+2 (CEST)

Arrabalde is a municipality located in the province of Zamora, Castile and León, Spain.

== Place name ==
The name comes from the Arabic rabad "neighborhood, suburb", with the assimilated article al- : arrabád. In Spanish it was arrabal, while in Galician, Portuguese and Astur-Leonese it became arrabalde . As dispersed rural habitats are very common in the northwest of the Iberian Peninsula, the term arrabalde soon acquired the meaning of "neighborhood or village detached from the main nucleus". In this case, Arrabalde owes its name to its status as a satellite village of a larger nearby population, or, more likely, to the fact that the town was founded next to an old ruined nucleus.

== History ==
Its history dates back to ancient times, with the presence of a Neolithic dolmen, an Asturian settlement from the Iron Age, and during the Roman conquest, located in the Castro de las Labradas. In the vicinity of this town, Don Victorino Llordén, a lawyer from Benavente and antiquarian, found the Arrabalde Treasure, one of the most important pre-Roman treasures in Spain, which is now on display in the Provincial Museum of Zamora. In 2020, remains of a Roman-era military camp were found in the area.

== Population ==
Year	Residents
1981	528
1991	474
2001	383
2011	279
2021	218
2024	194
