= Alvorge =

- Civil parish
- Location in Portugal
- Coordinates: 39.979°N 8.455°W
- Country: Portugal
- Region: Centro
- Intermunic. comm.: Região de Leiria
- District: Leiria
- Municipality: Ansião

Area
  - Total: 39.05 km^{2} (15.08 sq mi)

Population (2011)
  - Total: 1,227
  - Density: 31.42/km^{2} (81.38/sq mi)
- Time zone: UTC+00:00 (WET)
  - Summer (DST): UTC+01:00 (WEST)

Alvorge is a civil parish of the municipality of Ansião, Portugal. The population in 2011 was 1,227, in an area of 39.05 km^{2} (15.08 sq mi). As a religious parish, it belongs to the Diocese of Coimbra.

The name "Alvorge" is from the Arabic Al Burj, meaning "the tower", In the period of the Christian Reconquest, Alvorge was part of the border area of Ladeia, so that its tower was part of the border defenses protecting the city of Coimbra to its north. The tower also had the purpose of protecting the spring of Alvorge, which provided a rich source of water in a region poor in springs. Only some ruins remain of this tower.

One of the first references to Alvorge comes in 1141 (even before the independence of the Kingdom of Portugal) in a deed or charter by which D. Afonso Henriques donated the church, tower and estate of Alvorge to the Monastery of Santa Cruz de Coimbra. The grange of Alvorge together with Alcalamouque and Ateanha (now part of the parish of Alvorge) are mentioned as three granges of Santa Cruz in an inquiry carried out between 1220 and 1258.

In the urban center of Alvorge is the Chapel of Mercy. This is a baroque building annexed to the old hospital of the village, in the facade of which one can see the royal coat of arms. Inside is a gilt High Altar from the 18th century. On the same street there are other historic buildings including the porch house that was donated to the Holy House of Mercy. The Church of Alvorge, from the late 17th century, is dedicated to Our Lady of Conception. It has an altar carved with Solomonic columns and figures of angels, vine leaves and grape bunches.
