= Nossa Senhora do Pópulo =

Caldas da Rainha — Nossa Senhora do Pópulo
- Civil parish
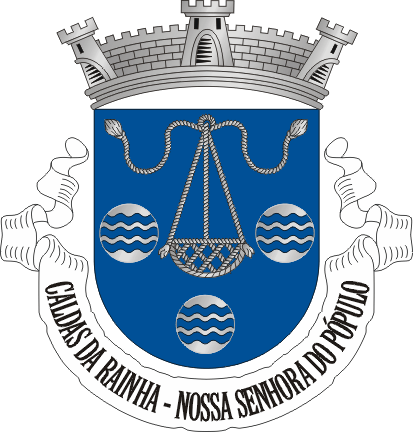
- Coat of arms

- Location in Portugal
- Coordinates: 39.395°N 9.119°W
- Country: Portugal
- Region: Oeste e Vale do Tejo
- Intermunic. comm.: Oeste
- District: Leiria
- Municipality: Caldas da Rainha
- Disbanded: 2013

Area
  - Total: 12.00 km^{2} (4.63 sq mi)

Population (2011)
  - Total: 16,114
  - Density: 1,300/km^{2} (3,500/sq mi)
- Time zone: UTC+00:00 (WET)
  - Summer (DST): UTC+01:00 (WEST)

Nossa Senhora do Pópulo (full name: Caldas da Rainha — Nossa Senhora do Pópulo) is a former civil parish in the municipality of Caldas da Rainha, Portugal. In 2013, the parish merged into the new parish Caldas da Rainha — Nossa Senhora do Pópulo, Coto e São Gregório. The civil parish has an area of 12.00 square kilometres (4.63 sq mi) and had a population of 16,114 at the 2011 census.

Along with Santo Onofre, Nossa Senhora do Pópulo was one of the two parishes which make up the city of Caldas da Rainha.
