= Tornada =

Tornada may refer to:

- Tornada (Occitan literary term)
- Tornada e Salir do Porto, a parish in Portugal
