= Alvorninha =

- Civil parish
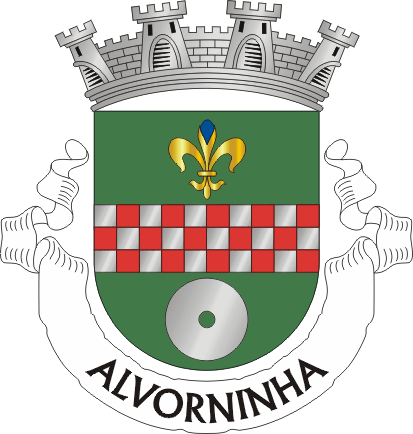
- Coat of arms

- Location in Portugal
- Coordinates: 39.383°N 9.036°W
- Country: Portugal
- Region: Oeste e Vale do Tejo
- Intermunic. comm.: Oeste
- District: Leiria
- Municipality: Caldas da Rainha

Area
  - Total: 37.60 km^{2} (14.52 sq mi)

Population (2011)
  - Total: 2,987
  - Density: 79/km^{2} (210/sq mi)
- Time zone: UTC+00:00 (WET)
  - Summer (DST): UTC+01:00 (WEST)

Alvorninha is one of twelve civil parishes (freguesias) in the municipality of Caldas da Rainha, Portugal. The civil parish has an area of 37.60 square kilometres (14.52 sq mi) and had a population of 2,987 at the 2011 census.

It is the birth location of Cardinal José da Cruz Policarpo.
