= Salir do Porto =

Former civil parish in the municipality of Caldas da Rainha, Portugal

- Civil parish
- Location in Portugal
- Coordinates: 39.493°N 9.156°W
- Country: Portugal
- Region: Oeste e Vale do Tejo
- Intermunic. comm.: Oeste
- District: Leiria
- Municipality: Caldas da Rainha
- Disbanded: 2013

Area
  - Total: 9.86 km^{2} (3.81 sq mi)

Population (2011)
  - Total: 797
  - Density: 81/km^{2} (210/sq mi)
- Time zone: UTC+00:00 (WET)
  - Summer (DST): UTC+01:00 (WEST)
- Website: www.jfreg-salirdoporto.online.pt

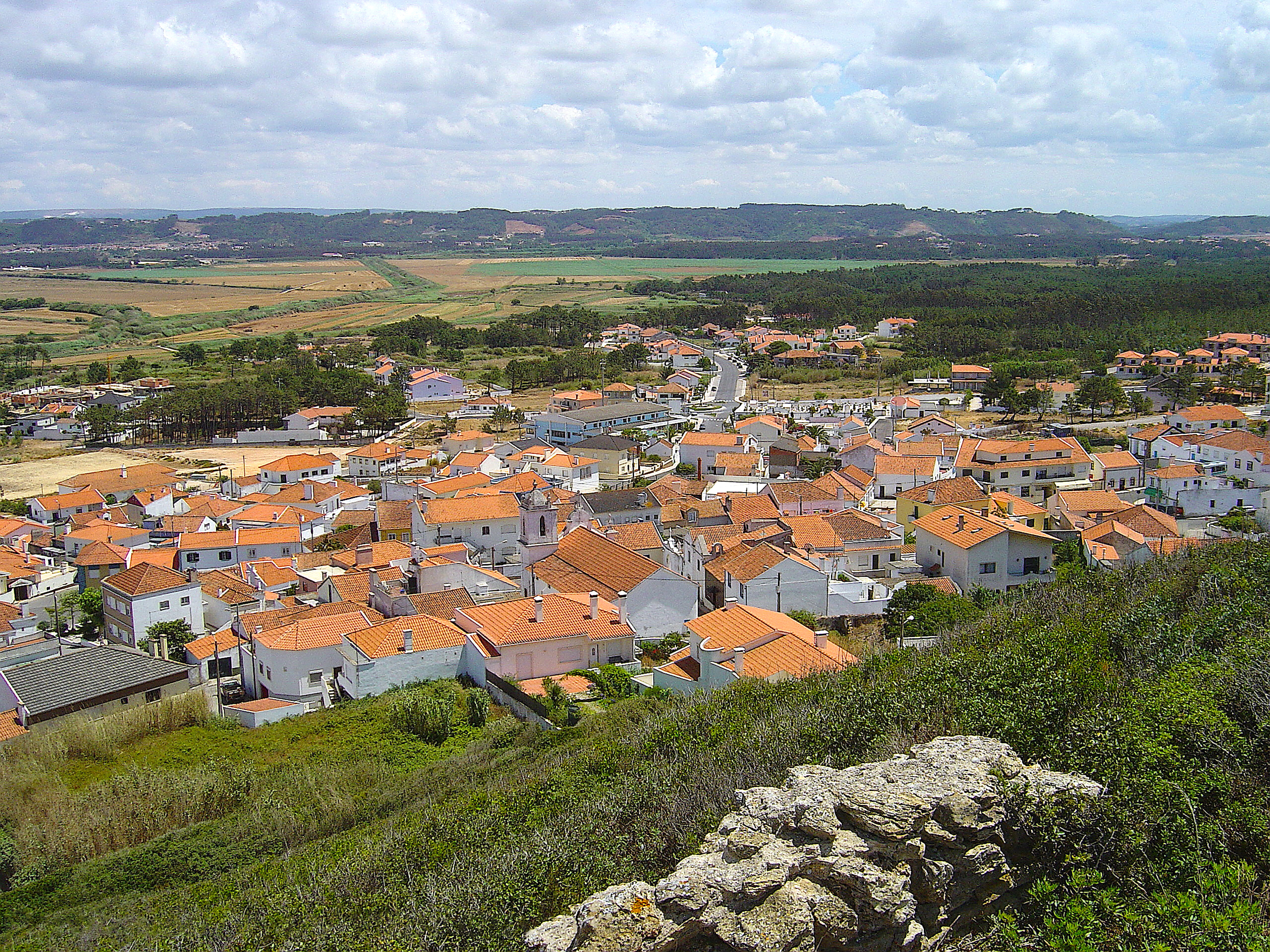
Picture of Salir do Porto - 2006

Salir do Porto is a former civil parish in the municipality of Caldas da Rainha, Portugal. In 2013, the parish merged into the new parish Tornada e Salir do Porto. The civil parish has an area of 9.86 square kilometres (3.81 sq mi) and had a population of 797 at the 2011 census.

Salir do Porto was the northernmost parish of the municipality of Caldas da Rainha. It has a beach with a famous sand dune almost 49 metres high. The beach is located by the river Tornada that flows into the São Martinho bay. There are other beaches on the ocean side. Those are rock beaches that the locals call quebradas.

Salir has three different communities: Salir do Porto, Casais de Salir do Porto and Bouro.

Salir is served by the Oeste railroad.
