= Santa Catarina (Caldas da Rainha) =

- Civil parish
- Location in Portugal
- Coordinates: 39.447°N 9.015°W
- Country: Portugal
- Region: Oeste e Vale do Tejo
- Intermunic. comm.: Oeste
- District: Leiria
- Municipality: Caldas da Rainha

Area
  - Total: 19.98 km^{2} (7.71 sq mi)

Population (2011)
  - Total: 3,029
  - Density: 150/km^{2} (390/sq mi)
- Time zone: UTC+00:00 (WET)
  - Summer (DST): UTC+01:00 (WEST)

Santa Catarina is one of twelve civil parishes (freguesias) in the municipality of Caldas da Rainha, Portugal. The civil parish has an area of 19.98 square kilometres (7.71 sq mi) and had a population of 3,029 at the 2011 census.

Its main economic activities are leather goods industry, construction, agriculture, horticulture, livestock production, trade, but it is its cutlery industry that makes Santa Catarina known internationally.

== Villages ==
- Peso
- Vigia
- Cumeira
- Mouraria
- Casal do Rio
- Casal do Bicho
- Quinta da Ferraria
- Casal das Freiras
- Casal dos Nortes
- Casal da Coita
- Portela
- Abrunheira
- Casal da Marinha
- Casal da Azenha
- Casal das Penas
- Mata de Porto Mouro
- Relvas
- Granja Nova
- Casal da Cruz
- Casal Torcano

== Cultural Heritage ==
- Parish church
- Mansion-house
- Pillory
- Ancient hillfort
- Public garden
- Mestras forest
- Chapels
