= Caldas da Rainha =

- Municipality
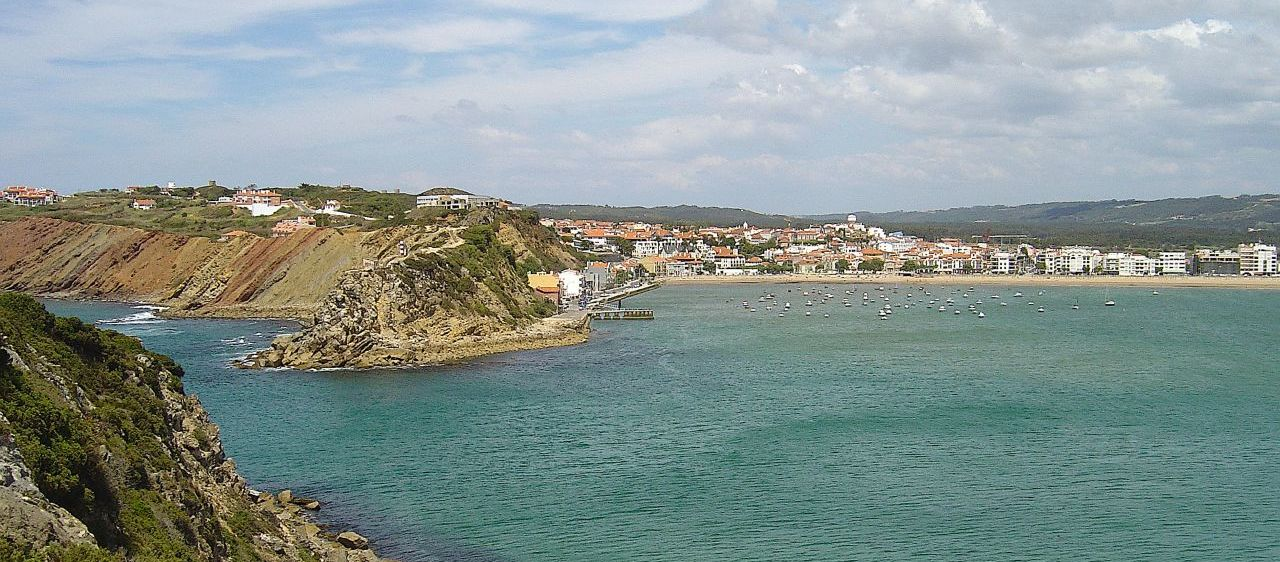
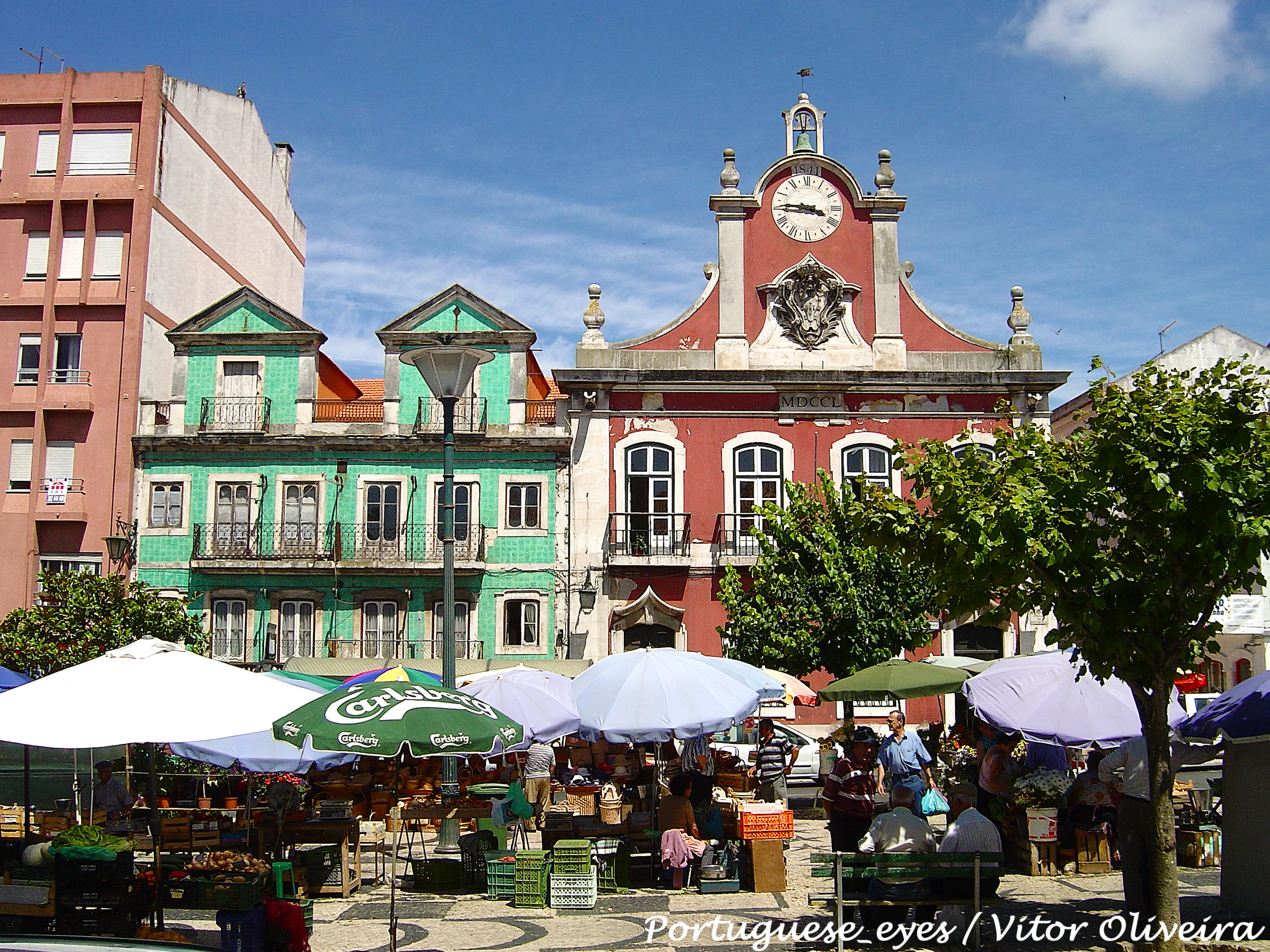
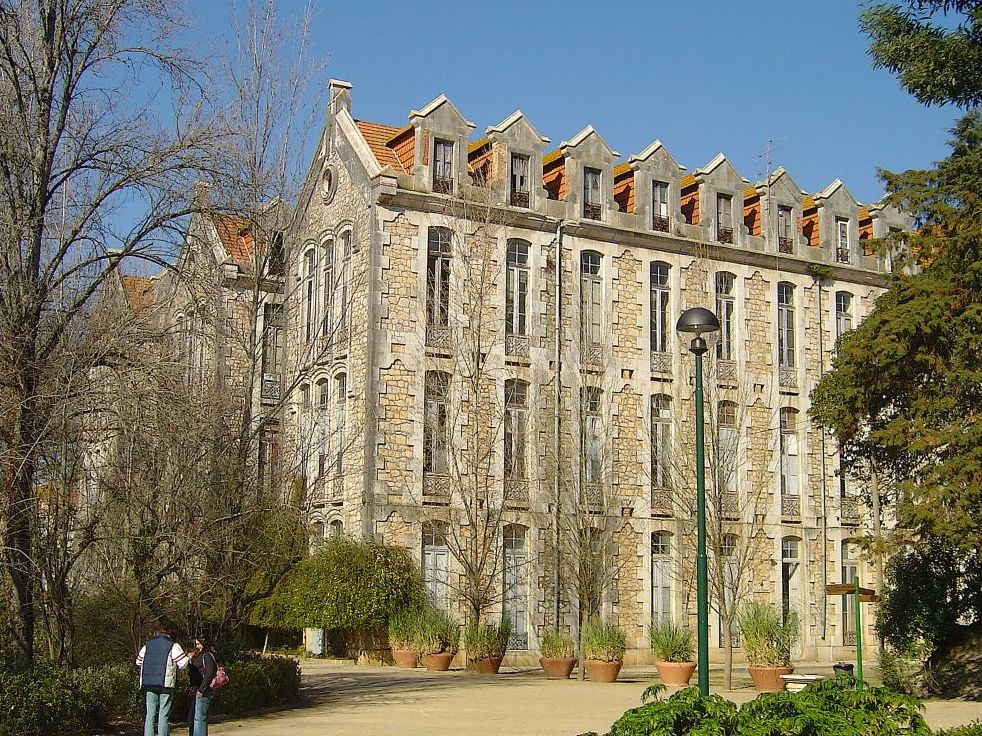
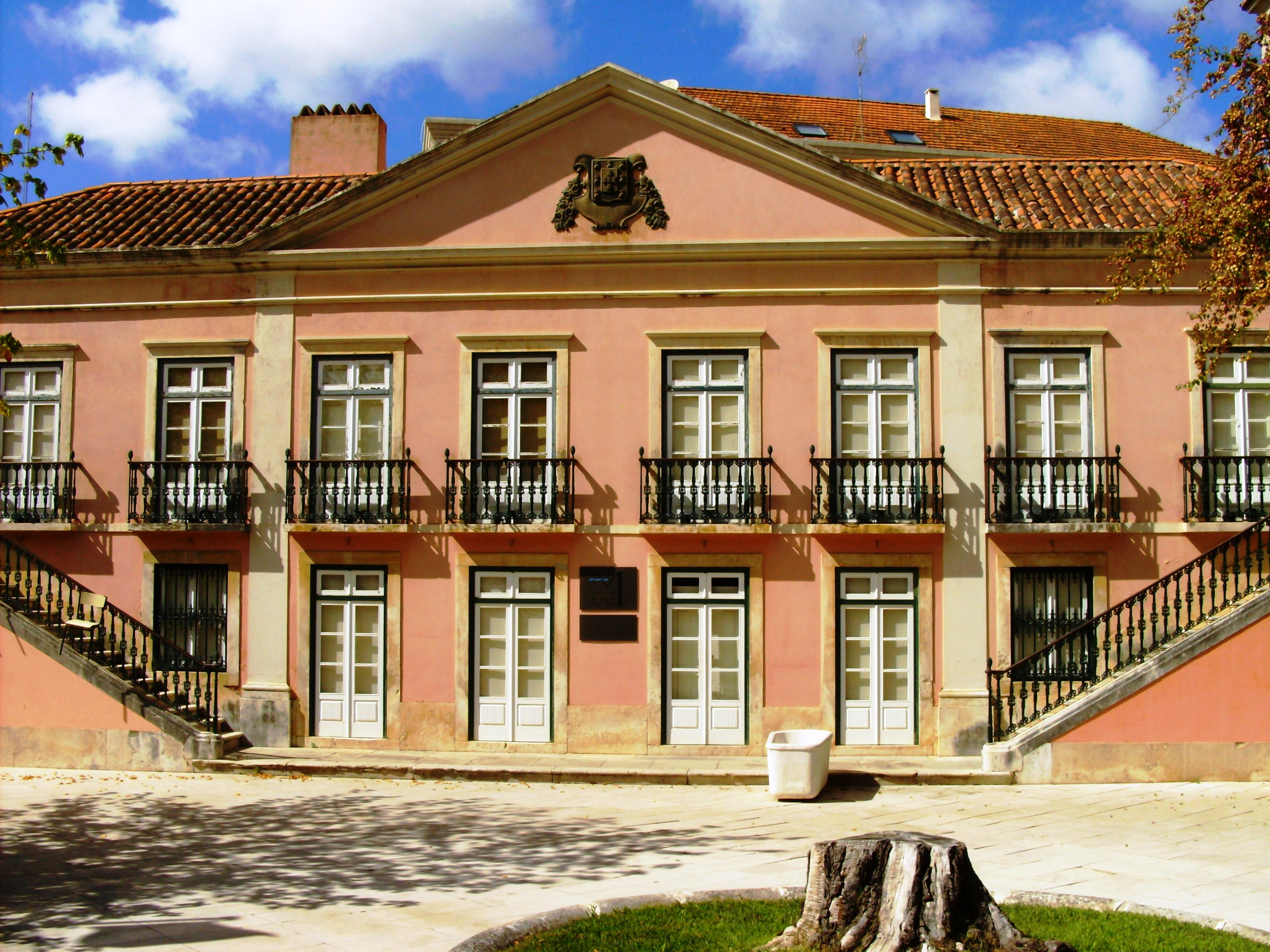
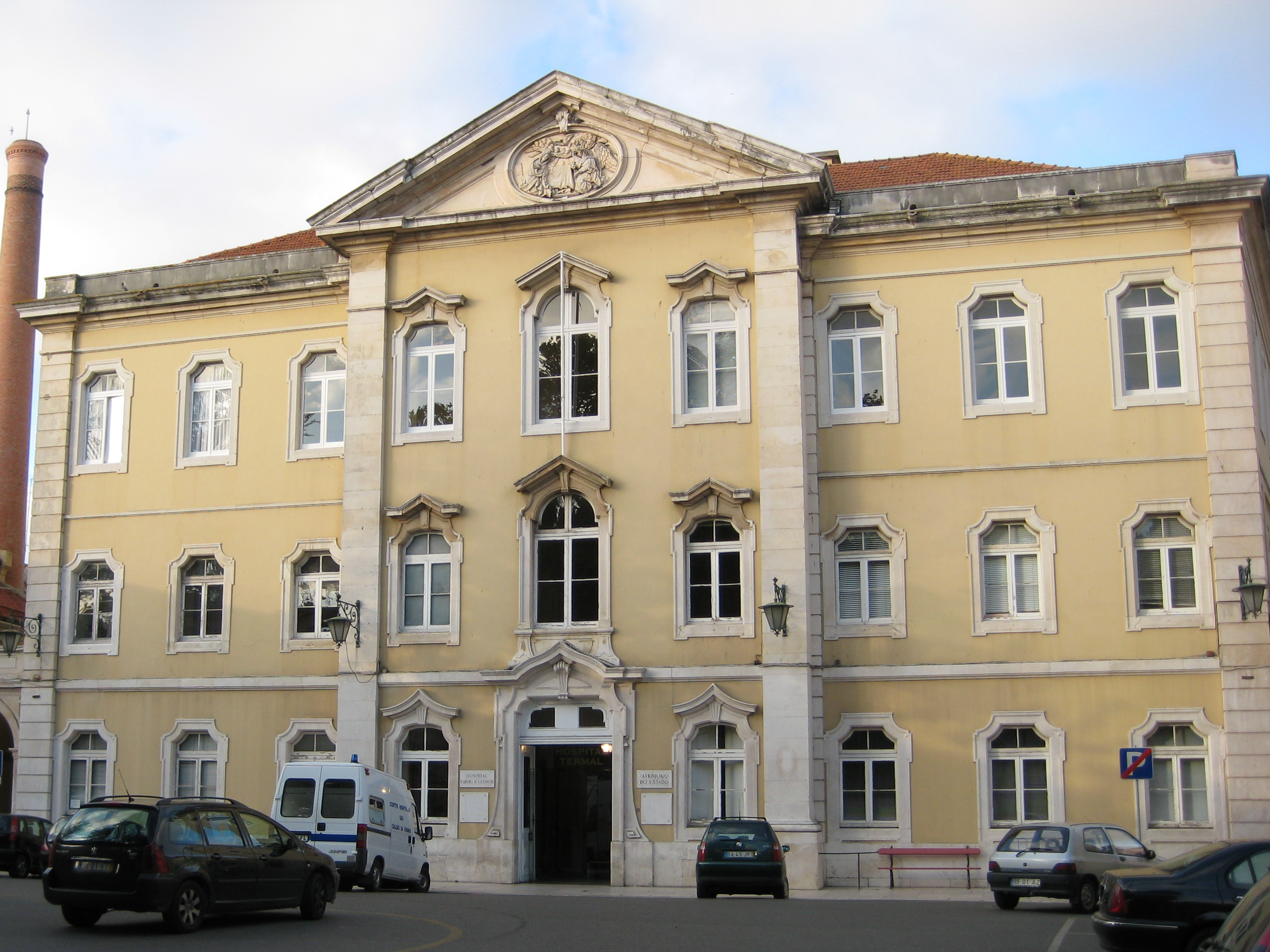

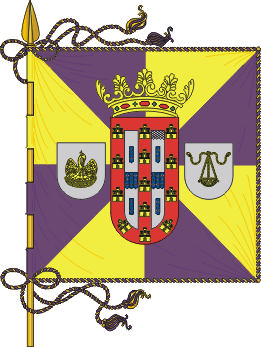
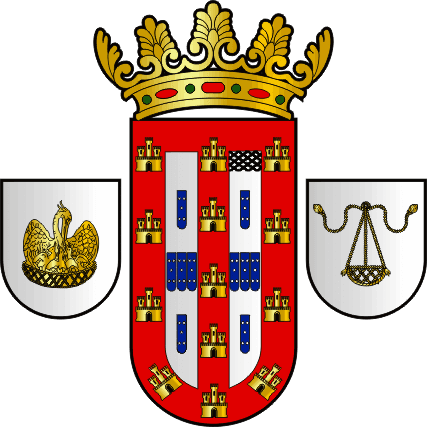
- Flag Coat of arms
- Nickname: Caldas
- Interactive map of Caldas da Rainha
- Coordinates: 39°24′26″N 9°8′9″W
- Country: Portugal
- Intermunicipal entity: Comunidade Intermunicipal do Oeste
- NUTS I statistical division: Continente
- NUTS II statistical region: Oeste e Vale do Tejo
- NUTS III statistical subregion: Oeste
- District: Leiria
- Historical province: Estremadura
- Founded: 1484
- Vila (town) status: 1511
- Concelho/Município (Municipality): 1821
- Cidade (city) status: 1927
- Founder: Queen Leonor
- Named for: Queen Leonor
- Freguesias (civil parishes): 12: • A dos Francos; • Alvorninha; • União das Freguesias de Caldas da Rainha — Nossa Senhora do Pópulo, Coto e São Gregório; • União das Freguesias de Caldas da Rainha — Santo Onofre e Serra do Bouro; • Carvalhal Benfeito; • Foz do Arelho; • Landal; • Nadadouro; • Salir de Matos; • Santa Catarina; • União das Freguesias de Tornada e Salir do Porto; • Vidais

Government
  - Type: Municipality (Município, or concelho)
  - Body: Câmara Municipal (executive); Assembleia Municipal (deliberative)
  - Mayor: Vitor Manuel Calisto Marques (Vamos Mudar - MV)
  - President of the Municipal Assembly: António Gonçalves Marques Curado (Vamos Mudar)

Area
  - Municipality: 255.69 km^{2} (98.72 sq mi)

Dimensions
  - Length: 24 km (15 mi)
  - Width: 22 km (14 mi)
- Highest elevation: 255 m (837 ft)
- Lowest elevation: 0 m (0 ft)

Population (2011)
  - Municipality: 51,729
  - Density: 202.3/km^{2} (524/sq mi)
  - Statistical city: 30,343
- (Note: The "statistical city" of Caldas da Rainha contains the entirety of the civil parish of Santo Onofre, most of the civil parish of Nossa Senhora do Pópulo (excluding Lagoa Parceira, Imaginário, and Casal do Tanqueirão) and the southernmost portion of the civil parish of Tornada.)
- Demonym: Caldense
- Time zone: UTC±00:00 (Western European Time)
  - Summer (DST): UTC+01:00 (Western European Summer Time)
- Postal code (código postal): 2500
- Area code: 262
- Municipal holiday: 15 May
- Website: www.mcr.pt

Caldas da Rainha (Note: European Portuguese: [ˈkaldɐʒ ðɐ ʁɐˈiɲɐ]) is a medium-sized Portuguese city in the Oeste region, in the historical province of Estremadura, and in the district of Leiria. The city serves as the seat of the larger municipality of the same name and of the Comunidade Intermunicipal do Oeste (OesteCIM, Intermunicipal Community of the West). At the 2011 census, the municipality had a population of 51,729 in an area of 255.69 square kilometres (98.72 sq mi), with 30,343 residing in the city. Although the city itself lies about 10.5 kilometres (6.5 mi) inland, three of the municipality's civil parishes lie on the Atlantic Ocean. Caldas da Rainha is best known for its sulphurous hot springs and ceramic pottery.

The settlement was founded in the 15th century by Queen Leonor (Rainha Dona Leonor), who established a hospital and a church at the site of some therapeutic hot springs. The Hospital Termal Rainha D. Leonor (Queen Leonor Spring Water Hospital, or Thermal Hospital) is the oldest purpose-built institution of its kind in the world, with five centuries of history. The city's name, often shortened to simply "Caldas", can be translated as "Queen's Hot Springs", "Queen's Spa", or "Queen's Baths".

Caldas da Rainha is a UNESCO Creative City. It is home to many cultural institutions. The city's nine museums cover art, history, and cycling. Cultural and sports venues include Centro Cultural e de Congressos (CCC, Cultural and Conference Centre), a centre for performing arts, exhibitions, and conferences; Expoeste – Centro de Exposições do Oeste (Exhibition Centre of the West), which hosts exhibitions and festivals; a bullring; several football (soccer) pitches; and a multi-sport municipal complex. Caldas hosts six professional and higher-educational institutions, including a major arts and design school and a school devoted to ceramics.

== History ==
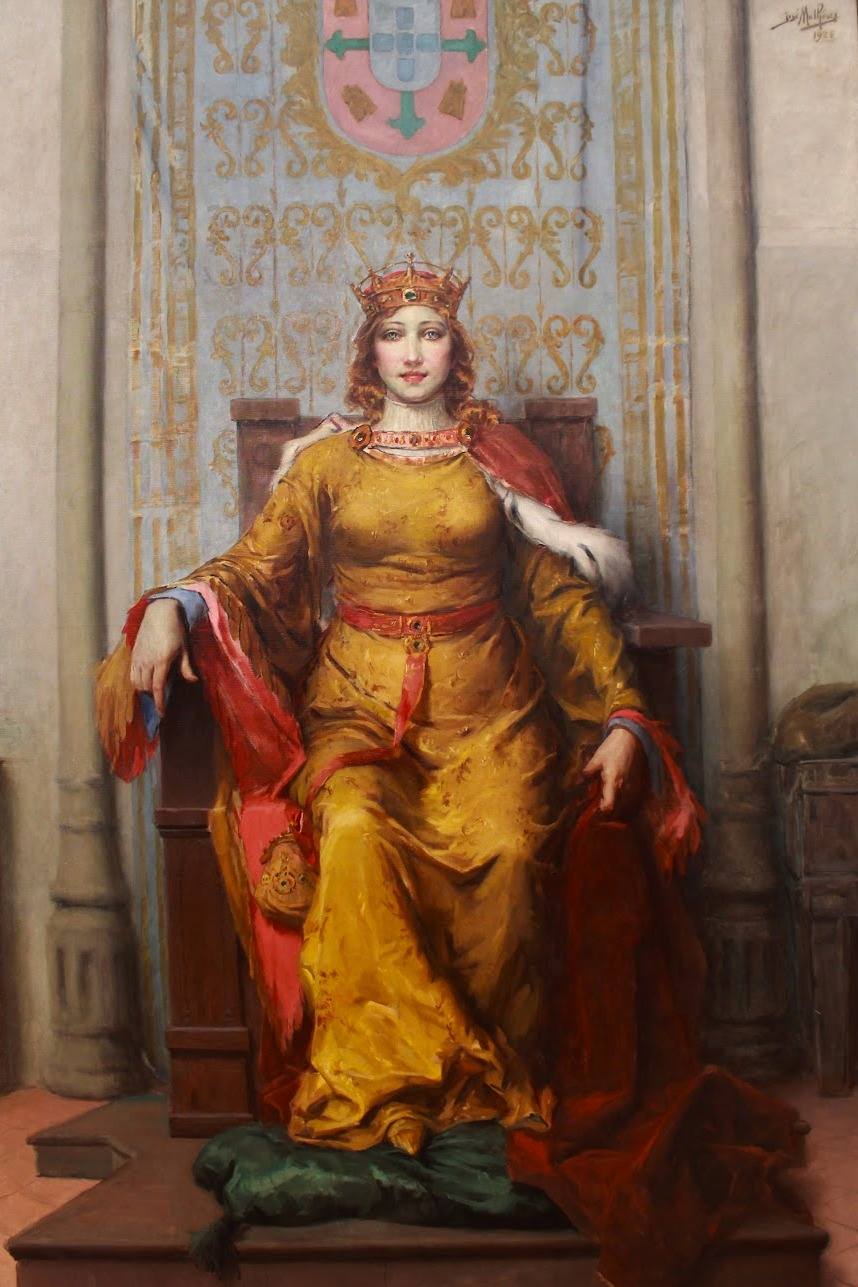
Non-contemporaneous portrait of Queen Leonor by José Malhoa

=== Early years ===
Caldas da Rainha was part of the ancient region Lusitania, inhabited by ancient Romans who took advantage of sulphurous waters sprouting in the region. Barbarian invasions destroyed most of the Roman-built baths. By the 13th century, the springs were known as "caldas de Óbidos", after the nearby town. At this time, a Benedictine order looked after the needs of the poor and cared for the lepers and rheumatics, who sought the healing waters. With the disbandment of the order by the 15th century, the area fell into disrepair.

Queen Leonor (Rainha Dona Leonor, in Portuguese), the wife of King João II, is credited as the founder of Caldas da Rainha. One day in 1484, while traveling from Óbidos to Batalha, she happened upon a group of peasants bathing in foul-smelling waters by the roadside. The queen stopped to inquire about this oddity, and the bathers told her that the waters possessed curative powers. She decided to try them and was pleased to find that she was quickly relieved of an unknown affliction that she had been suffering. On that site, the queen ordered a hospital built so that others could enjoy the same relief. Construction began the following year, and although the first patients were admitted in 1488, the works were not completed until about 1496 or 1497. To finance the hospital and its adjoining church, the queen sold her jewels and used income from her landholdings. The name of the settlement that grew around the site and became Caldas da Rainha refers to both its founder and the reason for its existence. The city's name can be translated as "Queen's Hot Springs", "Queen's Spa", or "Queen's Baths". The settlement's waters remain its major claim to fame.

On 21 March 1511, King Manuel I, brother of Queen Leonor, conferred the status of town (vila) upon Caldas da Rainha. In 1821, it was made a municipality (concelho or município).

=== Twentieth century ===
In 1901 and 1902, Caldas da Rainha welcomed 350 Boer men, women, and children who sought refuge from the ravages of the Second Boer War in their South African homeland. Initially housed in the thermal hospital, the refugees were transferred to the park pavilions at the onset of the bathing season. Some rented rooms in town, marveling at the low rates.

During World War I, in which Portugal joined the Allies, Caldas had one of three internment camps in the country. In 1916, most Germans in Portugal were deported, but men aged 15–45 were imprisoned to prevent their joining the German military. Originally, all of the approximately 700 prisoners were shipped to Angra do Heroísmo, on Terceira Island in the Azores, where they were held at the Fortress of São João Baptista. In 1918, to reduce overcrowding at the fortress, 168 internees were moved to Caldas, where they stayed in military barracks located at the Parque D. Carlos I (Pavilhões do Parque). The prisoners were released the following year, after the end of the war.

On 26 April 1919, President João do Canto e Castro granted the town the title of Dame of the Military Order of the Tower and of the Sword, of Valour, Loyalty and Merit (Ordem Militar da Torre e Espada do Valor, Lealdade e Mérito). Unlike other places similarly honoured, Caldas did not add the honour's collar to its coat of arms. The town was elevated to the status of city (cidade) in August 1927.

During World War II, in which Portugal remained neutral, hundreds of Jewish refugees came to Caldas da Rainha to escape Nazism. Caldas also served as home to British and American airmen who landed or crashed in Portugal or off its coast. In January 1943, 230 Britons resident in Axis power Italy were evacuated to Caldas, where they were expected to stay until the end of the war. Most of these evacuees were over 65 years of age and had resided in Italy for a long time.

In a prelude to the Carnation Revolution, in the early morning of 16 March 1974, the Fifth Infantry Regiment (Regimento de Infantaria 5), based in Caldas da Rainha in what is now the School of Army Sergeants (Escola de Sargentos do Exército), attempted to stage a coup d'état against the country's authoritarian Estado Novo regime. Thirty officers and about 300 sergeants and enlisted men from the regiment left their quarters at 4:00 a.m., heading for Lisbon, where they planned to occupy the airport. On approaching the capital, the Caldas regiment found themselves alone, realizing that the other units supposed to participate in the coup had not joined the upheaval. The regiment turned back and reached their Caldas quarters at around 10:00 a.m., locking themselves in and awaiting a siege. The compound was surrounded by various forces, which penetrated the base at about 5:00 p.m. The revolters were arrested and sent to various military prisons, where they were held until the Carnation Revolution on 25 April 1974, 40 days later.

=== Symbols ===
Caldas da Rainha's coat of arms was granted by Queen Leonor, before municipal coats of arms were typically used in Portugal. The centre of the city's arms consist of the queen's personal arms, flanked on the right by a shrimping net, to commemorate the fishermen who rescued her drowning son Prince Afonso, and on the left a pelican feeding its young, a symbol of her husband, King João II. Because of its early introduction, several elements of the arms violate Portuguese heraldic standards. The municipal flag consists of the coat of arms on a purple and yellow gyronny.

The municipality adopted a logo for marketing purposes, to project an image of "relevant historical tradition", "current dynamism", and "enormous potential in culture, economy, commerce, and tourism". The logo shows a stylised outline of Queen Leonor's crowned head in blue tones, representing the city's historical connection with water. Below the queen's image, the municipality's name appears in all caps in Eras Light. Below this "Câmara Municipal" is written in Gill Sans.

== Attractions ==
=== City ===
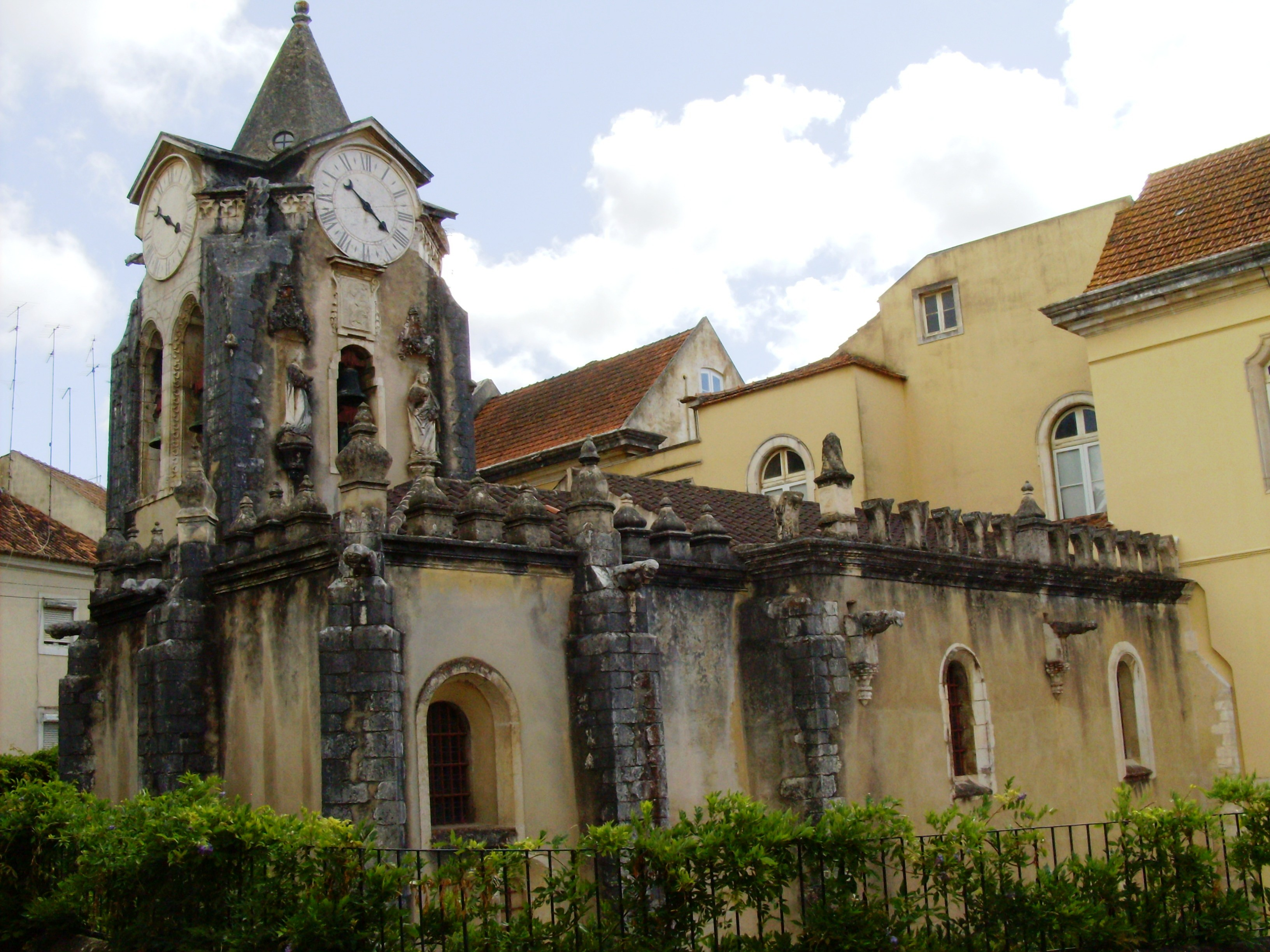
Igreja de Nossa Senhora do Pópulo (Church of Our Lady of the Populace)

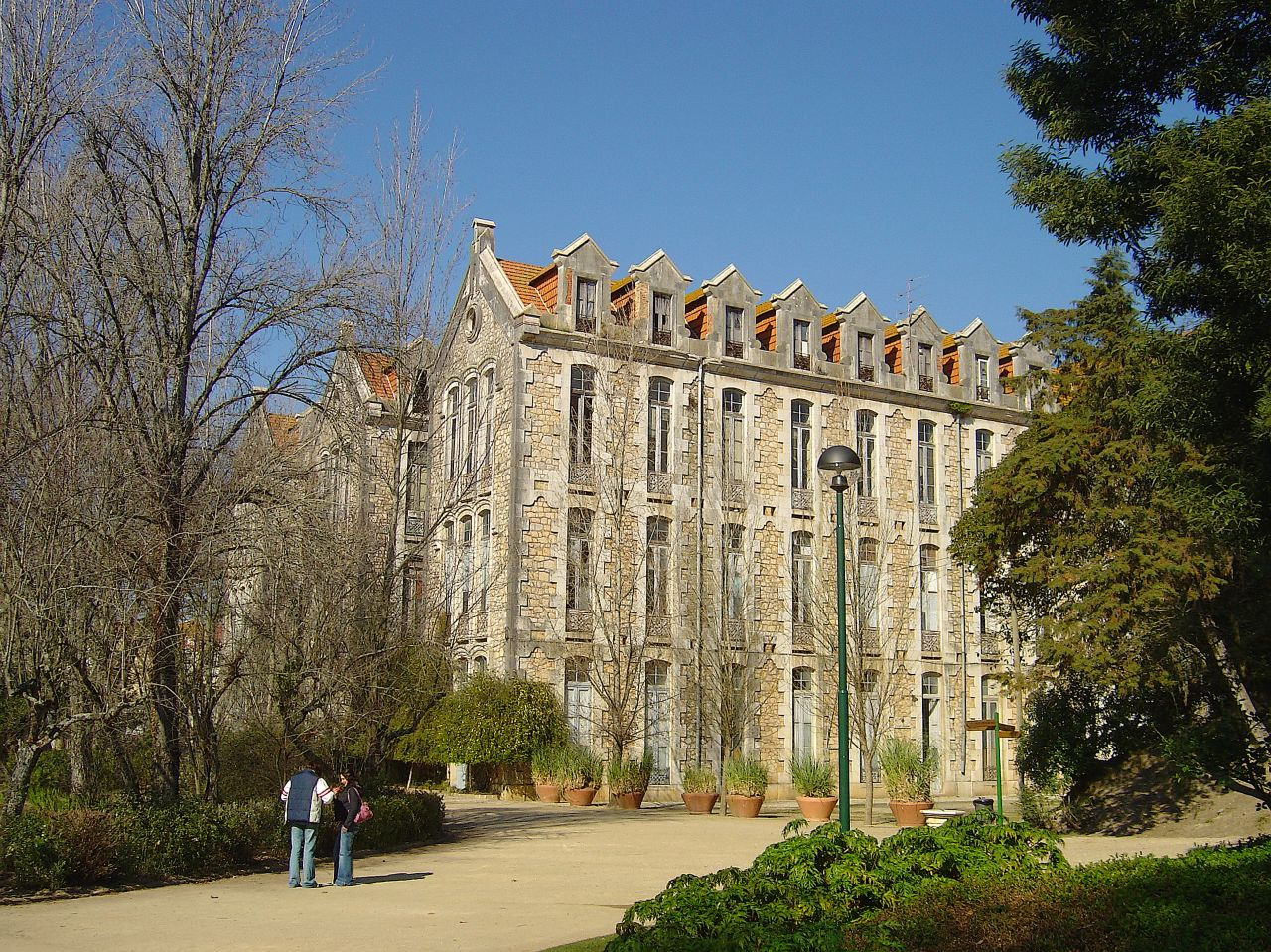
Pavilhões do Parque in Parque D. Carlos I

Igreja de Nossa Senhora do Pópulo (Church of Our Lady of the Populace), adjacent to the thermal hospital, is a late gothic church with Mudéjar and Manueline characteristics. It serves as the mother church (igreja matriz) of Caldas. It was built c. 1500 by order of Queen Leonor and designed by Mateus Fernandes. The church was declared a national monument (monumento nacional) in 1910. Igreja de Nossa Senhora da Conceição (Church of Our Lady of the Conception) is a 20th-century church located on Praça 25 de Abril, near the city hall and the courthouse, and surrounded on three sides by Hemiciclo João Paulo II (John Paul II Semicircle). The Cardinal–Patriarch of Lisbon broke ground on 20 August 1950, and the church was inaugurated on 21 October 1951.

Ermida de São Sebastião (Hermitage of Saint Sebastian) is a mannerist and baroque 16th-century chapel located just off Praça da República. An 18th-century reconstruction added tiles about depicting the life of the chapel's namesake saint. The chapel was declared a property of public interest (imóvel de interesse público, IIP) in 1984. Ermida do Espírito Santo (Hermitage of the Holy Spirit) is a mannerist and baroque chapel located on Largo João de Deus, uphill from the thermal hospital. Originally built in the 16th century, the hermitage was rebuilt in the 18th century. The chapel was declared a property of public interest in 1984.

Praça da República (Republic Square) is a public square in the centre of town. The plaza, popularly known as Praça da Fruta (Fruit Square), hosts Portugal's only daily outdoor farmers' market. The square is surrounded by buildings, most containing shops, banks, and cafés on the ground floor. Built 1747–1750 on the northern side of the square, the baroque former city hall (paços do concelho), now used by the junta de freguesia (civil parish council) of the União das Freguesias de Caldas da Rainha — Nossa Senhora do Pópulo, Coto e São Gregório, was declared a property of public interest in 1984. Praça 5 de Outubro (5 October Square), also known as Antiga Praça do Peixe (Old Fish Square), formerly hosted the city's open-air fish market, which has since moved to an indoor location (Mercado do Peixe). The plaza is now used for outdoor café seating and free cultural events. A statue of Queen Leonor stands in the middle of the roundabout at Largo Conde de Fontalva (Count of Fontalva Square), popularly called Largo da Rainha (Queen's Square).

The Parque D. Carlos I is a large park in the centre of town. The park contains a doughnut-shaped lake with a small island in the middle. Visitors can rent rowboats on the lake. The José Malhoa Museum sits in the middle of the park. The Jardim da Água (Water Garden) is a large-scale outdoor sculpture combining concrete, ceramic tiles, and water. Caldas has three mid-18th-century baroque fountains which were declared properties of public interest in 1982: Chafariz da Estrada da Foz (Fountain of Foz do Arelho Road), Chafariz da Rua Nova (Fountain of the New Street), and Chafariz das Cinco Bicas (Fountain of the Five Spouts).

=== Rural civil parishes ===
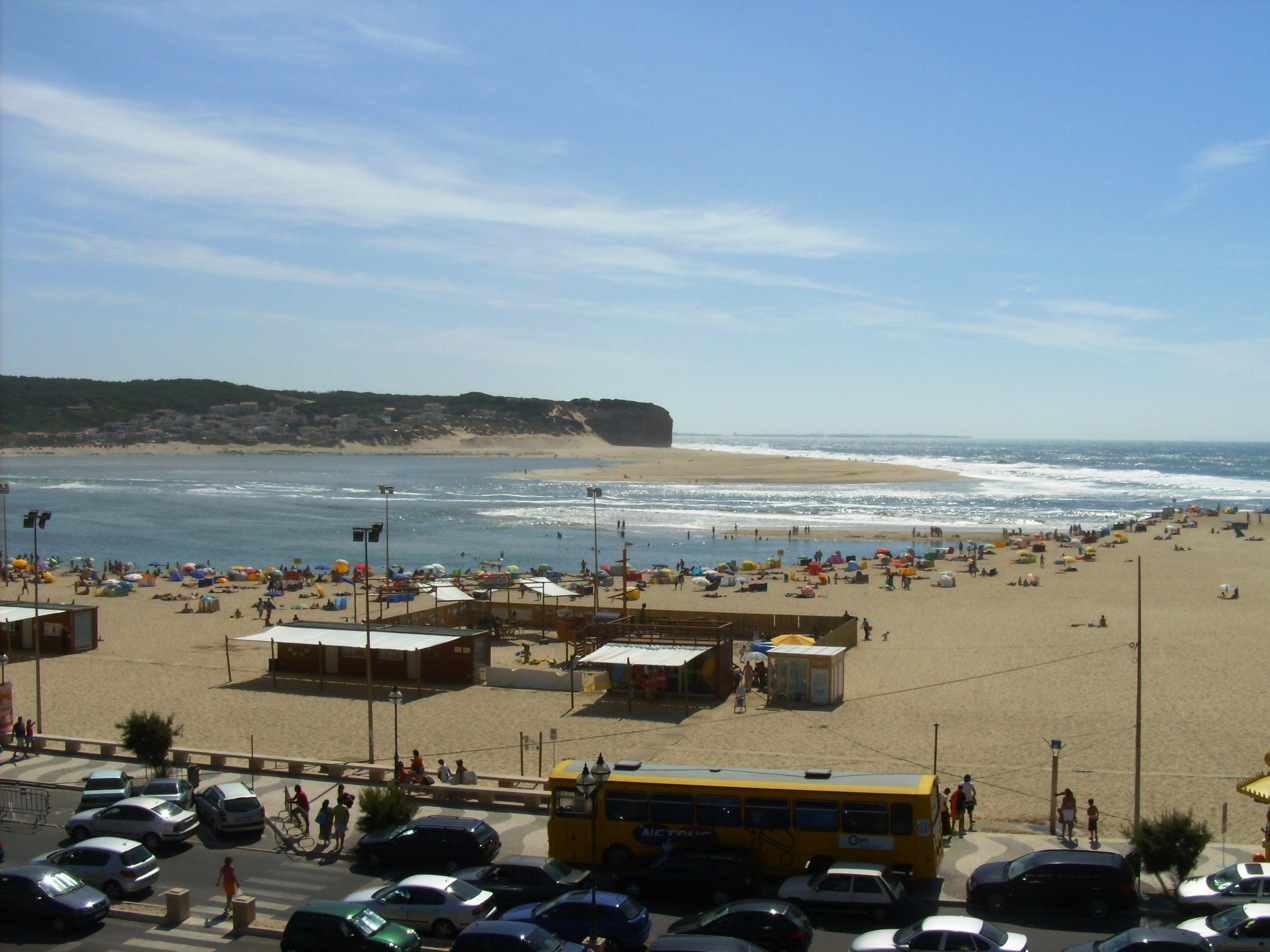
Beaches at Foz do Arelho: Lagoa de Óbidos and Atlantic Ocean

The civil parish of Foz do Arelho has a beach on the Atlantic Ocean, 10.5 kilometres (6.5 mi) from the centre of town. The Lagoa de Óbidos, which straddles the border with the municipality of Óbidos, is a lagoon that empties into the Atlantic Ocean near Foz do Arelho. The ocean beach and the lagoon beach have each been awarded a Blue Flag by the Foundation for Environmental Education. The civil parish of Salir do Porto has a beach on River of Tornada which empties into the Bay of São Martinho off the Atlantic Ocean. The Reserva Natural Local do Paul de Tornada (Tornada Swamp Local Natural Reserve) is a protected wetland area.

The Estação da Mala-Posta do Casal dos Carreiros (mail coach station of Casal dos Carreiros), built in the 19th century in the civil parish of A dos Francos, was declared a property of public interest in 1977. The Pelourinho de Santa Catarina (pillory of Saint Catherine) in the civil parish of Santa Catarina, constructed in the 16th century, was declared a property of public interest in 1933. Capela de São Jacinto (Chapel of Saint Hyacinth), located in Casais de São Jacinto in the civil parish of Coto, was originally built in the 16th century and reconstructed in baroque style in the 18th century. The chapel was declared a property of public interest in 2009.

== Urbanization and heritage degradation ==
Caldas da Rainha is a centuries-old city with a rich architectural heritage, whose center still preserves several historic buildings, notably influenced by Art Nouveau. It historically developed around its thermal activity, which gives it a distinctive identity within the Portuguese urban landscape. However, over the past decades, the historic center has experienced a certain degree of neglect, while urban expansion has taken place on the outskirts. This growth has often resulted in the construction of standardized residential complexes or buildings of limited architectural quality, to the detriment of aesthetic harmony and surrounding natural spaces. This evolution tends to significantly alter the character of certain neighborhoods by reducing the space allocated to nature and green areas. At the same time, several key elements of the local heritage remain underutilized or abandoned. This is particularly the case of the Hôpital thermal de Caldas da Rainha, considered one of the oldest thermal establishments in the world still in existence, as well as certain historic buildings located in the Parque Dom Carlos I. Their restoration and enhancement could, however, represent a significant driver of tourism, economic, and social development by generating employment and strengthening the city's attractiveness. In this context, several observers emphasize the importance of controlled urban development, avoiding the mistakes observed in other European countries during the 20th century, where rapid urbanization sometimes led to a deterioration of living conditions and heritage. Preserving local identity appears to be a central issue: it is about reconciling modernization with respect for the historic urban fabric, without turning the city into a standardized tourist destination. Thus, the future of Caldas da Rainha largely depends on its ability to protect its architectural heritage, rehabilitate its emblematic sites, and reintegrate nature into the heart of its urban planning. Maintaining its charm, history, and the well-being of its inhabitants remains essential to ensuring sustainable and balanced development.

== Geography ==
Caldas da Rainha, often shortened to just "Caldas", (Note: As evidenced by the names of the city's two printed weekly newspapers, Gazeta das Caldas and Jornal das Caldas.) is located in western central Portugal at 39°24′26″N 9°8′9″W. The city lies approximately 76 kilometres (47 mi) as the crow flies, or 91 kilometres (57 mi) by the A8 motorway, north of the Portuguese capital, Lisbon. Although three of the municipality's civil parishes—Foz do Arelho, Salir do Porto, and Serra do Bouro—lie on the Atlantic Ocean, the city proper lies about 10.5 kilometres (6.5 mi) from the ocean via the N360 road to Foz do Arelho.

The municipality of Caldas da Rainha comprises an area of 255.69 square kilometres (98.72 sq mi). The municipality extends 24 kilometres (15 mi) north to south and 22 kilometres (14 mi) east to west. The perimeter measures 106 kilometres (66 mi). At its lowest point, the municipality lies at sea level, and its highest point reaches 255 metres (837 ft). The municipality is bordered to the north by Alcobaça, to the east by Rio Maior, and to the south by Bombarral, Cadaval, and Óbidos.

Caldas da Rainha is the seat of the Comunidade Intermunicipal do Oeste (OesteCIM, Intermunicipal Community of the West). For statistical purposes, Caldas is in the NUTS III Oeste (West) subregion—coterminous with OesteCIM—within the NUTS II Centro (Centre) region, which is part of the NUTS I division called Continente (Continental, or Mainland, Portugal). The municipality is part of the Comissão de Coordenação e Desenvolvimento Regional de Lisboa e Vale do Tejo (CCDR LVT, Regional Commission for Coordination and Development of Lisbon and Tagus Valley). Caldas da Rainha belongs to the historical province of Estremadura and to the district of Leiria. In the Roman Catholic Church, the parish of Caldas da Rainha belongs to the Caldas da Rainha - Peniche vicariate of the Patriarchate of Lisbon.

Along with the rest of Continental Portugal, Caldas da Rainha is in the Western European time zone (UTC±00:00), observing Western European Summer Time (UTC+01:00) from late March to late October. The postal code for Caldas da Rainha is 2500, and its telephone area code is 262.

=== Freguesias (civil parishes) ===
Caldas da Rainha has 12 freguesias (civil parishes). Before 29 January 2013, Caldas had 16 civil parishes. On that date, a law came into effect causing the number of civil parishes throughout the country to be reduced. Seven of the municipality's civil parishes were combined into three new "unions of civil parishes" (uniões de freguesias, singular: união de freguesias). Nine civil parishes remained unchanged, except for minor border adjustments to ensure the contiguity of the new unions.

Freguesia (civil parish)	Population (2011 census)	Total area	
A dos Francos vila (town)	1,701	18.93 km^{2}	7.31 sq mi
Alvorninha (Note: According to a Gazeta das Caldas article, Alvorninha is a town (vila). Statistics Portugal, however, reports that Caldas da Rainha has only three vilas (but does not name them). Three other places—A dos Francos, Foz do Arelho, and Santa Catarina—have references to laws elevating them to the status of vila.)	2,987	37.60 km^{2}	14.52 sq mi
Caldas da Rainha — Nossa Senhora do Pópulo, Coto e São Gregório, União das Freguesias de	18,417	31.69 km^{2}	12.24 sq mi
Caldas da Rainha — Santo Onofre e Serra do Bouro, União das Freguesias de	11,926	27.51 km^{2}	10.62 sq mi
Carvalhal Benfeito	1,279	13.95 km^{2}	5.39 sq mi
Foz do Arelho vila (town)	1,339	9.62 km^{2}	3.71 sq mi
Landal	1,051	10.21 km^{2}	3.94 sq mi
Nadadouro	1,904	10.60 km^{2}	4.09 sq mi
Salir de Matos	2,583	24.59 km^{2}	9.49 sq mi
Santa Catarina vila (town)	3,029	19.98 km^{2}	7.71 sq mi
Tornada e Salir do Porto, União das Freguesias de	4,358	29.53 km^{2}	11.40 sq mi
Vidais	1,155	21.49 km^{2}	8.30 sq mi

Before the 2013 administrative reorganisation, the seven aggregated civil parishes had the following populations and areas, based on the 2011 census:

Pre-2013-administrative-reorganisation freguesia (civil parish)	Population (2011 census)	Total area	
Caldas da Rainha — Nossa Senhora do Pópulo	16,114	12.00 km^{2}	4.63 sq mi
Caldas da Rainha — Santo Onofre	11,223	9.21 km^{2}	3.56 sq mi
Coto	1,344	5.64 km^{2}	2.18 sq mi
Salir do Porto	797	9.86 km^{2}	3.81 sq mi
São Gregório	955	13.93 km^{2}	5.38 sq mi
Serra do Bouro	703	18.21 km^{2}	7.03 sq mi
Tornada	3,561	19.70 km^{2}	7.61 sq mi

According to the Instituto Nacional de Estatística (National Institute of Statistics, or Statistics Portugal), the city of Caldas da Rainha contains the entirety of Santo Onofre, most of Nossa Senhora do Pópulo (excluding the settlements of Lagoa Parceira, Imaginário, and Casal do Tanqueirão) and the southernmost portion of Tornada, but the municipal assembly does not accept any portion of Tornada as part of the city. Nossa Senhora do Pópulo and Santo Onofre are separated by the Linha do Oeste (Western Line) railway line, as specified in the 1984 law (effective 1 January 1985) that carved Santo Onofre out of the civil parish that was called Caldas da Rainha at that time.

=== Neighbourhoods ===
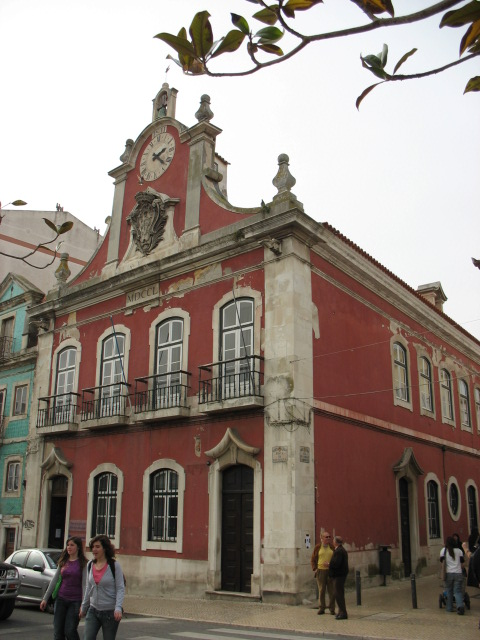
The former municipal hall stands on Praça da República. The building now serves as headquarters for the junta de freguesia (civil parish executive body) of União das Freguesias de Caldas da Rainha — Nossa Senhora do Pópulo, Coto e São Gregório.

The city of Caldas da Rainha has several named neighbourhoods (bairros). Centro (City Centre), in the middle of Nossa Senhora do Pópulo, is the heart of the city. Most of Caldas da Rainha's shops, eateries, businesses, services, government, and transportation are concentrated here. Public squares in the city centre include Praça da República (Republic Square) and Praça 5 de Outubro (5 October Square). Zona Histórica (Historic Zone), in Nossa Senhora do Pópulo adjacent to the city centre, is the oldest part of the city. The neighbourhood includes the thermal hospital, Igreja de Nossa Senhora do Pópulo (Church of Our Lady of the Populace), and Parque D. Carlos I (King Charles I Park).

Bairro Azul (Blue Neighbourhood), west of the city centre in Nossa Senhora do Pópulo, was named for its many blue-tiled buildings. The neighbourhood is home the city's silos, formerly used for storing grain, now a centre for innovative start-ups. Bairro Azul has several shops, restaurants, drinking establishments, and services. Bairro Avenal, south of Parque D. Carlos I in Nossa Senhora do Pópulo, is a residential area that includes some mansions. The neighbourhood is home to the ceramics museum and the multi-museum arts centre. Avenal contains some eating and drinking establishments. Bairro da Encosta do Sol (Sun Hill Neighbourhood), east of the city centre in Nossa Senhora do Pópulo, is a residential area with a few businesses. The hospital lies at the edge of the neighbourhood.

Bairro Além da Ponte (Beyond the Bridge Neighbourhood; commonly called Bairro da Ponte, or Bridge's Neighbourhood), in the centre of Santo Onofre, lies west of the railroad tracks that divide the city's two civil parishes. The neighbourhood developed during the late 19th century and was home to many of the city's ceramics workers. Bairro Cidade Nova (New City Neighbourhood), in the northern area of Santo Onofre, while mostly residential, is home to Expoeste, the largest exhibition centre in Caldas da Rainha. The neighbourhood is home to a few businesses. Bairro das Morenas (Morenas Neighbourhood, literally "brunettes" or "dark-skinned"), in the southern area of Santo Onofre, was originally built for social housing, but now includes other homes. Bairro dos Arneiros (Arneiros Neighbourhood, literally "sandy area"), in the western part of Santo Onofre, started out as a social housing estate comprising 96 flats, spread among six four-storey buildings, with four flats per floor. The edifices, built in two phases in 1998 and 1990, are predominantly white, each with a different colour trim. The neighbourhood has grown beyond the initial development and now has numerous businesses.

=== Climate ===
Caldas da Rainha has a Mediterranean climate (Köppen: Csb), with warm dry summers and mild rainy winters.

Climate data for Caldas da Rainha
Month	Jan	Feb	Mar	Apr	May	Jun	Jul	Aug	Sep	Oct	Nov	Dec	Year
Mean daily maximum °C (°F)	15.0 (59.0)	16.0 (60.8)	18.0 (64.4)	19.0 (66.2)	22.0 (71.6)	24.0 (75.2)	25.0 (77.0)	25.0 (77.0)	23.0 (73.4)	20.0 (68.0)	16.0 (60.8)	15.0 (59.0)	19.8 (67.7)
Daily mean °C (°F)	11.5 (52.7)	12.0 (53.6)	14.5 (58.1)	15.5 (59.9)	18.0 (64.4)	20.0 (68.0)	21.0 (69.8)	21.0 (69.8)	19.0 (66.2)	16.5 (61.7)	12.5 (54.5)	11.5 (52.7)	16.1 (61.0)
Mean daily minimum °C (°F)	8.0 (46.4)	8.0 (46.4)	11.0 (51.8)	12.0 (53.6)	14.0 (57.2)	16.0 (60.8)	17.0 (62.6)	17.0 (62.6)	15.0 (59.0)	13.0 (55.4)	9.0 (48.2)	8.0 (46.4)	12.3 (54.2)
Average precipitation mm (inches)	93.6 (3.69)	69.6 (2.74)	44.9 (1.77)	64.4 (2.54)	44.5 (1.75)	17.3 (0.68)	8.1 (0.32)	9.7 (0.38)	34.7 (1.37)	86.7 (3.41)	122.0 (4.80)	85.4 (3.36)	680.9 (26.81)
Source: Weatherspark.com, Climatedata.org Portuguese Environmental Agency

== Demographics ==
Between the 2001 and the 2011 censuses, the population of the municipality increased 5.90% from 48,846 residents to 51,729. Females made up 52.63% of the population, and males accounted for 47.37%. The population density was 202.3 inhabitants per square kilometre (524/sq mi). The 2011 census found that the municipality contained 20,598 families, with an average of 2.5 people per family. The municipality had 19,202 buildings and 31,063 dwellings. The population of the statistical city grew from 25,316 residents in 2001 to 27,378 in 2011, an increase of 8.1%. A resident of Caldas da Rainha is a caldense (plural: caldenses).

Historical population
Year	1656	1817	1825	1852	1864	1878	1890	1900	1911	1920	1930	1940	1950	1960	1970	1981	1991	2001	2011
City	800	1,313	1,444	1,860	2,268	2,691	4,687	4,605	5,851	6,837	7,822	9,632	11,821	11,185	14,712	18,394	21,420	25,316	27,378
Municipality				9,010	11,675	13,058	16,209	20,971	24,516	26,027	29,207	33,410	37,165	37,430	36,446	41,018	43,439	48,846	51,729
Sources and note:

== Government ==
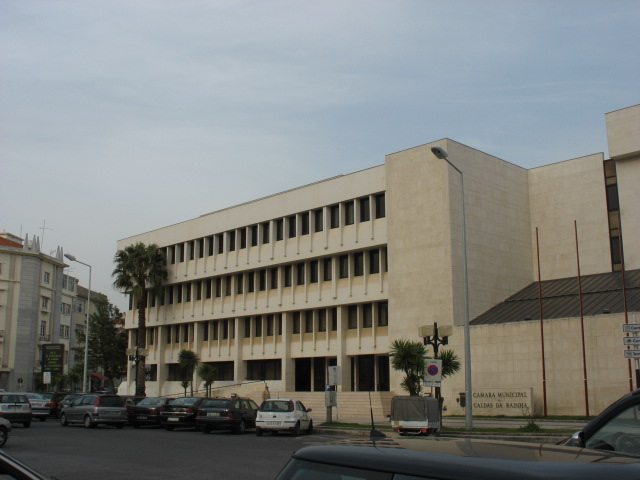
Caldas da Rainha's municipal building (Paços do Concelho), is located on Praça 25 de Abril.

The Câmara Municipal (city council, literally "municipal chamber") is the executive body of municipal government. The council is led by a president (presidente da câmara municipal, the mayor) and has six other members (vereadores, or councilors), as required by Portuguese law based on the number of registered voters in the municipality. Fernando Manuel Tinta Ferreira (PSD) serves as president of the council, and Hugo Patrício Martinho de Oliveira (PSD) serves as vice president. The other members are: Maria da Conceição Jardim Pereira (PSD), Alberto Pereira (PSD), Jorge Sobral (PS), Rui Correia (PS), and Manuel Isaac (CDS–PP). Fernando José da Costa, the prior mayor, now serves as a member of the city council of Loures, a suburb of Lisbon.

The Assembleia Municipal (municipal assembly) is the deliberative body of municipal government. The assembly has 33 members. The presidents of each of the 12 juntas de freguesia (civil parish councils) serve on the assembly. Directly elected members of the assembly number 21, triple the number of members on the city council, the minimum required by Portuguese law. Luís Manuel Pereira Monteiro Ribeiro is president of the assembly. Vasco da Cruz Antunes de Oliveira serves as the first secretary, and Maria João dos Santos Ribeiro Querido serves as the second secretary.

In addition to the junta de freguesia as its executive body, each civil parish has an assembleia de freguesia (civil parish assembly) as its deliberative body. Each body is led by a president, the presidente da junta de freguesia and the presidente da assembleia de freguesia, respectively.

Caldas da Rainha is twinned with the following places:

- Poços de Caldas, Minas Gerais, Brazil, since 2001
- Santo Amaro da Imperatriz, Santa Catarina, Brazil
- Huambo, Angola, since 1 May 2007
- Le Raincy, France, since 2008
- Figueiró dos Vinhos, sice 2013 (The place where José Malhoa lived and had his painting atelier since 1893 called "O Casulo", and where he died in 1933)
- Deruta, Italy, since 24 March 2024, due to its ceramics tradition

The municipality has intentions of twinning with the following places:

- Cambo-les-Bains, France
- Badajoz, Spain
- Coria, Spain
- Dinant, Belgium
- Lubango, Angola
- Perth Amboy, New Jersey, United States
- Ribeira Grande, Cape Verde

== Economy ==
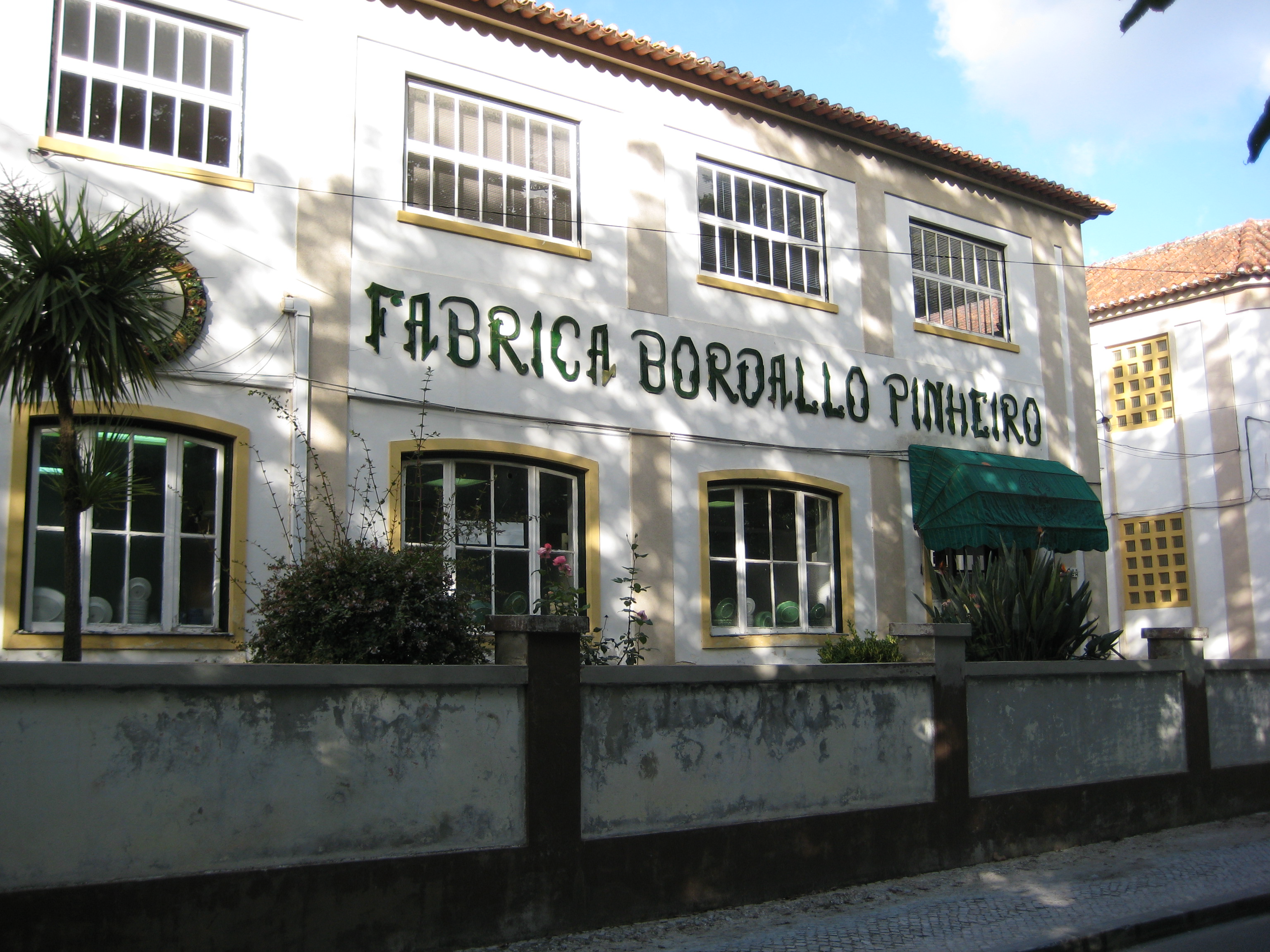
Bordallo Pinheiro ceramics factory

=== Commerce ===
Caldas da Rainha has about 600 commercial establishments and calls itself Capital do Comércio Tradicional (capital of traditional commerce). The city's downtown/city centre (centro) shopping area contains shops specializing in clothing, jewellery, beauty supplies, decoration, housewares, and other goods. The main shopping streets include Rua dos Heróis da Grande Guerra, Rua Almirante Cândido dos Reis (popularly known as Rua das Montras, Street of Storefronts), Rua Doutor Miguel Bombarda, Rua da Liberdade, and surrounding streets. Praça da Republica (Republic Square), popularly known as Praça da Fruta (Fruit Square), hosts an outdoor farmers' market every morning. A weekly market selling clothing and domestic items is held on Mondays uphill from the square.

Several small indoor shopping centres, most with only a few shops, exist throughout the city. The Associação Comercial dos Concelhos das Caldas da Rainha e Óbidos (ACCCRO, Commercial Association of the Municipalities of Caldas da Rainha and Óbidos), founded in 1902, promotes and supports commercial and service businesses in Caldas da Rainha and neighboring Óbidos.

Vivaci Caldas da Rainha, opened in November 2008 next to the rebuilt Hotel Lisbonense, was the first large shopping centre in Caldas. Vivaci's four floors contain sixty stores and services, including fourteen restaurants, a five-screen movie theater, and a supermarket. The CaldasShopping building, opened in December 2008 at the intersection of Rua Dr. Miguel Bombarda and Rua Raul Proença, has space for about forty shops, indoor and outdoor esplanades seating 200 to 250, offices, and thirteen apartments.

=== Statistics ===
Caldas da Rainha has ten lodging establishments, six of which are hotels (one 4-star, three 3-star, and two 2-star), and four of which are guest houses (pensões). Lodging capacity totals 948, with 790 in the hotels and 158 at the guest houses. In 2012, there were 25 banks in the municipality.

Average monthly earnings in the municipality is €894.81 according to 2011 data. Nova Serviços, with 1,504 employees, is the largest employer in Caldas and the second largest in the district of Leiria. Schaeffler Portugal, with 387 employees, is the second largest employer in Caldas and tenth largest in the district. Caldas counts three firms among the district's top fifty exporters: Schaeffler Portugal (5th), Promol (22nd), and Sotrapex (24th).

Based on 2018 sales volume, the top 20 business firms in Caldas da Rainha are:

Rank (Caldas)	Rank (Oeste)	Company	Industry	2018 Sales
1	4	Auto Júlio, S.A.	light vehicle sales	€110,710,627
2	8	Schaeffler Portugal, Unipessoal, Lda	manufacture of bearings, gears, etc.	€78,571,304
3	24	TS - Thomaz dos Santos, S.A.	wholesale minerals and metals	€42,260,205
4	35	Transwhite - Transportes, Unipessoal, S.A.	road shipping of goods	€28,013,897
5	38	AL Automóveis, Unipessoal Lda	light vehicle sales	€26,819,785
6	63	Promol - Indústria de Velas, S.A.	candle manufacturing	€16,643,889
7	65	LogiQueen, Lda	transport logistics	€16,337,745
8	88	LFG - Comércio de Veículos e Combustíveis, Lda	motor vehicle fuel sales	€13,596,033
9	93	RDO - Rodoviária do Oeste, Lda	interurban bus transport	€12,848,812
10	94	Auto Júlio II, Combustíveis, S.A.	wholesale petroleum products	€12,809,998
11	106	Manuel Rodrigues Ferreira, S.A.	wholesale construction materials	€11,458,575
12	116	Frutas Classe - Comércio de Frutas, S.A.	wholesale fruit and horticultural products	€10,887,194
13	125	Frigosto - Indust. Transf. Prep. Prod. Congelados, Lda	fish and seafood	€10,275,035
14	132	Becosa - Comércio e Distribuição de Bebidas, S.A	wholesale beverages	€9,630,905
15	133	Santos, Monteiro & Cia, Lda.	wholesale furniture, carpets, rugs, and lighting	€9,619,714
16	134	Casa Queridos, Produtos para a Agricultura, Lda	flowers, plants, seeds, and fertilizer	€9,613,627
17	138	PetroCaldas - Comércio de Combustíveis, Lda	motor vehicle fuel sales	€9,260,876
18	140	IVO - Cutelarias, Lda.	cutlery manufacturing	€9,096,136
19	175	Aki-D'el-Mar, Comércio de Mariscos Lda	wholesale fish, crustaceans, and mollusks	€7,656,229
20	183	Rodrigues & Lourenço, Lda	wholesale chemical products	€7,128,657

== Arts and culture ==
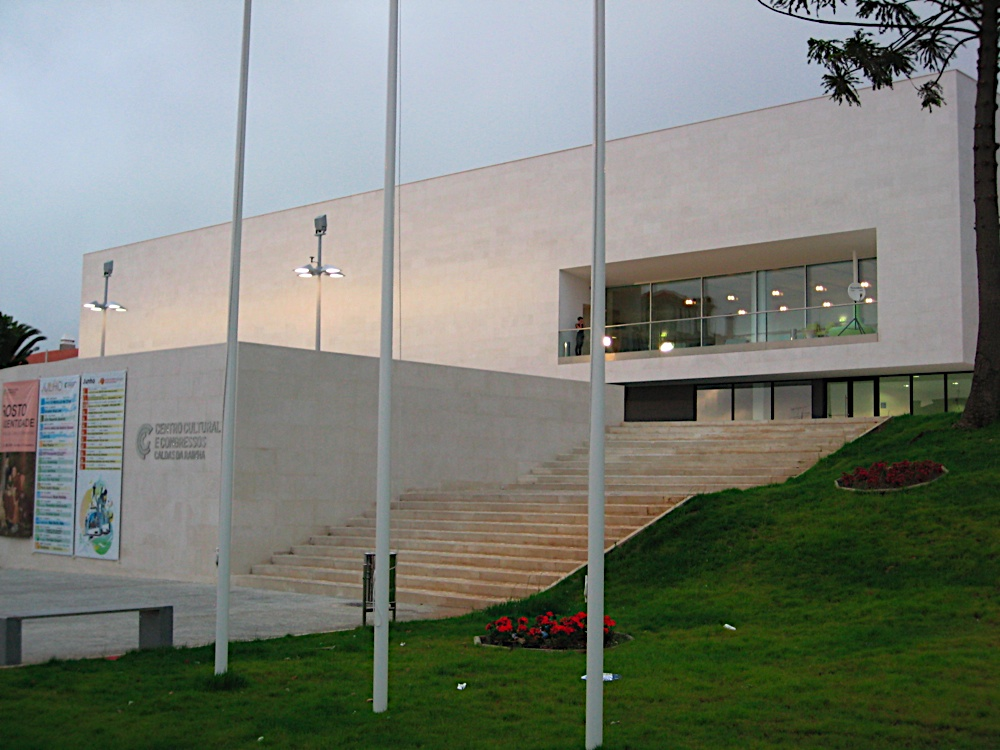
Centro Cultural e de Congressos (CCC, Cultural and Conference Centre)

In 2019, UNESCO added Caldas da Rainha to its Creative Cities Network for crafts and folk art.

=== Institutions ===
The Centro Cultural e de Congressos (CCC, Cultural and Conference Centre), inaugurated on 15 May 2008 by President Aníbal Cavaco Silva and Mayor Fernando José da Costa, is a cultural, performing arts, and conference centre that hosts music, theatre, dance, and cinema, as well as various expositions (expos) and conferences. Expoeste - Centro de Exposições do Oeste (Exhibition Centre of the West), is an indoor event space. The centre hosts various events, including bridal expos, seasonal festivals, fruit expos, car shows, and animal shows. During the annual Expotur - Festa de Verão (Summer Party), popularly called "tasquinhas", which takes place over the span of about week and a half at the beginning of August, food from each of the civil parishes is available for purchase and on-site consumption.

Caldas da Rainha has nine museums, covering ceramic art, painting, sculpture, local history, and cycling. The Centro de Artes (Arts Centre), a multi-building complex hosts three museums of sculpture: the Museu-Atelier António Duarte, the Museu-Atelier João Fragoso, and the Museu Barata Feyo. The arts centre contains the Pavilhão de Ateliers (Studios Pavilion)—providing workspace and residence for active artists—and O Espaço da Concas, exhibiting the paintings of Maria da Conceição Nunes, known as Concas. The Arts Centre hosts the biennial SIMPPETRA–International Stone Sculpture Symposium, with the resulting works being permanently displayed outdoors throughout the municipality. The Museu de Cerâmica (Museum of Ceramics), in an old manor house, exhibits ceramic pieces from Caldas, from throughout Portugal, and from international sources. Casa Museu de São Rafael concentrates on the ceramic creations of Rafael Bordalo Pinheiro's factory. The Museu do Hospital e das Caldas (Museum of the Hospital and of Caldas), installed in the Caza Real (royal house) where Queen Leonor stayed during her visits to Caldas, features exhibits related to the thermal hospital and the city. The Museu de José Malhoa, in the middle of Parque D. Carlos I, displays paintings by the namesake artist and his contemporaries, as well as sculptures and ceramics. The museum building was declared a property of public interest (imóvel de interesse público, IIP) in 2002. The Museu do Ciclismo (Museum of Cycling), opened in 1999 and sited in an Art Nouveau building on Rua de Camões across from Parque D. Carlos I, contains exhibits on the history of cycling and bicycles.

=== Traditions ===
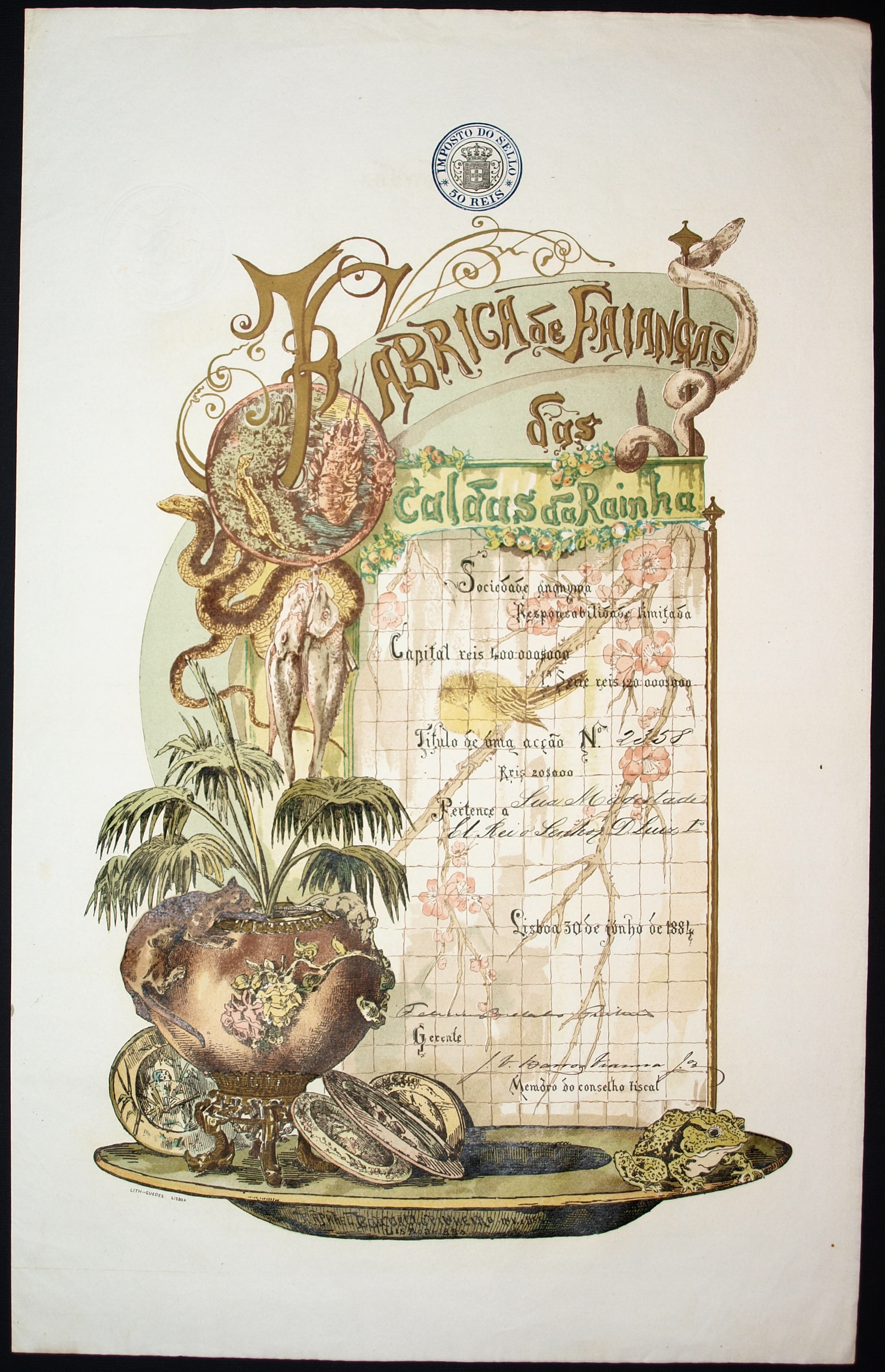
Share of the Fábrica de Faianças das Caldas da Rainha vom 30. Juni 1884

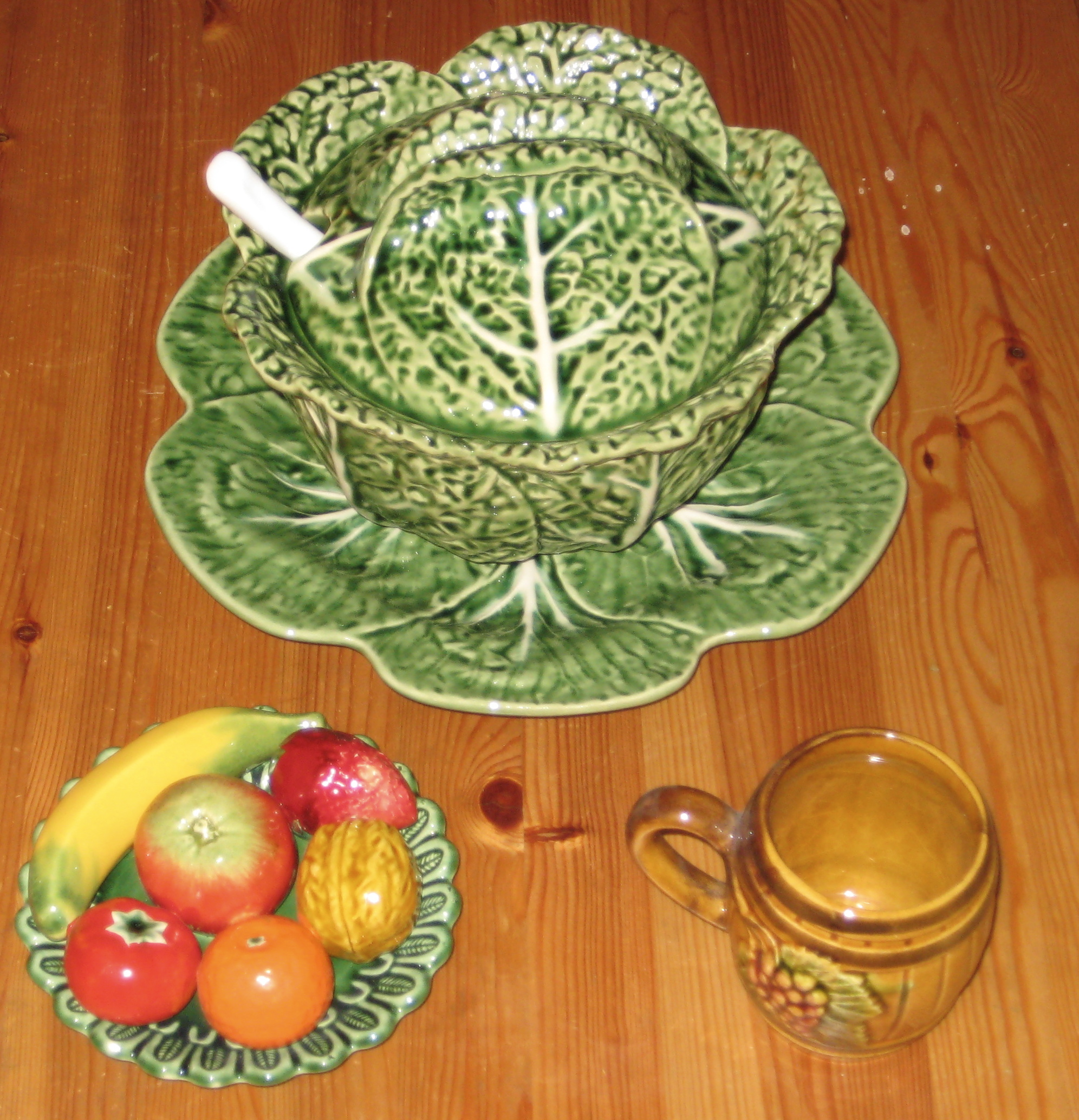
Examples of typical pottery from Caldas da Rainha

Caldas da Rainha is well known for its glazed ceramic pottery (louça das Caldas). The New York Times has called Caldas "[t]he capital of Portuguese pottery". The city is at "the center of a region rich in clay", where pottery has been made since the Neolithic Era. Caldas gained fame for its ceramic wares when Rafael Bordalo Pinheiro and his brother Feliciano founded their Fábrica de Faianças, now called Faianças Artísticas Bordallo Pinheiro. The factory's output includes large decorative pieces; tableware shaped like fruits, vegetables, and animals; and figurines of Zé Povinho, a bearded peasant everyman character. Caldas has a tradition of ceramic phalluses dating to the late 19th century.

Caldas has a tradition of embroidery (bordado) possibly dating to the 15th century. Legend has it that Queen Leonor's handmaidens, seeing the monarch without her usual brilliance after selling off her jewellery, embroidered her cloak so that it appeared to have golden threads. Caldas embroidery is almost always made with three shades of molasses brown thread on white linen, and on rare occasion with white thread on brown linen. Known for its symmetry, the craft's common themes include arachnids, spirals, angles, birds, hearts, crowns, and shrimp nets.

Caldas has several traditional sweets. Cavacas das Caldas are a small-bowl-sized, concave confection of flour and eggs, with a crunchy sugar covering. In June 2005, a 26-metre (85 ft) pyramid containing 48,900 cavacas was erected on Praça 25 de Abril in front of the city hall. Beijinhos das Caldas ("little kisses") are similar, but are smaller and spherical. Other local sweets include trouxas de ovos (poached eggs), lampreias de ovos (egg lampreys), and pão-de-ló do Landal (Landal sponge cake). Savory dishes typical of Caldas include ensopado de enguias da lagoa (stewed lagoon eels), bacalhau à lagareiro (cod in olive oil), polvo à lagareiro (octopus in olive oil), and fatias de carne frita à moda do Landal (Landal-style sliced fried meat).

== Transport ==
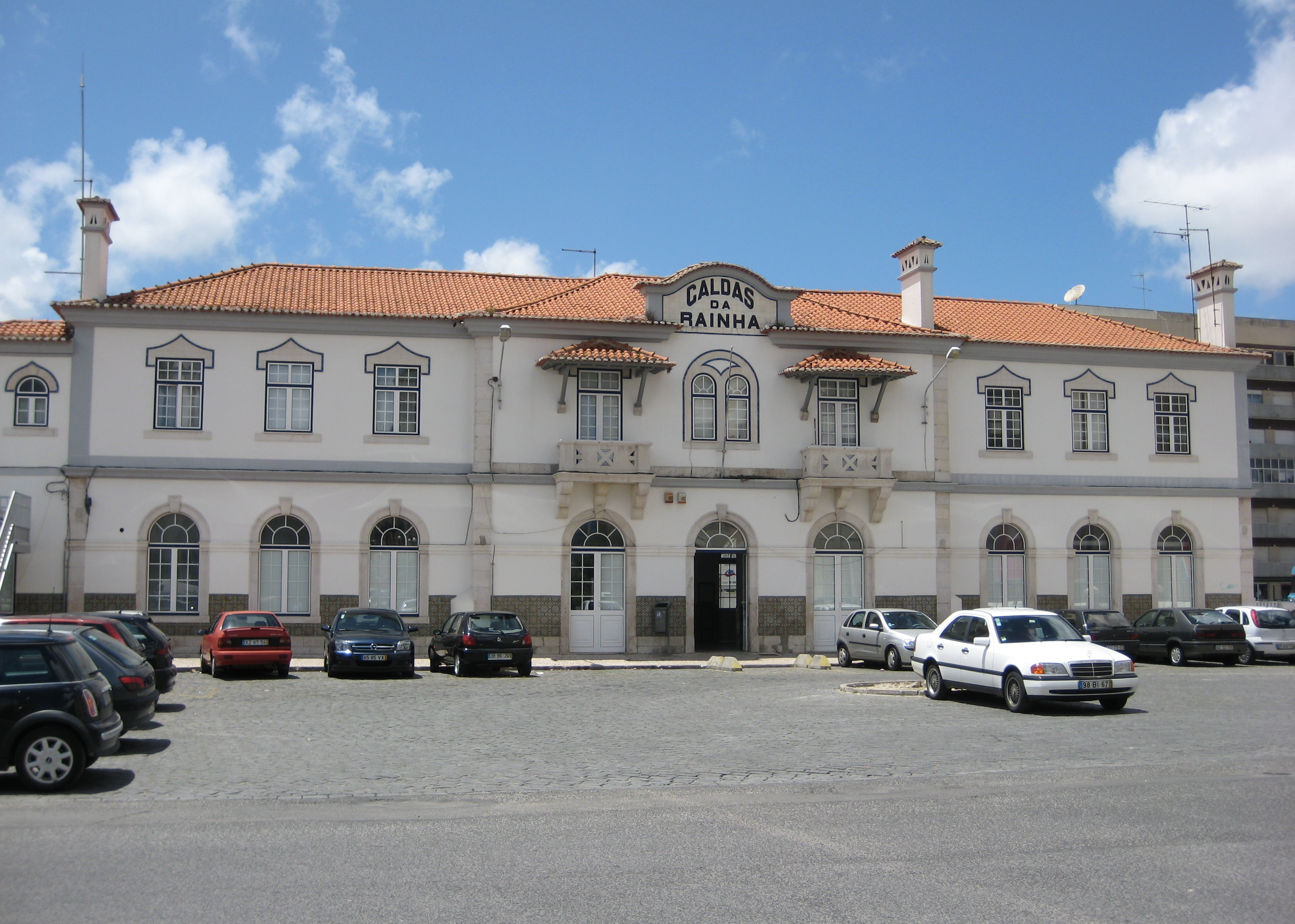
Caldas da Rainha railway station

=== Public transport ===
Caldas da Rainha has a railway station served by the Linha do Oeste (western line) of Comboios de Portugal. Regional trains, which make frequent local stops, run south to Lisbon, to its suburbs, or to Torres Vedras, and north to Leiria. Interregional trains, which make select stops, run north to Coimbra via Leiria. Salir do Porto, a civil parish on the Atlantic Ocean, is the next station north of Caldas and the only other active train stop in the municipality. Former train stops in the municipality are Campo–Serra and Bouro.

Caldas da Rainha has a bus station (terminal rodoviário) located in the city centre. Rede Nacional de Expressos provides express bus service to various destinations within Portugal. Rodoviária do Tejo (also known as Rodotejo) provides interurban services to the cities, towns, villages, and hamlets near and around Caldas. Rodotejo also provides three Rápida (literally "rapid", express-like, limited-stop) services from Caldas, serving Campo Grande in Lisbon, Óbidos, and Bombarral (Rápida Verde, Green Rapid); Leiria, São Martinho do Porto, and Nazaré (Rápida Rosa, Pink Rapid); and Santarém and Rio Maior (Rápida Caldas da Rainha–Santarém). The Caldas-based operations of Rodotejo became a separate company called RDO - Rodoviária do Oeste, Lda on 1 July 2015.

On 15 May 2007, the municipal holiday, the city council inaugurated local bus service called TOMA. The name means "take this" in Portuguese and commemorates everyman figure Zé Povinho, whose image appears on the buses. TOMA service consists of three routes: Linha Azul (Blue Line), Linha Laranja (Orange Line), and Linha Verde (Green Line). The Blue line uses two minibuses and runs between the western and eastern ends of town. The Orange and Green lines each operate using a single twenty-nine-seat minibus on loop routes.

"Projecto Tornada" seeks to improve bus services along the busy N8 road in Tornada, the civil parish just north of the city. The municipal government, in coordination with Rodoviário do Tejo and Rocaldas - Empresa de Transportes Auto Penafiel, has undertaken to distribute a combined schedule of services and to improve bus stops. Rede RoCaldas is an initiative to join intra-municipal bus service outside the city proper under a single banner and pricing scheme. Introduced in September 2013, Rede RoCaldas combines all services of Rocaldas - Empresa de Transportes Auto Penafiel with the short-haul services of Rodotejo. Rocaldas is a wholly owned subsidiary of Rodotejo, operating as a separate brand. The combined service promises various benefits, including use of the Rodotejo's central bus terminal, restructuring city-centre bus stops, more frequent service, and streamlined ticketing.

=== Roads ===
Caldas da Rainha is served by an extensive network of roads. Two motorways (autoestradas), operated by Auto-Estradas do Atlântico, serve the municipality. The A8 motorway, also known as Autoestrada do Oeste, goes south to Óbidos, Bombarral, Torres Vedras, Loures, and Lisbon, and north to Nazaré, Alcobaça, Marinha Grande, and Leiria. The A15 motorway goes east to Santarém via Rio Maior. The IP6 road is a main route (itinerário principal) connecting to Peniche, Rio Maior, Santarém, Torres Novas, Abrantes, and Castelo Branco. For much of its route, IP6 runs concurrent with various motorways, including the entire length of A15 and the portion of A8 in Óbidos. The IC1 road is a secondary route (itinerário complementar) which runs the length of the country from Valença in the north to Guia (Albufeira) in the south via Porto and Lisbon. North of Lisbon, IC1 runs concurrent with various motorways, including almost the entire length of A8.

Several national roads (estradas nacionais), which are older and not as well-maintained as motorways and main routes, serve the municipality. The N8 road (EN 8), the municipality's main roadway before the A8 motorway was built, crosses the municipality from north to south through the city centre, connecting with Alcobaça to the north and with Óbidos, Bombarral, Torres Vedras, and Loures—a suburb of Lisbon—to the south. The N114 road (EN 114), in the centre and southeast of the municipality, goes to Peniche, Rio Maior and Santarém. The N114-1 road (EN 114-1), in the centre and east of the municipality, connects the city centre to N114. The N115 road (EN 115), along the south and southwest border of the municipality, goes south to Loures. The N360 road (EN 360) crosses the municipality southwest to northeast through the city, connecting Foz do Arelho to Benedita in Alcobaça Municipality. The N361 road (EN 361), in the southwest of the municipality, connects Lourinhã and Rio Maior. Avenida Atlântica (or Variante Atlântica), which has no numerical designation, connects the western end of city to the beach at Foz do Arelho, and serves as an alternate route in lieu of N360.

== Education ==
Caldas da Rainha is home to many educational institutions. During the 2012–2013 school year, 10,882 students were enrolled in schools of various levels, from preschool to vocational and higher education.

=== Compulsory education ===
As in the rest of Portugal, compulsory public education consists of basic education (ensino básico) taught in "basic" schools (escolas básicas) and of secondary education (ensino secundário) taught in secondary schools (escolas secundárias). Basic education is divided into three "cycles" (ciclos): the first cycle (primeiro [1°] ciclo) for years one though four, the second cycle (segundo [2°] ciclo) for years five and six, and the third cycle (terceiro [3°] ciclo) for years seven through nine. Secondary schools teach years ten through twelve.

Caldas da Rainha has two public secondary schools, both of which also include the third cycle of basic education. The Escola Secundária com 3º CEB Rafael Bordalo Pinheiro (Rafael Bordalo Pinheiro Secondary School with Third Cycle of Basic Education) is in Nossa Senhora do Pópulo, and the Escola Secundária com 3º CEB Raul Proença (Raul Proença Secondary School with Third Cycle of Basic Education) is in the neighbourhood of Bairro do Arneiros in Santo Onofre. The Raul Proença school ranked as the best public secondary school in the country in 2014.

The municipality has three public schools which offer the second and third cycles of basic education without including secondary education. The Escola Básica 2, 3 D. João II (King John II Second- and Third-Cycle Basic School), in Nossa Senhora do Pópulo, offers classes to second- and third-cycle students only. The Escola Básica Integrada Santo Onofre (Santo Onofre Integrated Basic School), in the neighbourhood of Bairro das Morenas, offers all three cycles of basic education. The Escola Básica Integrada de Santa Catarina (Santa Catarina Integrated Basic School) offers all three cycles of basic education, as well as kindergarten. There are 27 public schools for the first cycle of basic education throughout the municipality. The municipality has 28 public kindergartens (jardims de infância). Several private schools offer kindergarten and first-cycle classes.

Colégio Rainha D. Leonor (Queen Leonor College), in Santo Onofre, offers private first-cycle basic education. For years five through twelve, the school offers privately managed public education. Colégio Frei Cristóvão (Friar Christopher College) offers privately managed public education in years five through nine in A dos Francos.

=== Higher, professional, and other education ===
The Escola Superior de Artes e Design de Caldas da Rainha (ESAD.CR, Upper School of Arts and Design), founded in 1990, is a division of the Instituto Politécnico de Leiria (IPL, Polytechnic Institute of Leiria). ESAD.CR offers courses in plastic arts, ambient design, industrial design, ceramic and glass design, graphic and multimedia design, product design, typographic design, theatre, sound, image, and cultural management. Former institutions of higher learning in Caldas include a campus of the Universidade Autónoma de Lisboa (UAL, Autonomous University of Lisbon) and a branch of the Escola Superior de Biotecnologia (ESB, Upper School of Biotechnology) of the Universidade Católica Portuguesa (UCP, Catholic University of Portugal) from 1999 to 2011.

Caldas da Rainha has five institutions offering professional development and vocational education. The Escola Técnica Empresarial do Oeste (ETEO, Technical Business School of the West) offers courses in business and technology. The Centro de Formação Profissional Para a Indústria Cerâmica (CENCAL, Vocational Training Centre for the Ceramics Industry) offers training related to the ceramics industry. The Centro de Formação Profissional da Indústria Metalúrgica e Metalomecânica (CENFIM, Vocational Training Centre of Metallurgical and Metalworking Industry) offers courses in metallurgy and metalworking. The Escola de Sargentos do Exército (ESE, School of Army Sergeants) trains sergeants for the Portuguese Army. The Escola de Hotelaria e Turismo do Oeste-Caldas da Rainha (EHTO, School of Hospitality and Tourism of the West) offers training in hospitality and tourism.

The Centro de Educação Especial Rainha Dona Leonor (CEERDL, Queen Leonor Special Education Centre) offers special education. The Conservatório Caldas da Rainha (CCR, Conservatory of Caldas da Rainha) is a conservatory of music. The Escola Vocacional de Dança "Os Pimpões" ("Os Pimpões" Vocational School of Dance) offers training in dance.

== Health and safety ==
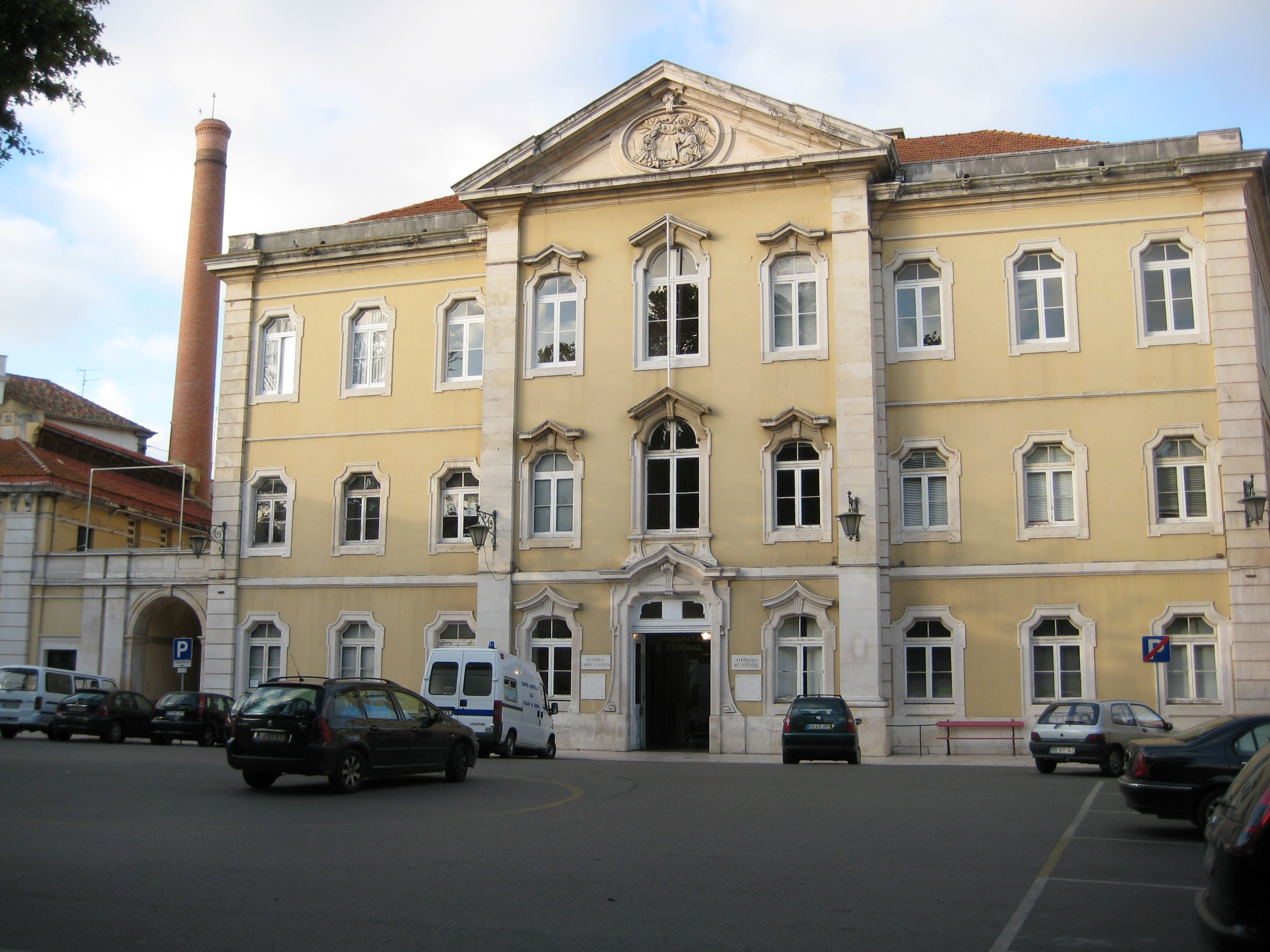
Hospital Termal Rainha D. Leonor (Queen Leonor Spring Water Hospital, or Thermal Hospital)

Caldas da Rainha is home to the Hospital Distrital Caldas da Rainha (Caldas da Rainha District Hospital), which is managed by the multi-city Centro Hospitalar do Oeste (CHO, Hospital Centre of the West). The hospital serves all general emergency needs of residents in all civil parishes of Bombarral, Caldas da Rainha, and Óbidos, plus parts of Alcobaça; paediatric emergencies for the aforementioned municipalities, plus Peniche; and obstetric and gynecological emergency needs for the aforementioned municipalities, plus Cadaval, Lourinhã, Mafra, and Torres Vedras. In 2012, the municipality had 326 inhabitants per physician.

The Hospital Termal Rainha D. Leonor (Queen Leonor Spring Water Hospital, or Thermal Hospital), a medical spa offering physician-prescribed treatment in sulphurous waters, is managed by CHO. The hospital is the world's oldest purpose-built thermal medical institution. Among the non-medical holdings of the Centro Hospitlar–legacies of Queen Leonor–are the Museu do Hospital e das Caldas (Museum of the Hospital and Spa); the Igreja de Nossa Senhora do Pópulo and Igreja de São Sebastião, churches; Parque D. Carlos I, a public park; and Mata Rainha D. Leonor, woods adjacent to the park. In 1512, Queen Leonor established the Santa Casa da Misericórdia das Caldas da Rainha (Holy House of Mercy), a charitable institution dedicated to helping those in need. Having expanded to other cities, the Holy House continues its work to the present day.

Caldas da Rainha is served by a health centre, Centro de Saúde Caldas da Rainha, which offers primary and non-urgent care. In addition to several units co-located with the main health centre, there are extensions located in the outlying civil parishes of A dos Francos, Alvorninha, Foz do Arelho, Landal, Santa Catarina, Tornada, and Vidais.

The municipality has fifteen pharmacies. Seven are found in the city, and each of the following civil parishes has one: A dos Francos, Alvorninha, Foz do Arelho, Landal, Salir de Matos, Santa Catarina, Tornada, and Vidais.

Fire protection is provided by the Bombeiros Voluntários de Caldas da Rainha (BVCR, Volunteer Firefighters of Caldas da Rainha). Police protection in the urban areas of the municipality is provided by the Polícia de Segurança Pública (PSP, Public Security Police). Rural areas of the municipality are patrolled by the Guarda Nacional Republicana (GNR, Republican National Guard). The GNR's base is located within the city proper.

== Sports ==
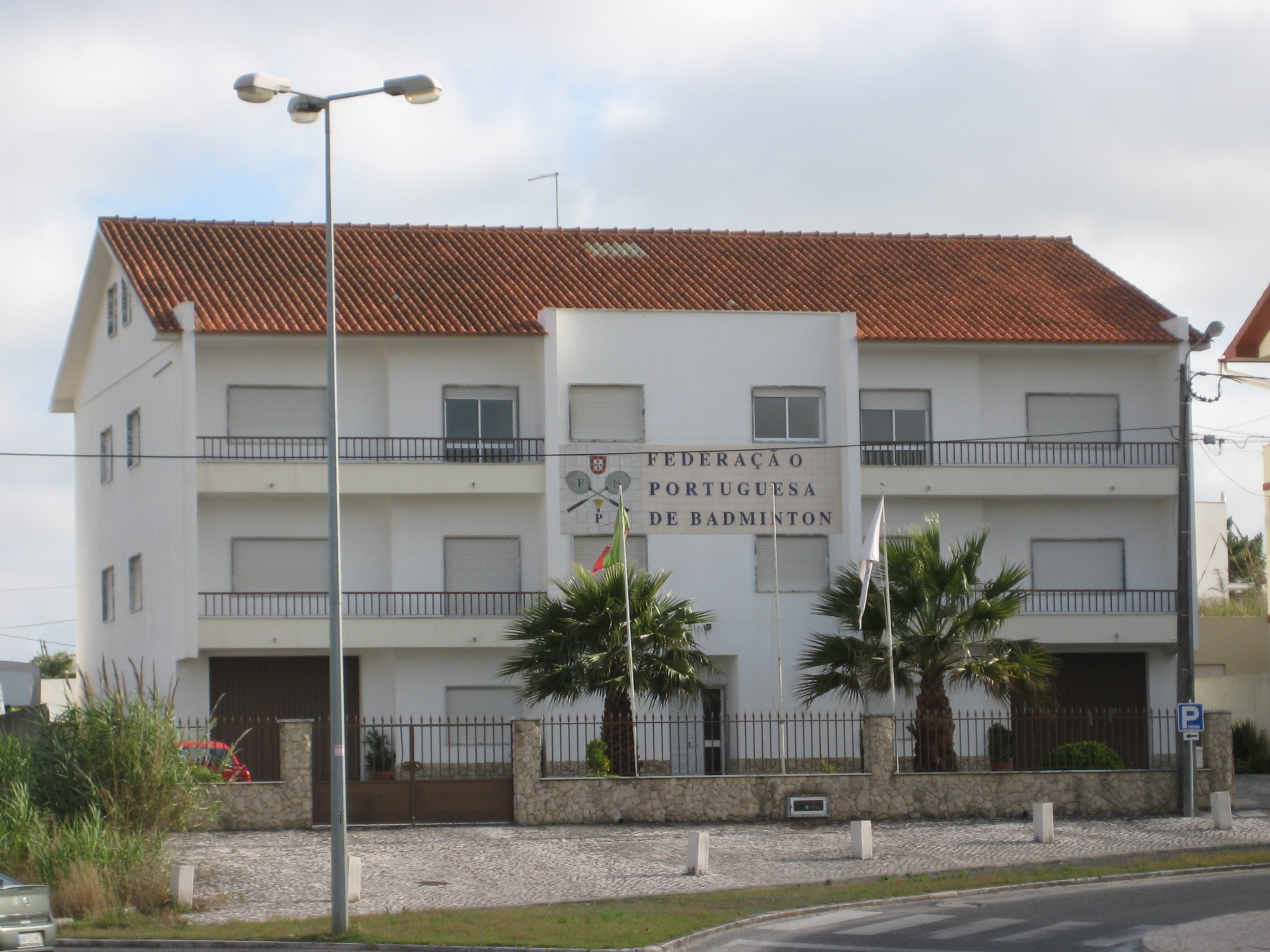
Headquarters of Federação Portuguesa de Badminton

The municipal Complexo Desportivo (Sports Complex), located on the western edge of the city in Santo Onofre, features a rugby field and a running track. The field is home to Caldas Rugby Clube and can be used for association football (soccer). In 2008 the municipality added five tennis courts (two of which are covered) in an adjacent facility. The municipal pools are located nearby.

Four multi-use sports pavilions are found throughout the city. Santo Onofre hosts a skateboard park. The municipality has designated five cycling routes, three of which can be used on foot. All five routes are in the western portion of the municipality, and one crosses into São Martinho do Porto in Alcobaça municipality.

Caldas da Rainha has a bullring (praça de touros) in Nossa Senhora do Pópulo, inaugurated on 13 June 1883. The octagonal arena originally seated 4,000 spectators, but now has capacity for 3,250. In a typical year, the ring hosts between three and six bullfights. The arena also hosts concerts. The Grupo de Forcados Amadores das Caldas da Rainha (Amateur Forcado Group of Caldas da Rainha) participate in a phase of the Portuguese bullfight wherein they attempt to immobilize the bull by grabbing it, using no tools but their hands and bodies.

Caldas Sport Clube (CSC) was founded 15 May 1916. The club sponsors teams in several levels of football (soccer) and futsal. The team's main pitch is Campo da Mata, a 13,000-seat field located in a wood adjacent to Parque D. Carlos I.

The Federação Portuguesa de Badminton (Portuguese Badminton Federation) is headquartered in Caldas da Rainha. The Centro de Alto Rendimento de Badminton (High Performance Badminton Centre) was inaugurated in Santo Onofre on 6 February 2010.

== Notable people ==
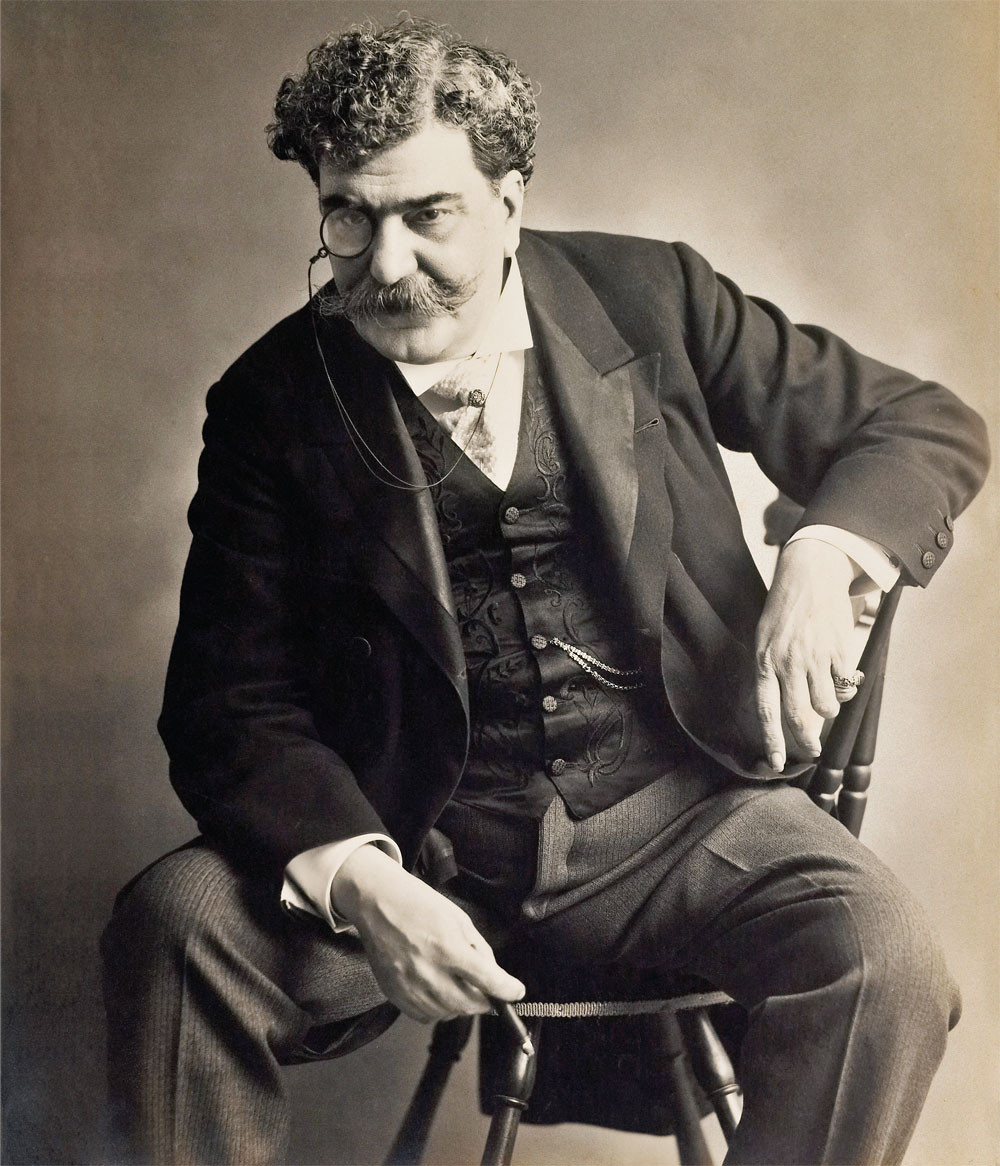
Rafael Bordalo Pinheiro

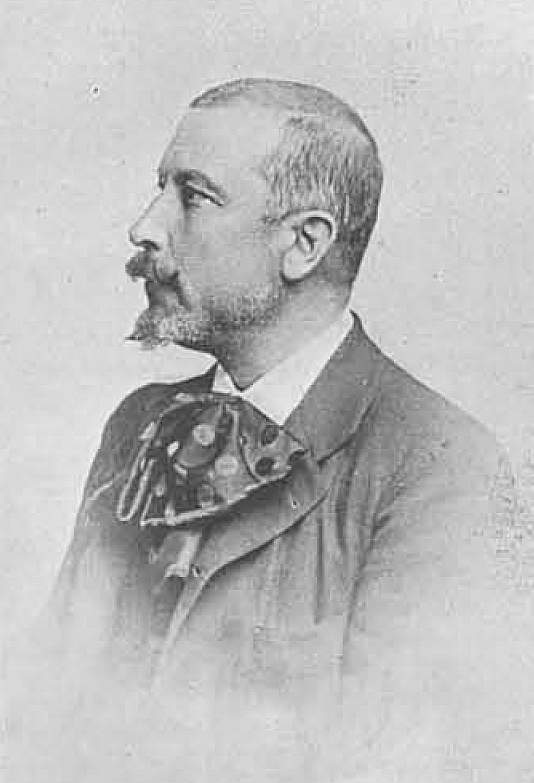
Jose Malhoa, 1889

- Queen Eleanor of Viseu (1458–1525) wife of John II of Portugal, founded the town
- Rafael Bordalo Pinheiro (1846–1905) was a caricaturist, illustrator, ceramist, cartoonist and figurist; co-founded Faianças Artísticas Bordallo Pinheiro, a ceramics factory in Caldas.
- José Malhoa (1855 in Caldas da Rainha – 1933) a Portuguese naturalist painter, the local José Malhoa Museum displays his works.
- Raul Proença (1884 in Caldas da Rainha – 1941) a politician, writer, journalist, and intellectual; a local public secondary schools bears his name.
- João Fragoso (1913 in Caldas da Rainha – 2000) a Portuguese painter, competed in the Art competitions at the 1948 Summer Olympics
- José Policarpo (1936 in Alvorninha – 2014) the 16th Patriarch of Lisbon from 1998; became a Cardinal in 2001.
- Vitalino Canas (born 1959 in Caldas da Rainha) a Portuguese lawyer, professor and politician

=== Sport ===
- Reinaldo Almeida Lopes da Silva (born 1965 in Caldas da Rainha) known as Reinaldo a former footballer with 231 club caps
- João Lucas (born 1979 in Caldas da Rainha - 2015) a footballer with 200 club caps
- Ricardo Campos (born 1985 in Caldas da Rainha) a former footballer with 174 club caps and 17 for Mozambique
- Gastão Elias (born 1990 in Lourinhã) a Portuguese professional tennis player
- João José Pereira (born 1987 in Caldas da Rainha) a Portuguese triathlete
- Frederico Ferreira Silva (born 1995 in Caldas da Rainha) a Portuguese tennis player
- João Almeida (born 1998 in Caldas da Rainha) a Portuguese cyclist
- António Morgado (born 2004 in Caldas da Rainha) a Portuguese cyclist
