= Ricardo Campos (footballer, born 1985) =

Portuguese/Mozambican footballer

Personal information
- Full name: Ricardo Jorge Francisco Maia de Campos
- Date of birth: 14 July 1985 (age 41)
- Place of birth: Caldas da Rainha, Portugal
- Height: 1.88 m (6 ft 2 in)
- Position: Goalkeeper

Youth career
- 1995–1999: Caldas
- 1999–2003: Benfica

Senior career*
Years	Team	Apps	(Gls)
2003–2004	Benfica B	19	(0)
2004–2005	Caldas	16	(0)
2005–2006	O Elvas		
2006–2008	Rio Maior	24	(0)
2008–2009	Olhanense	0	(0)
2010–2012	Caldas	59	(0)
2012–2013	Boavista	24	(0)
2013–2014	Torreense	18	(0)
2014–2017	União Madeira	12	(0)
2017–2019	União Leiria	1	(0)
2019–2020	Torreense	1	(0)
Total		174	(0)

International career
2003	Portugal U18	1	(0)
2013–2017	Mozambique	17	(0)
- * Club domestic league appearances and goals

Ricardo Jorge Francisco Maia de Campos (born 14 July 1985 in Caldas da Rainha, Leiria District) is a Mozambican former professional footballer who played as a goalkeeper.
