= Vidais =

- Civil parish
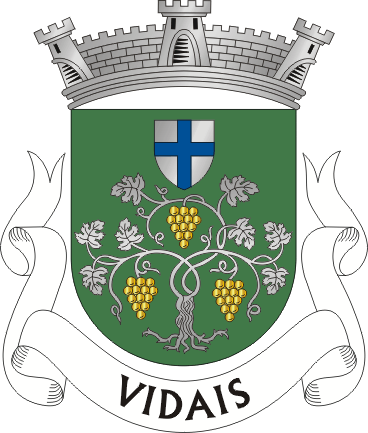
- Coat of arms

- Location in Portugal
- Coordinates: 39.369°N 9.053°W
- Country: Portugal
- Region: Oeste e Vale do Tejo
- Intermunic. comm.: Oeste
- District: Leiria
- Municipality: Caldas da Rainha

Area
  - Total: 21.49 km^{2} (8.30 sq mi)

Population (2011)
  - Total: 1,155
  - Density: 54/km^{2} (140/sq mi)
- Time zone: UTC+00:00 (WET)
  - Summer (DST): UTC+01:00 (WEST)

Vidais is one of twelve civil parishes (freguesias) in the municipality of Caldas da Rainha, Portugal. The population in 2011 was 1,155, in an area of 21.49 km^{2}.
