= Caldas da Rainha — Santo Onofre e Serra do Bouro =

- Civil parish
- Location in Portugal
- Coordinates: 39.411°N 9.149°W
- Country: Portugal
- Region: Oeste e Vale do Tejo
- Intermunic. comm.: Oeste
- District: Leiria
- Municipality: Caldas da Rainha

Area
  - Total: 27.51 km^{2} (10.62 sq mi)

Population (2011)
  - Total: 11,926
  - Density: 433.5/km^{2} (1,123/sq mi)
- Time zone: UTC+00:00 (WET)
  - Summer (DST): UTC+01:00 (WEST)

Caldas da Rainha — Santo Onofre e Serra do Bouro is one of twelve civil parishes (freguesias) in the municipality of Caldas da Rainha, Portugal. It was formed in 2013 by the merger of the former parishes Caldas da Rainha — Santo Onofre and Serra do Bouro. The population in 2011 was 11,926, in an area of 27.51 km². Along with Nossa Senhora do Pópulo, Santo Onofre is one of the two parishes which make up the city of Caldas da Rainha.
