= Landal =

- Civil parish
- Location in Portugal
- Coordinates: 39.316°N 9.022°W
- Country: Portugal
- Region: Oeste e Vale do Tejo
- Intermunic. comm.: Oeste
- District: Leiria
- Municipality: Caldas da Rainha

Area
  - Total: 10.21 km^{2} (3.94 sq mi)

Population (2011)
  - Total: 1,051
  - Density: 100/km^{2} (270/sq mi)
- Time zone: UTC+00:00 (WET)
  - Summer (DST): UTC+01:00 (WEST)
- Website: https://landal.home.sapo.pt/ (unofficial)

Landal is one of twelve civil parishes (freguesias) in the municipality of Caldas da Rainha, Portugal. The civil parish has an area of 10.21 square kilometres (3.94 sq mi) and had a population of 1,051 at the 2011 census.
