= Salir de Matos =

- Civil parish
- Location in Portugal
- Coordinates: 39.432°N 9.095°W
- Country: Portugal
- Region: Oeste e Vale do Tejo
- Intermunic. comm.: Oeste
- District: Leiria
- Municipality: Caldas da Rainha

Area
  - Total: 24.59 km^{2} (9.49 sq mi)

Population (2011)
  - Total: 2,583
  - Density: 110/km^{2} (270/sq mi)
- Time zone: UTC+00:00 (WET)
  - Summer (DST): UTC+01:00 (WEST)

Salir de Matos is one of twelve civil parishes (freguesias) in the municipality of Caldas da Rainha, Portugal. The civil parish has an area of 24.59 square kilometres (9.49 sq mi) and had a population of 2,583 at the 2011 census.
