= Igreja de Nossa Senhora do Pópulo =

Church building in Caldas da Rainha, Leiria District, Portugal

Coordinates: 39.4033625°N 9.1320305°W

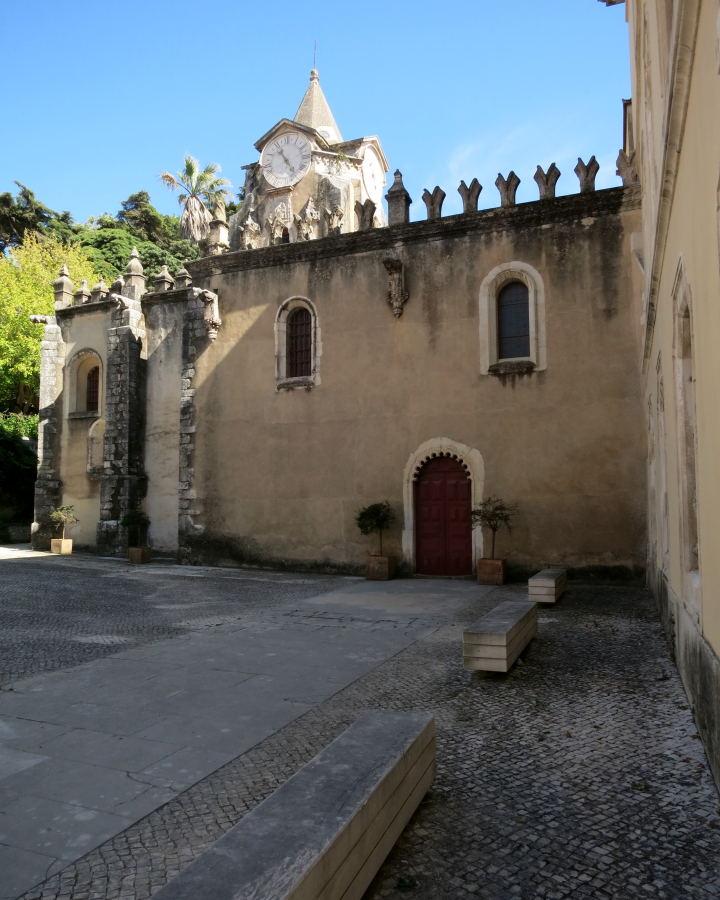
Igreja de Nossa Senhora do Pópulo

Igreja de Nossa Senhora do Pópulo is a church in Caldas da Rainha, Portugal. It is classified as a National Monument.
