= João Lucas (footballer, born 1979) =

Portuguese footballer

Personal information
- Full name: João Nuno Silva Cardoso Lucas
- Date of birth: 25 October 1979
- Place of birth: Caldas da Rainha, Portugal
- Date of death: 26 May 2015 (aged 35)
- Place of death: Porto, Portugal
- Height: 1.70 m (5 ft 7 in)
- Position: Defensive midfielder

Youth career
- 1989–1995: Alcobaça
- 1995–1998: Académica

Senior career*
Years	Team	Apps	(Gls)
1998–2004	Académica	101	(5)
1998–1999	→ Sporting Pombal (loan)		
2000	→ Anadia (loan)		
2004–2007	Boavista	86	(1)
2007–2008	Red Star	13	(1)
Total		200	(7)

International career
2003	Portugal B	1	(0)
- * Club domestic league appearances and goals

João Nuno Silva Cardoso Lucas (25 October 1979 – 26 May 2015) was a Portuguese professional footballer who played as a defensive midfielder.

He represented Académica and Boavista in his country, amassing Primeira Liga totals of 129 matches and three goals over five seasons. He signed for Red Star Belgrade in 2007, being forced to retire shortly after aged 28 due to heart problems.

== Club career ==
Born in Caldas da Rainha, Leiria District, Lucas began his career at Académica de Coimbra, making his professional debut during the 1999–2000 season (two matches in the Segunda Liga) and also being loaned twice to amateur clubs, after which he returned to become an important first-team member.

In 2004–05, Lucas signed with Boavista FC, where he consistently performed during three Primeira Liga seasons. On 3 February 2006, he scored his only official goal for the northerners, in a 3–0 league home win against Associação Naval 1º de Maio.

In the 2007 summer transfer window, Lucas joined Serbian giants Red Star Belgrade. However, on 17 March 2008, he announced his decision to stop playing football, as the 28-year-old had heart problems and the doctors told him he would risk his life if he continued playing. "This is the most difficult moment of my life but I have to thank everyone at Red Star who stood by me in the past two months", he told in a news conference.

== Death ==
Lucas died on 26 May 2015 at the age of 35 in his home in Porto. He suffered a cardiac arrest.
