= Carvalhal Benfeito =

- Civil parish
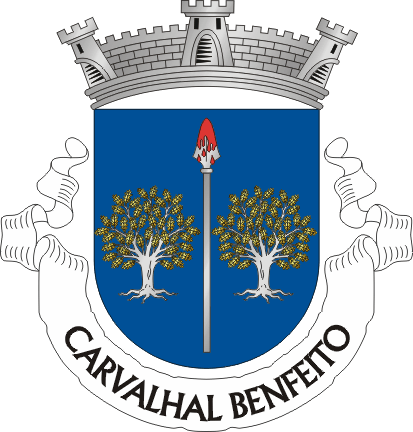
- Coat of arms

- Location in Portugal
- Coordinates: 39.442°N 9.044°W
- Country: Portugal
- Region: Oeste e Vale do Tejo
- Intermunic. comm.: Oeste
- District: Leiria
- Municipality: Caldas da Rainha

Area
  - Total: 13.95 km^{2} (5.39 sq mi)

Population (2011)
  - Total: 1,279
  - Density: 92/km^{2} (240/sq mi)
- Time zone: UTC+00:00 (WET)
  - Summer (DST): UTC+01:00 (WEST)

Carvalhal Benfeito is one of twelve civil parishes (freguesias) in the municipality of Caldas da Rainha, Portugal. The civil parish has an area of 13.95 square kilometres (5.39 sq mi) and had a population of 1,279 at the 2011 census.

== Villages ==
- Santana
- Cabeça-Alta
- Cruzes
- Antas
- Barrocas
- Quinta do Bravo
- Osseira
- Eiras
- Oliveirinha
- Casal Fialho
- Casal Pinheiro
- Casal dos Carvalhos
- Casal das Ladeiras
- Hortas
- Mestras
- Vale da Vaca
- Casal Novo
- Vale das Cuvas
- Casal da Azenha
