= TOMA (Caldas da Rainha) =

Overview
- Owner: Munícipio das Caldas da Rainha (city council)
- Locale: Caldas da Rainha
- Transit type: Bus
- Number of lines: 3

Operation
- Began operation: 15 May 2007
- Operator: Rodoviaria do Oeste

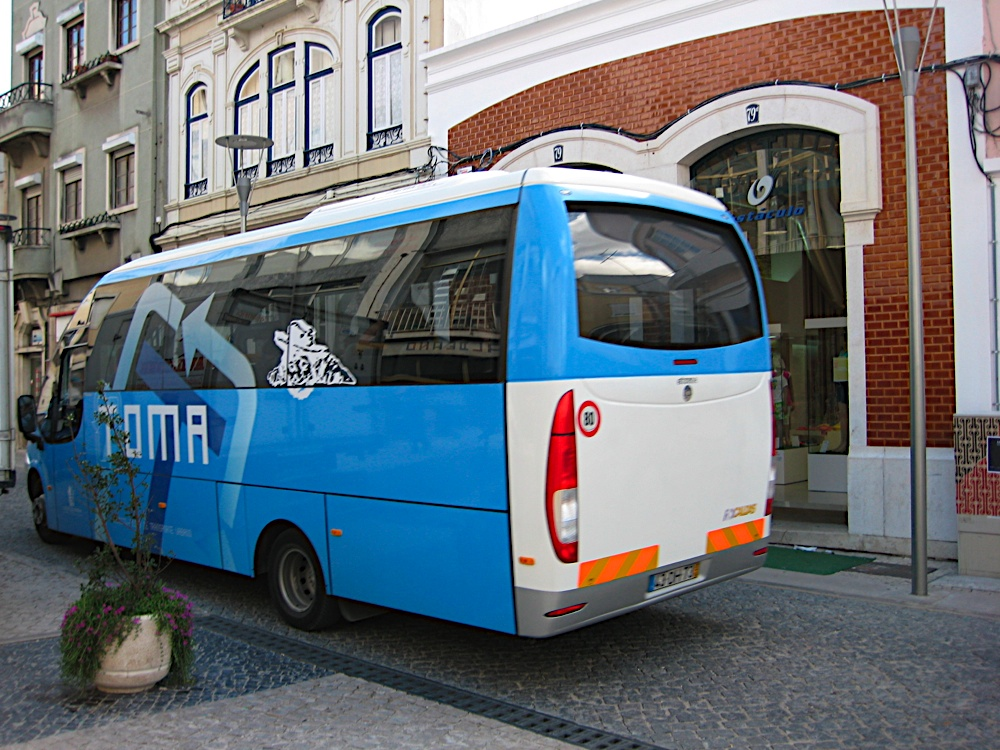
TOMA bus on Rua Heróis da Grande Guerra

TOMA is the local bus service in Caldas da Rainha city, administrative centre of the Oeste (intermunicipal community), Portugal. Toma means "take this" in Portuguese, commemorating everyman figure Zé Povinho. Service was inaugurated by the Câmara Municipal (municipal chamber, or city council) on 15 May 2007, the municipal holiday.

== System overview ==
TOMA service consists of three routes: Linha Azul (Blue Line), Linha Laranja (Orange Line), and Linha Verde (Green Line). The Blue line uses two minibuses and runs between the western and eastern ends of town. The Orange and Green lines each operate using a single twenty-nine-seat minibus on loop routes.

The Orange and the Green lines were inaugurated on 15 May 2007, as part of the first phase of TOMA service. In May 2008, the municipality announced TOMA's third route, the Blue Line, which serves the northern areas of the city not included in the two first-phase routes. The new route operates using two buses, rather than the single bus used by each of the other two routes. Introduction of the new line was delayed, because the company that won the bid to operate the line decided not to undertake the project after all. The municipality inaugurated the new route on 19 September 2009, Public Transport Day.

TOMA service runs from 7:30 a.m. to 7:30 p.m. on weekdays and from 8:00 a.m to 1:30 p.m. on Saturdays, with no service on Sundays. All routes operate at 30–35-minute intervals, except for non-rush hour service on the Blue Line, which runs hourly.

On 1 January 2025, Oeste (intermunicipal community) became the first region in Portugal with free public transport through Passe M Oeste, where residents, workers and students from the 12 municipalities of Oeste can travel by bus for free. TOMA urban public transport and Rodoviária do Oeste interurban public transport have benefited from this measure.

For non-residents, non-students and non-workers, TOMA's trips include the following types - the TTT - TOMA Transport Ticket (pre-purchased ticket system) and pre-paid cards, in the TRAVEL-A-TRAVEL and DAY-TO-DAY types. These cards are sold at the TOMA service point (commercial agency at the Rodoviária do Oeste terminal) or on board the vehicle.

== Linha Azul (Blue Line) ==
On westbound trips, the Linha Azul (Blue Line) stops at:

- Mercado (weekly market/fairground)
- Belver (neighborhood)
- Hospital
- Cinco Bicas (fountain)
- Chafariz (fountain)
- Montepio (health organization)
- Câmara (city hall)
- PSP (police station)
- Quinta Canários/Avelar Couto (neighborhood)
- Quinta Canários/Hotel
- Hortas (factory)
- Cutileira (neighborhood)
- Centro de Saúde (health center)
- Centro Escolar Santo Onofre (school)
- Cidade Nova (neighborhood)
- Badajoz
- Expoeste (special events center)
- Raúl Proença (secondary school)
- D. João II (street)
- CAR Badminton
- Colégio (private school)
- Rugby

On eastbound trips, the Linha Azul (Blue Line) stops at:

- Rugby
- Piscinas (municipal pools)
- CAR Badminton
- Arneiros (neighborhood)
- Raúl Proença (secondary school)
- Expoeste (special events center)
- Badajoz
- Cidade Nova (neighborhood)
- Centro Escolar Santo Onofre (school)
- Centro de Saúde (health center)
- Cutileira (neighborhood)
- Hortas (factory)
- Quinta Canários/Hotel
- Quinta Canários/Avelar Couto (neighborhood)
- EB2,3 D. João II (middle school)
- Montepio (health organization)
- Heróis da Grande Guerra (pedestrianized downtown shopping street)
- Rainha (roundabout with statue of Queen Leonor)
- Praça da Fruta (main square, daily farmers market, official name: Praça da República)
- Hospital
- Univ. Católica (university)
- Colina do Sol (neighborhood)
- Santa Rita (neighborhood)
- Residências Montepio (senior housing)
- Gago Coutinho (crossroads in neighborhood)
- Mercado (weekly market/fairground)

== Linha Laranja (Orange Line) ==
The Linha Laranja (Orange Line) is a unidirectional loop route which stops at:

- Rodoviária (bus station)
- Cinco Bicas (fountain)
- Hospital
- Univ. Católica (university)
- Encosta do Sol (neighborhood)
- Chafariz (fountain)
- Montepio (health organization)
- Heróis da Grande Guerra (pedestrianized downtown shopping street)
- Rainha (roundabout with statue of Queen Leonor)
- Bairro Azul
- Biblioteca (library)
- Cencal (ceramics school)
- Quinta dos Pinheiros 1
- Unid. Saude S. Onofre (health unit)
- Morenas
- Quinta dos Pinheiros 2
- Hortas Urbanas
- Rugby
- Piscinas (municipal pools)
- CAR Badminton
- Arneiros (neighborhood)
- Fonte Luminosa (fountain)
- Centro de Saúde (health center)
- Estação CP (railway station)
- Câmara (city hall)

== Linha Verde (Green Line) ==
The Linha Verde (Green Line) is a unidirectional loop route which stops at:

- Rainha (roundabout with statue of Queen Leonor)
- Parque (park)
- Centro D'Artes (arts center)
- Avenal Escola (school)
- Avenal (neighborhood)
- Centro Paroquial (parochial centre)
- ESAD (Escola Superior de Artes e Design, art and design college)
- S. João de Deus (street)
- EBI (Escola Basica Integrada de Santo Onofre, primary and middle school)
- Morenas/Jardim Infância
- Bairro Rainha D. Leonor
- Morenas (neighborhood)
- ETEO (Escola Técnica Empresarial do Oeste, professional school)
- Ponte (bridge)
- Bairro da Ponte (neighborhood)
- Fonte Luminosa (fountain)
- Centro de Saúde (health center)
- Estação CP (railway station)
- Câmara (city hall)
- Rodoviária (bus station)
- Cinco Bicas(fountain)
- Hospital
- Chafariz (fountain)
- Montepio (health organization)
- Heróis da Grande Guerra (pedestrianized downtown shopping street)

== Buses ==
In April 2025, the Câmara Municipal announced new city bus with a new image and more capacity than the previous minibuses

The old minibus of Caldas da Rainha

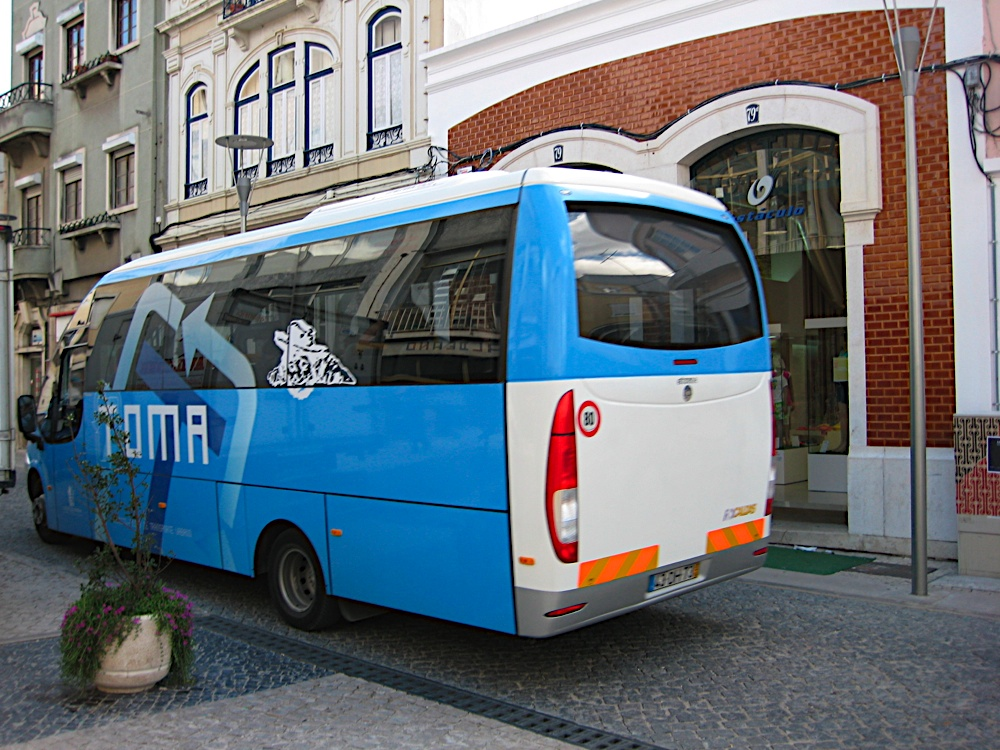
