= Tornada e Salir do Porto =

- Civil parish
- Location in Portugal
- Coordinates: 39.448°N 9.129°W
- Country: Portugal
- Region: Oeste e Vale do Tejo
- Intermunic. comm.: Oeste
- District: Leiria
- Municipality: Caldas da Rainha

Area
  - Total: 29.53 km^{2} (11.40 sq mi)

Population (2011)
  - Total: 4,358
  - Density: 150/km^{2} (380/sq mi)
- Time zone: UTC+00:00 (WET)
  - Summer (DST): UTC+01:00 (WEST)

Tornada e Salir do Porto is one of twelve civil parishes (freguesias) in the municipality of Caldas da Rainha, Portugal. It was formed in 2013 by the merger of the former parishes Tornada and Salir do Porto. The population in 2011 was 4,358, in an area of 29.53 km².

== Villages ==
- Bairro Social
- Campo
- Chão da Parada
- Reguengo da Parada
- Casais Morgados
- Mouraria
- Casais de Salir do Porto
- Bouro
