= Caldas da Rainha — Nossa Senhora do Pópulo, Coto e São Gregório =

- Civil parish
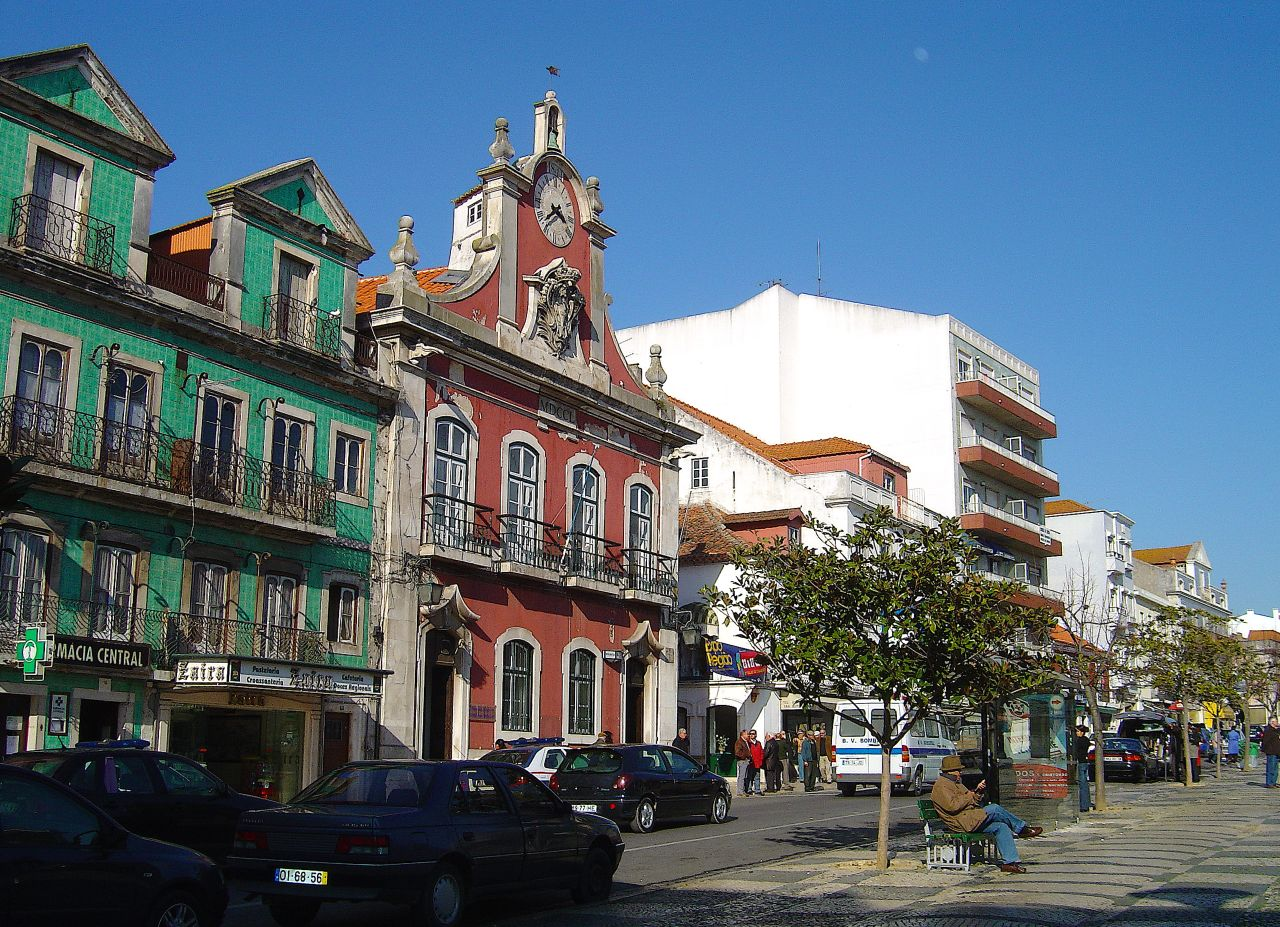
- Headquarters (the pink building) of the civil parish on Praça da República

- Location in Portugal
- Coordinates: 39.395°N 9.119°W
- Country: Portugal
- Region: Oeste e Vale do Tejo
- Intermunic. comm.: Oeste
- District: Leiria
- Municipality: Caldas da Rainha

Area
  - Total: 31.69 km^{2} (12.24 sq mi)

Population (2011)
  - Total: 18,417
  - Density: 581.2/km^{2} (1,505/sq mi)
- Time zone: UTC+00:00 (WET)
  - Summer (DST): UTC+01:00 (WEST)

Caldas da Rainha — Nossa Senhora do Pópulo, Coto e São Gregório is one of twelve civil parishes (freguesias) in the municipality of Caldas da Rainha, Portugal. It was formed in 2013 by the merger of the former parishes Caldas da Rainha — Nossa Senhora do Pópulo, Coto and São Gregório. The population in 2011 was 18,417, in an area of 31.69 km^{2}.
