= List of freguesias of Portugal: C =

The freguesias (civil parishes) of Portugal are listed in by municipality according to the following format:

- concelho
  - freguesias

== Cabeceiras de Basto ==
- Abadim
- Alvite
- Arco de Baúlhe
- Basto
- Bucos
- Cabeceiras de Basto
- Cavez
- Faia
- Gondiães
- Outeiro
- Painzela
- Passos
- Pedraça
- Refojos de Basto
- Rio Douro
- Vila Nune
- Vilar de Cunhas

== Cadaval ==
- Alguber
- Cadaval
- Cercal
- Figueiros
- Lamas
- Painho
- Peral
- Pêro Moniz
- Vermelha
- Vilar

== Caldas da Rainha ==
=== Until 28 January 2013 ===
- A-dos-Francos
- Alvorninha
- Caldas da Rainha — Nossa Senhora do Pópulo
- Caldas da Rainha — Santo Onofre
- Carvalhal Benfeito
- Coto
- Foz do Arelho
- Landal
- Nadadouro
- Salir de Matos
- Salir do Porto
- Santa Catarina
- São Gregório
- Serra do Bouro
- Tornada
- Vidais

=== Effective 29 January 2013 ===
- A dos Francos
- Alvorninha
- União das Freguesias de Caldas da Rainha — Nossa Senhora do Pópulo, Coto e São Gregório
- União das Freguesias de Caldas da Rainha — Santo Onofre e Serra do Bouro
- Carvalhal Benfeito
- Foz do Arelho
- Landal
- Nadadouro
- Salir de Matos
- Santa Catarina
- União das Freguesias de Tornada e Salir do Porto
- Vidais

== Calheta (Azores) ==
- Calheta
- Norte Pequeno
- Ribeira Seca
- Santo Antão
- Topo

== Calheta (Madeira) ==
- Arco da Calheta
- Calheta
- Estreito da Calheta
- Fajã da Ovelha
- Jardim do Mar
- Paul do Mar
- Ponta do Pargo
- Prazeres

== Câmara de (Madeira) ==
- Câmara de Lobos
- Curral das Freiras
- Estreito de Câmara de Lobos
- Jardim da Serra
- Quinta Grande

== Caminha ==
- Âncora
- Arga de Baixo
- Arga de Cima
- Arga de São João
- Argela
- Azevedo
- Caminha (Matriz)
- Cristelo
- Dem
- Gondar
- Lanhelas
- Moledo
- Orbacém
- Riba de Âncora
- Seixas
- Venade
- Vila Praia de Âncora
- Vilar de Mouros
- Vilarelho
- Vile

== Campo Maior ==
- Nossa Senhora da Expectação
- Nossa Senhora da Graça dos Degolados
- São João Baptista

== Cantanhede ==
- Ançã
- Bolho
- Cadima
- Camarneira
- Cantanhede
- Cordinhã
- Corticeiro de Cima
- Covões
- Febres
- Murtede
- Ourentã
- Outil
- Pocariça
- Portunhos
- Sanguinheira
- São Caetano
- Sepins
- Tocha
- Vilamar

== Carrazeda de Ansiães ==
- Amedo
- Beira Grande
- Belver
- Carrazeda de Ansiães
- Castanheiro
- Fonte Longa
- Lavandeira
- Linhares
- Marzagão
- Mogo de Malta
- Parambos
- Pereiros
- Pinhal do Norte
- Pombal
- Ribalonga
- Seixo de Ansiães
- Selores
- Vilarinho da Castanheira
- Zedes

== Carregal do Sal ==
- Beijós
- Cabanas de Viriato
- Currelos
- Oliveira do Conde
- Papízios
- Parada
- Sobral

== Cartaxo ==
- Cartaxo
- Ereira
- Lapa
- Pontével
- Valada
- Vale da Pedra
- Vale da Pinta
- Vila Chã de Ourique

== Cascais ==
- Alcabideche
- Carcavelos
- Cascais
- Estoril
- Parede
- São Domingos de Rana

== Castanheira de Pêra ==
- Castanheira de Pêra
- Coentral

== Castelo Branco ==
- Alcains
- Almaceda
- Benquerenças
- Cafede
- Castelo Branco
- Cebolais de Cima
- Escalos de Baixo
- Escalos de Cima
- Freixial do Campo
- Juncal do Campo
- Lardosa
- Louriçal do Campo
- Lousa
- Malpica do Tejo
- Mata
- Monforte da Beira
- Ninho do Açor
- Póvoa de Rio de Moinhos
- Retaxo
- Salgueiro do Campo
- Santo André das Tojeiras
- São Vicente da Beira
- Sarzedas
- Sobral do Campo
- Tinalhas

== Castelo de Paiva ==
- Bairros
- Fornos
- Paraíso
- Pedorido
- Raiva
- Real
- Santa Maria de Sardoura
- São Martinho de Sardoura
- Sobrado

== Castelo de Vide ==
- Nossa Senhora da Graça de Póvoa e Meada
- Santa Maria da Devesa
- Santiago Maior
- São João Baptista

== Castro Daire ==
- Almofala
- Alva
- Cabril
- Castro Daire
- Cujó
- Ermida
- Ester
- Gafanhão
- Gosende
- Mamouros
- Mezio
- Mões
- Moledo
- Monteiras
- Moura Morta
- Parada de Ester
- Pepim
- Picão
- Pinheiro
- Reriz
- Ribolhos
- São Joaninho

== Castro Marim ==
- Altura
- Azinhal
- Castro Marim (freguesias)
- Odeleite

== Castro Verde ==
- Casével
- Castro Verde
- Entradas
- Santa Bárbara de Padrões
- São Marcos da Ataboeira

== Celorico da Beira ==
- Açores
- Baraçal
- Cadafaz
- Carrapichana
- Casas do Soeiro
- Celorico (Santa Maria)
- Celorico (São Pedro)
- Cortiçô da Serra
- Forno Telheiro
- Lajeosa do Mondego
- Linhares
- Maçal do Chão
- Mesquitela
- Minhocal
- Prados
- Rapa
- Ratoeira
- Salgueirais
- Vale de Azares
- Velosa
- Vide entre Vinhas
- Vila Boa do Mondego

== Celorico de Basto ==
- Agilde
- Arnóia
- Basto (Santa Tecla)
- Basto (São Clemente)
- Borba de Montanha
- Britelo
- Caçarilhe
- Canedo de Basto
- Carvalho
- Codeçoso
- Corgo
- Fervença
- Gagos
- Gémeos
- Infesta
- Molares
- Moreira do Castelo
- Ourilhe
- Rego
- Ribas
- Vale de Bouro
- Veade

== Chamusca ==
- Carregueira
- Chamusca
- Chouto
- Parreira
- Pinheiro Grande
- Ulme
- Vale de Cavalos

== Chaves ==
- Águas Frias
- Anelhe
- Arcossó
- Bobadela
- Bustelo
- Calvão
- Cela
- Cimo de Vila da Castanheira
- Curalha
- Eiras
- Ervededo
- Faiões
- Lama de Arcos
- Loivos
- Madalena
- Mairos
- Moreiras
- Nogueira da Montanha
- Oucidres
- Oura
- Outeiro Seco
- Paradela
- Póvoa de Agrações
- Redondelo
- Roriz
- Samaiões
- Sanfins
- Sanjurge
- Santa Cruz/Trindade
- Santa Leocádia
- Santa Maria Maior
- Santo António de Monforte
- Santo Estêvão
- São Julião de Montenegro
- São Pedro de Agostém
- São Vicente
- Seara Velha
- Selhariz
- Soutelinho da Raia
- Soutelo
- Travancas
- Tronco
- Vale de Anta
- Vidago
- Vila Verde da Raia
- Vilar de Nantes
- Vilarelho da Raia
- Vilarinho das Paranheiras
- Vilas Boas
- Vilela do Tâmega
- Vilela Seca

== Cinfães ==
- Alhões
- Bustelo
- Cinfães
- Espadanedo
- Ferreiros de Tendais
- Fornelos (Cinfães)
- Gralheira
- Moimenta
- Nespereira
- Oliveira do Douro
- Ramires
- Santiago de Piães
- São Cristóvão de Nogueira
- Souselo
- Tarouquela
- Tendais
- Travanca

== Coimbra ==
=== Until 28 January 2013 ===
- Almalaguês
- Almedina
- Ameal
- Antanhol
- Antuzede
- Arzila
- Assafarge
- Botão
- Brasfemes
- Castelo Viegas
- Ceira
- Cernache
- Eiras
- Lamarosa
- Ribeira de Frades
- Santa Clara
- Santa Cruz
- Santo António dos Olivais
- São Bartolomeu
- São João do Campo
- São Martinho de Árvore
- São Martinho do Bispo
- São Paulo de Frades
- São Silvestre
- Sé Nova
- Souselas
- Taveiro
- Torre de Vilela
- Torres do Mondego
- Trouxemil
- Vil de Matos

=== Effective 29 January 2013 ===
- Almalaguês
- Antuzede e Vil de Matos
- Assafarge e Antanhol
- Brasfemes
- Ceira
- Cernache
- Coimbra (Sé Nova, Santa Cruz, Almedina e São Bartolomeu)
- Eiras e São Paulo de Frades
- Santa Clara e Castelo Viegas
- Santo António dos Olivais
- São João do Campo
- São Martinho de Árvore e Lamarosa
- São Martinho do Bispo e Ribeira de Frades
- São Silvestre
- Souselas e Botão
- Taveiro, Ameal e Arzila
- Torres do Mondego
- Trouxemil e Torre de Vilela

== Condeixa-a-Nova ==
- Anobra
- Belide
- Bem da Fé
- Condeixa-a-Nova
- Condeixa-a-Velha
- Ega
- Furadouro
- Sebal
- Vila Seca
- Zambujal

== Constância ==
- Constância
- Montalvo
- Santa Margarida da Coutada

== Coruche ==
- Biscainho
- Branca
- Coruche
- Couço
- Erra
- Fajarda
- Santana do Mato
- São José da Lamarosa

== Corvo (Azores) ==
- Vila do Corvo

== Covilhã ==
- Aldeia de São Francisco de Assis
- Aldeia do Souto
- Barco
- Boidobra
- Canhoso
- Cantar-Galo
- Casegas
- Cortes do Meio
- Coutada
- Covilhã (Conceição)
- Covilhã (Santa Maria)
- Covilhã (São Martinho)
- Covilhã (São Pedro)
- Dominguizo
- Erada
- Ferro
- Orjais
- Ourondo
- Paul
- Peraboa
- Peso
- São Jorge da Beira
- Sarzedo
- Sobral de São Miguel
- Teixoso
- Tortosendo
- Unhais da Serra
- Vale Formoso
- Vales do Rio
- Verdelhos
- Vila do Carvalho

== Crato ==
- Aldeia da Mata
- Crato e Mártires
- Flor da Rosa
- Gáfete
- Monte da Pedra
- Vale do Peso

== Cuba ==
- Cuba
- Faro do Alentejo
- Vila Alva
- Vila Ruiva
