= Antanhol =

- Civil parish
- Location in Portugal
- Coordinates: 40°10′18″N 8°28′52″W
- Country: Portugal
- Region: Centro
- Intermunic. comm.: Região de Coimbra
- District: Coimbra
- Municipality: Coimbra
- Disbanded: 28 January 2013

Area
  - Total: 10.49 km^{2} (4.05 sq mi)

Population (2011)
  - Total: 2,556
  - Density: 240/km^{2} (630/sq mi)
- Time zone: UTC+00:00 (WET)
  - Summer (DST): UTC+01:00 (WEST)

Antanhol is a former civil parish in the municipality of Coimbra, Portugal. The population in 2011 was 2,556, in an area of 10.49 km^{2}. On 28 January 2013 it merged with Assafarge to form Assafarge e Antanhol.

Population of the civil parish of Antanhol (1864–2011)
Year	Pop.	±%
1864	513	—
1878	626	+22.0%
1890	638	+1.9%
1900	712	+11.6%
1911	840	+18.0%
1920	782	−6.9%
1930	915	+17.0%
1940	1,021	+11.6%
1950	1,176	+15.2%
1960	1,317	+12.0%
1970	1,369	+3.9%
1981	1,831	+33.7%
1991	2,127	+16.2%
2001	2,447	+15.0%
2011	2,556	+4.5%
