= César Brito =

Portuguese footballer

Personal information
- Full name: César Gonçalves de Brito Duarte
- Date of birth: 21 October 1964 (age 62)
- Place of birth: Barco, Portugal
- Height: 1.76 m (5 ft 9 in)
- Position: Striker

Youth career
- 1977–1978: Fundão
- 1978–1983: Barco

Senior career*
Years	Team	Apps	(Gls)
1983–1985	Covilhã	?	(15)
1985–1995	Benfica	100	(21)
1987–1989	→ Portimonense (loan)	50	(13)
1995–1996	Belenenses	25	(9)
1996–1998	Salamanca	70	(22)
1998–1999	Mérida	14	(1)
1999–2000	Covilhã	1	(0)
Total		260+	(81)

International career
1989–1993	Portugal	14	(2)
- * Club domestic league appearances and goals

César Gonçalves de Brito Duarte (born 21 October 1964), known as Brito, is a Portuguese former professional footballer who played as a striker.

== Club career ==
Born in the village of Barco, Brito started playing for local S.C. Covilhã, but soon attracted attention from S.L. Benfica, who signed him in 1985. He endured a difficult start at the latter, going on to serve a two-year loan at fellow Primeira Liga side Portimonense SC.

Upon his return, Brito appeared mainly from the bench, barred by Swede Mats Magnusson. His biggest moment at Benfica arrived during the 1990–91 season, as he scored twice – as a substitute – to beat FC Porto away (2–0) and eventually clinch the national title, in a match that ended in a riot.

Brito ended his ten-year link at the Estádio da Luz in summer 1995, having totalled only 23 league games in his last three seasons. After a good year at Lisbon neighbours C.F. Belenenses he moved to Spain, teaming up with a host of compatriots at UD Salamanca, including Pauleta. In his debut campaign, already aged 32, he netted 15 goals in the Segunda División, helping the team to promote to La Liga while combining with Pauleta for 34 (the pair finished joint-first and fourth in the scoring charts).

In 1997–98, Brito featured regularly as Salamanca managed to stay in the top flight, then joined modest CP Mérida in the second tier. He saw out his career at his first club, retiring at 35.

== International career ==
Brito earned 14 caps for Portugal in four years, and scored twice.

César Brito: International goals
No.	Date	Venue	Opponent	Score	Result	Competition
1	11 September 1991	Estádio das Antas, Porto, Portugal	Finland	1–0	1–0	Euro 1992 qualifying
2	12 February 1992	Estádio de São Luís, Faro, Portugal	Netherlands	2–0	2–0	Friendly

== Honours ==
Benfica

- Primeira Liga: 1986–87, 1988–89, 1990–91, 1993–94
