= Rui Miguel =

Rui Miguel may refer to:

- Rui Miguel (footballer, born 1983), Portuguese footballer who plays as a midfielder
- Rui Miguel (footballer, born 1984), Portuguese footballer who plays as a forward
