= Bustelo =

Bustelo may refer to:

- Café Bustelo, a coffee brand owned by The J.M. Smucker Company
- SC Bustelo, a Portuguese football club
- "Bustelo", a song by Ratatat from their 2004 album Ratatat

== Places ==
- Bustelo (Amarante), a civil parish of Amarante Municipality, Portugal
- Bustelo (Chaves), a civil parish of Chaves Municipality, Portugal
- Bustelo (Cinfães), a civil parish of Cinfães Municipality, Portugal
- Bustelo (Penafiel), a civil parish of Penafiel Municipality, Portugal

== People ==
- Carlos Bustelo (born 1936), Spanish Minister of Industry from 1979 to 1980
- Carlota Bustelo (1939–2025), Spanish politician, and feminist
- Gabriela Bustelo (born 1962), Spanish author, journalist, and translator
- Manuel Barreiro Bustelo (born 1986), Spanish footballer
