= Torre de Vilela =

- Civil parish
- Location in Portugal
- Coordinates: 40°16′4″N 8°26′2″W
- Country: Portugal
- Region: Centro
- Intermunic. comm.: Região de Coimbra
- District: Coimbra
- Municipality: Coimbra
- Established: 1876
- Disbanded: 28 January 2013

Area
  - Total: 4.44 km^{2} (1.71 sq mi)

Population (2011)
  - Total: 1,242
  - Density: 280/km^{2} (720/sq mi)
- Time zone: UTC+00:00 (WET)
  - Summer (DST): UTC+01:00 (WEST)

Torre de Vilela is a former civil parish in the municipality of Coimbra, Portugal. The population in 2011 was 1,242, in an area of 4.44 km^{2}. It was annexed to Brasfemes until 1876, at which point it became an independent freguesia. On 28 January 2013 it merged with Trouxemil to form Trouxemil e Torre de Vilela.

Population of the civil parish of Torre de Vilela (1890–2011)
Year	Pop.	±%
1890	356	—
1900	282	−20.8%
1911	350	+24.1%
1920	374	+6.9%
1930	440	+17.6%
1940	478	+8.6%
1950	505	+5.6%
1960	579	+14.7%
1970	687	+18.7%
1981	906	+31.9%
1991	1,085	+19.8%
2001	1,146	+5.6%
2011	1,242	+8.4%
