= Litocar =

Litocar SGPS
- Company type: Sociedade Anonymous
- Founded: 1982
- Headquarters: Coimbra, Portugal,
- Key people: João Cardoso, CEO; Gonçalo Cardoso, CFO; Mário Cardoso, Chairman
- Products: Automobiles
- Website: http://www.litocar.pt;

Grupo Litocar is an automobile retailer in the centre of Portugal. It was founded in 1982 in Figueira da Foz and is a family-owned business. Through its subsidiaries, it is an official retailer of Renault, Volvo, Dacia, Nissan, Honda, Mitsubishi, Opel, Hyundai, Mazda, Fiat and Abarth for most of the Centro Region of the country. It also markets its own brand of used autos, Ncar. Its headquarters are located in Coimbra, near the village of Cernache.
