= Serra do Bouro =

- Civil parish
- Location in Portugal
- Coordinates: 39.449°N 9.176°W
- Country: Portugal
- Region: Oeste e Vale do Tejo
- Intermunic. comm.: Oeste
- District: Leiria
- Municipality: Caldas da Rainha
- Disbanded: 2013

Area
  - Total: 18.21 km^{2} (7.03 sq mi)

Population (2011)
  - Total: 703
  - Density: 38.6/km^{2} (100/sq mi)
- Time zone: UTC+00:00 (WET)
  - Summer (DST): UTC+01:00 (WEST)

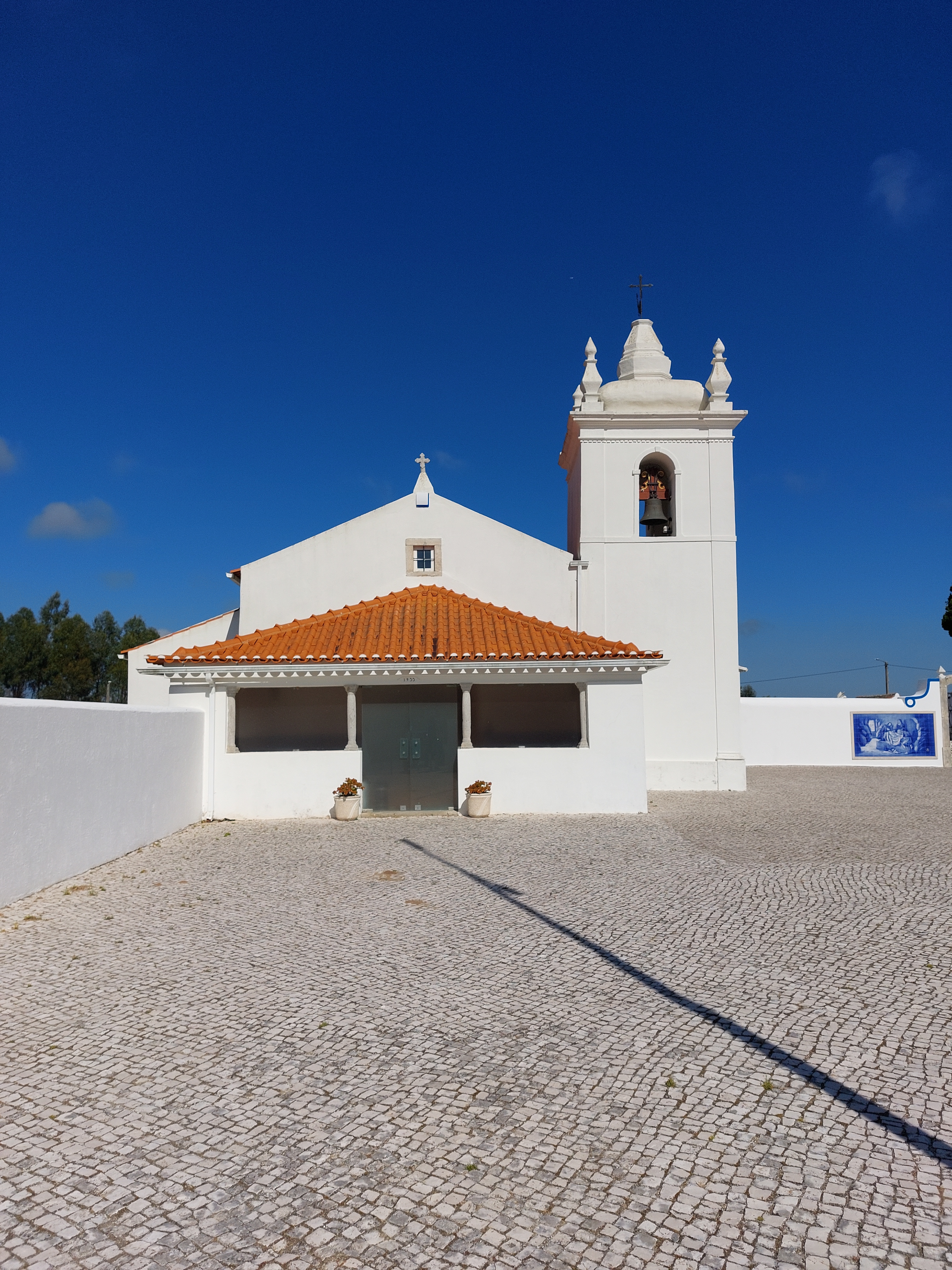
Serra do Bouro parish church

Serra do Bouro is a former civil parish in the municipality of Caldas da Rainha, Portugal. In 2013, the parish merged into the new parish Caldas da Rainha — Santo Onofre e Serra do Bouro. The civil parish had an area of 18.21 square kilometres (7.03 sq mi) and had a population of 703 at the 2011 census. It the least populous freguesia of the municipality.

Localities (lugares) within Serra do Bouro include Cidade, Cabeço da Vela, Casais Antunes, Casais da Boavista, Casais da Cidade, Casais da Espinheira, Casal do Celão, Espinheira, Granja, Zambujeiro. Serra do Bouro has cliffs overlooking the Atlantic Ocean.

Principal activities of the inhabitants include agriculture and civil construction.

Serra do Bouro once belonged to the municipality of Óbidos, but the freguesia was transferred to Caldas da Rainha as this latter municipality developed economically. Two other freguesias of Caldas da Rainha were once part of Serra do Bouro, but were elevated to the status of freguesia themselves: Foz do Arelho in 1919 and Nadadouro in 1957.

== History ==
The area of Serra, as the locals know it, was first inhabited by the Veiga family in the 16th century. This freguesia changed little throughout much time. Electricity and municipal water reached Serra in the 1980s.

Throughout the 1900s most of the area's inhabitants emigrated to other countries, particularly to the United States. One of the greatest concentrations of Serra do Bouro descendants is in the area of Perth Amboy, New Jersey (sister city to Caldas da Rainha).

Serra has a cemetery called the "Cemitério dos Ingleses" (English Cemetery) where remains of two children and 6 women are buried from the October 28, 1892 shipwreck of the S.S. Roumania, an English ship.
