= Ançã (Cantanhede) =

- Civil parish
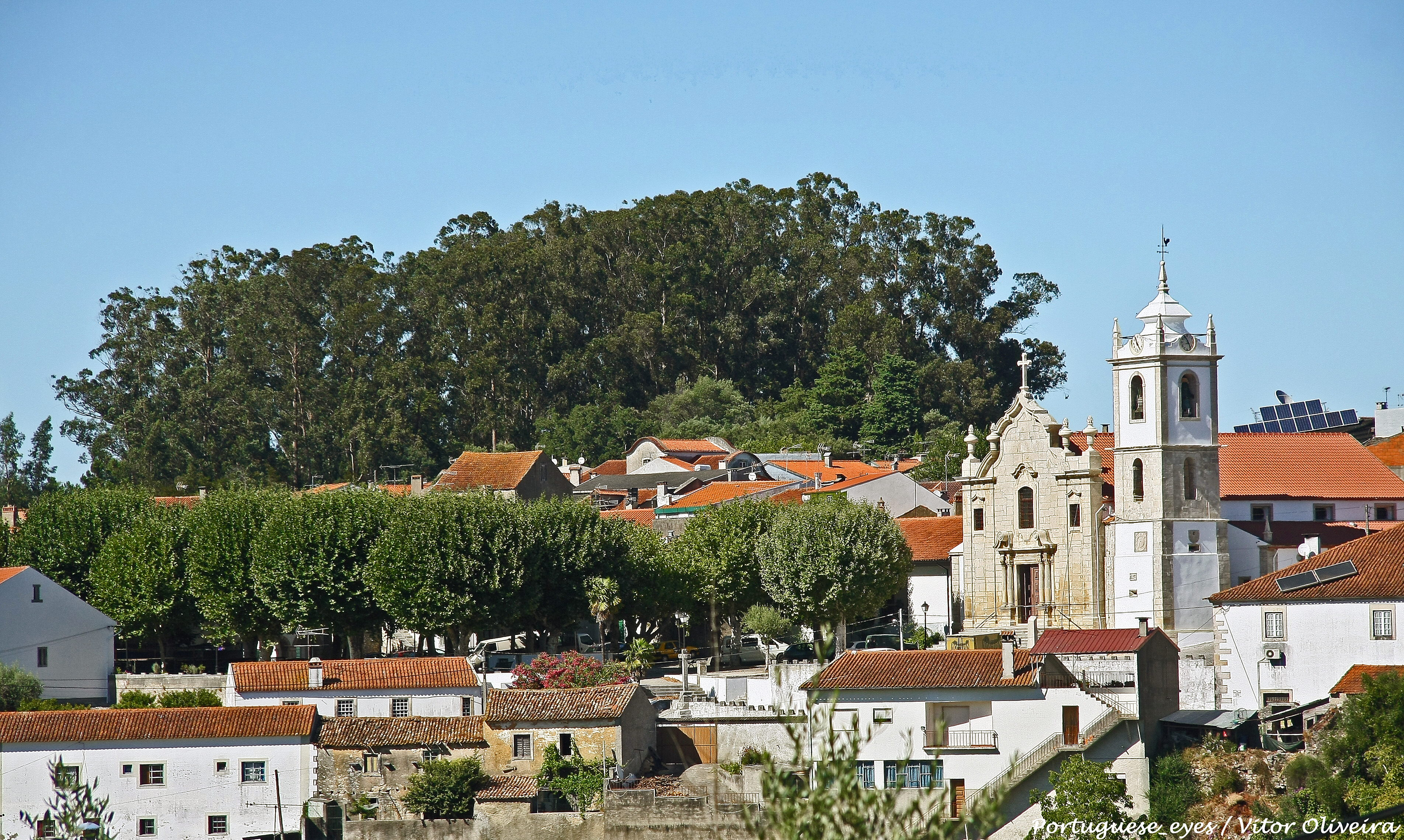

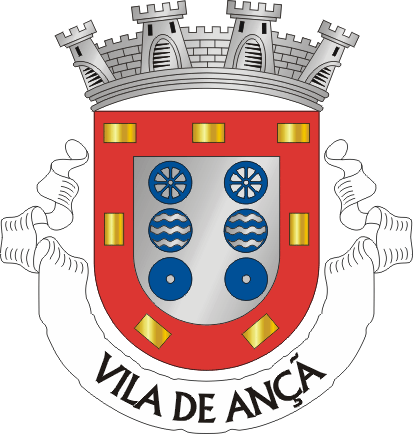
- Coat of arms

- Location in Portugal
- Coordinates: 40.273°N 8.522°W
- Country: Portugal
- Region: Centro
- Intermunic. comm.: Região de Coimbra
- District: Coimbra
- Municipality: Cantanhede

Area
  - Total: 18.10 km^{2} (6.99 sq mi)

Population (2011)
  - Total: 2,625
  - Density: 145.0/km^{2} (375.6/sq mi)
- Time zone: UTC+00:00 (WET)
  - Summer (DST): UTC+01:00 (WEST)
- Postal code: 3060
- Patron: Expectation of the Blessed Virgin Mary

Ançã is a Portuguese village and parish in the municipality of Cantanhede, with an area of 18.1 km^{2} and 2,625 inhabitants (2011). It has a population density of 145 inhabitants / km^{2}. It integrates in the district of Coimbra, being located approximately 10 km from the district capital. Historically and culturally, Vila de Ançã is linked to Baixo Mondego and not to Gândara or Bairrada, ethnographic regions that comprise the municipality of Cantanhede. Only Ançã wine can be considered, due to its characteristics, as part of the Bairrada wine region.

The well-preserved historic center of Ançã forms an architectural ensemble of significant value, built in the style associated with the Marquis of Cascais, lord of Vila de Ançã. The area has become increasingly popular, particularly for its restaurants and nightlife. In addition to the local Bolo de Ançã, the region is known for gastronomic specialties such as Leitão à Bairrada, Chanfana, and its wine production.

Jaime Cortesão's birthplace, which he still honors today with the name of one of its main streets and a monument with his bust. It is also the birthplace of the writer Augusto Abelaira.

The Fonte de Ançã or Fonte dos Castros is known for being a rare spectacle, with a flow rate exceeding 20,000 liters per minute, origin of stories and legends. The spring water feeds the Natural Pool of Ançã, whose water is constantly flowing. Even more famous is the Pedra de Ançã, present in important monuments, such as the Monastery of Batalha, which attracted great sculptors to Coimbra.

Outside the village, Ançã is also composed of the localities of Granja, Ameixoeira and Gândara.

== Etymology ==
The name of Ançã is of Latin origin. According to the archaeologist Jorge de Alarcão (In territorio Colimbrie: old places (and some of them dismembered) from Mondego, 2004), it will probably come from Antiana, the name given to the village of a Roman man named Antius. With the breakdown of the Roman Empire the name will have changed to Anzana (as it appears in the oldest documents, from the 10th century), contracting later to Ançãa and, today, Ançã.

Another theory defended by many, the Italian origin through "abbondanza" (for the abundance of water), has no historical basis, being only supported by the legend of the 18th century that, according to which, the creation of the village was due to 8 Benedictines monks from Italy.

== History ==
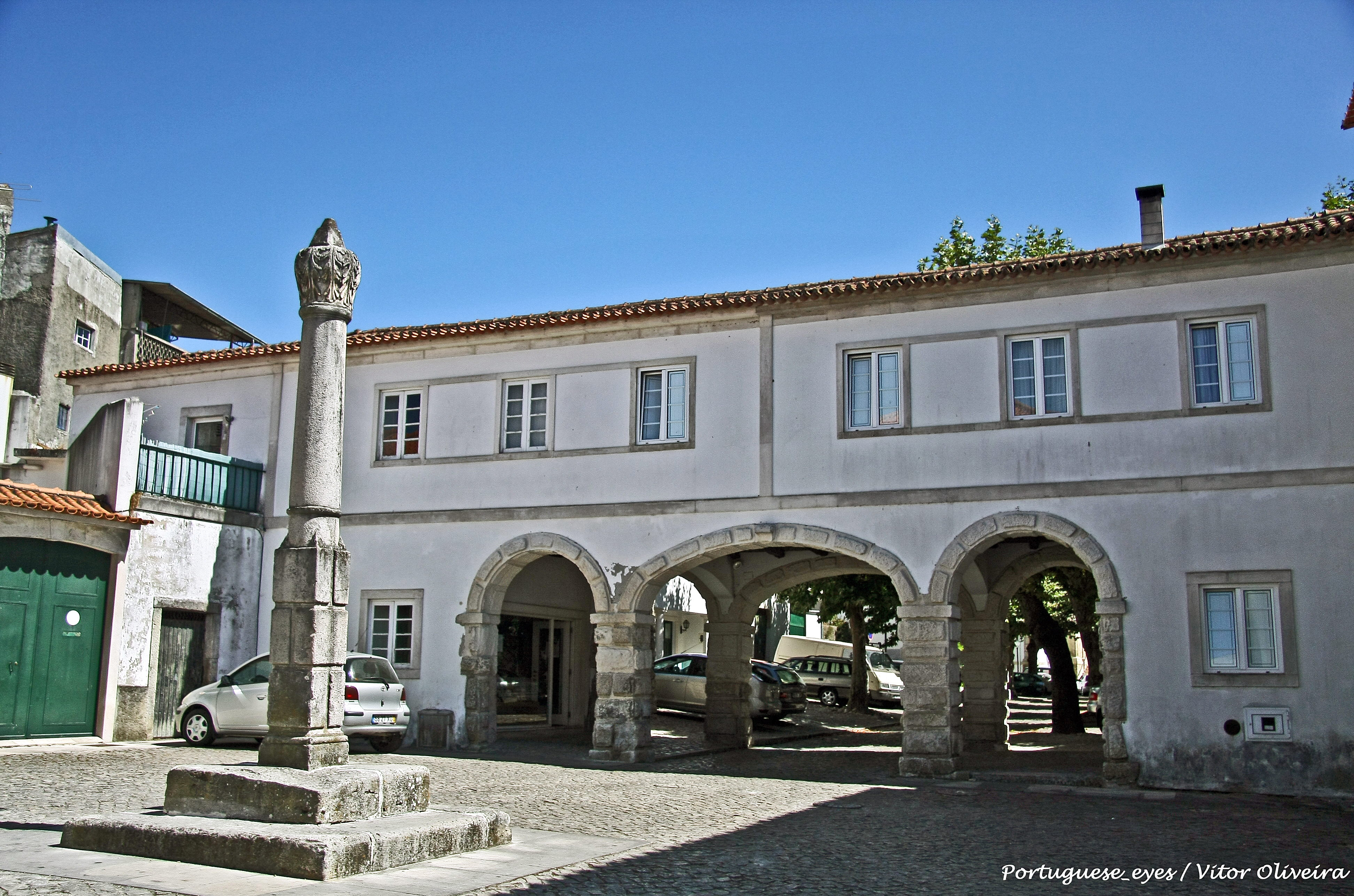
Pelourinho de Ançã

Initially, Ançã was a town integrated in the territory of Coimbra. In 937, a document states that it would be a village regained by Christians. However, it was at the end of the Middle Ages, in 1371, when Fernando I of Portugal elevated Ançã to the category of village, and created the Municipality of Ançã, acquiring autonomy and granting privileges, enumerating the perks and demarcating the extent of its territory, which included the villages of Ançã, Pena, Vale de Água, Barcouço, Portunhos, S. João do Campo, Cioga do Campo and Rios Frios. It should be noted, however, that D. Fernando does not grant him any charter, with the town being governed by the charter of Coimbra until the granting of a new charter, during the reign of Manuel I, on 28 June 1514.

It is around the 17th century that the Marquis of Cascais builds the important architectural heritage that still characterizes the historic center today, such as the construction of its palace and the roof of its famous fountain (dated 1674).

In the 19th century, the municipality of Ançã was constituted by the parishes of Barcouço, Ançã, Portunhos, Pena, Cioga do Campo, Vil de Matos, São Facundo and Cidreira, reaching 4275 inhabitants in 1801. Soon after the French Invasions, administrative reforms were initiated at the beginning of Liberalism. Having a small stronghold of absolutists, the result of the landlord of the village having been under the responsibility of Queen Carlota Joaquina (mother of Miguel and well-known for her son's ideas), Ançã came to lose the county seat on 31 December 1853, the village being attached to the municipality of Cantanhede, where it still remains. However, it is also in this century that travelers begin to stop, in this region, to eat the famous Leitão à Bairrada and drink their famous wines. At the end of this century, Jaime Cortesão was born in Ançã (in 1884).

Due to the rural exodus and emigration, in the 1960s, there was a noticeable decrease in population, and a sharp slowdown in the development of Ançã.

In 2001, it was raised to the category of village, by Law No. 43/2001 of 12 July. The beginning of this century is marked by the requalification of urban space and by environmental awareness, factors that value and dynamize the place, attracting investments. If the municipality of Ançã had not been extinguished, it would have today a territorial area of 80.34 km^{2} and a total population of 11 183 inhabitants. Its population density would be 139 inhabitants / km².

In 2024, the limestone of Ançã was recognised as a World Heritage Stone.

== Cultural heritage ==
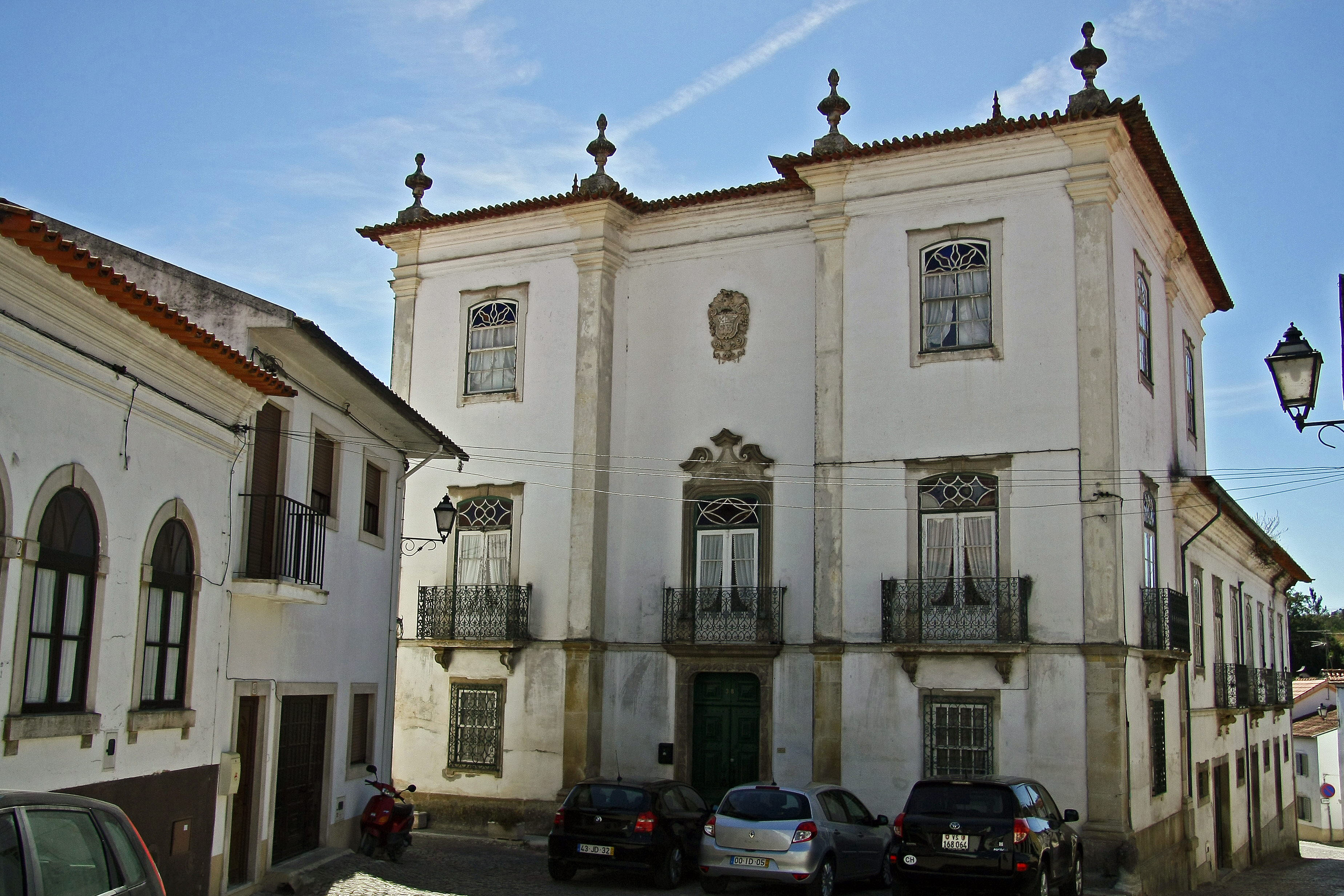
Solar dos Neiva

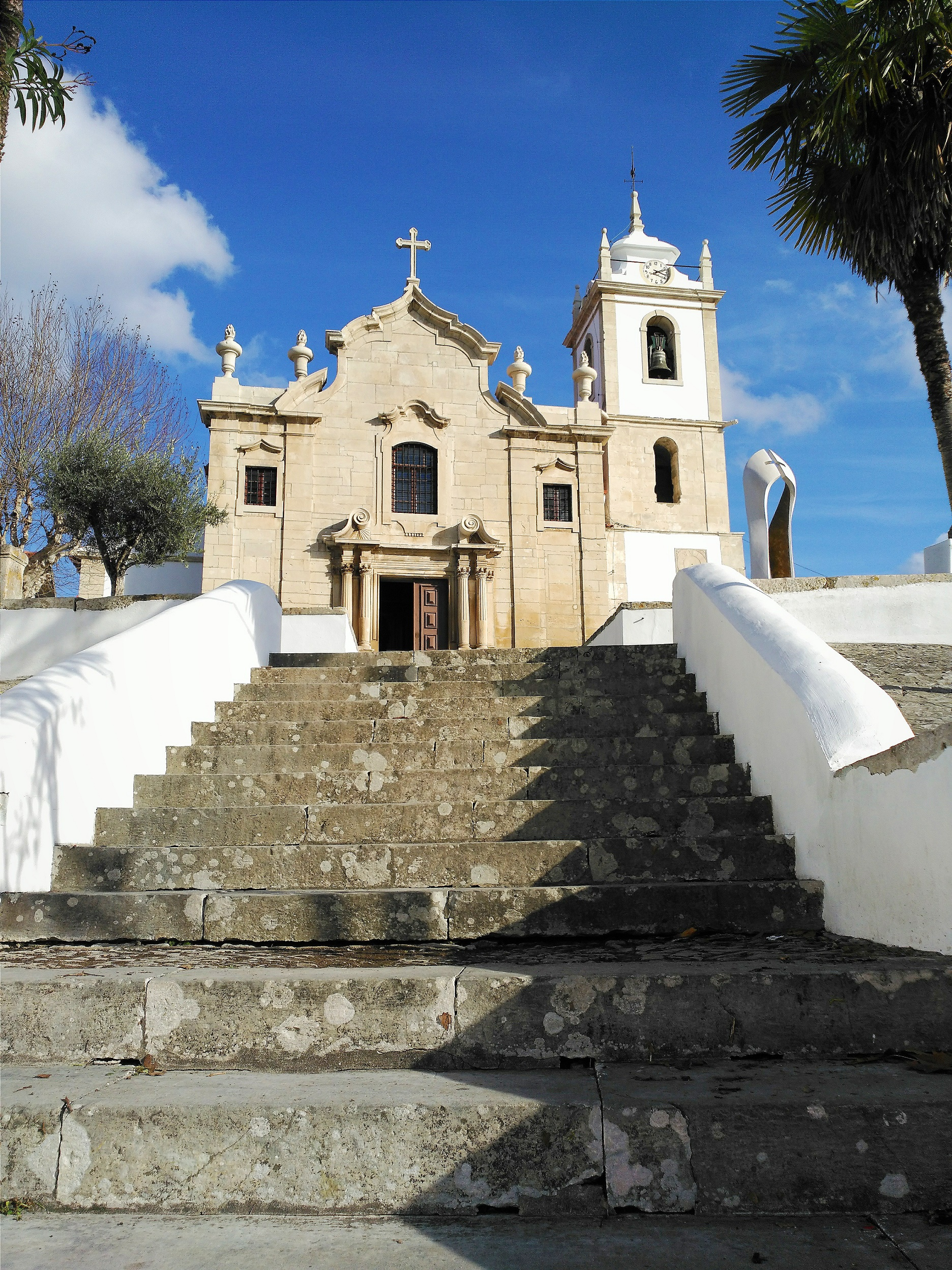
Ança's Church

- Igreja Paroquial de Ançã ou Igreja de Nossa Senhora do Ó
- Capela de São Bento
- Capela de São Sebastião (Ançã)
- Capela do Espírito Santo (Ançã)
- Núcleo urbano de Ançã e ponte
- Pelourinho de Ançã
- Portal Setecentista
- Moinho da Fonte
- Moinho Valfavas
- Moinho do Farinha de Milho
- Piscina Natural de Ançã
- Fonte de Ançã
- Palácio do Marquês de Cascais
- Antigo Solar dos Neiva
- Museu Etnográfico de Ançã

== Population ==
Population of the parish of Ançã
1864	1878	1890	1900	1911	1920	1930	1940	1950	1960	1970	1981	1991	2001	2011
1 484	1 755	1 804	1 855	2 102	2 236	2 445	2 442	2 566	2 608	2 378	2 507	2 387	2 579	2 625

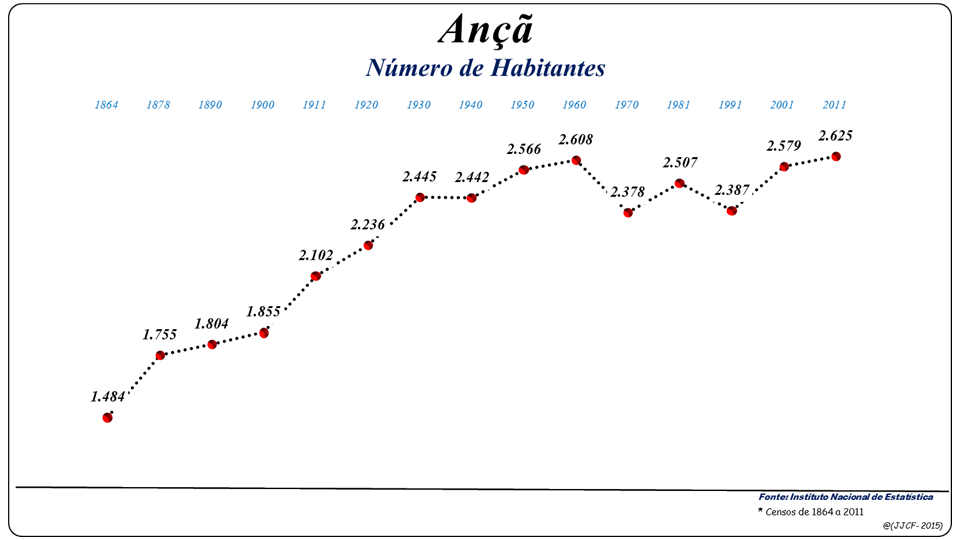
Evolution of the population

== Culture ==
=== Museums and galleries ===
- Museu Etnográfico de Ançã

The Museu Etnográfico de Ançã was inserted in a dwelling house, which was built in the late 17th and early 18th centuries. This has been used as a museum space, promoted by the village's ethnography and folklore group, the Grupo Típico de Ançã, since 1991. The museum recreates a typical Ançanense house, in which the family lived on the first floor and on the ground floor the animals were kept. Today, on the first floor of the museum, it is possible to see the recreation of a kitchen and bedroom from the 20th century. The lower floor is dedicated to the exhibition of agricultural implements, toys, ranch costumes and prizes obtained by the Grupo Típico de Ançã

- Quintal da Fonte Bar / Galery.

=== Parties and Pilgrimages ===
- Festa de São Sebastião (20 January)
- Festa e Aniversário de São Bento (3rd Monday after Easter)
- Festa e Romaria de de São Tomé (25 July)
- Festa do Sr. da Fonte (first weekend of September)
- Feira do Bolo de Ançã (end of March)

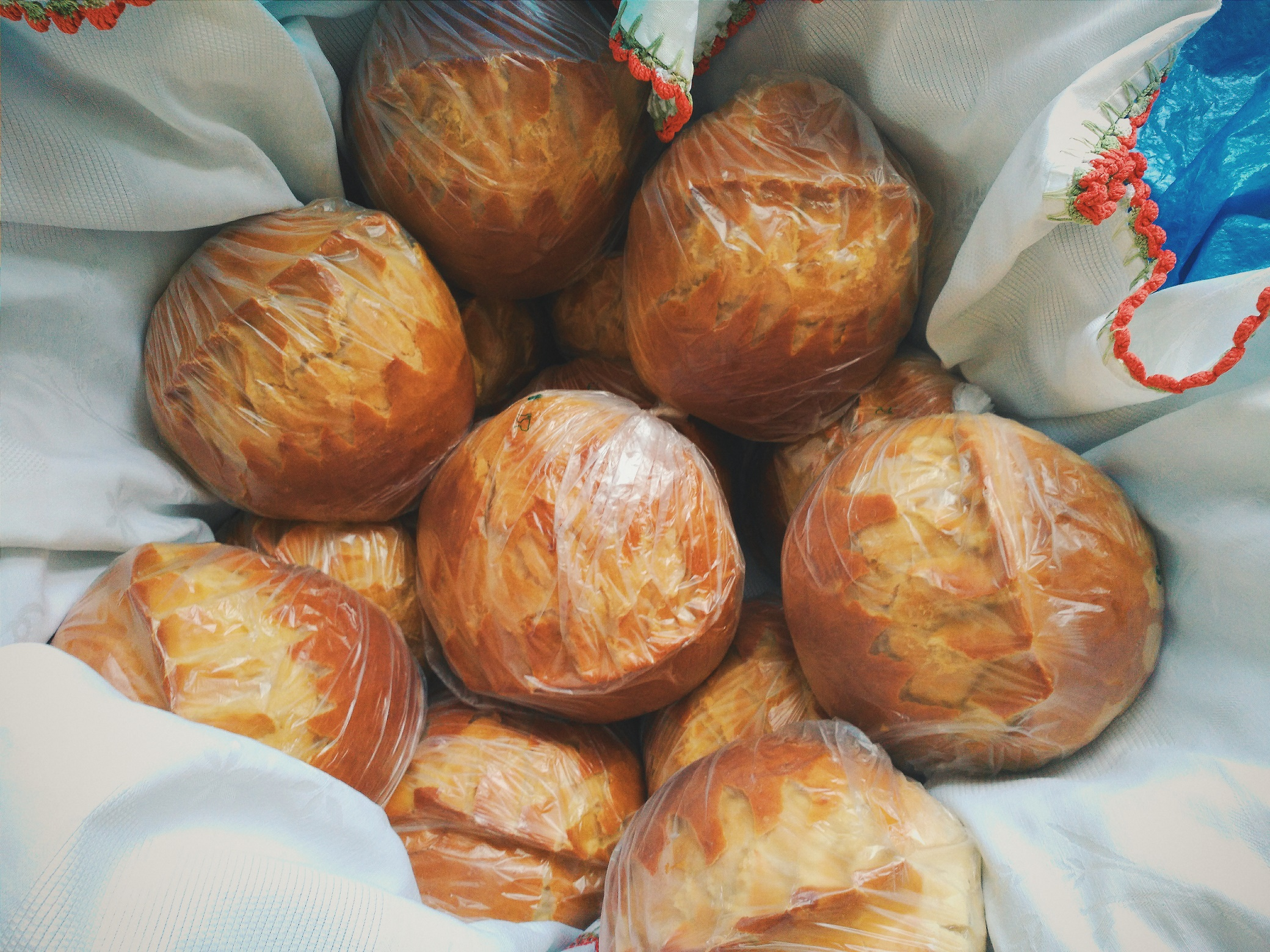
Bolo de Ançã

=== Gastronomy ===
==== Bolo de Ançã ====
The origin of Bolo de Ançã is lost in time and the secret of its preparation was passed on from parents to children - it does, however, date from the end of the 19th century / beginning of the 20th century.

It is a simple confection cake, with basic ingredients (eggs, wheat flour, sugar, butter, cinnamon and lemon), it is made through an artisanal manufacturing process - manually kneaded and baked in a wood oven - which reveals its true secret.

=== Sports ===
Ançã Futebol Clube develops its competitive and training activity at the Parque Desportivo de Ançã. There is also a Sports Pavilion where one of the best synthetic turf pitches in the region can be found.
