= La Cucharita Se Me Perdió =

Song that hit the charts in Colombia during the early 1980s

La Cucharita se me perdió is a song that hit the charts in Colombia during the early 1980s. The song is in the style of the traditional "carranguera" music native to the rural lands of central Colombia, a folk music genre analogous to the "bluegrass" music that is indigenous to the U.S.The song's creator, Jorge Velosa, is famous within the country for this and other songs that became popular among the Colombian people.

The song tells the story of a man who loses his beloved spoon and hopes his friend gives him a spoon that is the same. Properly, the song tells the story of a farmer who visits the large urban Capital, and is pick-pocketed losing among other things the spoon. As such, the song reflected the culture shock experienced by many Colombians of the time who transitioned massively from the countryside to the big cities.

The song was composed in 1979.
