= Ribeira de Frades =

- Civil parish
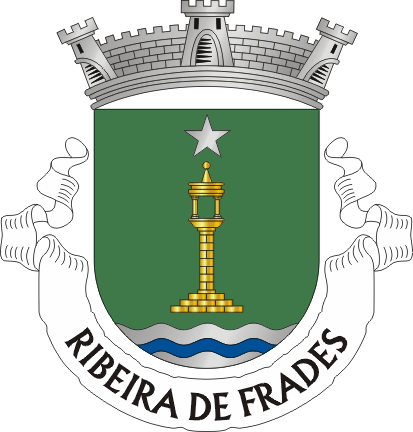
- Coat of arms

- Location in Portugal
- Coordinates: 40°11′59″N 8°29′34″W
- Country: Portugal
- Region: Centro
- Intermunic. comm.: Região de Coimbra
- District: Coimbra
- Municipality: Coimbra
- Disbanded: 28 January 2013

Area
  - Total: 6.10 km^{2} (2.36 sq mi)

Population (2011)
  - Total: 1,902
  - Density: 310/km^{2} (810/sq mi)
- Time zone: UTC+00:00 (WET)
  - Summer (DST): UTC+01:00 (WEST)

Ribeira de Frades is a former civil parish in the municipality of Coimbra, Portugal. The population in 2011 was 1,902, in an area of 6.10 km^{2}. On 28 January 2013 it merged with São Martinho do Bispo to form São Martinho do Bispo e Ribeira de Frades. It was one of the only freguesias with enclaves and exclaves. After the merging its enclave was maintained.

Population of the civil parish of Ribeira de Frades (1864–2011)
Year	Pop.	±%
1864	587	—
1878	632	+7.7%
1890	723	+14.4%
1900	667	−7.7%
1911	800	+19.9%
1920	803	+0.4%
1930	940	+17.1%
1940	1,124	+19.6%
1950	1,381	+22.9%
1960	1,683	+21.9%
1970	1,848	+9.8%
1981	2,068	+11.9%
1991	1,945	−5.9%
2001	2,064	+6.1%
2011	1,902	−7.8%

Previous borders of São Martinho do Bispo and Ribeira de Frades, with the enclave belonging to the freguesia Taveiro, Ameal e Arzila
