= Lagoa de Óbidos =

Lagoon in Oeste region, Portugal

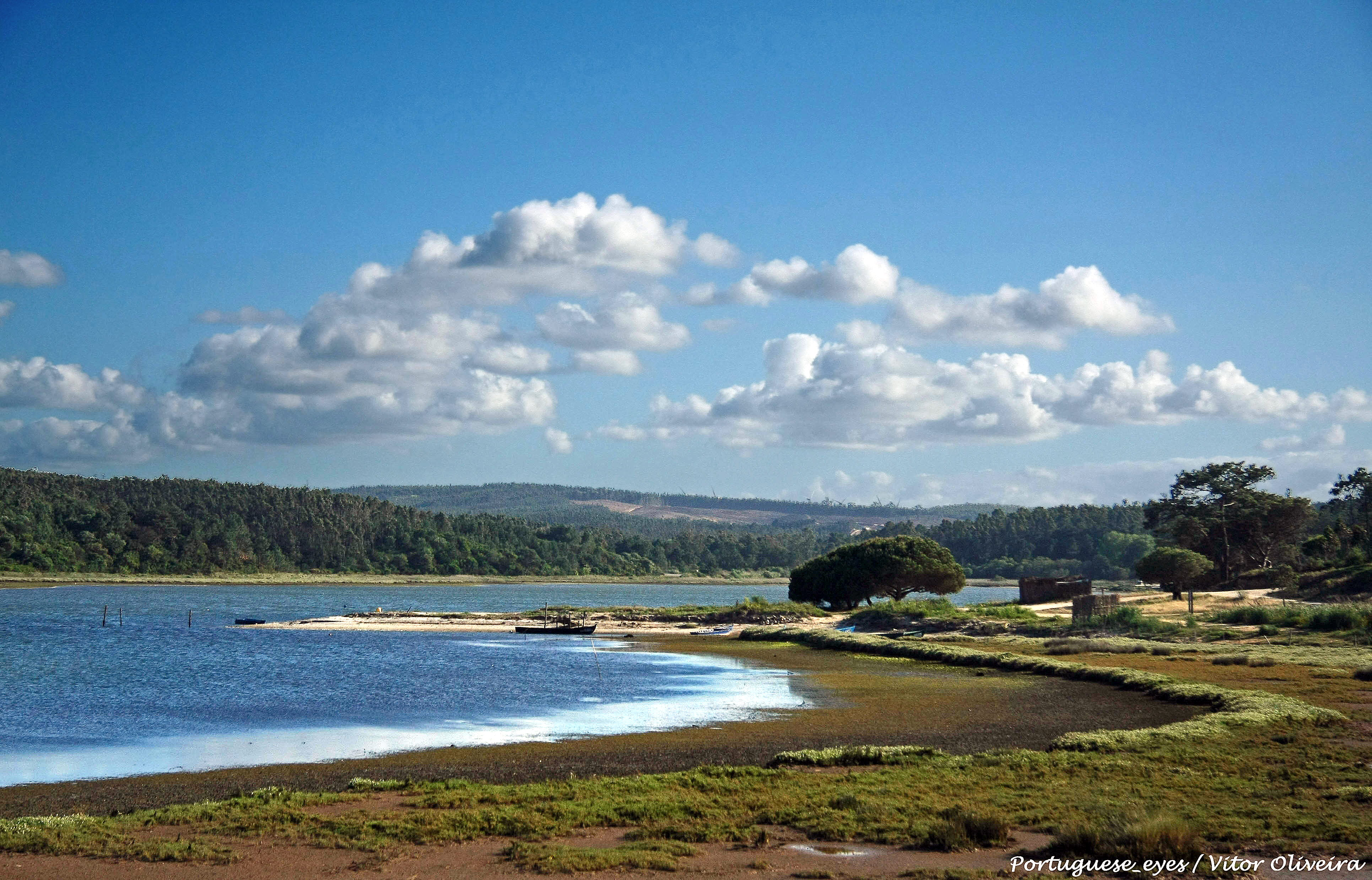

- Location within Portugal
- Location: Oeste region
- Coordinates: 39°25′N 9°13′W
- Type: lagoon
- Primary outflows: Atlantic Ocean
- Basin countries: Portugal
- Max. length: 6 kilometres (3.7 mi)
- Max. width: 1.5 kilometres (0.93 mi)
- Surface area: 6.9 square kilometres (2.7 mi^{2})
- Average depth: 2 metres (6.6 ft)
- Max. depth: 5 metres (16 ft)
- Sections/sub-basins: Braço do Bom Sucesso, Braço da Barrosa, Poça do Vau, Poça das Ferrarias
- Settlements: Óbidos, Caldas da Rainha, Vau (Óbidos), Foz do Arelho, Nadadouro

Ramsar Wetland
- Official name: Óbidos Lagoon
- Designated: 2 February 2025
- Reference no.: 2580

The Lagoa de Óbidos is the largest coastal lagoon system on the Portuguese coast. It has a total area of approximately 6.9 square kilometres (2.7 mi^{2}) and an average depth of 2 metres (6.6 ft), with depths ranging from 0.5 metres (1.6 ft) to 5 metres (16 ft). It is located in the Oeste region and it is bordered by the municipality of Caldas da Rainha to the north and by the municipality of Óbidos to the south.

The lagoon has a predominant NW-SW orientation, with a maximum length of 6 kilometres (3.7 mi) and a width that varies between 1 kilometre (0.62 mi) and 1.5 kilometres (0.93 mi). It extends inland through two main channels: the Braço do Bom Sucesso to the west and the Braço da Barrosa to the east. It is connected to two small lakes, Poça do Vau to the south and Poça das Ferrarias to the west.

The lagoon is largely responsible for the development of historic sites, such as Castle of Óbidos. It was designated as a protected Ramsar site in 2025.

== Ecosystem ==
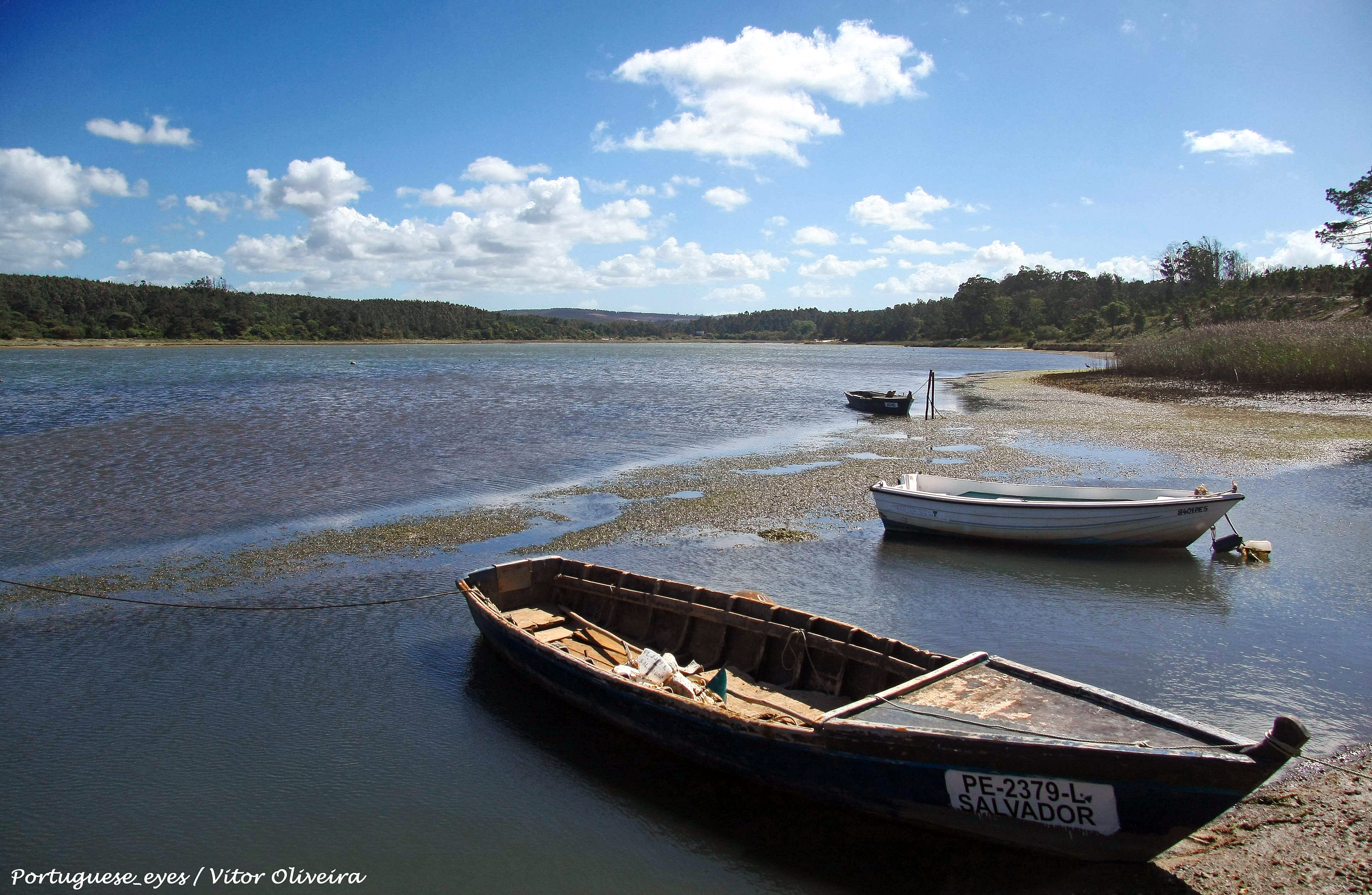
Fishing boats tied up at the lagoon

As a coastal lagoon system, the Lagoa de Óbidos holds high ecological value due to its productive characteristics, particularly in terms of ecosystem and species biodiversity. It is home to a variety of faunal and floral species and serves as an important habitat for birdlife, including migratory species that can be observed throughout the year.

The lagoon maintains a connection to the ocean through an artificially maintained tidal inlet, locally known as "Aberta," which facilitates the exchange of water and sediments between the lagoon and the ocean.

Of the entire lagoon area, the Braço da Barrosa is the most ecologically significant site. It is crucial for various biological groups and hosts one of the few remaining patches of forest within the lagoon. Additionally, it contains relatively well-preserved mudflat vegetation, which provides ideal conditions for birdlife and plays an important role for fish populations by offering suitable nursery habitats.
