= Ameal =

- Civil parish
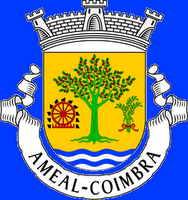
- Coat of arms

- Location in Portugal
- Coordinates: 40°11′25″N 8°32′37″W
- Country: Portugal
- Region: Centro
- Intermunic. comm.: Região de Coimbra
- District: Coimbra
- Municipality: Coimbra
- Disbanded: 28 January 2013

Area
  - Total: 11.25 km^{2} (4.34 sq mi)

Population (2011)
  - Total: 1,682
  - Density: 150/km^{2} (390/sq mi)
- Time zone: UTC+00:00 (WET)
  - Summer (DST): UTC+01:00 (WEST)
- Patron: James, brother of Jesus

Ameal is a former civil parish in the municipality of Coimbra, Portugal. The population in 2011 was 1,682, in an area of 11.25 km^{2}. On 28 January 2013 it merged with Taveiro and Arzila to form Taveiro, Ameal e Arzila.

Population of the civil parish of Ameal (1864–2011)
Year	Pop.	±%
1864	827	—
1878	905	+9.4%
1890	945	+4.4%
1900	963	+1.9%
1911	1,153	+19.7%
1920	1,084	−6.0%
1930	1,181	+8.9%
1940	1,406	+19.1%
1950	1,505	+7.0%
1960	1,635	+8.6%
1970	1,690	+3.4%
1981	1,722	+1.9%
1991	1,756	+2.0%
2001	1,678	−4.4%
2011	1,682	+0.2%

== See also ==
- Count of Ameal
