= Arzila (Coimbra) =

- Civil parish
- Location in Portugal
- Coordinates: 40°11′3″N 8°33′7″W
- Country: Portugal
- Region: Centro
- Intermunic. comm.: Região de Coimbra
- District: Coimbra
- Municipality: Coimbra
- Disbanded: 28 January 2013

Area
  - Total: 3.45 km^{2} (1.33 sq mi)

Population (2011)
  - Total: 655
  - Density: 190/km^{2} (492/sq mi)
- Time zone: UTC+00:00 (WET)
  - Summer (DST): UTC+01:00 (WEST)
- Patron: Immaculate Conception

Arzila is a former civil parish in the municipality of Coimbra, Portugal. The population in 2011 was 655, in an area of 3.45 km^{2}. On 28 January 2013 it merged with Taveiro and Ameal to form Taveiro, Ameal e Arzila. There is a Moroccan city with the same name, indicating its etymology is of Punic origin.

It is home to the Paul de Arzila, a natural reserve with a large number of species of birds among other animals. Its patron, the Immaculate Conception is celebrated annually on 8 December.

Population of the civil parish of Arzila (1864–2011)
Year	Pop.	±%
1864	308	—
1878	328	+6.5%
1890	395	+20.4%
1900	476	+20.5%
1911	528	+10.9%
1920	544	+3.0%
1930	578	+6.2%
1940	617	+6.7%
1950	663	+7.5%
1960	653	−1.5%
1970	706	+8.1%
1981	974	+38.0%
1991	711	−27.0%
2001	728	+2.4%
2011	655	−10.0%
