= Eiras e São Paulo de Frades =

- Civil parish
- Location in Portugal
- Coordinates: 40°14′6″N 8°25′4″W
- Country: Portugal
- Region: Centro
- Intermunic. comm.: Região de Coimbra
- District: Coimbra
- Municipality: Coimbra
- Established: 28 January 2013

Area
  - Total: 24.78 km^{2} (9.57 sq mi)

Population (2011)
  - Total: 17,921
  - Density: 720/km^{2} (1,900/sq mi)
- Time zone: UTC+00:00 (WET)
  - Summer (DST): UTC+01:00 (WEST)

Eiras e São Paulo de Frades (officially União das Freguesias de Eiras e São Paulo de Frades) is a civil parish in the municipality of Coimbra, Portugal. The population in 2011 was 17,921, in an area of 24.78 km^{2}. It was formed on 28 January 2013 by the merging of freguesias Eiras and São Paulo de Frades.
