= São Silvestre (Coimbra) =

- Civil parish
- Location in Portugal
- Coordinates: 40°13′49″N 8°31′25″W
- Country: Portugal
- Region: Centro
- Intermunic. comm.: Região de Coimbra
- District: Coimbra
- Municipality: Coimbra

Area
  - Total: 10.27 km^{2} (3.97 sq mi)

Population (2011)
  - Total: 3,122
  - Density: 300/km^{2} (790/sq mi)
- Time zone: UTC+00:00 (WET)
  - Summer (DST): UTC+01:00 (WEST)

São Silvestre (also known as São Silvestre do Campo) is a civil parish in the municipality of Coimbra, Portugal. The population in 2011 was 3,122, in an area of 10.27 km^{2}.

Population of the civil parish of São Silvestre (1864–2011)
Year	Pop.	±%
1864	1,082	—
1878	1,026	−5.2%
1890	1,128	+9.9%
1900	1,228	+8.9%
1911	1,401	+14.1%
1920	676	−51.7%
1930	1,355	+100.4%
1940	1,609	+18.7%
1950	1,748	+8.6%
1960	1,982	+13.4%
1970	2,141	+8.0%
1981	2,541	+18.7%
1991	2,544	+0.1%
2001	3,092	+21.5%
2011	3,122	+1.0%
