= Vil de Matos =

- Civil parish
- Location in Portugal
- Coordinates: 40°15′20″N 8°28′51″W
- Country: Portugal
- Region: Centro
- Intermunic. comm.: Região de Coimbra
- District: Coimbra
- Municipality: Coimbra
- Disbanded: 28 January 2013

Area
  - Total: 8.2 km^{2} (3.2 sq mi)

Population (2011)
  - Total: 870
  - Density: 110/km^{2} (270/sq mi)
- Time zone: UTC+00:00 (WET)
  - Summer (DST): UTC+01:00 (WEST)

Vil de Matos is a former civil parish in the municipality of Coimbra, Portugal. The population in 2011 was 870, in an area of 8.2 km^{2}. On 28 January 2013 it merged with Antuzede to form Antuzede e Vil de Matos.

It was previously part of the then-municipality Ançã. It was disbanded on 31 December 1853 and became part of the municipality of either Coimbra or Cantanhede, but after 24 October 1855 it was definitely part of Coimbra.

Population of the civil parish of Vil de Matos (1864–2011)
Year	Pop.	±%
1864	465	—
1878	562	+20.9%
1890	484	−13.9%
1900	433	−10.5%
1911	614	+41.8%
1920	654	+6.5%
1930	669	+2.3%
1940	688	+2.8%
1950	766	+11.3%
1960	743	−3.0%
1970	656	−11.7%
1981	730	+11.3%
1991	731	+0.1%
2001	775	+6.0%
2011	870	+12.3%
