= Souselas =

- Civil parish
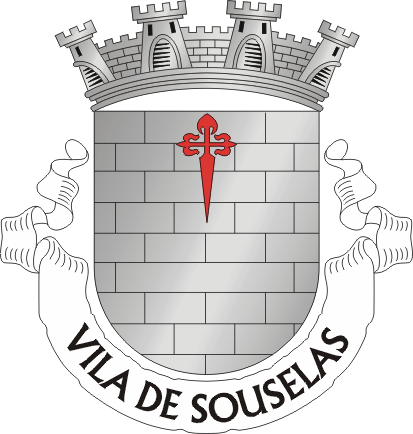
- Coat of arms

- Location in Portugal
- Coordinates: 40°17′12″N 8°25′30″W
- Country: Portugal
- Region: Centro
- Intermunic. comm.: Região de Coimbra
- District: Coimbra
- Municipality: Coimbra
- Disbanded: 28 January 2013

Area
  - Total: 14.94 km^{2} (5.77 sq mi)

Population (2011)
  - Total: 3,092
  - Density: 210/km^{2} (540/sq mi)
- Time zone: UTC+00:00 (WET)
  - Summer (DST): UTC+01:00 (WEST)
- Patron: James the Great

Souselas is a former civil parish in the municipality of Coimbra, Portugal. The population in 2011 was 3,092, in an area of 14.94 km^{2}. On 28 January 2013 it merged with Botão to form Souselas e Botão. It has the largest of three Cimpor factories in Portugal (the other ones being located in Alhandra, São João dos Montes e Calhandriz and Loulé).

Population of the civil parish of Souselas (1864–2011)
Year	Pop.	±%
1864	1,000	—
1878	1,246	+24.6%
1890	1,276	+2.4%
1900	1,247	−2.3%
1911	1,421	+14.0%
1920	1,351	−4.9%
1930	1,564	+15.8%
1940	1,770	+13.2%
1950	2,004	+13.2%
1960	2,221	+10.8%
1970	2,412	+8.6%
1981	3,058	+26.8%
1991	3,159	+3.3%
2001	3,146	−0.4%
2011	3,092	−1.7%
