= São João do Campo =

- Civil parish
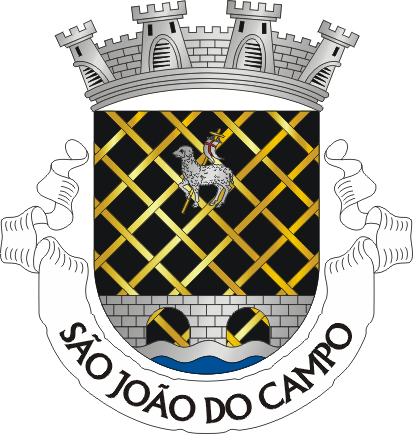
- Coat of arms

- Location in Portugal
- Coordinates: 40°14′36″N 8°30′41″W
- Country: Portugal
- Region: Centro
- Intermunic. comm.: Região de Coimbra
- District: Coimbra
- Municipality: Coimbra

Area
  - Total: 7.92 km^{2} (3.06 sq mi)

Population (2011)
  - Total: 2,073
  - Density: 260/km^{2} (680/sq mi)
- Time zone: UTC+00:00 (WET)
  - Summer (DST): UTC+01:00 (WEST)
- Patron: John the Baptist

São João do Campo is a civil parish in the municipality of Coimbra, Portugal. The population in 2011 was 2,073, in an area of 7.92 km^{2}. It was originally called Cioga do Campo and colloquially as Lavarrabos.

Population of the civil parish of São João do Campo (1864–2011)
Year	Pop.	±%
1864	822	—
1878	927	+12.8%
1890	952	+2.7%
1900	1,073	+12.7%
1911	1,198	+11.6%
1920	1,211	+1.1%
1930	1,372	+13.3%
1940	1,413	+3.0%
1950	1,485	+5.1%
1960	1,708	+15.0%
1970	1,850	+8.3%
1981	2,196	+18.7%
1991	2,261	+3.0%
2001	2,309	+2.1%
2011	2,073	−10.2%
