= Lamarosa =

- Civil parish
- Location in Portugal
- Coordinates: 40°13′34″N 8°34′21″W
- Country: Portugal
- Region: Centro
- Intermunic. comm.: Região de Coimbra
- District: Coimbra
- Municipality: Coimbra
- Established: 31 December 1853
- Disbanded: 28 January 2013

Area
  - Total: 16.16 km^{2} (6.24 sq mi)

Population (2011)
  - Total: 2,069
  - Density: 130/km^{2} (330/sq mi)
- Time zone: UTC+00:00 (WET)
  - Summer (DST): UTC+01:00 (WEST)

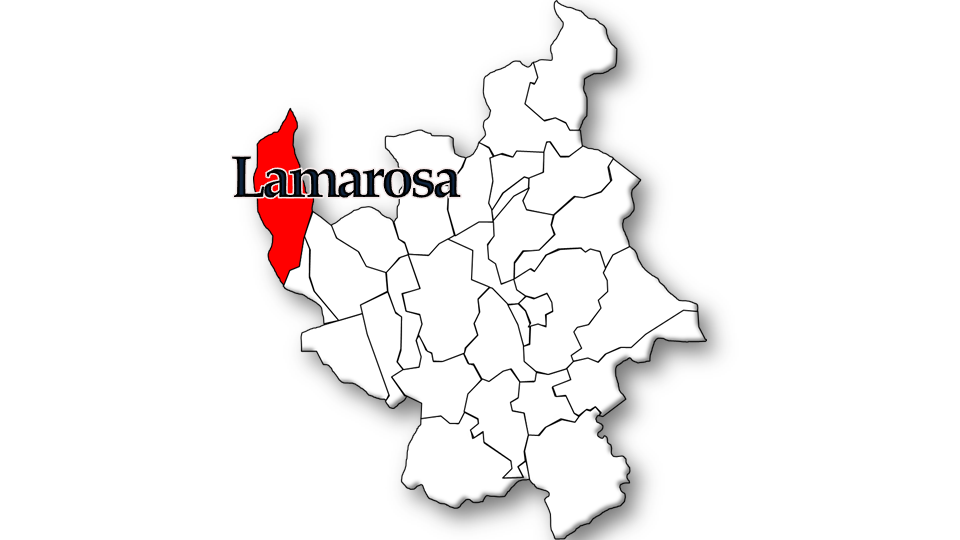

Lamarosa is a former civil parish in the municipality of Coimbra, Portugal. The population in 2011 was 2,069, in an area of 16.16 km^{2}. On 28 January 2013 it merged with São Martinho de Árvore to form São Martinho de Árvore e Lamarosa.

It was previously called Santo Varão da Lamarosa which was part of the then-municipality Tentúgal. It was disbanded on 31 December 1853 and became part of the municipality of Coimbra.

Population of the civil parish of Lamarosa (1864–2011)
Year	Pop.	±%
1864	1,116	—
1878	1,305	+16.9%
1890	1,324	+1.5%
1900	1,312	−0.9%
1911	1,628	+24.1%
1920	1,650	+1.4%
1930	1,651	+0.1%
1940	1,909	+15.6%
1950	1,910	+0.1%
1960	2,078	+8.8%
1970	1,958	−5.8%
1981	1,906	−2.7%
1991	1,989	+4.4%
2001	2,189	+10.1%
2011	2,069	−5.5%
