= Eiras (Coimbra) =

- Civil parish
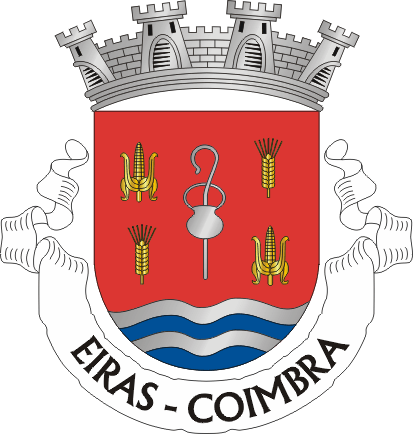
- Coat of arms

- Location in Portugal
- Coordinates: 40°14′6″N 8°25′4″W
- Country: Portugal
- Region: Centro
- Intermunic. comm.: Região de Coimbra
- District: Coimbra
- Municipality: Coimbra
- Disbanded: 28 January 2013

Area
  - Total: 9.02 km^{2} (3.48 sq mi)

Population (2011)
  - Total: 12,097
  - Density: 1,300/km^{2} (3,500/sq mi)
- Time zone: UTC+00:00 (WET)
  - Summer (DST): UTC+01:00 (WEST)
- Patron: James the Great

Eiras is a former civil parish in the municipality of Coimbra, Portugal. The population in 2011 was 12,097, in an area of 9.02 km^{2}. On 28 January 2013 it merged with São Paulo de Frades to form Eiras e São Paulo de Frades.

Population of the civil parish of Eiras (1801–2011)
Year	Pop.	±%
1801	654	—
1864	780	+19.3%
1878	970	+24.4%
1890	1,146	+18.1%
1900	1,223	+6.7%
1911	1,528	+24.9%
1920	1,576	+3.1%
1930	2,235	+41.8%
1940	2,780	+24.4%
1950	3,538	+27.3%
1960	3,988	+12.7%
1970	4,811	+20.6%
1981	8,364	+73.9%
1991	9,655	+15.4%
2001	12,052	+24.8%
2011	12,097	+0.4%
