= São Martinho do Bispo =

- Civil parish
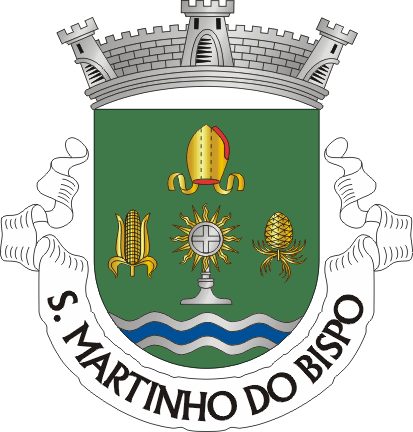
- Coat of arms

- Location in Portugal
- Coordinates: 40°12′47″N 8°28′10″W
- Country: Portugal
- Region: Centro
- Intermunic. comm.: Região de Coimbra
- District: Coimbra
- Municipality: Coimbra
- Disbanded: 28 January 2013

Area
  - Total: 16.96 km^{2} (6.55 sq mi)

Population (2011)
  - Total: 14,147
  - Density: 830/km^{2} (2,200/sq mi)
- Time zone: UTC+00:00 (WET)
  - Summer (DST): UTC+01:00 (WEST)

São Martinho do Bispo is a former civil parish in the municipality of Coimbra, Portugal. The population in 2011 was 14,147, in an area of 16.96 km^{2}. On 28 January 2013 it merged with Ribeira de Frades to form São Martinho do Bispo e Ribeira de Frades.

Population of the civil parish of São Martinho do Bispo (1864–2011)
Year	Pop.	±%
1864	3,212	—
1878	3,662	+14.0%
1890	4,052	+10.6%
1900	4,470	+10.3%
1911	5,113	+14.4%
1920	5,229	+2.3%
1930	6,023	+15.2%
1940	6,225	+3.4%
1950	7,666	+23.1%
1960	8,534	+11.3%
1970	9,581	+12.3%
1981	12,318	+28.6%
1991	12,484	+1.3%
2001	14,246	+14.1%
2011	14,147	−0.7%
