= Fountain of Calvo =

- Medium: Fountain
- Location: Coimbra, Portugal
- 40°7′44.36″N 8°23′16.09″W

The Fountain of Calvo (Portuguese: Fonte do Calvo) is a public/communal fountain and lavoir in the civil parish of Almalaguês, municipality of Coimbra that has existed for over 100 years, and is integral to the history and culture of the community.

The inhabitants of Almalaguês have systematically restored the fountain and lavoir historically, owing to its reputation for water quality. It has been the centre of the community since the regions formation, and its waters are used for domestic consumption (drinking and cooking), bathing and as a source of waters for communal clothes washing. Owing to the lack of piped water, this fountain provided all consumable water for the community. Transporting of water was usually completed using clay jars, used by many of the residents, and only replaced in the 20th century by the typical plastic bottles.

The fountain was also the destination of pilgrimages, including a legendary trip on Sunday Mass, where young people took the opportunity to date. Its centre of community life also allows the congregation of many of residents at the fountain, resulting in many relationships, leading to several marriages.
