= Souselas e Botão =

- Civil parish
- Location in Portugal
- Coordinates: 40°17′12″N 8°25′30″W
- Country: Portugal
- Region: Centro
- Intermunic. comm.: Região de Coimbra
- District: Coimbra
- Municipality: Coimbra

Area
  - Total: 33.01 km^{2} (12.75 sq mi)

Population (2011)
  - Total: 4,680
  - Density: 140/km^{2} (370/sq mi)
- Time zone: UTC+00:00 (WET)
  - Summer (DST): UTC+01:00 (WEST)

Souselas e Botão (officially União das Freguesias de Souselas e Botão) is a civil parish in the municipality of Coimbra, Portugal. The population in 2011 was 4,680, in an area of 33.01 km^{2}. It was formed on 28 January 2013 by the merging of freguesias Souselas and Botão.
