= Trouxemil e Torre de Vilela =

- Civil parish
- Location in Portugal
- Coordinates: 40°16′32″N 8°27′10″W
- Country: Portugal
- Region: Centro
- Intermunic. comm.: Região de Coimbra
- District: Coimbra
- Municipality: Coimbra
- Established: 28 January 2013

Area
  - Total: 10.56 km^{2} (4.08 sq mi)

Population (2011)
  - Total: 3,954
  - Density: 370/km^{2} (970/sq mi)
- Time zone: UTC+00:00 (WET)
  - Summer (DST): UTC+01:00 (WEST)

Trouxemil e Torre de Vilela (officially União das Freguesias de Trouxemil e Torre de Vilela) is a civil parish in the municipality of Coimbra, Portugal. The population in 2011 was 3,954, in an area of 10.56 km^{2}. It was formed on 28 January 2013 by the merging of freguesias Trouxemil and Torre de Vilela.
