= Botão =

- Civil parish
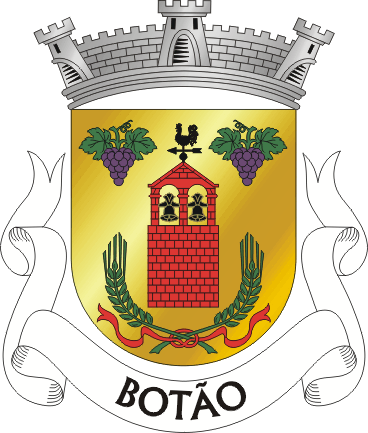
- Coat of arms

- Location in Portugal
- Coordinates: 40°18′24″N 8°23′58″W
- Country: Portugal
- Region: Centro
- Intermunic. comm.: Região de Coimbra
- District: Coimbra
- Municipality: Coimbra
- Disbanded: 28 January 2013

Area
  - Total: 16.52 km^{2} (6.38 sq mi)

Population (2011)
  - Total: 1,588
  - Density: 96/km^{2} (250/sq mi)
- Time zone: UTC+00:00 (WET)
  - Summer (DST): UTC+01:00 (WEST)
- Patron: Matthew the Apostle

Botão is a former civil parish in the municipality of Coimbra, Portugal. The population in 2011 was 1,588, in an area of 16.52 km^{2}. On 28 January 2013 it merged with Souselas to form Souselas e Botão.

Population of the civil parish of Botão (1864–2011)
Year	Pop.	±%
1864	1,036	—
1878	1,272	+22.8%
1890	1,236	−2.8%
1900	1,233	−0.2%
1911	1,329	+7.8%
1920	1,272	−4.3%
1930	1,331	+4.6%
1940	1,410	+5.9%
1950	1,522	+7.9%
1960	1,489	−2.2%
1970	1,571	+5.5%
1981	1,721	+9.5%
1991	1,625	−5.6%
2001	1,683	+3.6%
2011	1,588	−5.6%
