= São Paulo de Frades =

- Civil parish
- Location in Portugal
- Coordinates: 40°14′36″N 8°22′15″W
- Country: Portugal
- Region: Centro
- Intermunic. comm.: Região de Coimbra
- District: Coimbra
- Municipality: Coimbra
- Disbanded: 28 January 2013

Area
  - Total: 14.93 km^{2} (5.76 sq mi)

Population (2011)
  - Total: 5,824
  - Density: 390/km^{2} (1,000/sq mi)
- Time zone: UTC+00:00 (WET)
  - Summer (DST): UTC+01:00 (WEST)
- Patron: Paul the Apostle

São Paulo de Frades is a former civil parish in the municipality of Coimbra, Portugal. The population in 2011 was 5,824, in an area of 14.93 km^{2}. On 28 January 2013 it merged with Eiras to form Eiras e São Paulo de Frades.

Population of the civil parish of São Paulo de Frades (1864–2011)
Year	Pop.	±%
1864	869	—
1878	1,038	+19.4%
1890	1,107	+6.6%
1900	1,216	+9.8%
1911	1,359	+11.8%
1920	1,415	+4.1%
1930	1,626	+14.9%
1940	1,836	+12.9%
1950	2,055	+11.9%
1960	2,469	+20.1%
1970	3,115	+26.2%
1981	3,913	+25.6%
1991	4,732	+20.9%
2001	5,912	+24.9%
2011	5,824	−1.5%
