= Antuzede e Vil de Matos =

- Civil parish
- Location in Portugal
- Coordinates: 40.255°N 8.480°W
- Country: Portugal
- Region: Centro
- Intermunic. comm.: Região de Coimbra
- District: Coimbra
- Municipality: Coimbra

Area
  - Total: 17.63 km^{2} (6.81 sq mi)

Population (2011)
  - Total: 3,146
  - Density: 180/km^{2} (460/sq mi)
- Time zone: UTC+00:00 (WET)
  - Summer (DST): UTC+01:00 (WEST)

Antuzede e Vil de Matos (officially União das Freguesias de Antuzede e Vil de Matos) is a civil parish in the municipality of Coimbra, Portugal. It was formed in 2013 by the merging of the former parishes Antuzede and Vil de Matos. The population in 2011 was 3,146, in an area of 17,63 km².
