= Torres do Mondego =

- Civil parish
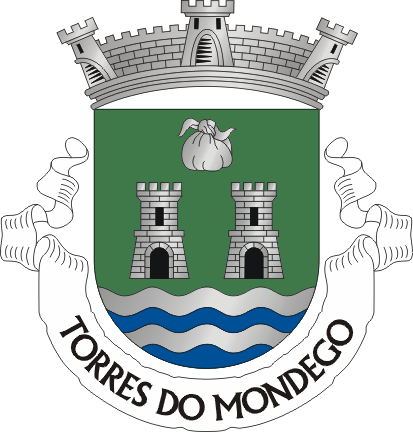
- Coat of arms

- Location in Portugal
- Coordinates: 40°11′43″N 8°22′50″W
- Country: Portugal
- Region: Centro
- Intermunic. comm.: Região de Coimbra
- District: Coimbra
- Municipality: Coimbra
- Established: 1 February 1934

Area
  - Total: 16.66 km^{2} (6.43 sq mi)

Population (2011)
  - Total: 2,402
  - Density: 140/km^{2} (370/sq mi)
- Time zone: UTC+00:00 (WET)
  - Summer (DST): UTC+01:00 (WEST)

Torres do Mondego is a civil parish in the municipality of Coimbra, Portugal. The population in 2021 was 2,034, in an area of 16.66 km^{2}. It was established on 1 February 1934.

Population of the civil parish of Torres do Mondego (1940–2011)
| Year | Pop. | ±% |
|---|---|---|
| 1940 | 2,372 | — |
| 1950 | 2,401 | +1.2% |
| 1960 | 2,556 | +6.5% |
| 1970 | 2,636 | +3.1% |
| 1981 | 2,976 | +12.9% |
| 1991 | 2,739 | −8.0% |
| 2001 | 2,550 | −6.9% |
| 2011 | 2,402 | −5.8% |
| 2021 | 2,034 | −15.3% |
