= São Martinho de Árvore e Lamarosa =

- Civil parish
- Location in Portugal
- Coordinates: 40°13′34″N 8°34′21″W
- Country: Portugal
- Region: Centro
- Intermunic. comm.: Região de Coimbra
- District: Coimbra
- Municipality: Coimbra

Area
  - Total: 20.88 km^{2} (8.06 sq mi)

Population (2011)
  - Total: 3,102
  - Density: 150/km^{2} (380/sq mi)
- Time zone: UTC+00:00 (WET)
  - Summer (DST): UTC+01:00 (WEST)
- Website: https://uf-saomartinhodearvorelamarosa.pt/

São Martinho de Árvore e Lamarosa (officially União das Freguesias de São Martinho de Árvore e Lamarosa) is a civil parish in the municipality of Coimbra, Portugal. The population in 2011 was 3,102, in an area of 20.88 km^{2}. It was formed on 28 January 2013 by the merging of freguesias São Martinho de Árvore and Lamarosa.
