= Antuzede =

- Civil parish
- Location in Portugal
- Coordinates: 40°15′20″N 8°28′51″W
- Country: Portugal
- Region: Centro
- Intermunic. comm.: Região de Coimbra
- District: Coimbra
- Municipality: Coimbra
- Disbanded: 28 January 2013

Area
  - Total: 9.12 km^{2} (3.52 sq mi)

Population (2011)
  - Total: 2,276
  - Density: 250/km^{2} (650/sq mi)
- Time zone: UTC+00:00 (WET)
  - Summer (DST): UTC+01:00 (WEST)

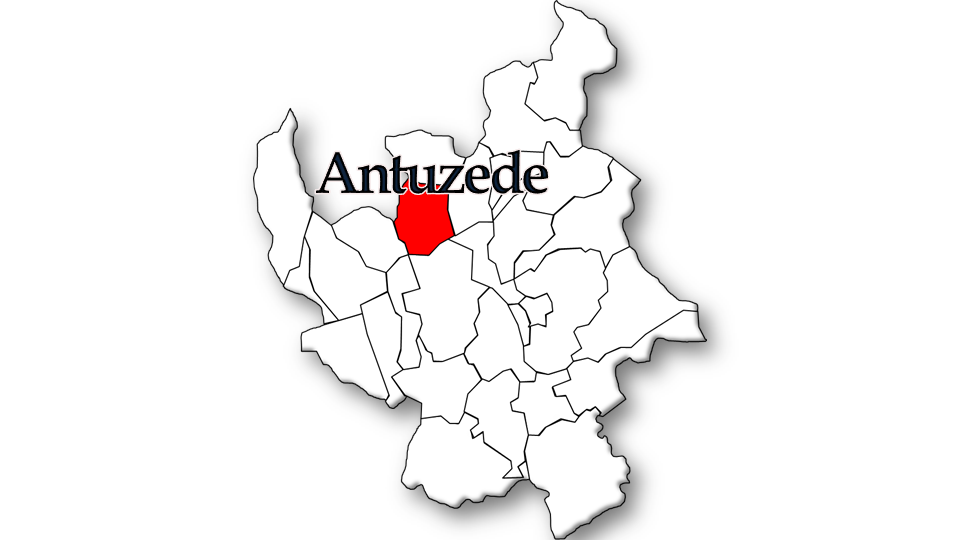
Antuzede

Antuzede is a former civil parish in the municipality of Coimbra, Portugal. The population in 2011 was 2,276, in an area of 9.12 km^{2}. On 28 January 2013 it merged with Vil de Matos to form Antuzede e Vil de Matos.

Population of the civil parish of Antuzede (1864–2011)
Year	Pop.	±%
1864	603	—
1878	721	+19.6%
1890	630	−12.6%
1900	751	+19.2%
1911	860	+14.5%
1920	1,018	+18.4%
1930	1,074	+5.5%
1940	1,233	+14.8%
1950	1,421	+15.2%
1960	1,624	+14.3%
1970	1,737	+7.0%
1981	2,256	+29.9%
1991	2,002	−11.3%
2001	2,265	+13.1%
2011	2,276	+0.5%
