= Trouxemil =

- Civil parish
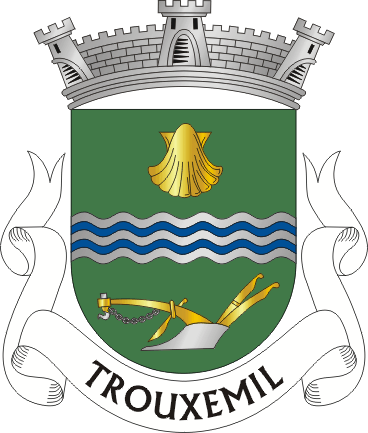
- Coat of arms

- Location in Portugal
- Coordinates: 40°16′32″N 8°27′10″W
- Country: Portugal
- Region: Centro
- Intermunic. comm.: Região de Coimbra
- District: Coimbra
- Municipality: Coimbra
- Disbanded: 28 January 2013

Area
  - Total: 7.81 km^{2} (3.02 sq mi)

Population (2011)
  - Total: 2,712
  - Density: 350/km^{2} (900/sq mi)
- Time zone: UTC+00:00 (WET)
  - Summer (DST): UTC+01:00 (WEST)
- Patron: James the Great

Trouxemil is a former civil parish in the municipality of Coimbra, Portugal. The population in 2011 was 2,712, in an area of 7.81 km^{2}. On 28 January 2013 it merged with Torre de Vilela to form Trouxemil e Torre de Vilela.

Population of the civil parish of Trouxemil (1864–2011)
Year	Pop.	±%
1864	861	—
1878	939	+9.1%
1890	965	+2.8%
1900	1,099	+13.9%
1911	1,283	+16.7%
1920	1,215	−5.3%
1930	1,421	+17.0%
1940	1,731	+21.8%
1950	1,931	+11.6%
1960	2,160	+11.9%
1970	2,294	+6.2%
1981	1,864	−18.7%
1991	2,952	+58.4%
2001	2,999	+1.6%
2011	2,712	−9.6%
