= Taveiro, Ameal e Arzila =

- Civil parish
- Location in Portugal
- Coordinates: 40°12′8″N 8°30′34″W
- Country: Portugal
- Region: Centro
- Intermunic. comm.: Região de Coimbra
- District: Coimbra
- Municipality: Coimbra
- Established: 28 January 2013

Area
  - Total: 24.34 km^{2} (9.40 sq mi)

Population (2021)
  - Total: 3,997
  - Density: 160/km^{2} (430/sq mi)
- Time zone: UTC+00:00 (WET)
  - Summer (DST): UTC+01:00 (WEST)

Taveiro, Ameal e Arzila (officially União das Freguesias de Taveiro, Ameal e Arzila) is a civil parish in the municipality of Coimbra, Portugal. The population in 2021 was 3,997, in an area of 24.34 km^{2}. It was formed on 28 January 2013 by the merging of freguesias Taveiro, Ameal, and Arzila. It's one of the few freguesias with an exclave (which is in the territory of São Martinho do Bispo e Ribeira de Frades).
