= São Martinho de Árvore =

- Civil parish
- Location in Portugal
- Coordinates: 40°13′12″N 8°33′53″W
- Country: Portugal
- Region: Centro
- Intermunic. comm.: Região de Coimbra
- District: Coimbra
- Municipality: Coimbra
- Disbanded: 28 January 2013

Area
  - Total: 3.26 km^{2} (1.26 sq mi)

Population (2011)
  - Total: 1,033
  - Density: 320/km^{2} (820/sq mi)
- Time zone: UTC+00:00 (WET)
  - Summer (DST): UTC+01:00 (WEST)

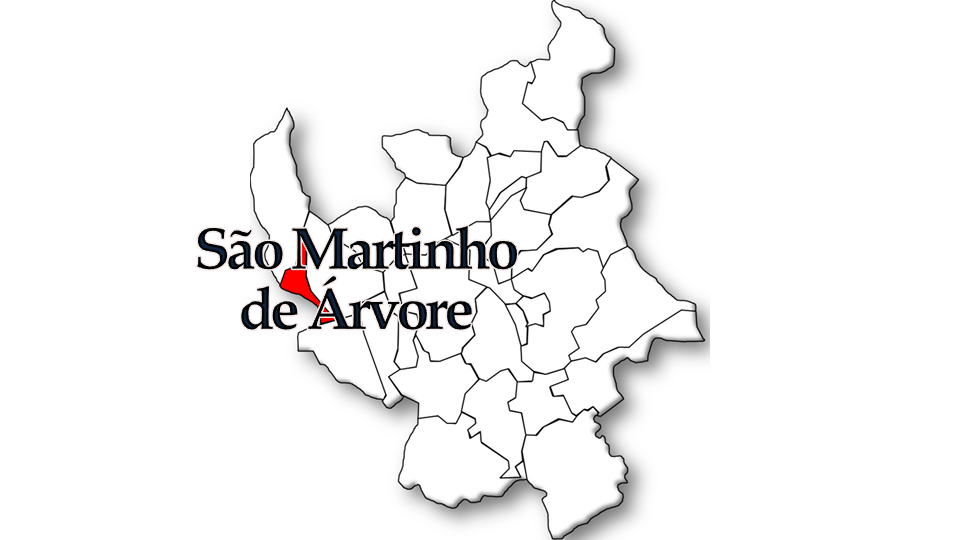

São Martinho de Árvore (also known simply as Árvore) is a former civil parish in the municipality of Coimbra, Portugal. The population in 2011 was 1,033, in an area of 3.26 km^{2}. On 28 January 2013 it merged with Lamarosa to form São Martinho de Árvore e Lamarosa.

It was previously part of the then-municipality Tentúgal. It was disbanded on 31 December 1853 and became part of the municipality of Coimbra.

Population of the civil parish of São Martinho de Árvore (1864–2011)
| Year | Pop. | ±% |
|---|---|---|
| 1864 | 365 | — |
| 1878 | 453 | +24.1% |
| 1890 | 451 | −0.4% |
| 1900 | 515 | +14.2% |
| 1911 | 580 | +12.6% |
| 1920 | 423 | −27.1% |
| 1930 | 502 | +18.7% |
| 1940 | 562 | +12.0% |
| 1950 | 693 | +23.3% |
| 1960 | 717 | +3.5% |
| 1970 | 770 | +7.4% |
| 1981 | 922 | +19.7% |
| 1991 | 978 | +6.1% |
| 2001 | 1,003 | +2.6% |
| 2011 | 1,033 | +3.0% |
