= Rui Miguel (footballer, born 1984) =

Portuguese footballer

Personal information
- Full name: Rui Miguel Marinho dos Reis
- Date of birth: 30 January 1984 (age 42)
- Place of birth: Ceira, Portugal
- Height: 1.83 m (6 ft 0 in)
- Position: Forward

Youth career
- 1994–2002: Académica

Senior career*
Years	Team	Apps	(Gls)
2002–2004	Académica B	51	(11)
2004–2005	→ Sporting Pombal (loan)	28	(5)
2005–2008	Académica	3	(1)
2006–2008	→ Tourizense (loan)	51	(15)
2008	Lokomotiv Mezdra	15	(3)
2009–2010	CSKA Sofia	33	(8)
2010–2011	Kilmarnock	21	(2)
2011–2012	Académica	17	(0)
2012–2013	Penafiel	16	(5)
2013–2014	Moreirense	24	(3)
2014–2016	Penafiel	26	(9)
2016–2017	Académica	31	(10)
2017–2018	Gil Vicente	18	(6)
2018–2019	Sourense	12	(9)
2019–2021	Pampilhosa	26	(15)
2021–2023	União Coimbra	48	(21)
2023–2024	Sourense	22	(7)
Total		442	(130)
- * Club domestic league appearances and goals

Rui Miguel Marinho dos Reis (born 30 January 1984), known as Rui Miguel, is a Portuguese former professional footballer who played as a forward.

== Career ==
Born in Ceira, Coimbra District, Rui Miguel joined Académica de Coimbra's youth ranks at the age of 10, but never really broke into the main squad. He served two loans in the lower leagues and only made three first-team appearances, the first coming on 15 April 2006 in the dying stages of the season, at Rio Ave FC: the Students won 4–1, and he scored as a starter.

In the summer of 2008, Rui Miguel moved abroad after signing with Bulgarian club PFC Lokomotiv Mezdra, netting three goals in the first half of the campaign. In January 2009, he changed teams again but stayed in the country, joining PFC CSKA Sofia alongside his teammate and compatriot David Silva. He scored his first goals in his second match, netting twice against PFC Lokomotiv Plovdiv for a final 3–1 victory and adding another in his third appearance, against FC Spartak Varna (2–0).

Rui Miguel signed a one-year contract with Kilmarnock on 16 September 2010, again rejoining Silva. He scored his first goal for the side the following 23 October, but in a 1–2 home loss to Inverness Caledonian Thistle.

On 17 June 2011, Rui Miguel returned to Académica who were still in the Primeira Liga, joining on a free transfer and contributing two appearances as the club won the Taça de Portugal for the first time in 73 years. During summer 2012 he spent time on trial at Oldham Athletic, and was offered a contract; talks eventually stalled over his agent's fee.

In the following four seasons, Rui Miguel competed mostly in the Segunda Liga, representing F.C. Penafiel and Moreirense FC. The exception to this was in 2014–15 when he appeared in eight scoreless matches for the former, who suffered top-division relegation as last.

On 21 June 2016, aged 32, Rui Miguel rejoined Académica for a third stint.

== Honours ==
Académica

- Taça de Portugal: 2011–12

Moreirense

- LigaPro: 2013–14
