= Taveiro =

- Civil parish
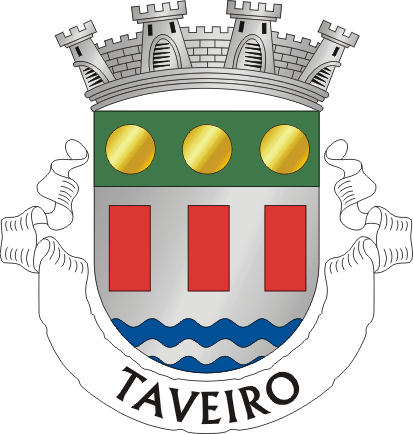
- Coat of arms

- Location in Portugal
- Coordinates: 40°12′8″N 8°30′34″W
- Country: Portugal
- Region: Centro
- Intermunic. comm.: Região de Coimbra
- District: Coimbra
- Municipality: Coimbra
- Disbanded: 28 January 2013

Area
  - Total: 10.23 km^{2} (3.95 sq mi)

Population (2011)
  - Total: 1,948
  - Density: 190/km^{2} (490/sq mi)
- Time zone: UTC+00:00 (WET)
  - Summer (DST): UTC+01:00 (WEST)
- Patron: Saint Lawrence

Taveiro is a former civil parish in the municipality of Coimbra, Portugal. The population in 2011 was 1,948, in an area of 10.23 km^{2}. On 28 January 2013 it merged with Ameal and Arzila to form Taveiro, Ameal e Arzila.

Population of the civil parish of Taveiro (1864–2011)
Year	Pop.	±%
1864	882	—
1878	910	+3.2%
1890	933	+2.5%
1900	1,007	+7.9%
1911	1,248	+23.9%
1920	1,129	−9.5%
1930	1,319	+16.8%
1940	1,429	+8.3%
1950	1,617	+13.2%
1960	1,681	+4.0%
1970	1,818	+8.1%
1981	2,152	+18.4%
1991	1,924	−10.6%
2001	2,064	+7.3%
2011	1,948	−5.6%
