= Almalaguês =

- Civil parish
- Location in Portugal
- Coordinates: 40.130°N 8.396°W
- Country: Portugal
- Region: Centro
- Intermunic. comm.: Região de Coimbra
- District: Coimbra
- Municipality: Coimbra

Area
  - Total: 23.16 km^{2} (8.94 sq mi)
- Elevation: 195 m (640 ft)

Population (2011)
  - Total: 3,111
  - Density: 130/km^{2} (350/sq mi)
- Time zone: UTC+00:00 (WET)
  - Summer (DST): UTC+01:00 (WEST)

Almalaguês (in old orthography, Almalaguez) is a civil parish in the municipality of Coimbra, Portugal. The population in 2011 was 3,111, in an area of 23.16 km².

== See also ==
- Fountain of Calvo
