= Barco e Coutada =

- Civil parish
- Location in Portugal
- Coordinates: 40.174°N 7.610°W
- Country: Portugal
- Region: Centro
- Intermunic. comm.: Beiras e Serra da Estrela
- District: Castelo Branco
- Municipality: Covilhã

Area
  - Total: 24.03 km^{2} (9.28 sq mi)

Population (2011)
  - Total: 879
  - Density: 37/km^{2} (95/sq mi)
- Time zone: UTC+00:00 (WET)
  - Summer (DST): UTC+01:00 (WEST)

Barco e Coutada is a civil parish in the municipality of Covilhã, Portugal. It was formed in 2013 by the merger of the former parishes Barco and Coutada. The population in 2011 was 879, in an area of 24.03 square kilometres (9.28 sq mi).
