= Nadadouro =

- Civil parish
- Location in Portugal
- Coordinates: 39.421°N 9.189°W
- Country: Portugal
- Region: Oeste e Vale do Tejo
- Intermunic. comm.: Oeste
- District: Leiria
- Municipality: Caldas da Rainha

Area
  - Total: 10.60 km^{2} (4.09 sq mi)

Population (2011)
  - Total: 1,904
  - Density: 179.6/km^{2} (465.2/sq mi)
- Time zone: UTC+00:00 (WET)
  - Summer (DST): UTC+01:00 (WEST)
- Website: https://www.freguesiadenadadouro.pt/

Nadadouro is one of twelve civil parishes (freguesias) in the municipality of Caldas da Rainha, Portugal. The population in 2021 was 1,962, in an area of 10.60 km^{2}.

The parish of Nadadouro borders the popular tourist destination of the Lagoa de Óbidos which is a lagoon located in the municipalities Óbidos and Caldas da Rainha, Portugal. It empties into the Atlantic Ocean at Foz do Arelho.

== Villages ==
- Alto
- Alto Nobre
- Barrosa
- Casal Avé Maria
- Casais de Baixo
- Casal das Salgueiras
- Casal dos Chãos
- Cumeira
- Casal Novo
- Casais da Fonte
- Corujeira
- Casais do Vale de Égua
- Casais do Regato
- Casinhas
- Cercas
- Covões
- Poça dos Ninhos
- Panascosas
- Pedreirinha
- Touguio
