= Monte da Pedra =

Coordinates: 39°21′52″N 7°45′00″W

Monte da Pedra is a Portuguese freguesia ("parish") in the municipality of Crato, Portugal.

The name of the village means "stone hill".
