= Brasfemes =

- Civil parish
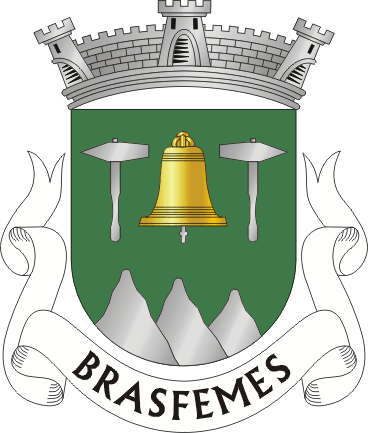
- Coat of arms

- Location in Portugal
- Coordinates: 40°16′21″N 8°23′55″W
- Country: Portugal
- Region: Centro
- Intermunic. comm.: Região de Coimbra
- District: Coimbra
- Municipality: Coimbra

Area
  - Total: 9.18 km^{2} (3.54 sq mi)

Population (2021)
  - Total: 1,935
  - Density: 210/km^{2} (550/sq mi)
- Time zone: UTC+00:00 (WET)
  - Summer (DST): UTC+01:00 (WEST)

Brasfemes is a civil parish in the municipality of Coimbra, Portugal. The population in 2021 was 1,935, in an area of 9.18 km^{2}.

Population of the civil parish of Brasfemes (1864–2021)
Year	Pop.	±%
1864	890	—
1878	987	+10.9%
1890	759	−23.1%
1900	831	+9.5%
1911	956	+15.0%
1920	877	−8.3%
1930	967	+10.3%
1940	1,127	+16.5%
1950	1,249	+10.8%
1960	1,353	+8.3%
1970	1,508	+11.5%
1981	1,758	+16.6%
1991	1,695	−3.6%
2001	1,847	+9.0%
2011	1,969	+6.6%
2021	1,935	−1.7%
