= Tronco =

Tronco means trunk, torso, truncated in several Romance languages. It is the surname of the following people:

- Cristopher Tronco Sánchez (born 1985), Mexican swimmer
- Louriza Tronco (born 1993), Canadian actress and singer
- Robbie Tronco, American DJ
