= Ceira (Coimbra) =

- Civil parish
- Location in Portugal
- Coordinates: 40.172°N 8.392°W
- Country: Portugal
- Region: Centro
- Intermunic. comm.: Região de Coimbra
- District: Coimbra
- Municipality: Coimbra

Area
  - Total: 12.42 km^{2} (4.80 sq mi)

Population (2011)
  - Total: 3,701
  - Density: 300/km^{2} (770/sq mi)
- Time zone: UTC+00:00 (WET)
  - Summer (DST): UTC+01:00 (WEST)

Ceira is a civil parish in Coimbra Municipality, Portugal. The population in 2011 was 3,701, in an area of 12.42 km^{2}.
