= Assafarge e Antanhol =

- Civil parish
- Location in Portugal
- Coordinates: 40.159°N 8.432°W
- Country: Portugal
- Region: Centro
- Intermunic. comm.: Região de Coimbra
- District: Coimbra
- Municipality: Coimbra

Area
  - Total: 19.51 km^{2} (7.53 sq mi)

Population (2011)
  - Total: 5,302
  - Density: 270/km^{2} (700/sq mi)
- Time zone: UTC+00:00 (WET)
  - Summer (DST): UTC+01:00 (WEST)

Assafarge e Antanhol is a civil parish in the municipality of Coimbra, Portugal. It was formed in 2013 by the merger of the former parishes Assafarge and Antanhol. The population in 2011 was 5,302, in an area of 19.51 km².
