= A dos Francos =

Civil parish of Caldas da Rainha, Portugal

- Civil parish
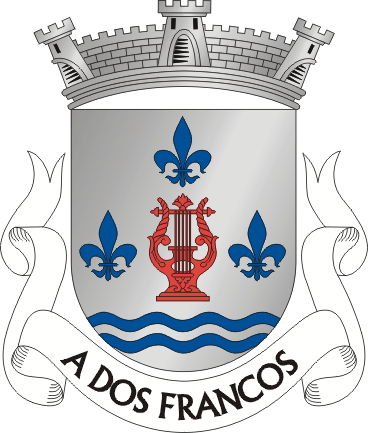
- Coat of arms

- Location in Portugal
- Coordinates: 39.323°N 9.048°W
- Country: Portugal
- Region: Oeste e Vale do Tejo
- Intermunic. comm.: Oeste
- District: Leiria
- Municipality: Caldas da Rainha

Area
  - Total: 18.93 km^{2} (7.31 sq mi)
- Elevation: 75 m (246 ft)

Population (2011)
  - Total: 1,701
  - Density: 90/km^{2} (230/sq mi)
- Time zone: UTC+00:00 (WET)
  - Summer (DST): UTC+01:00 (WEST)
- Postal code: 2500
- Area code: 262
- Patron: Nossa Senhora da Graça and São Silvestre

A dos Francos is one of twelve civil parishes (freguesias) in the municipality of Caldas da Rainha, Portugal. The population in 2011 was 1,701, in an area of 18.93 km^{2}. It includes the settlements A dos Francos, Broeiras, Carreiros, Casais da Aramanha, Casais da Bica, Casais da Paraventa, Casais de Santa Helena, Casais Gaiolas, Casal da Palmeira, Casal das Cheiras, Casal das Sesmarias, Casal Sobreiro, Casal Pinheiro, Casal Val Covo, Salgueirinha, Santa Susana and Vila Verde de Matos.

== History ==
The history and toponymy of this parish can be traced back to the French; the name, itself, evokes French ownership or dominion of this area. A dos French literally means of the French. In fact, it was Afonso Henriques, who had a hand in its nomenclature; in order to reward mercenary French crusaders who assisted his early campaigns, Afonso Henriques distributed some lands along the margins of the Tagus, living behind names that only hint at French influence, including Vila Franca and A dos Francos.

The Chapel of the Holy Spirit was constructed by the Crusaders during the 12th century, who fell within the territorial influence of Óbidos.

These foreign colonies including those in the Estremadura were favored by King Sancho, who also received complementary immigrants from Flanders, who populated the northern parts of the Tagus.

In 1747, the population of this village included twelve homes. By 1853, the parish had amassed a small cluster of 101 homes.

== Architecture ==
=== Civic ===
- Carriage Post/Station of Casal dos Carreiros (Portuguese: Estação da Mala-Posta do Casal dos Carreiros), constructed in the 19th century, accompanying the building of the Lisbon-Porto carriage traffic, this building served as a hostel for travellers, serving meals and providing sleeping spaces and fireplace for use in the winter months

=== Religious ===
- Chapel of the Holy Spirit (Portuguese: Capela do Espiríto Santo), an eclectic chapel, that was originally constructed by French crusader knights, who inhabited and populated the region;
- Church of São Silvestre (Portuguese: Igreja Paroquial de A dos Francos/Igreja de São Silvestre), the 18th-century church was constructed in the Baroque style, and includes elaborate gilded wood altarpiece and retable, and single belfry, typical of the Portuguese small parish churches of the time;
- Hermitage of Vila Verde do Mato (Portuguese: Ermida de Vila Verde do Mato), the partially ruined hermitage, constructed in the 17th century, is remarkable for the remnants of the main altar with polychromatic decoration and ochre marbling, and construction in the Mannerist architecture of the period.

== Villages ==
- Broeiras
- Vila Verde de Matos
- Salgueirinha
- Casal Sobreiro
- Carreiros
- Casais de Santa Helena
- Casais da Paraventa
- Santa Susana
- Casais da Aramanha
- Casais da Bica
- Casais Gaiolas
- Casal Pinheiro
- Casal das Sesmarias
- Casal das Cheiras
- Casal da Palmeira
- Casal Val Covo
