= Cernache =

- Civil parish
- Location in Portugal
- Coordinates: 40°8′25″N 8°28′5″W
- Country: Portugal
- Region: Centro
- Intermunic. comm.: Região de Coimbra
- District: Coimbra
- Municipality: Coimbra

Area
  - Total: 19.17 km^{2} (7.40 sq mi)

Population (2021)
  - Total: 3,957
  - Density: 210/km^{2} (530/sq mi)
- Time zone: UTC+00:00 (WET)
  - Summer (DST): UTC+01:00 (WEST)

Cernache is a civil parish in the municipality of Coimbra, Portugal. The population in 2021 was 3,957, in an area of 19.17 km^{2}.

Population of the civil parish of Cernache (1864–2021)
Year	Pop.	±%
1864	2,309	—
1878	2,686	+16.3%
1890	2,828	+5.3%
1900	2,866	+1.3%
1911	2,927	+2.1%
1920	2,811	−4.0%
1930	2,850	+1.4%
1940	3,010	+5.6%
1950	2,964	−1.5%
1960	3,030	+2.2%
1970	3,101	+2.3%
1981	3,496	+12.7%
1991	3,650	+4.4%
2001	3,871	+6.1%
2011	4,048	+4.6%
2021	3,957	−2.2%
