= São Martinho do Bispo e Ribeira de Frades =

- Civil parish
- Coordinates: 40°12′47″N 8°28′10″W
- Country: Portugal
- Region: Centro
- Intermunic. comm.: Região de Coimbra
- District: Coimbra
- Municipality: Coimbra
- Established: 28 January 2013

Area
  - Total: 24.68 km^{2} (9.53 sq mi)

Population (2021)
  - Total: 15,322
  - Density: 620/km^{2} (1,600/sq mi)
- Time zone: UTC+00:00 (WET)
  - Summer (DST): UTC+01:00 (WEST)
- Patron: Martin of Tours and São Miguel Arcanjo
- Website: https://saomartinhodobispoeribeiradefrades.pt/

São Martinho do Bispo e Ribeira de Frades (officially União das Freguesias de São Martinho do Bispo e Ribeira de Frades) is a civil parish in the municipality of Coimbra, Portugal. The population in 2021 was 15,322, in an area of 24.68 km^{2}. It was the result of two freguesias joining on 28 January 2013; São Martinho do Bispo and Ribeira de Frades.
