= Crato, Portugal =

Crato
- Municipality
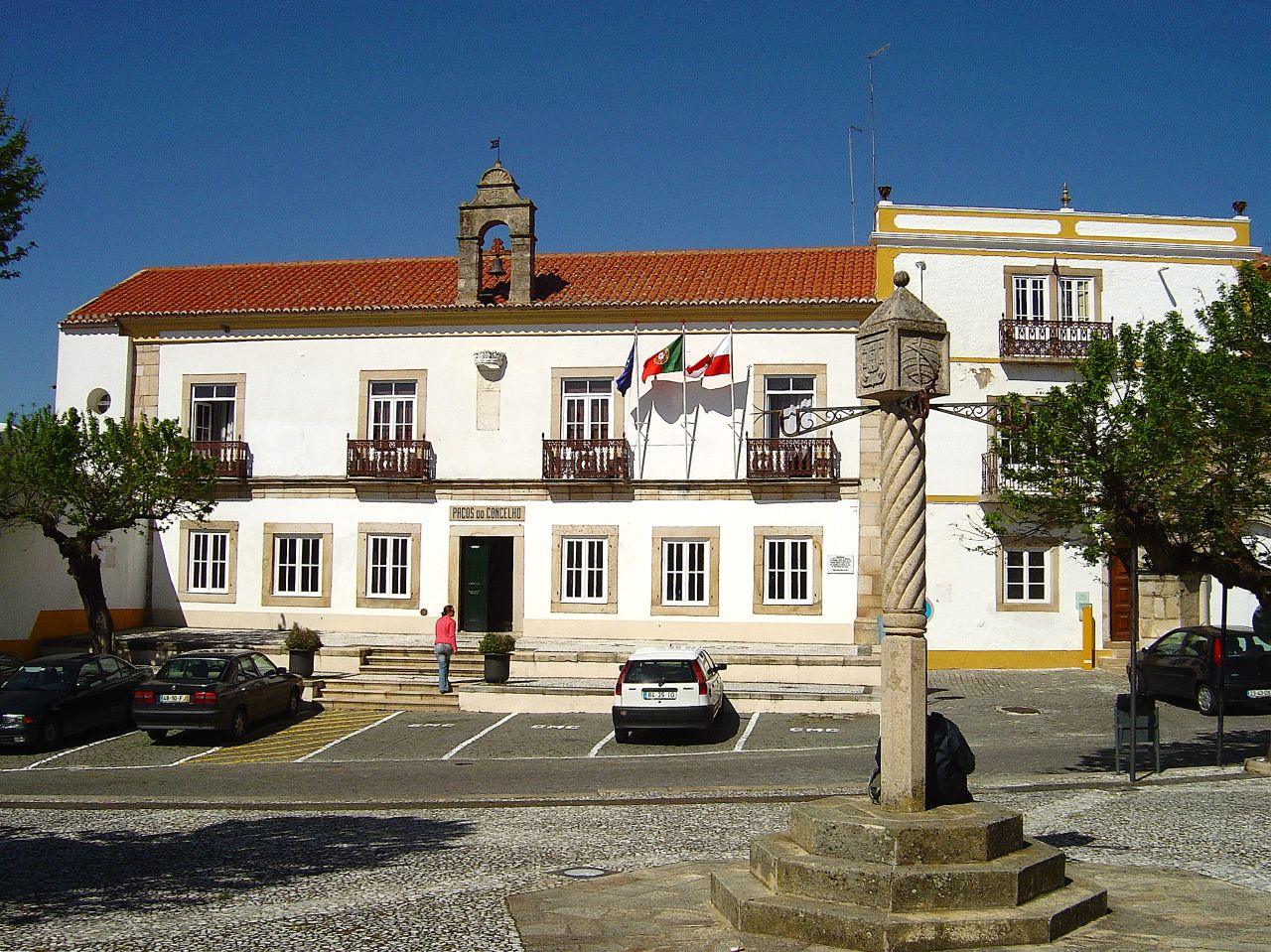

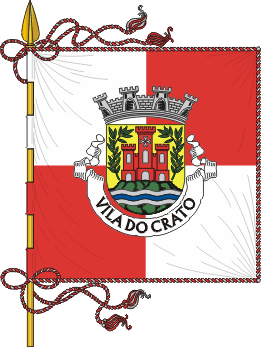
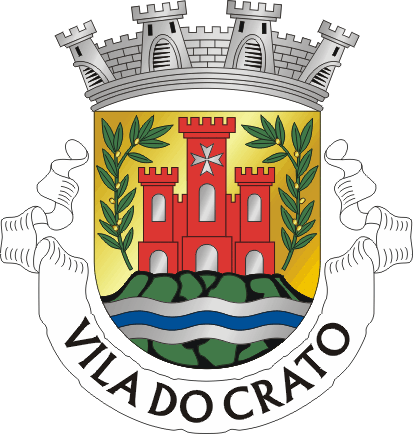
- Flag Coat of arms
- Interactive map of Crato
- Location in Portugal
- Coordinates: 39°17′N 7°38′W
- Country: Portugal
- Region: Alentejo
- Intermunic. comm.: Alto Alentejo
- District: Portalegre
- Parishes: 4

Government
  - President: José Luz (PS)

Area
  - Total: 398.07 km^{2} (153.70 sq mi)

Population (2011)
  - Total: 3,708
  - Density: 9.315/km^{2} (24.13/sq mi)
- Time zone: UTC+00:00 (WET)
  - Summer (DST): UTC+01:00 (WEST)
- Local holiday: Easter Monday date varies
- Website: http://www.cm-crato.pt

Crato (Portuguese pronunciation: [ˈkɾatu]) is a municipality in Portalegre District in Portugal. The population in 2011 was 3,708, in an area of 398.07 km^{2}.

The present Mayor is José Correia Luz, elected by the Socialist Party. The municipal holiday is Easter Monday.

== Parishes ==
Administratively, the municipality is divided into 5 civil parishes (freguesias):

- Aldeia da Mata
- Crato e Mártires, Flor da Rosa e Vale do Peso
- Gáfete
- Monte da Pedra

== History ==
Crato has been the headquarters of the Knights Hospitaller in Portugal since 1340. The head of the order was known as the Prior of Crato.
