= Assafarge =

- Civil parish
- Location in Portugal
- Coordinates: 40°9′17″N 8°25′53″W
- Country: Portugal
- Region: Centro
- Intermunic. comm.: Região de Coimbra
- District: Coimbra
- Municipality: Coimbra
- Established: Settlement: fl. 1100; Parish: c. 1120
- Disbanded: 2013

Area
  - Total: 9.72 km^{2} (3.75 sq mi)
- Elevation: 174 m (571 ft)

Population (2001)
  - Total: 2,268
  - Density: 233/km^{2} (604/sq mi)
- Time zone: UTC+00:00 (WET)
  - Summer (DST): UTC+01:00 (WEST)
- Postal code: 3040-657
- Area code: 239
- Patron: Nossa Senhora da Conceição
- Website: www.freguesiadeassafarge.eu

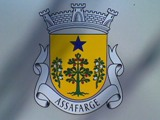
Flag of Assafarge

Assafarge is a former civil parish in the southern part of the municipality of Coimbra, Portugal. In 2013, the parish merged into the new parish Assafarge e Antanhol. It has a population of 2268 inhabitants (2001 Census) and occupies an area of 9.72 km^{2} (3.75 sq mi).

== History ==
The earliest histories of this region include the discovery of a polished stone implement, although there are no records prior to Roman intersession in the territory.

The unearthing, between the localities of Carvalhais de Cima and Carvalhais de Baixo, of several irregular cavities allude to Moorish influence in the zone. It is also likely that local peoples may have dugout these holes in order to discover the treasure of the Moors, which they assumed was buried in the spaces.

The local toponymy had its base in these early Arab settlers; the name, sometimes written as Açafarge, Açafargel, Safarge, Assafarja, Azofargelas, Azofarge, Asafarge, Assofragea or Alçoforge, may have originated from the Arabic Açafargel (plural Açafarge), which refers to the pome fruit quince.

Evidence from historical documents suggest that the parish was founded around the 12th century (although no definitive record exists), and originated from its de-annexation (in 1120) from the neighbouring parish of Castelo Viegas.

== Geography ==
The civil parish is located along the southern border of the municipality of Coimbra, with the municipality of Condeixa-a-Nova (civil parish of Bem da Fé and Vila Seca). Its municipal neighbours include the parishes of Almalaguês (to the southeast), Castelo Viegas (to the northeast), Santa Clara (in the north), Antanhol (in the northwest), and Cernache (in the southwest).

Situated on a hilltop plateau overlooking the Mondego River, the region is marked by limestone hills covered in pine forests, dispersed by vineyards.

By the end of the 20th century, the growth of the parish originated in its proximity to Coimbra; the resident population in 1981 was 1,714, grew slightly to 1,886 (in 1991), reaching approximately 2,200 inhabitants by 1998.

== Architecture ==
- Chapel of Abrunheira (Portuguese: Capela de Abrunheira)
- Chapel of Carvalhais de Baixo (Portuguese: Capela de Carvalhais de Baixo)
- Chapel of Santo Amaro (Portuguese: Capela de Santo Amaro)
- Chapel of Palheira (Portuguese: Capelinha da Palheira)
- Chapel of Vale de Cantaro (Portuguese: Capela de Vale de Cantaro)
- Church of Nossa Senhora da Conceição (Portuguese: Igreja de Nossa Senhora da Conceição)
- Church of Palheira (Portuguese: Igreja de Palheira)
- Cross of Abrunheira (Portuguese: Cruzeiro de Abrunheira)
- Cross of Assafarge (Portuguese: Cruzeiro de Assafarge)
