= Jorge Velosa =

Jorge Luis Velosa Ruiz (born October 6, 1949) is a Colombian singer-songwriter, professor, actor, and writer, recognized as one of the leading exponents and initiators of carranguera music.

Graduated from the National University of Colombia as a veterinary physician, Velosa chose to fully dedicate himself to music and literature with a carranguero flavor.

== Early life and education ==
Jorge Luis Velosa Ruiz was born on October 6, 1949, in Ráquira, a municipality in the Boyacá department, Colombia. From his childhood, he was surrounded by rural and peasant traditions that would later influence his artistic career. He grew up in a modest family that greatly valued music and the customs of their region.

Before fully dedicating himself to music, Velosa showed great interest in studies. He moved to Bogotá to continue his higher education, where he obtained the title of veterinary physician from the National University of Colombia. Although he worked as a veterinarian, he never abandoned his passion for music, which would eventually become his true vocation.

== Career ==
In the 1970s, while working as a veterinarian, Velosa began to investigate the potential of peasant music as a means to express the culture and traditions of his homeland. His interest in folklore drove him to experiment with carranga, a musical genre that blends traditional Andean rhythms with humorous, social, and poetic lyrics that tell the everyday life of Colombian peasants.

In 1977, Velosa founded the musical group Los Carrangueros de Ráquira along with José Luis "El Chato" Lagos, Jorge González, and Ramiro Zambrano. With this group, he succeeded in consolidating carranga as a distinctive genre within Colombian music. Los Carrangueros made popular emblematic songs such as "La cucharita," "Julia, Julia, Julia," and "La china que yo tenía," which resonated deeply among peasants and also among urban audiences who appreciated the authenticity of this musical style.

== Discography ==
=== Los Carrangueros de Ráquira (1979–1992) ===
- Javier Moreno Forero* – requinto, vocals
- Jorge Luis Velosa* – vocals, riolina, guacharaca
- Félix Ramiro Zambrano* – marcante guitar
- Javier Apráez* - tiple

Album	Year	Record label
Los Carrangueros de Ráquira	1980	Fondo Musical
¡Viva quien toca!	1981	Fondo Musical
Así es la vida	1982	Fondo Musical

=== Jorge Velosa y Los Hermanos Torres (First Stage: 1984-1988) ===
- Jorge Velosa* – vocals, birimbao, guacharaca, riolina
- Delio Torres Ariza* – requinto, vocals
- Argemiro Torres Ariza* – guitar
- Juan de Jesús Torres Camacho* – Tiple

Album	Year	Record label
Pa’ los pies y el corazón	1984	FM Discos
Con alma, vida y sombrero	1985	FM Discos
Entre chiste y chanza	1986	FM Discos
Alegría carranguera	1987	FM Discos
El que canta sus penas espanta	1988	FM Discos

=== Jorge Velosa y Los Hermanos Torres (Second Stage: 1989) ===
- Jorge Velosa* – vocals, guacharaca
- Delio Torres* – requinto, tiple, cuatro, clave, vocals
- Argemiro Torres* – guitar
- Francisco Aristizábal* – bongó

Album	Year	Record label
A ojo cerrado	1989	FM Discos

=== Jorge Velosa y Los Hermanos Torres (Third Stage: 1990) ===
- Jorge Velosa* – vocals, guacharaca, riolina
- Delio Torres* – requinto, vocals
- Jairo Rincón Gómez* – Tiple, vocals
- Argemiro Torres* – guitar, vocals

Album	Year	Record label
De mil amores	1990	FM Discos

=== Velosa y Los Carrangueros (First Stage: 1992) ===
- Jorge Velosa* – vocals, guacharaca, harmonica
- Delio Torres* – requinto, vocals
- Jairo Rincón Gómez* – Tiple
- José Luis Posada Buitrago* – Guitar

Album	Year	Record label
Harina de otro costal	1992	Fuentes

=== Velosa y Los Carrangueros (Second Stage: 1993) ===
- Jorge Velosa* – vocals, guacharaca, harmonica
- Delio Torres* – requinto, vocals
- José Luis Posada Buitrago* – Guitar
- Jorge Eliecer González Virviescas* – Tiple

Album	Year	Record label
Sobando la pita	1993	Fuentes

=== Velosa y Los Carrangueros (Third Stage: 1994-1995) ===
- Jorge Velosa* – vocals, guacharaca
- Luis Alberto Aljure Lis* – Tiple, bandola llanera, vocals
- José Luis Posada Buitrago* – Guitar
- Jorge González Virviescas* – Requinto, vocals

Album	Year	Record label
Revolando en cuadro	1994	Fuentes
Marcando calavera	1996	Fuentes

=== Velosa y Los Carrangueros (Fourth Stage: 1996-2003) ===
- Jorge Velosa* – vocals, guacharaca, harmonica
- Luis Alberto Aljure Lis* – Tiple, tambor, vocals
- Jorge González Virviescas* – Requinto, vocals
- José Fernando Rivas Gómez* – Guitar, vocals

Album	Year	Record label
En cantos verdes	1998	Fuentes
Patiboliando	2002	MTM
Lero, Lero, Candelero	2003	MTM

=== Velosa y Los Carrangueros (Fifth Stage: 2004-2020) ===
- Jorge Velosa* – vocals, riolina, guacharaca
- Jorge González Virviescas* – requinto, vocals
- José Fernando Rivas* – guitar, electric guitar, vocals
- Manuel Cortés González* – Tiple, vocals

Album	Year	Record label
Surungusungo	2005	MTM
Carranga Sinfónica	2011	MTM

=== Jorge Velosa y Los Carrangueros del 25 (2024-Current) ===
- Jorge Velosa* – vocals, riolina, guacharaca
- Marco Villarreal* – requinto
- Gabriel Chaparro* – guitar
- Angélica Fonseca* – Tiple

Album	Year	Record label
El carrango y la carranga (Song)	2024	NMC

=== Compilations ===
Compilation	Year	Record label
Las clásicas con Los Hermanos Torres y Los Carrangueros de Ráquira	1990	FM
Una historia carranguera	2000	FM
Historia Musical del Carranguero Mayor	2001	Fuentes

== Nominations and Awards ==
Year	Nominated by	Award or Category	Result
1995	Premio Nacional de Cultura "Luis A. Calvo"	Best Traditional Music Artist	Winner
2000	Premio de la Música Colombia	Best Carranga Album	Winner
2001	Latin Grammy Awards	Best Folk Music Album	Nominated
2010	Premio a la Excelencia Musical	Recognition for Cultural Contribution	Winner
2015	Viña del Mar Festival	Silver Gaviota (Best International Artist)	Winner
2018	Order of Boyacá	Recognition for Contribution to Traditional Music	Winner
2002	Billboard Latin Music Awards	Best Folk Music Album	Nominated
2010	Shock Awards	Best Traditional Music Song	Nominated
2014	Latin Music Awards	Best Carranga Artist of the Year	Nominated
2016	Caribbean Music Award	Best Traditional Music Artist	Nominated

== Recognitions ==
Year	Recognition	Awarded by
1997	Order of Freedom	Awarded by the Department of Boyacá in recognition of his cultural contribution.
2000	Children's Song in Bolivia	One of his children's songs was officially chosen to aid in the teaching of Spanish in indigenous communities of Bolivia.
No specified	National Excellence in Arts and Sciences Award	Awarded by the National University of Colombia and its Alumni Association in recognition of his career.
2008	Gonzalo Suárez Rendón Decoration (Grand Gold Collar)	Received by the Mayor of Tunja on Farmers' Day, recognizing his cultural work.
1994	Baptism of Frog Species	Biologist John Lynch named two frog species in his honor: Pristimantis carranguerorum and Pristimantis jorgevelosai, belonging to the Strabomantidae family.
2012	Honorary Doctorate (National University of Colombia)	Received in recognition of his cultural and artistic contribution.
2023	Honorary Doctorate in Language and Culture (UPTC)	Awarded by the Pedagogical and Technological University of Colombia (UPTC) in recognition of his impact on culture and language.

== Filmography ==
Year	Title	Character	First Broadcast
1982	Don Chinche	Florentino Bautista 'don Floro'	Cadena Uno (1987-1992) / RTVC PLAY Streaming Platform
1987–1992	Romeo y Buseta	Trino Epaminondas Tuta	Cadena Uno (1987-1992) / RTVC PLAY Streaming Platform
1988	Sumercé Estéreo	José del Carmen Romero / Trino Epaminondas Tuta	Radio Station
1993–1994	Los Tuta	Trino Epaminondas Tuta	Señal Colombia (1993-1994) / RTVC PLAY Streaming Platform

== Literature ==
Year	Title	Publisher
1983	La cucharita y no sé qué más: historias para cantar	Carlos Valencia Editores
2021	El convite de los animales	Editorial Monigote
2023	Abuelo de pájaro	Editorial Monigote
2024	Historiando mi cantar. Un viaje por la carranga	Editorial Monigote

- Sonidos Colombianos (Realización: José Perilla). Conversatorio con Velosa y Los Carrangueros. Radio Nacional (RTVC), 22 de octubre de 2009.
