= Barco, Covilhã =

Barco
- Civil parish
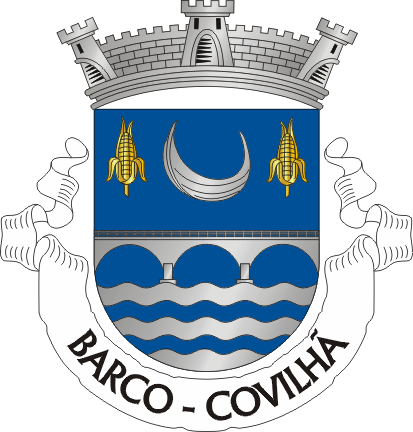
- Coat of arms

- Location in Portugal
- Coordinates: 40.173303°N 7.610077°W
- Country: Portugal
- Region: Centro
- Intermunic. comm.: Beiras e Serra da Estrela
- District: Castelo Branco
- Municipality: Covilhã
- Disbanded: 2013

Population (2011)
  - Total: 473
- Time zone: UTC+00:00 (WET)
  - Summer (DST): UTC+01:00 (WEST)
- Postal code: 6215

Barco is a village and a former civil parish in the municipality of Covilhã, Castelo Branco District, Portugal. In 2013, the parish merged into the new parish Barco e Coutada. It is about 5 kilometres (3.1 mi) northwest of Fundão. The village, in a fertile river valley settled since Roman times, depends mainly on agriculture and has a declining population.

== Location and history ==
Barco is on the north bank of the Zêzere River, which flows between the Serra da Estrela and Serra da Gardunha ranges. The name, which means "boat", refers to a ferry that operated across the river at this point. The region is fertile and accessible via the river, and has been settled for many years. There are traces of a Roman camp on Mount Argemela, across the river from the town. Tradition says the camp was built to defend against the great Lusitanian warrior Viriathus.

Barco is not mentioned in the Inquirições (Inquiries) of 1288, although it is known to have existed at that time. The parish of Barco was established by the 15th century, when it was split off from the priory of St. Silvestre da Covilhã and given its own priest. Even before this, there was a small chapel dedicated to Saint Simon the Zealot. Until the 19th century the parish was called St. Simon, after which it assumed the common name of Barco. Saint Simon was said to have been martyred by being sawed in half, and the emblem of the parish is a saw.

Between 1860 and 1950 the parish saw rapid population growth. The census of 1878 gave Barco a population of 923, of whom 429 were male and 494 female, in 234 dwellings. By 1950 there were 1,800 people. Since then the population has declined steadily. In 2011 Barco had a population of just 473.

== Economy and culture ==
Until recently wolfram and tin were mined in the parish. The Mina da Argemela, a tin mine that was abandoned around 1960, is located near Barco. Economic activities include trade, industry, agriculture and construction. Most people work in agriculture, growing maize, beans, olives and rye. Local gastronomical specialties include Borelhões, sausages, river fish and wild boar. Religion plays an important role in local culture, as shown by the many small shrines one sees in the countryside. Festivals include St. Simon (28 October), San Sebastian (4th Sunday of August), St John (June 23) and Our Lady of Fatima (May 30).

== Administration ==
Barco has always been part of Covilhã. There was some uncertainty about the extent of its territory, now 1,316 hectares (3,250 acres). The boundary between Barco and the neighboring parish of Peso was only defined on 4 October 1894. From 1872 to 1984 the parish of Coutada was attached to Barco. It was then made a separate parish. In 2013 Barco was again merged with the parish of Coutada to form the parish of União das Freguesias de Barco e Coutada.
