= Foz do Arelho =

- Civil parish
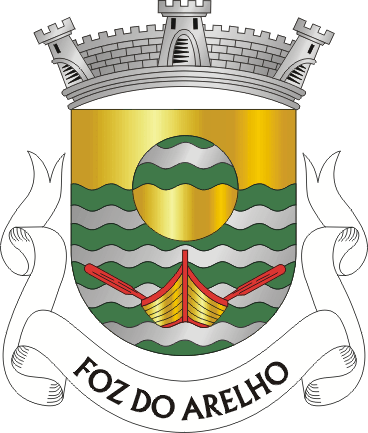
- Coat of arms

- Location in Portugal
- Coordinates: 39.431°N 9.226°W
- Country: Portugal
- Region: Oeste e Vale do Tejo
- Intermunic. comm.: Oeste
- District: Leiria
- Municipality: Caldas da Rainha

Area
  - Total: 9.62 km^{2} (3.71 sq mi)

Population (2011)
  - Total: 1,339
  - Density: 139/km^{2} (360/sq mi)
- Time zone: UTC+00:00 (WET)
  - Summer (DST): UTC+01:00 (WEST)
- Website: http://www.jf-fozdoarelho.pt

Foz do Arelho is one of twelve civil parishes (freguesias) in the municipality of Caldas da Rainha, Portugal. The population in 2011 was 1,339, in an area of 9.62 km^{2}.

== Geographic situation ==
Foz do Arelho is located 8 km west of Caldas da Rainha, in the northwest end of the council, and is limited north by the Atlantic Ocean and by the parish of Serra do Bouro. By South is delimited by the ocean basin of Lagoa de Óbidos (Óbidos Lagoon) and the parish of Nadadouro. East by the limits between the parishes of Serra do Bouro and Nadadouro and West by the ocean basin of Lagoa de Óbidos and the Atlantic Ocean.

== History ==
Foz do Arelho started as being a small village belonging to the parish of Serra do Bouro, and was promoted to the category of parish in July the 5th, 1919. As far as it can be remembered, Foz do Arelho was always a seasonal vacation resort, chosen by the elite families. Worthy of notice, is the wealthy businessman Francisco Almeida Grandela, which promoted several local activities, such as schools, etc. which helped to develop the region, and increased the life-quality of the local inhabitants.

== Area and demography ==
The parish of Foz do Arelho as a total area of 9.62 square kilometres (3.71 sq mi) in which live 1,339 inhabitants. Most of the local inhabitants work in industry and services in Caldas da Rainha, but there is also a considerable number dedicated to touristy activities, seafood fishing (bivalve molluscs), and agriculture.

== Landmarks ==
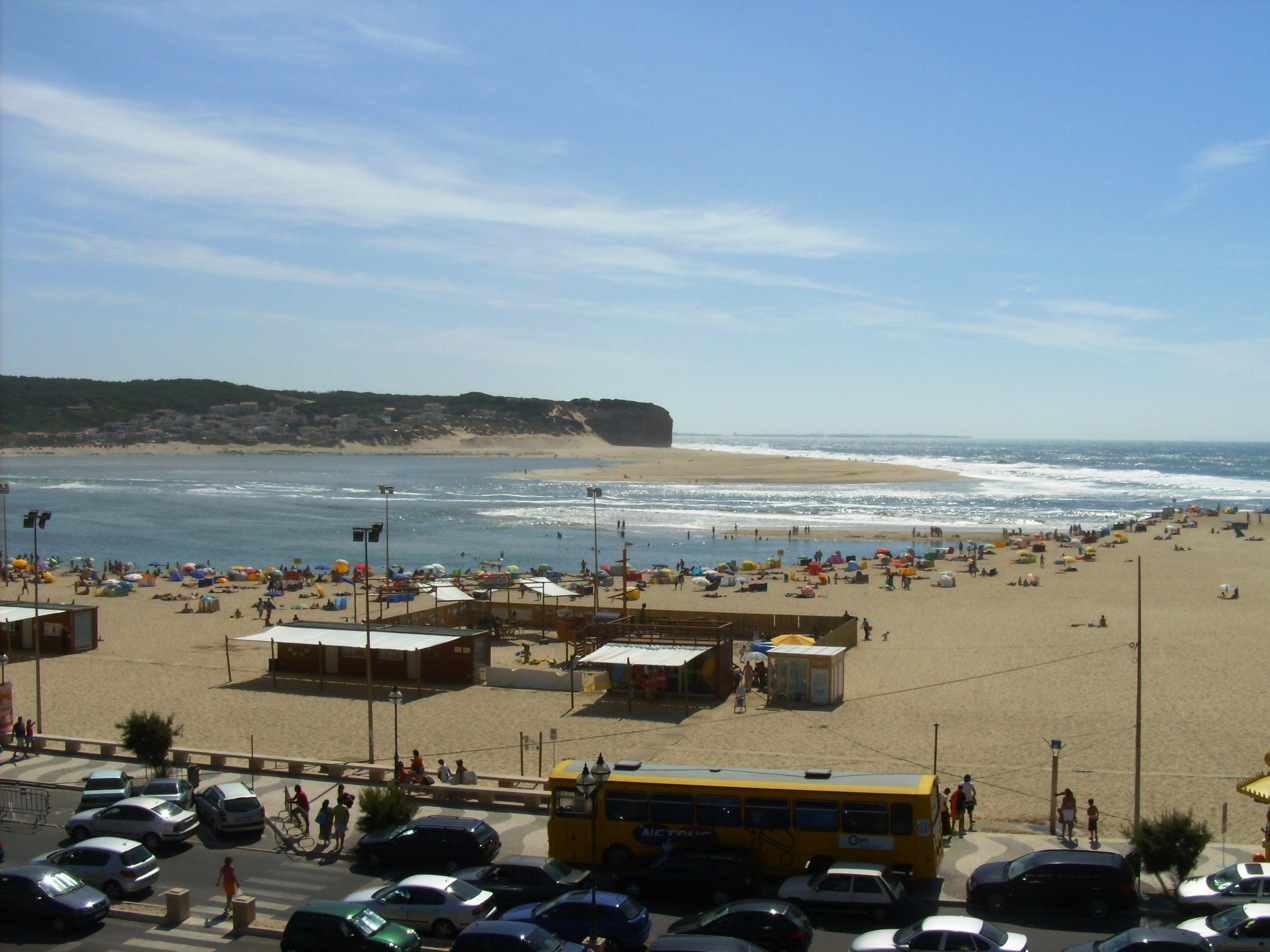
A view of the beach at Foz do Arelho

Quinta de Nossa Senhora de Guadalupe is an ancient manor house and farm, dated back to the 16th century. It includes a chapel, built in 1580 which can be seen, engraved in stone over the main entrance door, the chapel also has a stone bearing the "Medeiros" arms. Inside there is a polychromatic wood sculpture, dated back to the 16th century, representing N. Sra. do Carmo.

Foz do Arelho has several magnificent beach spots between the confluence of lagoa de Óbidos and the Atlantic Ocean. One can choose between swimming and sailing in the calm warm waters of the salt water lagoon, or surf and swim in the colder waters of the Atlantic.

== Watersport ==
With miles of coastline and the stunning waters of Óbidos lagoon, the Silver Coast is heaven for watersport enthusiasts. Surfing is the major activity but it is not the only one. With its mild climate and good winds, there is something here for almost every type of watersport.

The inland waters of Óbidos lagoon provide a sheltered location for sailors of all abilities. There is a sailing centre, Escola de Vela da Lagoa, on the Foz do Arelho side which caters for experienced sailors by providing a range of equipment for rental, and beginners through its sailing schools. Here it is possible to learn a watersport such as windsurfing, kitesurfing, sailing (including catamarans), canoeing, wakeboarding and water skiing, all in a beautiful landscape where forests roll down to the water's edge and the Atlantic pounds on beaches at the entrance to the lagoon. For those who are expert and daring enough to venture out into the waves, the lagoon offers an ideal launching place and a safe harbour to return to.

== Real estate pressure and degradation of the coastal environment ==
For several years now, along the coast, and particularly in Foz do Arhelo, developers with little regard for the environment, culture, and history of the country have been acquiring land to develop large-scale golf courses and prefabricated buildings. They are erecting, for example, a significant number of standardized houses that disregard traditional Portuguese architectural styles.

Besides their significant environmental impact, such as deforestation, these projects are leading to the gradual disfigurement of charming coastal villages typical of Portugal. In the long term, this transformation risks negatively and permanently affecting the country's tourist appeal, and consequently, the major economic benefits that tourism generates. By becoming commonplace and losing its identity, Portugal is thus exposing itself to a lasting loss of its attractiveness.
