= Coimbra (intermunicipal community) =

- Intermunicipal community
- Logo

- Coordinates: 40.21°N 8.42°W
- Country: Portugal
- Region: Central Portugal
- Established: 2013
- Seat: Coimbra
- Municipalities: 19

Area
  - Total: 4,335.57 km^{2} (1,673.97 sq mi)

Population (2011)
  - Total: 460,139
  - Density: 106.131/km^{2} (274.878/sq mi)
- Time zone: UTC+00:00 (WET)
  - Summer (DST): UTC+01:00 (WEST)
- Website: www.cim-regiaodecoimbra.pt

Coimbra (Portuguese pronunciation: [ʁɨʒiˈɐ̃w dɨ kuˈĩbɾɐ]) is an intermunicipal community of Portugal. It was created in October 2013, replacing the previously existing Greater Metropolitan Area of Coimbra. Since 2015, it is also a NUTS3 subregion of Centro region, that covers the same area as the intermunicipal community. The main city and seat of the intermunicipal community is Coimbra. The population in 2011 was 460,139, in an area of 4,335.57 km².

== Municipalities ==
The intermunicipal community of Região de Coimbra consists of 19 municipalities:

Municipality	Population (2011)	Area (km²)
Arganil	12,145	332.84
Cantanhede	36,595	390.88
Coimbra	143,396	319.40
Condeixa-a-Nova	17,078	138.67
Figueira da Foz	62,125	379.05
Góis	4,260	263.30
Lousã	17,604	138.40
Mealhada	20,428	110.66
Mira	12,465	124.03
Miranda do Corvo	13,098	126.38
Montemor-o-Velho	26,171	228.96
Mortágua	9,607	251.18
Oliveira do Hospital	20,855	234.52
Pampilhosa da Serra	4,481	396.46
Penacova	15,251	216.73
Penela	5,983	134.80
Soure	19,245	265.06
Tábua	12,071	199.79
Vila Nova de Poiares	7,281	84.45
Total	460,139	4,335.57

The territory of the Região de Coimbra equals that of the former Coimbra District, enlarged with the municipalities Mealhada (Aveiro district) and Mortágua (Viseu district).

== Cities within Coimbra Region ==
The main cities are Cantanhede, Coimbra (chief city), Figueira da Foz, Mealhada, Oliveira do Hospital. The principal harbour is in Figueira da Foz.
