= Queima das Fitas =

Student celebration in Portugal

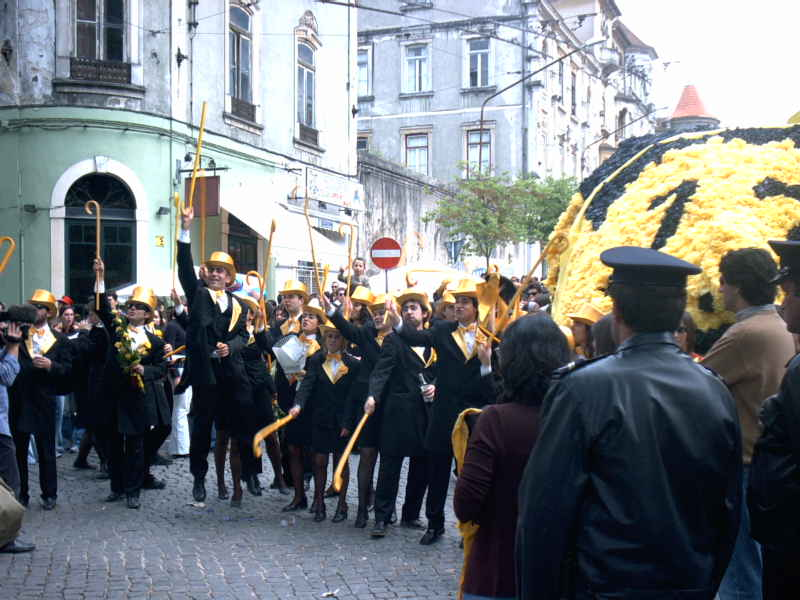
Coimbra's Queima das Fitas Parade (image depicting nearly-graduated students of the Faculty of Medicine of the University of Coimbra and their decorated float)

The Queima das Fitas (Portuguese for Ribbon Burning) is a traditional festivity of the students of some Portuguese universities, organized originally by the students of the University of Coimbra.

== History ==
Although student traditions and student lore in Portugal are much older and include features like the Praxe and the Latada, the first Queima das Fitas, or the ceremonial burning of the ribbons, was organized by the students of the University of Coimbra in the 1850s. The university is the oldest university of the country, and for many centuries it was the only one in Portugal.

== Coimbra ==
Coimbra's Queima das Fitas, the oldest and most famous, is organized by a students' commission formed by members of the students' union Associação Académica de Coimbra. Celebrating the end of graduation courses, symbolized by the ritual burning of the ribbons representing each faculty of the University of Coimbra (UC), it takes place at the second semester (starts on the first Friday of May at 00:00), being among the biggest student festivities in Europe. It lasts for eight days, one for each of UC's faculties: Humanities, Law, Medicine, Sciences and Technology, Pharmacy, Economics, Psychology and Education Sciences and Sports Sciences and Physical Education. During this period, a series of concerts and performances are held, turning Coimbra in a lively and vibrant city. It also includes a parade of the university students, sport activities, gala ball, and many other public events and traditions, such as the historical nighttime student fado serenade (Serenata Monumental) which happens in the stairs of the Old Cathedral of Coimbra for a crowd of thousands of students, tourists and other spectators.

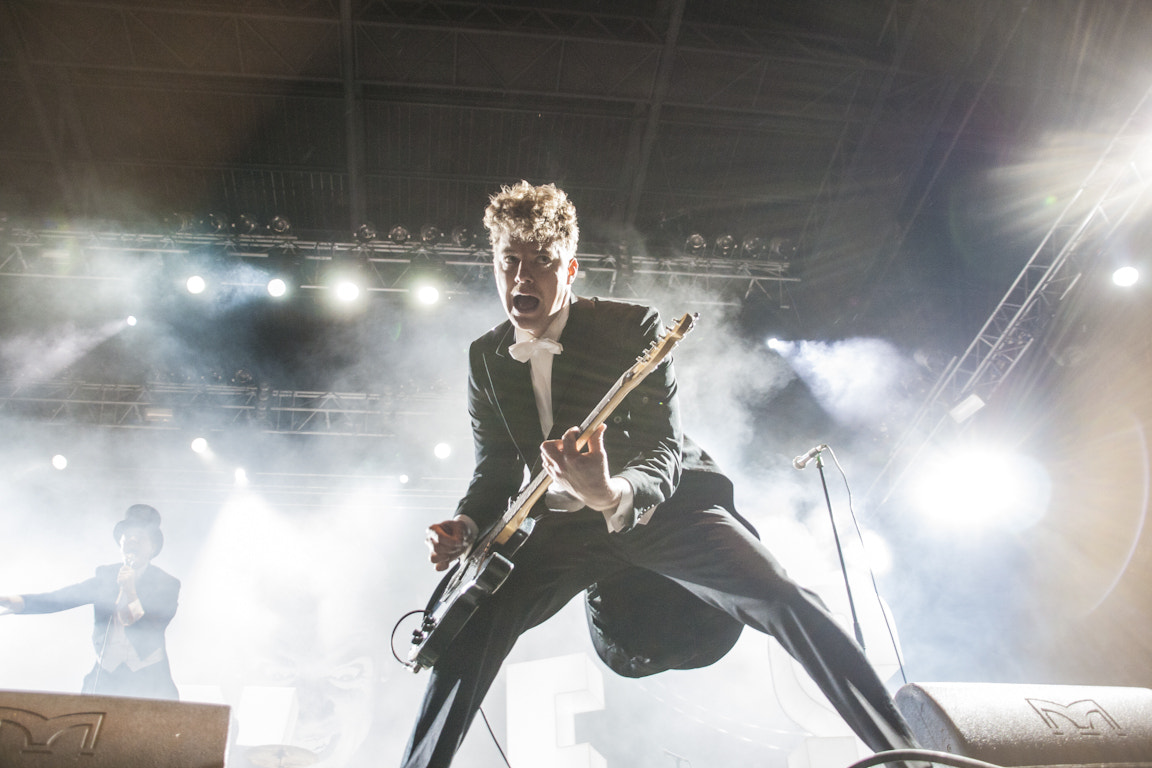
Swedish rock band The Hives at Queima das Fitas Festival of Coimbra in 2012.

The Ribbon Burning festivities are the big yearly celebration for the students and townspeople as well. The festivities run for a full week in May, beginning with the traditional nighttime fado serenade in the square of the Old Cathedral of Coimbra. The square is packed with students in their black capes and according to the ritual, studies are forgotten for a week of joy and all-night revelry. The high point of the festivities is the Cortejo, a parade beginning in Alta (upper Coimbra, the university historic centre and home to the Rector's Office and the famous University tower) with the graduating students burning their grelo. The parade progresses down the hills of the Alta towards the Baixa (downtown Coimbra, near the river) with dozens of elaborately decorated floats, each in the color of their respective faculties, carrying placards with ironic criticisms alluding to certain teachers, the educational system, national events and leaders. The parade is made up of thousands of "newly liberated" students set apart by their top hats and walking sticks.

After the outbreak in 1969 (April 17) of a crisis opposing the students to the dictatorial government of Marcelo Caetano, the festivities, as well as all other manifestations of the academic traditions, were suspended by the students as an act of protest (decided on May 8, 1969). This was known as the luto académico (Portuguese for academic mourning). However, between 1945 and 1974, there were three generations of militants of the radical right at the University of Coimbra and other universities, guided by a revolutionary nationalism partly influenced by the political sub-culture of European neofascism. The core of these radical students' struggle lay in an uncompromising defence of the Portuguese Empire in the days of the authoritarian regime.

The restarting of the celebrations took place in 1980, in the middle of an intense political controversy between left-wing students who opposed the celebration, and conservative students, who wanted to resume the practice. Such struggle took some time to heal, but the "Queima das Fitas" is now only contested by a small fringe of the more radical left-wing student movements.

Nowadays, the beer industry has become an important sponsor of Coimbra's Queima das Fitas, which has given still a wider projection to the festival, quite popular among young people from all around the country and even from Spain. During the festival's week groups of students from other universities, such as Lisbon or Porto, among thousands of other visitors, come to enjoy it. This growth in popularity has involved significant change to the festival, ever more professionalized, moving it a great distance away from its origins at the end of the 19th century. Students of more traditionalist or leftist sensibilities have occasionally decried this as an increased commercialization and commodification of their "mystique" and traditions.

== Lisbon ==
In Lisbon, higher education students enrolled at colleges and universities of Greater Lisbon area have also organized an Academic Week (Semana Académica) following many traditional events and cultural manifestations of the burning of the ribbons including an open-air Catholic mass for the students, a nighttime student serenade, a student parade through the streets of Lisbon and a music festival which have been always scheduled every year.

== Porto ==
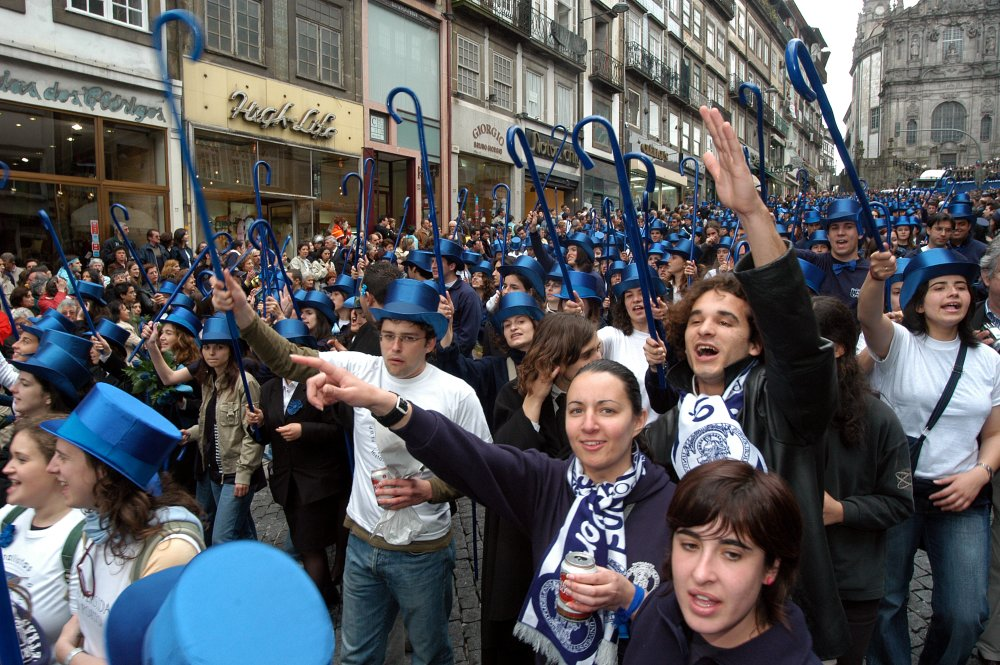
Porto's Queima das Fitas Parade (image depicting nearly-graduated students of the Faculty of Arts and Humanities of the University of Porto).

Porto's Queima das Fitas traces its origins to the beginning of the 1940s, and is a major event in the first week of May, before the beginning of the study period preceding the school year's last exams. The week comprehends 12 events, starting with the Monumental Serenata on Sunday, reaching its peak with the Cortejo Académico on Tuesday, when students from the universities and other higher education institutions of the city march through the downtown streets till they reach the city hall, where they are greeted (and greet back) by the mayor. During every night of the week a series of concerts takes place on the Queimódromo, next to the city's park; here it is also a tradition for the students in the second last year to erect small tents where alcoholic beverages are sold in order to finance the trip that takes place during the last year of their course.

During the parade through the city, different year students wear and play different parts: the graduates (the last year students) wear a top-hat and a walking-cane, both the colour of their faculty; the sophomores wear the traditional costume with their capes fully crossed; the freshmen (who after being greeted by the mayor become sophomores) wear funny/silly outfits (usually with carnival props related to baby-costumes) the same colour as their faculty, sing songs as loud as they can, do some sort of group dances, usually get hazed a little bit, and when they get to the Town Hall have to crawl on their hands and feet to walk by the mayor.

Porto's Queima was the first to reborn after the 1974 revolution. In 1978 there was a first try with a Mini-Queima, with only a few faculties involved and having to stand fierce hostility. In 1979 a "Traditional Queima" was put up by an almost clandestine organising committee, gathering students from most of the public faculties: Engineering, Medicine, Economics, Pharmacy, Arts and Humanities, and Science.

This team managed to frustrate the boycott efforts of left-wing students that opposed the celebration, and offered to the academy and the city the full traditional range of activities, that started with a Saturday to Sunday late night Serenade (starting at 00:01h), with traditional Coimbra Fado songs, in the courtyard of Porto's Cathedral. The programme included the blessing of the students' briefcases, decorated with ribbons ("Fitas") of the colour of each faculty, a Charity Day where all revenue from the selling of small cardboard briefcases with poems (some original and cheerfully offered by poet Pedro Homem de Mello) was given to a charity institution, several balls, rallye-paper, Garraiada (mock-up bullfight with small calves) and, specially, a huge parade that attracted an audience of more than 150,000 that blocked Porto's downtown for several hours, cheering the students and showing that the Queima had its place in the city's celebrations.

=== Murder of Marlon Correia ===
In early May 2013, Marlon Correia, who was 24 and a student of the Faculty of Sport of the University of Porto, was murdered in the Queimódromo. This happened as a gang who were heavily armed tried to rob the money from the ticket office and eventually killed Marlon with a firearm. This did not prevent the festival from happening that year and Marlon was honored in the so-called "Bênção das Pastas". The crime expires in 2035, and according to the order of the Public Ministry and over eight years, the authorities investigated violent groups, including the 'Grupo de Coimbrões' and the 'Grupo da Cruz de Pau-Matosinhos' and even arraigned six people as defendants. However, as of 2023, no suspects were sent to trial and the FAP, the student federation of Porto which organizes the Queima das Fitas in the city, was acquitted of paying indemnification to the parents of the victim because no wrongdoing or fault was found on the part of FAP as temporary employer and organizer of the event.

== See also ==
- Festa das Latas
- University of Coimbra
- Associação Académica de Coimbra
- Rádio Universidade de Coimbra (RUC)
- Praxe
- Academic Crisis
- Coimbra
- (in Portuguese) Queima das Fitas
