= Orfeon Académico de Coimbra =

Orfeon Académico de Coimbra (O.A.C.) is the oldest and one of the most famous academic choirs in Portugal. It was established in 1880 by the then University of Coimbra's law student João Arroio, with the name Sociedade Choral do Orpheon Académico.

It is one of the eight autonomous organizations of the Associação Académica de Coimbra. Traditionally, most members have been students of the University of Coimbra although there is no requirement of studying at the university to be able to join the choir. However, OAC still represents Coimbra's Praxe and traditions.

It is an internationally famous choir, and represents an important role in Portugal's musical evolution, including one of the most important schools of Fado de Coimbra, a unique type of Portuguese fado. The choir has recorded music for radio and LP, released a CD Orfeon Académico de Coimbra "cantando espalharei por toda a parte..." (the title is quote from Luís Vaz de Camões).

== See also ==
- Orfeon Académico de Coimbra - Portuguese link
- University of Coimbra
- Coimbra Academic Association
- Praxe
