= Coimbra Academic Association =

Students' union of the University of Coimbra, Portugal

The Associação Académica de Coimbra (AAC) is the students' union of the University of Coimbra (UC). Founded in Coimbra on November 3, 1887, it is the oldest students' union in Portugal. It is also the biggest Portuguese students' union belonging to an independent institution, since it represents all the students of its university, who gain automatic membership into the AAC as students of the University of Coimbra (25,580 students as of 2021).

In addition to several departments dedicated to culture and student life, ranging from theatre and musical groups to radio and cinematography, the AAC has several sports' departments (called sections) based in Coimbra. All teams and athletes of the AAC sports departments bear the same name and logo with black uniforms. This is one of the largest multi-sports clubs of Portugal. The Associação Académica de Coimbra - O.A.F., an autonomous football organization inside the AAC, houses one of its better known teams across Portugal due to a historical presence on the main Portuguese Football Championships and the popularity of football in the country. Despite that, the Associação Académica de Coimbra - S.F. (sports section) is also in operation as a student-only football team of AAC which has been playing in the lower, regional football leagues. In rugby (Portuguese Rugby Union Championship), volleyball (Portuguese Volleyball Championship) and basketball (Portuguese Basketball League (LCB)) top flight competitions, through the Associação Académica de Coimbra (rugby union), the Associação Académica de Coimbra (volleyball) and the Associação Académica de Coimbra (basketball) departments, the AAC has also been represented at the highest level in the Portuguese major competitions across its history, as well as in several olympic sports ranging from athletics to martial arts disciplines. The chess team has been Portuguese champion on several occasions.

== History ==
The Associação Académica de Coimbra was predated by several older student organisations, for example the Orfeon Académico de Coimbra (1880). This choir remains as an autonomous entity within the association. The Associação Académica was founded on the base of the student dramatic society, the Academia Dramática de Coimbra (1849-1887). The main mover was António Luís Gomes, a law student. In 1971, student protests against policies of the Estado Novo regime led to the Associação Académica being closed down, preceding a round of repression.

== Organization ==
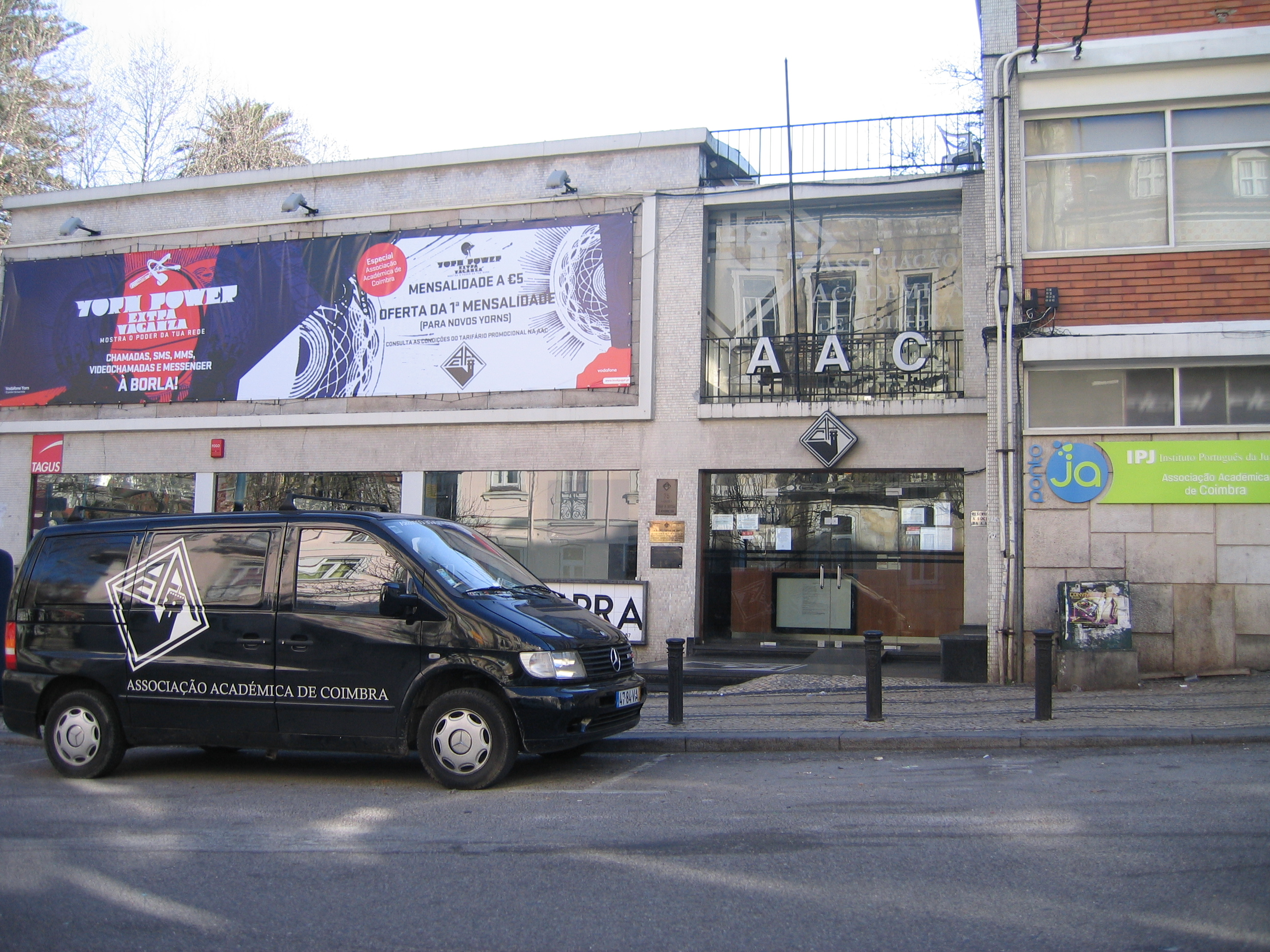
AAC main entrance in 2008, with one of the AAC vans parked outside the building.

The AAC is governed by a "D.G. - Direcção Geral" (Directorate-General, the main board) made up entirely of students of the University of Coimbra; yearly elections take place to name the members of this board, any student can sign up to be a candidate. All the students of UC are entitled to vote for the AAC board. The current president of the main board is João Assunção.

Since the late 1990s inside the AAC structure have been created several local student unions, representing courses, departments or sometimes faculties/colleges. Known as “Núcleos” (Portuguese for nucleus), these semi-independent unions have their own elected internal organs. All of them represent a major role in the AAC political, cultural, sportive and social life. In 2008 the AAC comprehended 25 of such unions, of which NEFLUC (Students union of the Faculty of Letters) is the biggest, representing nearly 3000 students.

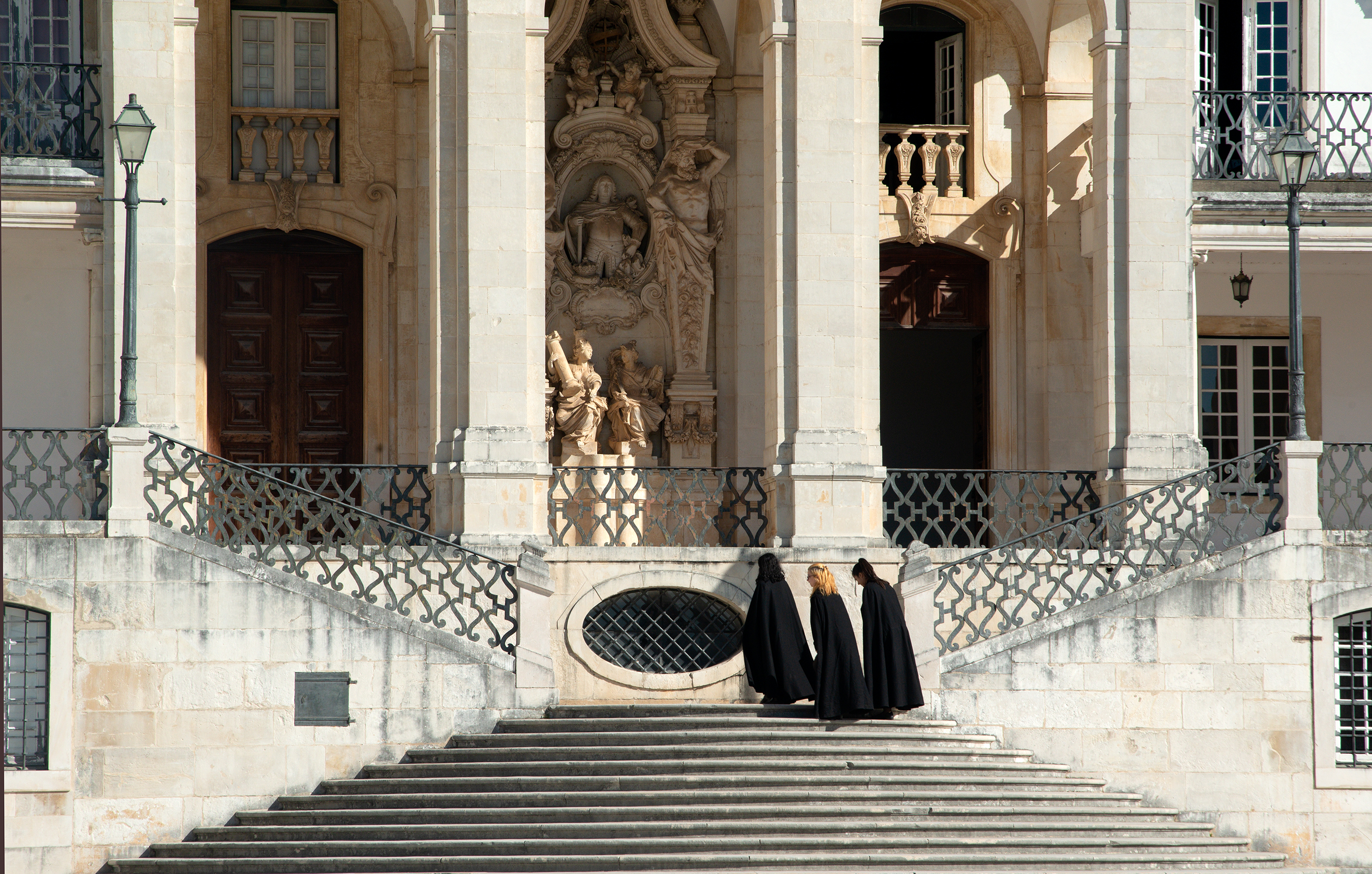
Students in robes (for the first week of the class year), University of Coimbra

The main building of the Coimbra's Academic Association was inaugurated in 1961 and holds the offices of many sports clubs (secções desportivas) and arts sections (secções culturais). There are also rehearsal halls, a medical centre, academic services, extensive indoor gardens, a theatre-cinema with approximately 1,000 seats (Teatro Académico de Gil Vicente), and a café–restaurant where many students meet up and enjoy a wide selection of foods. AAC is the umbrella organization for a number of autonomous entities, the organismos autónomos.

Some of its better known former members include Salgado Zenha, Manuel Alegre, António de Almeida Santos, Miguel Torga, António Nobre, Vergílio Ferreira, Zeca Afonso, and Adriano Correia de Oliveira.

In addition, the AAC is the organizing and regulating body of the typical student Praxe (Praxis) of the University of Coimbra (UC), a rich tradition of rituals and festivities organized by UC's students, for the students.

=== Sports sections ===
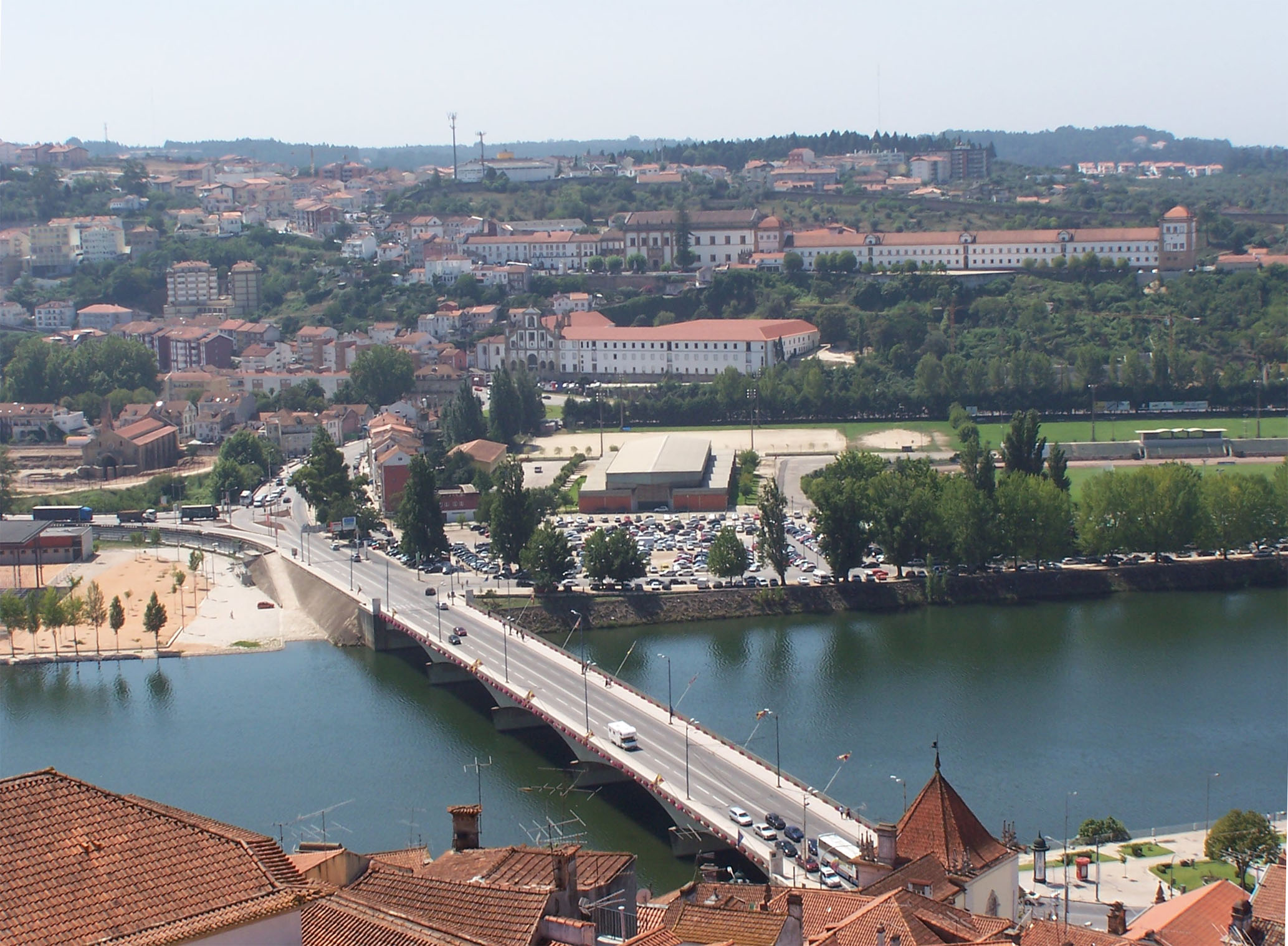
A view of the southern top of the University Stadium and Sports Complex of the University of Coimbra near the Mondego river.

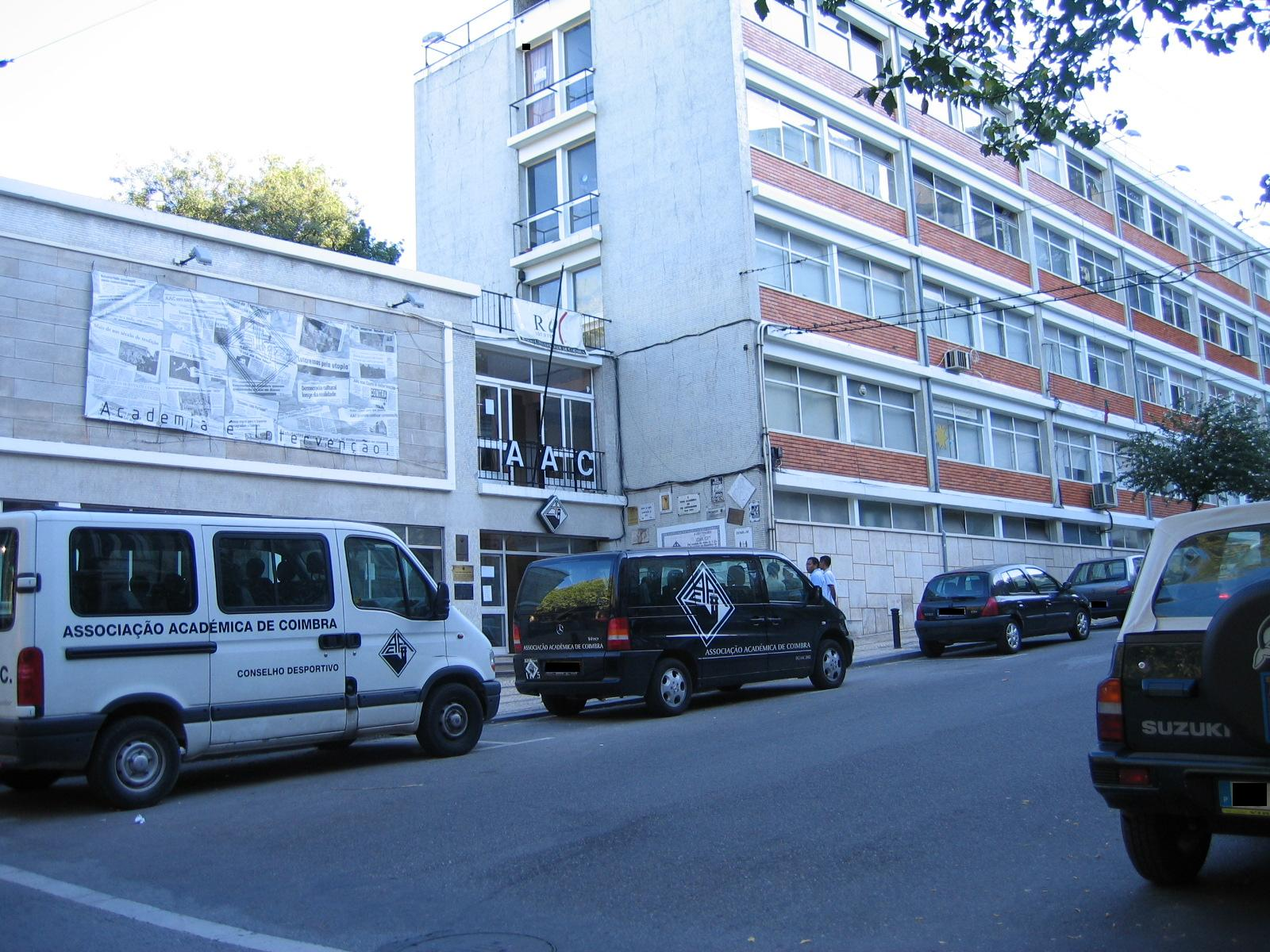
View of the main entrance and the main building of AAC in 2006. To the right, the building has the offices of dozens of sports departments (called sections; secções in Portuguese) and cultural organizations (also called sections) ranging from chess, several martial arts and diverse ball game sports to radio, cinema, philately, astronomy and theatre, among many others.

Many sports teams and athletes of the AAC sports sections have been regularly involved with major national and international sports clubs and competitions. The AAC sports sections, which are the sports departments of AAC, hold many of their training sessions and games in the University Stadium and Sports Complex of the University of Coimbra located in the Santa Clara area of the city, in the southern bank of the Mondego river. There is also the historical Campo de Santa Cruz close by the Pólo I campus of the University of Coimbra, the oldest campus of this university, which as facilities that include 2 fields for the practice of several sports events including football, rugby and baseball.

The AAC sports sections (sports departments) include:

- Archery
- Athletics
- Badminton
- Baseball since 1994.
- Basketball: is played at Pavilhão Multiusos de Coimbra. The team (Associação Académica de Coimbra - basketball) currently plays in the highest level of Portuguese basketball, the Portuguese Basketball Premier League.
- Body building
- Boxing
- Canoeing
- Chess
- Competitive swimming
- Fencing
- Football: Associação Académica de Coimbra - Secção de Futebol (AAC - SF)
- Gymnastics
- Handball
- Judo
- Karate
- Motorized sports
- Nautical sports
- Radio-controlled car
- Rink hockey
- Associação Académica de Coimbra (rugby union): The team has been a major contender in the Portuguese top level rugby union championship. They represented Portugal once at the European Challenge Cup, as an amateur side, for the season of 2004/05, being eliminated by Borders, from Scotland, after heavy losses of 3-98, home, and 3-107, away, in an aggregate of 6-205. Académica didn't attend the European Shield the same season. The Coimbra side had one of its players, Rui Cordeiro, in the Portugal national rugby union team which was present at the 2007 Rugby World Cup.
- Roller skating
- Sport fishing
- Taekwondo
- Tennis
- Volleyball: The team currently plays in the Portuguese Volleyball League A1.
- Weightlifting
- Wrestling

=== Arts sections ===
Among the Arts sections of the AAC, the Coimbra's University radio station is known for its unique profile, youthful attitude and avant-garde style. All cultural sections of AAC are open to the entire society, promoting events, workshops and courses, both for students and the city community.

AAC cultural sections include:

- Astronomy
- Cinematography: Centro de Estudos Cinematográficos
- Ecological Group: Founded in 1974, it is a place for debate, divulgation and intervention on ecological manners.
- Fado de Coimbra music
- Gastronomy
- Human rights
- Informatics
- Journalism: A Cabra (university newspaper)
- Philately
- Portuguese language and culture divulgation
- Radio: Rádio Universidade de Coimbra
- Student SOS - Phone line to support and help students with any kind of personal problems
- Television: TV-AAC
- Writing and Reading
- Yoga

=== Autonomous organisations ===
Besides the sports clubs and the arts sections of the Associação Académica de Coimbra, there are also independent organisations within the AAC, the Organismos Autónomos. Such as the above-mentioned Orfeon Académico de Coimbra (1880), which today represents the city of Coimbra and the university during its world tours.

The same applies to the professional football team of the AAC, the Associação Académica de Coimbra – O.A.F. (not to be confused with the Associação Académica de Coimbra - Secção de Futebol devoted to amateur football), usually known as "Académica" or "Briosa", which has a legally-binding link to the student association AAC and its university, the University of Coimbra. This team is amongst the top Portuguese football leagues and was created in 1887. It is a professional football club, established by the AAC and also part of the AAC as an independent club. The AAC football club was the first ever winner of the Portuguese Football Cup, in 1939.

Among the autonomous organisations of AAC there are also some prominent theatre groups with a vast curriculum of acclaimed performances and playing a critical part in the city's cultural life. AAC autonomous organisations include:

- Choral music: OAC - Orfeon Académico de Coimbra and CMUC - Coro Misto da Universidade de Coimbra
- Folk music and Ethnography: Grupo de Etnografia e Folclore da Academia de Coimbra
- Professional football team: Associação Académica de Coimbra - O.A.F.
- Music: Tuna Académica da Universidade de Coimbra
- Plastic arts: Círculo de Artes Plásticas de Coimbra
- Theatre: TEUC - Teatro dos Estudantes da Universidade de Coimbra and CITAC - Círculo de Iniciação Teatral da Academia de Coimbra

== Events ==
The AAC is also responsible for the organization of the Queima das Fitas, one of the biggest student festivals in Europe and a great event in the city. The Festa das Latas, a smaller-scale event is the freshman's week of the University of Coimbra, also organised by the AAC. The AAC is the official body of the traditional Praxe, a sort of students' rite of passage, created by students of the University of Coimbra, which has a code of conduct, the Código da Praxe), a book published within the students' union.

== The Symbol ==
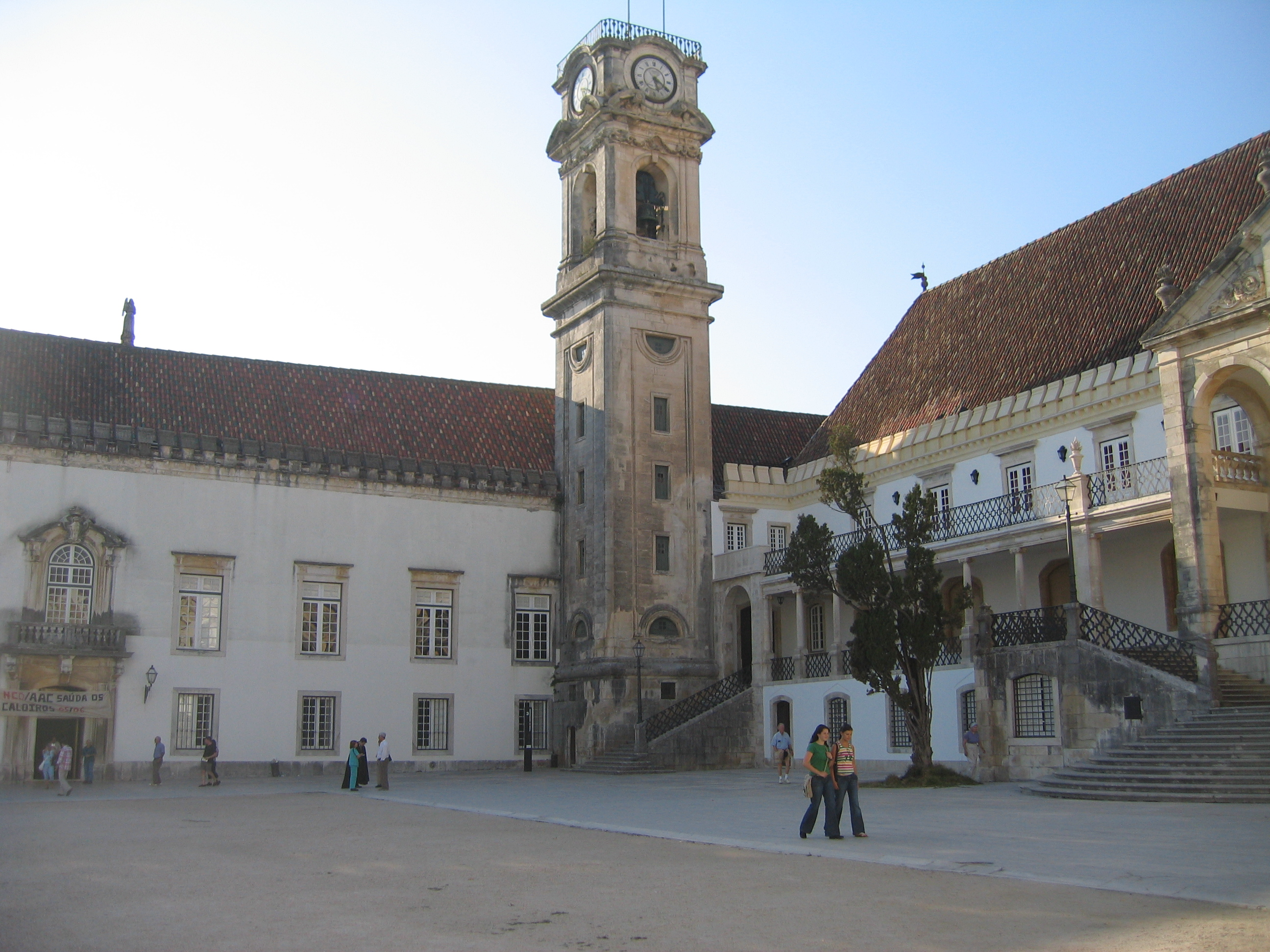
The tower of the University of Coimbra

Before the current logo, the AAC used to be represented by a black cape to reflect the university's traditional students' uniform. The AAC logo was created by Francisco Pimentel in 1927 by request of the AAC's Main board. The logo of the Associação Académica de Coimbra has a stylized drawing of the tower of the university and the acronym AAC.

The Tower of Coimbra's University is the city's «ex-libris» with its iconic bell. The tower's bell is known amongst the students as the cabra (she-goat). The tower is of Baroque style by the school of the German-born architect Ludovice who built it between 1728 and 1733. It is almost 34 metres high, and has a narrow and circular staircase which leads to a belvedere with remarkable views over the university, the historical part of the city centre and the river Mondego.

== AAC uniqueness ==
University of Coimbra's AAC is the biggest organization of its kind in Europe. It is also the oldest in Portugal.

Other similar students' unions in the country, such as (Associação Académica da Universidade de Lisboa) (University of Lisbon), Associação Académica da Universidade de Aveiro (University of Aveiro), Associação Académica da Universidade da Beira Interior (University of Beira Interior), Associação Académica da Universidade do Minho (Minho University), or Associação Académica da Universidade do Algarve (University of the Algarve), are smaller students' unions by number of associates because its universities have a smaller number of students or because the universities' student's aren't automatically members of the union, with a membership fee being required.

In other places in Portugal, there are many independent faculty, college, institute and school organizations of students from many mother-institutions (universities or polytechnical institutes) that are not representative of the whole mother-institution, being this fragmentation the reason for their smaller size, importance, and strength. There are also federations of students' unions comprising public and private, university and polytechnic independent and not related institutions from a city, like FAP - Federação Académica do Porto (from Porto) which is the largest students organization in the country, that do not represent a single university or polytechnic, but many independent federated students' unions from institutions of the most diverse kind.

== See also ==
- University of Coimbra
- Associação Académica de Coimbra - O.A.F., football
- Associação Académica de Coimbra - basketball
- Associação Académica de Coimbra - volleyball
- Associação Académica de Coimbra (rugby union)
- Rádio Universidade de Coimbra (RUC)

And:

- Queima das Fitas, student festival in Portuguese universities
- Praxe, student initiation rituals in Portuguese universities
- Academic Crisis 1962, government clampdown on Portuguese universities
- Coimbra the town
- Coimbra fado, the local version of the song genre
