= Chapel of São Miguel =

Chapel of the University of Coimbra in Coimbra, Portugal

Coordinates: 40.207414°N 8.42645°W

- São Miguel Chapel in Coimbra

Location
- Country: Portugal
- Interactive map of Chapel of São Miguel

São Miguel Chapel or Saint Michael's Chapel (Capela de São Miguel, also called "Capela da Universidade de Coimbra" - "Coimbra University Chapel") is a chapel of the University of Coimbra in Coimbra, Portugal, which was founded (at another location) in 1290. In architectural style, it is Manueline or Portuguese late Gothic.

The interior contains elaborate azulejo wall tiles, an altar with influences of Mannerism and an ornate Baroque organ.

The chapel was originally part of the Royal Palace of Coimbra which was acquired by the university from the royal family in 1597. It retained royal privilege even after the purchase.

== History ==
The current chapel replaced a small private chapel or oratory of the palace which was probably built in the 12th century.

The project belonged to Marcos Pires, who designed the naturalistic Manueline side door, although he died in 1521 and his work had to be finished by Diogo de Castilho. The entrance to the chapel is through a neo-classical door made by José de Carvalho in 1780. The current chapel was planned by Marco Pires between 1517 and 1522; he designed the Manueline side door, but died in 1521, with the work completed by Diogo de Castilho. Simão Ferreira made the lamp for this church in 1597 and the cup between 1601 and 1602. The tile floor dates to 1613. The painting on the ceiling, by Francisco F. de Araújo, was completed in the late 1600s.

In 1684 Manuel Ramos built the pulpit. In 1733 the chapel received its organ. In 1737, painter Gabriel Ferreira da Cunha added the "chinoiserie" (Chinese patterns) on the organ and in 1739 completed its construction. The organ, a gift of King John V of Portugal, is equipped with nearly 2,000 pipes.

The neo-classical door (entrance) was made by José de Carvalho in 1780.

== Uses ==
The chapel is consecrated and used to celebrate mass every Sunday.

It is also a tourist attraction of Coimbra's old university quarter. A choir, the Coro da Capela da Universidade de Coimbra, performs in the church. Although Coimbra University teaching and administrative staff has priority, São Miguel Chapel occasionally rents the space for Roman Catholic weddings and other events.

== Gallery ==
Manueline portal and side windows

Chancel with the high altar and side altars

High altar and gilded altarpiece

Rear gallery and organ viewed from the nave

Baroque organ

Painted ceiling with the Portuguese royal arms
