= Coimbra University Stadium =

Sports complex in Coimbra, Portugal

Coordinates: 40°12′22″N 8°26′05″W

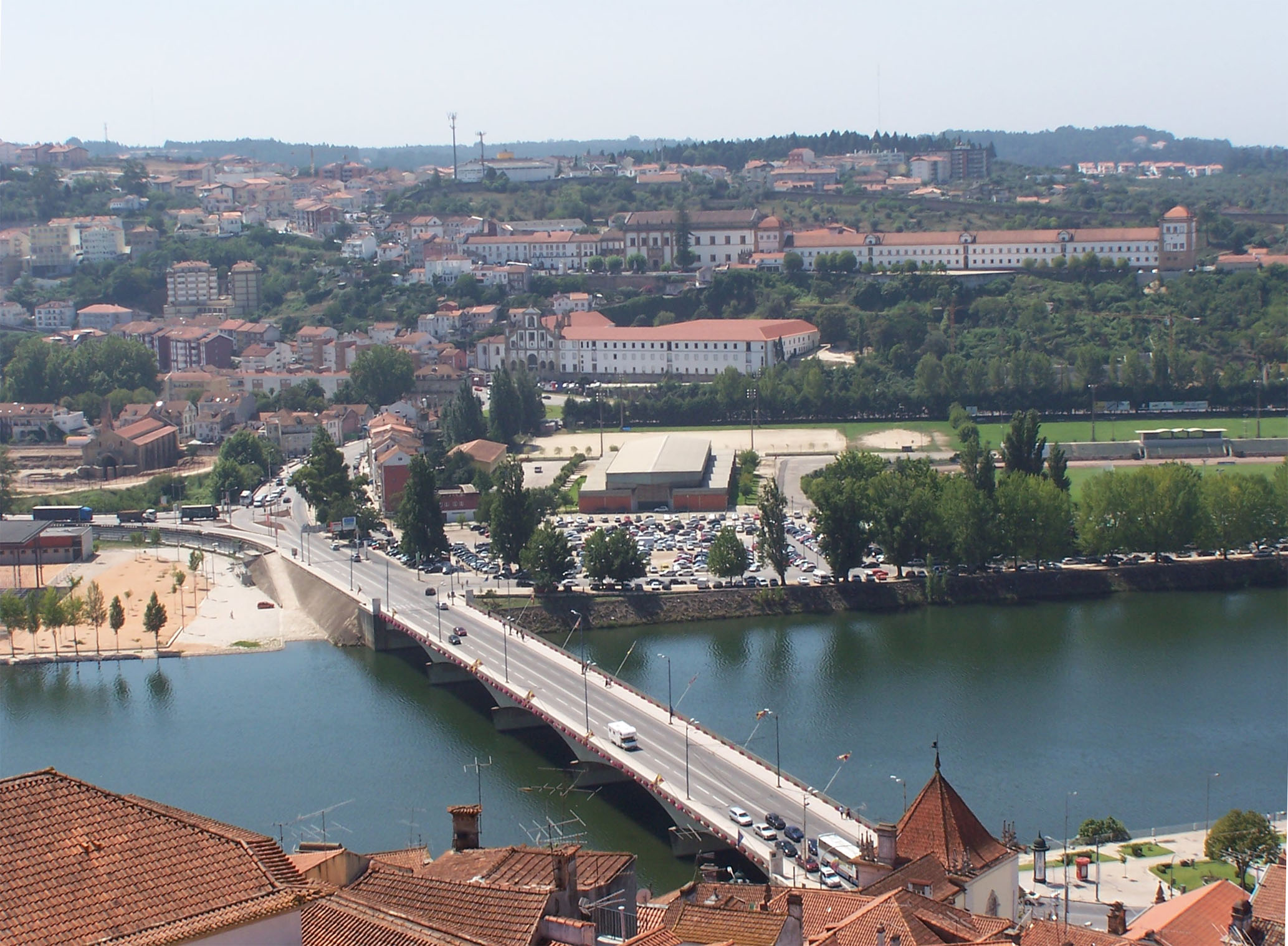
A view of the southern top of the Estádio Universitário de Coimbra sports complex near the river.

The Coimbra University Stadium (Portuguese: Estádio Universitário de Coimbra), or EUC, is an extensive sports complex of the University of Coimbra on Mondego's left bank, in Santa Clara parish, in the city of Coimbra, Portugal. The stadium was opened in 1963.

It has 2 football (soccer) fields, one of them with an athletics track, a rugby union field, gymnasiums, tennis courts, a Radio-Controlled car track, and two multisports pavilions for play indoor sports such as basketball, handball, rink hockey, and volleyball.

The Faculdade de Ciências do Desporto e Educação Física da Universidade de Coimbra, the sports sciences faculty of the University of Coimbra, is located there, and includes library and restaurant for the student community.

== See also ==
- Associação Académica de Coimbra
- University of Coimbra
