= João Arroio =

Portuguese composer

João Marcelino Arroio (or Arroyo; 4 October 1861, Porto — 18 May 1930, Colares (Sintra)) was a Portuguese composer. He is best known for his opera Amor de Perdição. He notably founded the Orfeon Académico de Coimbra in 1880.
