= Coimbra University Radio =

Coordinates: 40.2094°N 8.4213°W

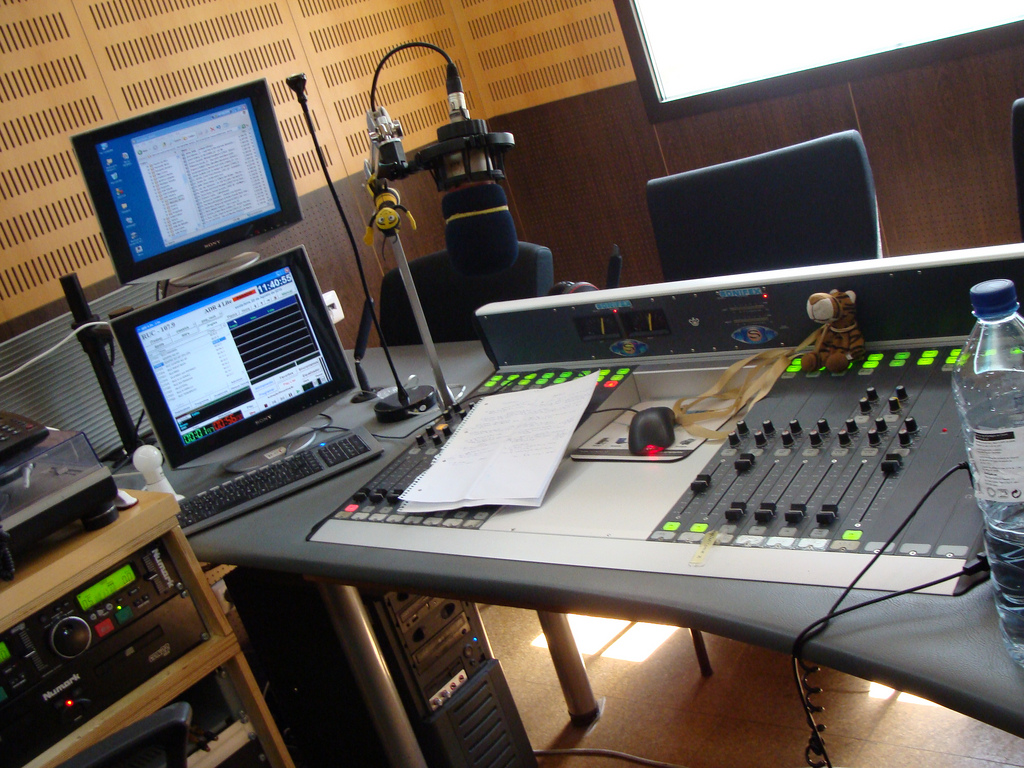
RUC main studio

Coimbra University Radio (Portuguese: Rádio Universidade de Coimbra - RUC) is a university radio station of the Coimbra Academic Association (students' union) of the University of Coimbra in Coimbra, Portugal.

It broadcasts on 107.9 FM (also broadcasts on-line). The Center of Experimental Radio was founded in the 1940s but it was only on 1 March 1986 that the radio obtained the authorization to broadcast on FM.

The studios and offices of this university radio station are located in the main building of the Associação Académica de Coimbra, in the city centre.

The radio gives courses in radio programming, technic and news, that students from the University of Coimbra and everybody else can join.

In 2002, RUC broadcaster José Braga attempted to break the Guinness world record for the longest DJ Marathon previously achieved by the Swedish Kristian Bartos with 100 hours, 3 minutes and 22 seconds. Braga failed the attempt with a time of 68 hours, 37 minutes and 18 seconds.

For its 25th anniversary, the radio hosted concerts of the indie Swedish band the Radio Dept., and later Eleanor Friedberger from the rock duo The Fiery Furnaces and the Welsh songwriter Euros Childs.
