= Praxe =

Student traditions in universities

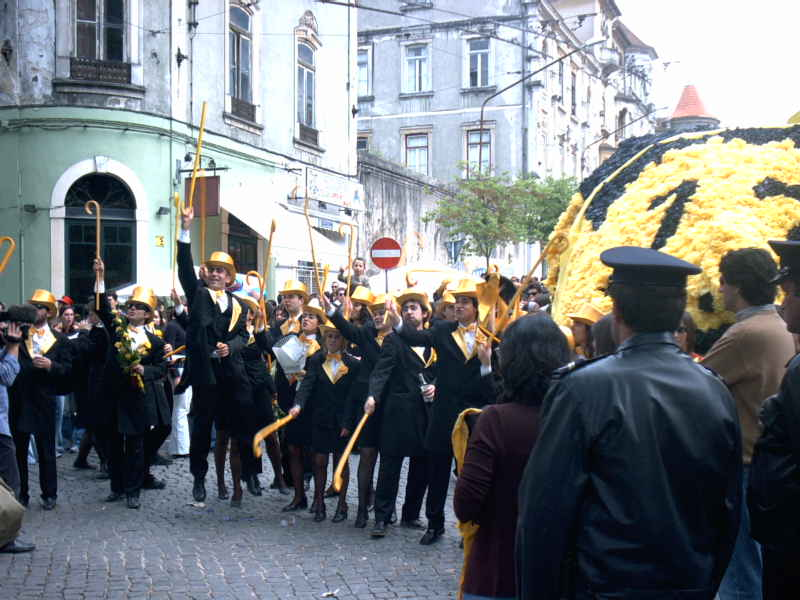
Coimbra's Queima das Fitas parade. Nearly graduated medicine (orthodontology in this particular case) students and their decorated float.

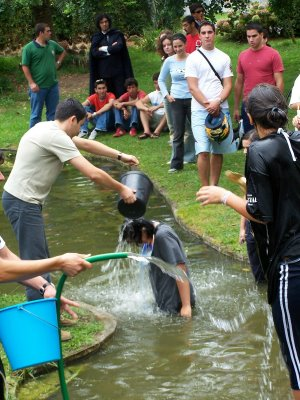
Freshman being "baptized" by older students

The Portuguese term praxe ([ˈpɾaʃɨ] derived from the Greek πρᾶξις, praxis), refers to the entirety of student traditions at universities, particularly the initiation rituals that freshmen undergo at some Portuguese institutions.

== Description ==
Praxe is practiced by various higher education institutions across Portugal. Notable examples include the Queima das Fitas and its parade (Cortejo da Queima), as well as the Festa das Latas and the Latada, where the freshmen walk through the streets with cans tied to their feet. Another tradition involves the ripping of the traditional academic suit when students complete their first cycle of studies. The origins of praxe date back to the 14th century, but it gained prominence in the 16th century under the name "Investidas" at the University of Coimbra, the oldest university in the country.

Praxe is intended to introduce freshmen to the university community and help them overcome social inhibitions. Tradition, ritual, humor, joy, and parody are central elements of praxe. Older students often create humorous situations and playful jokes involving freshmen, offering them a warm welcome through initiation rituals.

Praxe typically takes place without the formal consent of universities, meaning that students are primarily responsible for organizing and maintaining praxe groups. These groups, led by "veterans" (older students), plan activities, rituals, traditions, gatherings, trips, meals, parties, and more, often without any oversight or involvement from the school administration, faculty, or other academic associations.

In most Portuguese higher education institutions, male and female students participate in some gender-specific rituals to ensure dignity and respect. Most initiation rituals for freshmen are performed collectively to minimize opportunities for abuse. However, older students occasionally push praxe too far, turning initiation rituals, jokes, and traditions into acts of humiliation and violence, violating the established codes and values of praxe. Hazing became a controversial issue in Portugal in 2014, following the death of six students at Praia do Meco (Meco Beach) in Sesimbra in December 2013.

The President of the Associação Académica de Coimbra and the Dux Veteranorum of Coimbra (the governing body of Praxe in Coimbra) have described such incidents as a violation of its principles, supporting legal action against perpetrators. One of the mottos of Praxe is Dura Praxis Sed Praxis (Latin for "The Praxe is harsh, but it is the Praxe," akin to dura lex sed lex). These incidents have sparked criticism of Praxe and led to the formation of student organizations opposing it.

With the expansion of higher education institutions across Portugal in the last quarter of the 20th century, the concept of Praxe has evolved, varying from university to university. Coimbra and Porto claim to preserve the heritage of authentic academic traditions, often contrasting their practices with the newer customs adopted by younger universities and higher education institutions.

An increasing number of institutions now organize alternative initiation events for freshmen, focusing on solidarity and community service activities. This approach is known as "Solidarity Praxis" (Praxe Solidária).

== History ==
The roots of Praxe trace back to the 14th century, when it was practiced by the clergy, significantly influencing the design of the academic attire. However, Praxe gained recognition only in the 16th century, when it spread to Coimbra and was first named Investidas following the establishment of the university. From Coimbra, the tradition extended to Lisbon and Porto in the 19th century, as these cities gained access to higher education. Students who transferred closer to home brought Praxe and its customs with them, further spreading the tradition.

Praxe is widely recognized across Portugal and is practiced in higher education institutions of all types and origins throughout the country. As access to higher education expanded to more cities, the tradition continued to spread. Today, the rituals and customs of Praxe are replicated nationwide, with each university or institution developing its own specific practices. Additionally, some Praxe-related organizations have even achieved an international presence.

The ritual burning of the ribbons at Queima das Fitas, the tradition of ripping and tearing the academic attire of newly graduated students, the Festa das Latas with its Latada parade, the Cortejo da Queima parade at Queima das Fitas, among many other rituals, festivals, and traditions, are all events associated with Praxe.

== Academic outfit ==
Although Coimbra's academic outfit is the traditional one and considered the symbol of a Portuguese higher education student, some Portuguese institutions have their own distinct academic attire, which differs significantly from that of the ancient University of Coimbra. For example, this is the case with the outfits worn by students at the University of the Algarve and Minho University.

The academic outfit, known in Portuguese as "Traje Académico," consists of a cassock, black pants, a black straight tie or bowtie (if the bowtie is worn, the vest is excluded), a black vest with a back buckle, and a simple white shirt without motifs or cuff links, featuring buttons of the same color and a pocket on the left side. It is completed with black classical shoes and a straight black cloak for men. Women's outfits consist of a white straight shirt (similar to the men's, without cuff links), a black jacket with two pockets, a black skirt, a black tie, stockings, and low-heeled shoes.

The outfit, originally created for the students of the University of Coimbra, is a key part of praxe, symbolizing equality, respect, and humility. It originated from the attire worn by monks, reflecting the influence of the clergy on education, which lasted until the 18th century. The outfit maintained a very similar appearance to the original until the 19th century, when more significant changes occurred, such as the shortening of the cassock. By the end of the century, long pants had become a permanent feature.

There are several myths surrounding this outfit, such as the belief that the cloak should not be washed, as it represents the relinquishment of memories from academic life. This myth has been clarified by the Conselho de Veteranos of the University of Coimbra (the council responsible for protecting Praxe Académica), which explained that students should, in fact, wash the cloak for hygienic purposes. Historically, students were also advised to look presentable while attending classes. The wearer can ask someone special to tear a small part of their cloak, symbolizing that person's importance in the student's academic life. The cloak is also used to show respect for the places one is in or the person one is with. The ultimate demonstration of academic respect is laying the cloak on the ground for someone to walk on.

== Controversies ==
=== Criticism ===
However, Praxe Académica has been abused by some groups of students, regardless of whether they belong to large, ancient institutions or smaller ones. Some Praxe rituals have been accused of violating the principles set forth in the modern codes of praxe, resembling hazing-like, sadistic practices designed to humiliate and demean freshmen.

The tone of criticism surrounding Praxe, however, can sometimes reach levels of "excessive humor" in response to the excessive practices associated with Praxe.

=== Judicial proceedings ===
In the 2000s, students appealed to the Ministry of Higher Education, led by Mariano Gago, to seek justice for praxe abuse, as institutions often ignored their complaints. The first court case involving praxe abuse occurred in 2003 at the Escola Agrária de Santarém (Instituto Politécnico de Santarém), where six students were involved in forcing a freshman to make facial contact with pig excrement. A school van was used in the process, driven by a polytechnic staff member. The students were convicted in 2008 of bodily harm and coercion. Other notable cases include one at the Escola Superior de Tecnologia e Gestão (Instituto Politécnico de Bragança) and another involving a female student at Instituto Piaget, where in December 2008, the court ordered the institution to pay nearly 40,000 euros to the student.

Among the sadistic practices sometimes found in praxe, specific humiliations of freshmen by older students are the most common. These may include forcing them to perform large numbers of push-ups, "kiss the ground," or stand in uncomfortable positions for prolonged periods. There are also more extreme incidents, such as accounts of violence. For example, two freshmen from the University of Coimbra were assaulted by older students, sparking a strong wave of criticism within the Associação Académica de Coimbra. In another case, eight freshmen had to hide from a mob of older students to avoid being harmed, an incident that later prompted police intervention. There are also instances where sexual acts are simulated between older students and freshmen, with older students assuming the role of the active participant. Refusing to participate in praxe also leads to consequences for freshmen, such as being excluded from praxe-related traditions and activities and facing active discrimination within academic life, as freshmen are encouraged to shun those who are anti-praxe.

In 2001, Diogo Macedo, a 4th-year Architecture student at the Universidade Lusíada of Vila Nova de Famalicão, died from wounds caused by massive trauma to his spine. The coroner ruled that the injuries were inflicted by a blunt object during a praxe event.

Judicial proceedings found the university guilty of failing to supervise such events on campus and awarded the parents of the deceased student 90,000 euros. Two suspects were arraigned as defendants, but in 2004, the case was closed due to insufficient evidence to proceed further.

On the night of 15 December 2013, six members of an academic troupe from the private Universidade Lusófona de Humanidades e Tecnologias drowned after being caught by a rogue wave at Meco beach. The sole survivor, João Gouveia, Dux Veteranorum of the praxe at Lusófona University, claimed temporary amnesia regarding the events. It was alleged that the students were caught by the wave while performing a hazing ritual related to praxe and academic tradition. João Gouveia was later judged to determine whether he was guilty of reckless endangerment.

On 23 April 2014, during a praxe course face-off between Informatics Engineering and Medicine students at the Gualtar Campus of Universidade do Minho, four freshmen from Informatics Engineering climbed a 4-meter-wide by 1.5-meter-tall concrete wall to celebrate their victory. The wall collapsed within seconds, crushing three male Informatics Engineering students, aged between 18 and 21, who were standing at the bottom. The veteran students present were accused of homicide by negligence by the Public Ministry but were ultimately absolved by the Braga Court.

On the night of 23 September 2015, a female freshman from the Universidade do Algarve was hospitalized in an alcoholic coma after hazing rituals in Faro, which involved burying the freshmen on the beach and forcing them to drink alcoholic beverages. Following the incident, the university initiated an internal investigation to determine disciplinary actions for those involved. The state prosecution also opened an inquiry into the events.

== See also ==
- Bullying
- Deposition (university)
- Higher education in Portugal
- Hazing
- Initiation
- University of Coimbra
- Homecoming
- Orientation week
