= Academic Crisis =

1962 Portuguese government policy

The Academic Crisis (Portuguese: Crise académica) is the name given to a Portuguese governmental policy instigated in 1962 by the Estado Novo entailing the boycott and closure of several student associations and organizations, including the National Secretariat of Portuguese Students. Most members of this organization were opposition militants, including many communists. PIDE-DGS investigated and persecuted a number of anti-Salazar student political activists jailed or transferred them to different universities to destabilize opposition organizations and networks.

The students responded with demonstrations that culminated on March 24 with widespread student demonstrations in Lisbon that were vigorously suppressed by riot police, leading to hundreds of student injuries. The students responded by going on strike, initiating the Academic Crisis of 1962.

Marcelo Caetano, distinguished member of the Second Portuguese Republic and a reputed professor at the University of Lisbon Law School, resigned from his position of Rector after protesting students clashed with riot police in the university's campus. Caetano would be appointed the second Prime Minister of the Estado Novo and successor of António de Oliveira Salazar in 1968.

After the Carnation Revolution of 1974, 24 March would become the National Day of the Students.
