= Funchal =

- Municipality
- City of Funchal
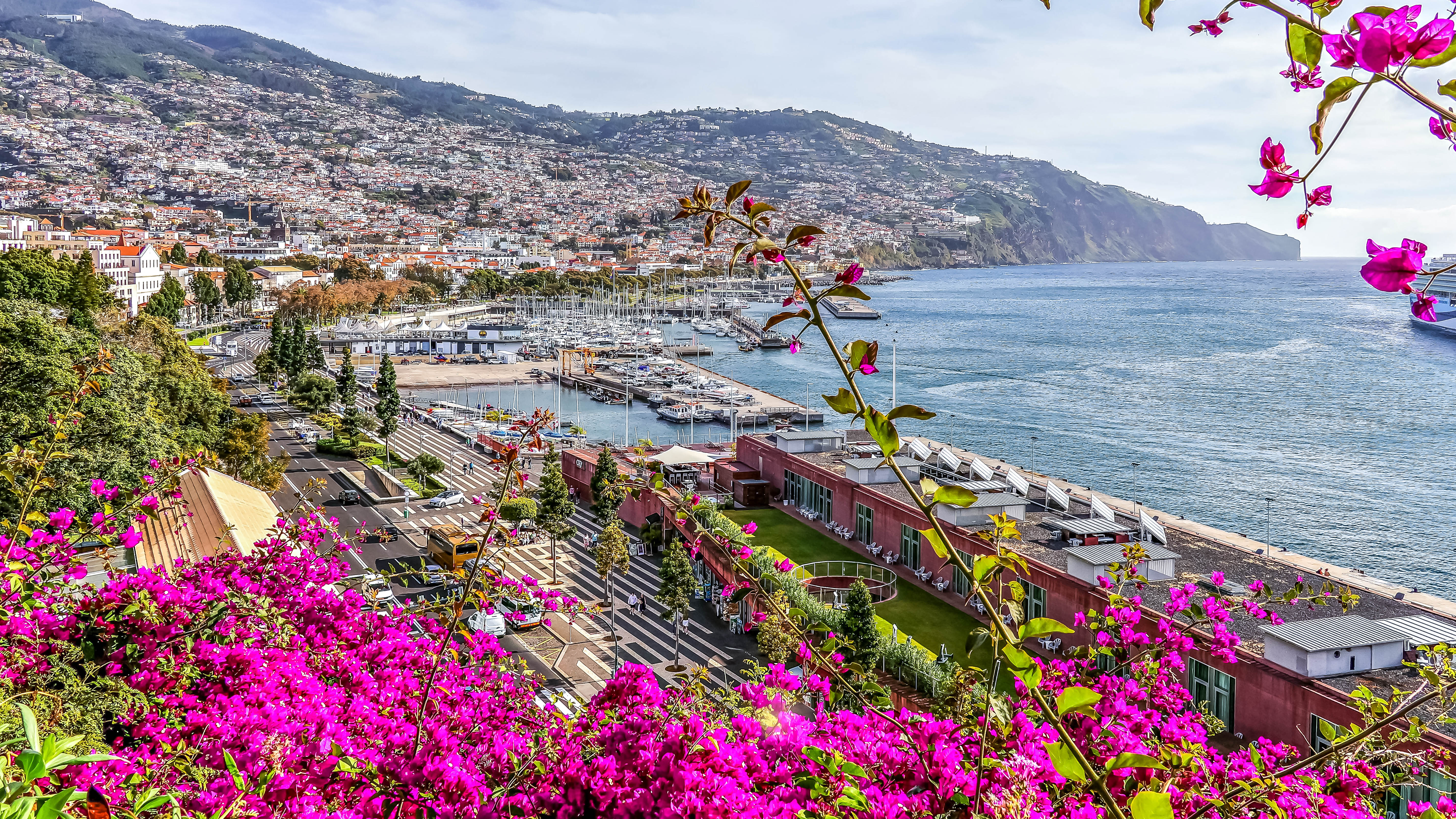
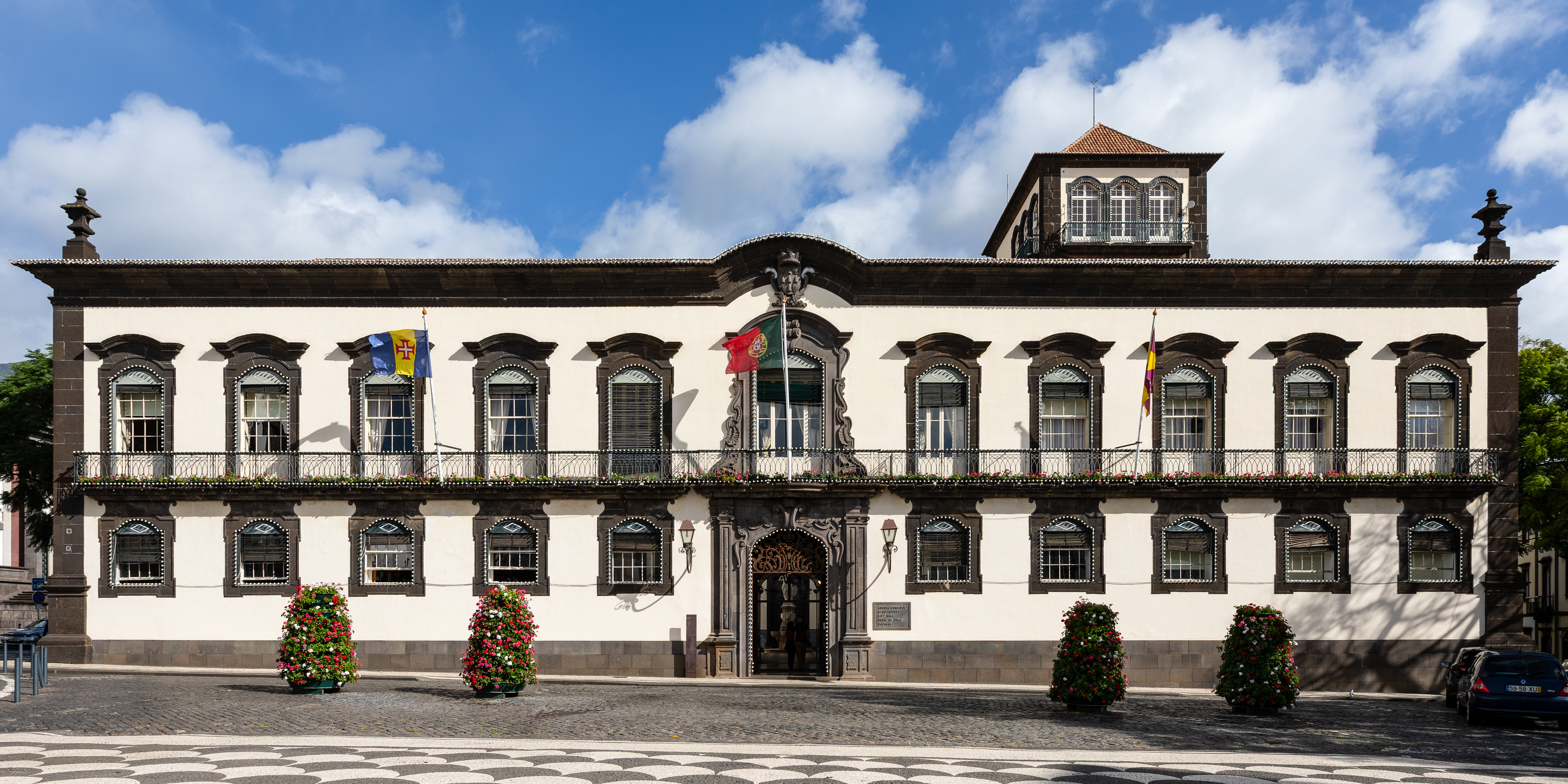
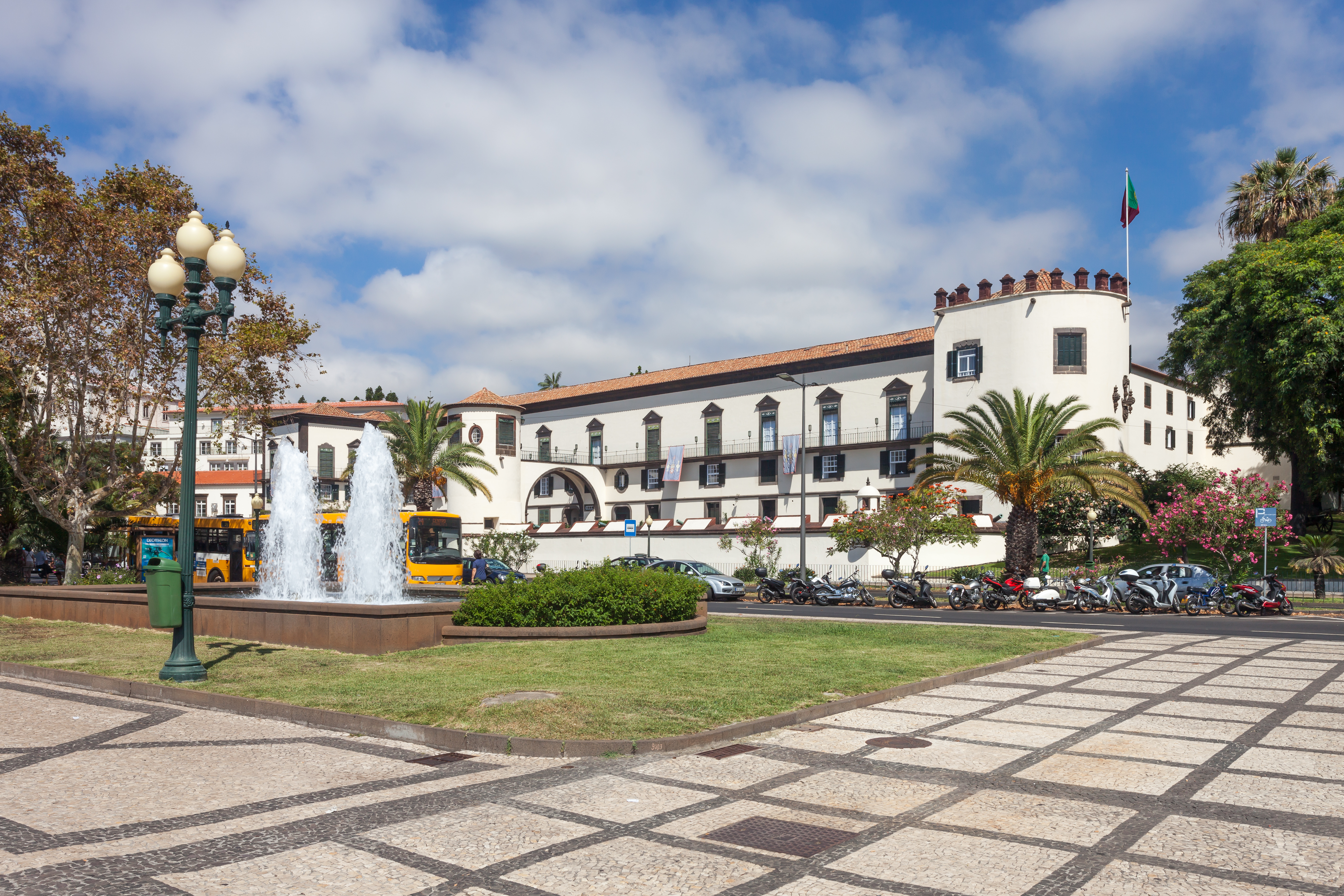
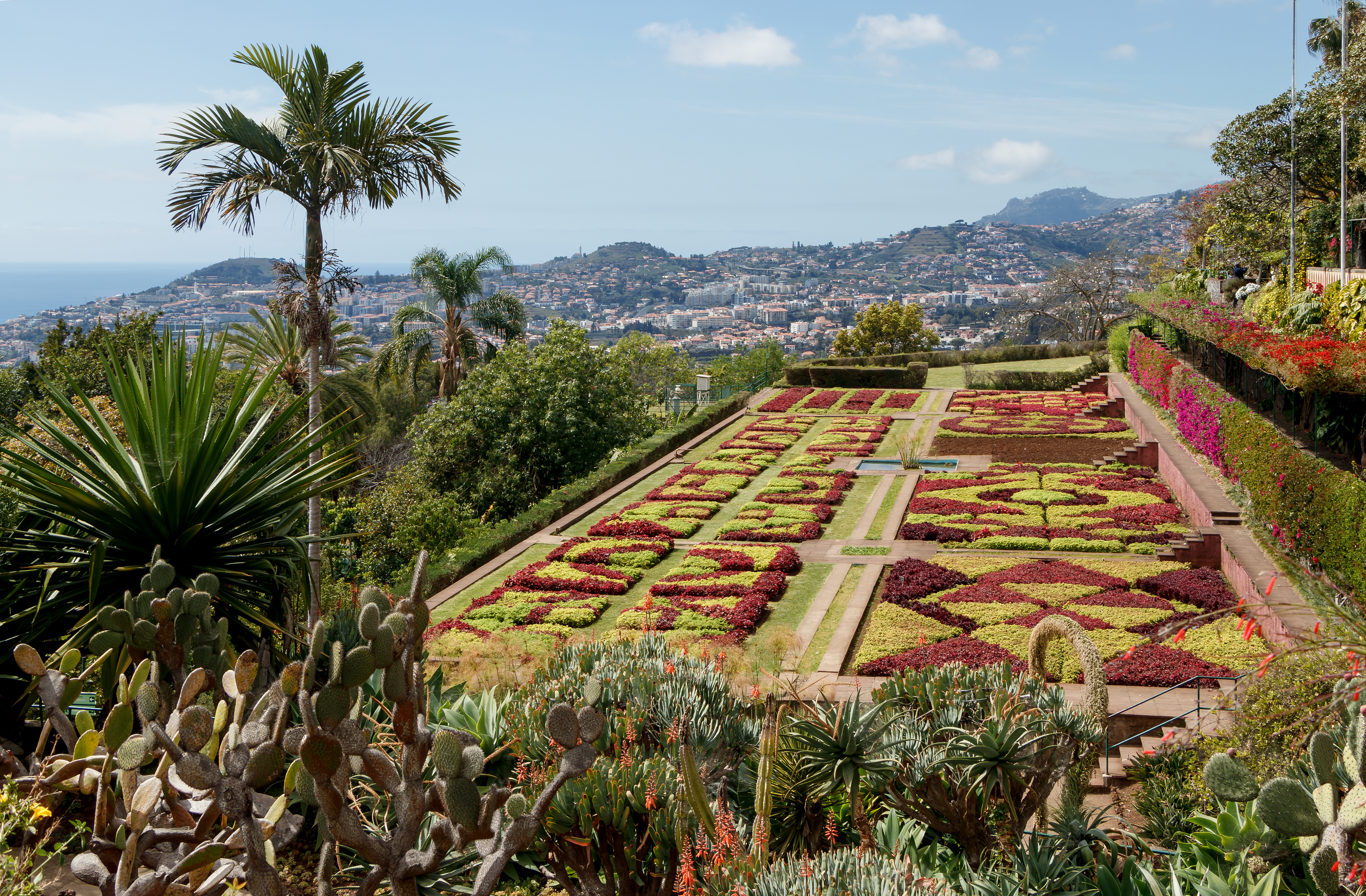
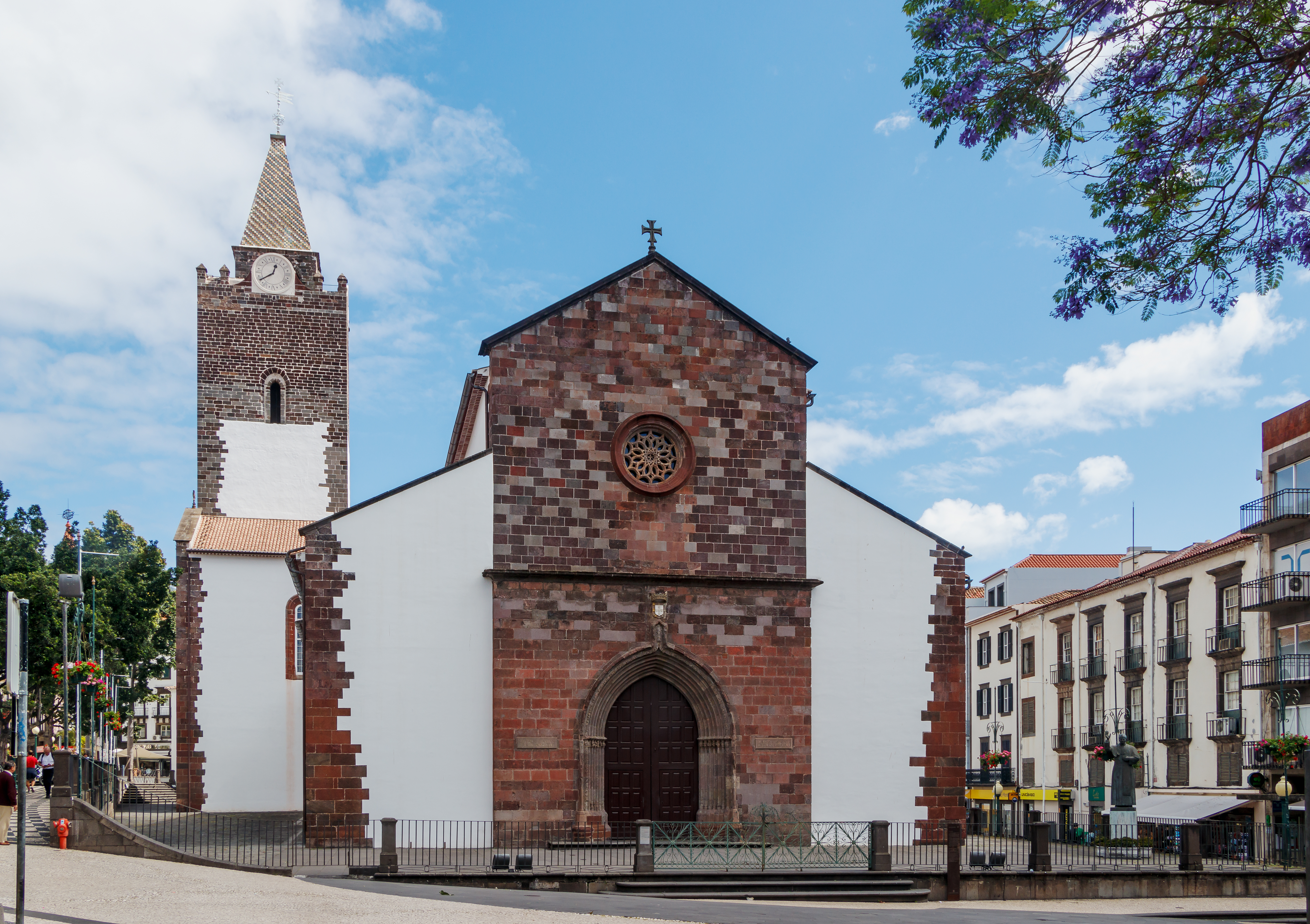
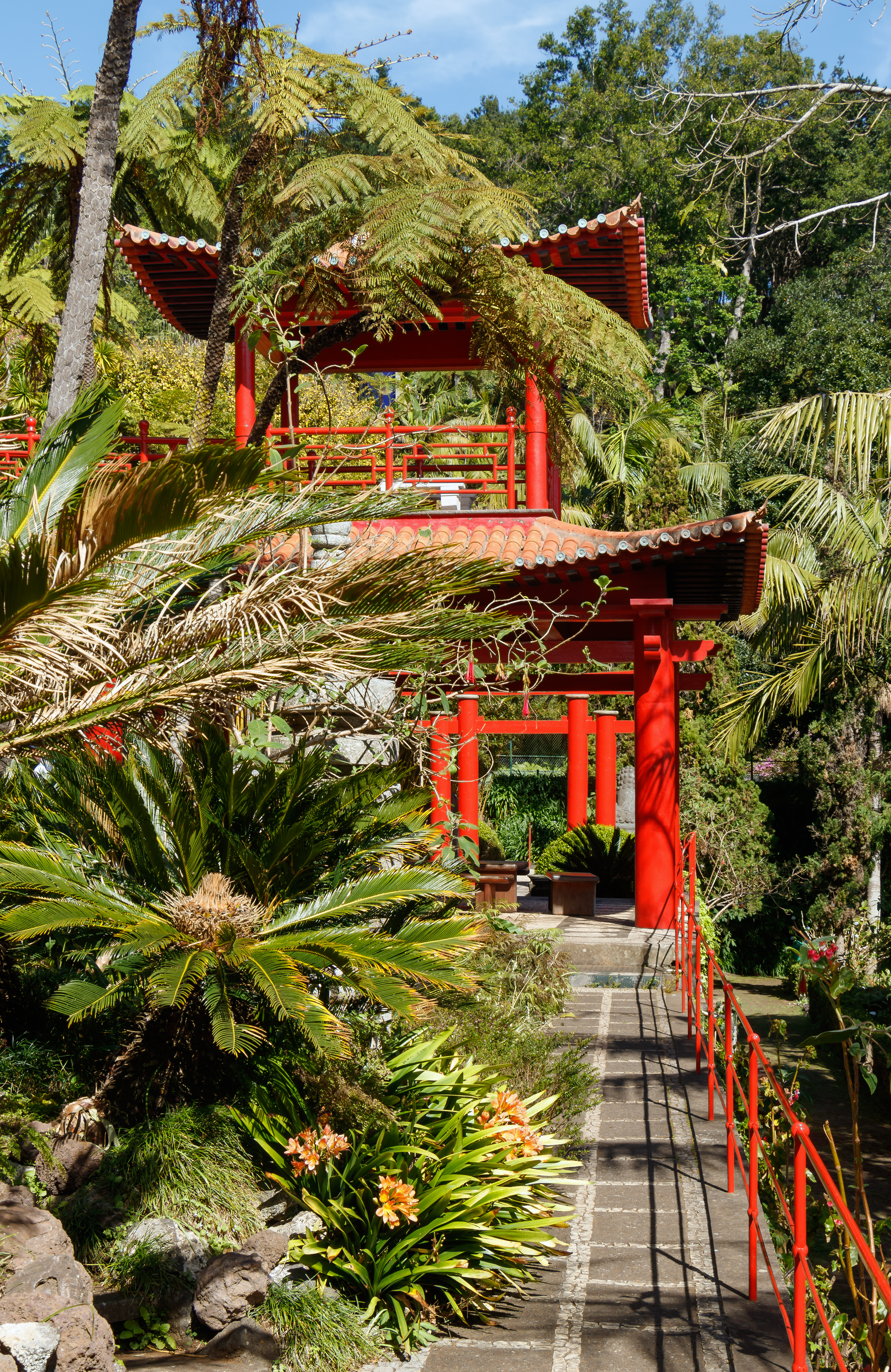
- Partial view of Funchal Funchal City Hall Saint Lawrence's Palace Madeira Botanical Garden Funchal Cathedral Monte Palace Tropical Garden

- Flag Coat of arms

- Location in Madeira
- Coordinates: 32°39′N 16°55′W
- Country: Portugal
- Auton. region: Madeira
- Island: Madeira
- Established: Settlement: c. 1424; Town: c. 1452–1454; Municipality: c. 1508
- Seat: Funchal Municipal Chamber
- Parishes: 10

Government
  - President: Cristina Pedra (PPD/PSD)

Area
  - Total: 76.15 km^{2} (29.40 sq mi)

Population (2021)
  - Total: 105,795
  - Density: 1,389/km^{2} (3,598/sq mi)
- Time zone: UTC+00:00 (WET)
  - Summer (DST): UTC+01:00 (WEST)
- Postal code: 9000
- Area code: 291
- Website: www.funchal.pt

Funchal (Portuguese pronunciation: [fũˈʃal]), officially the City of Funchal (Portuguese: Cidade do Funchal), is the capital, largest city and a municipality in Portugal's Autonomous Region of Madeira, bordered by the Atlantic Ocean. The city has a population of 105,795, making it the sixth largest city in Portugal. Because of its high cultural and historical value, Funchal is one of Portugal's main tourist attractions; it is also popular as a destination for New Year's Eve, and it is the leading Portuguese port on cruise liner dockings.

== Etymology ==
The first settlers named their settlement Funchal after the abundant wild fennel that grew there. The name is formed from the Portuguese word for fennel, funcho, and the suffix -al, to denote "a plantation of fennel":

Funchal, to whom the captain gave this name, because it was founded in a beautiful forested valley, full of fennel up to the sea ...

— Gaspar Frutuoso, 16th century, As Saudades da Terra

== History ==
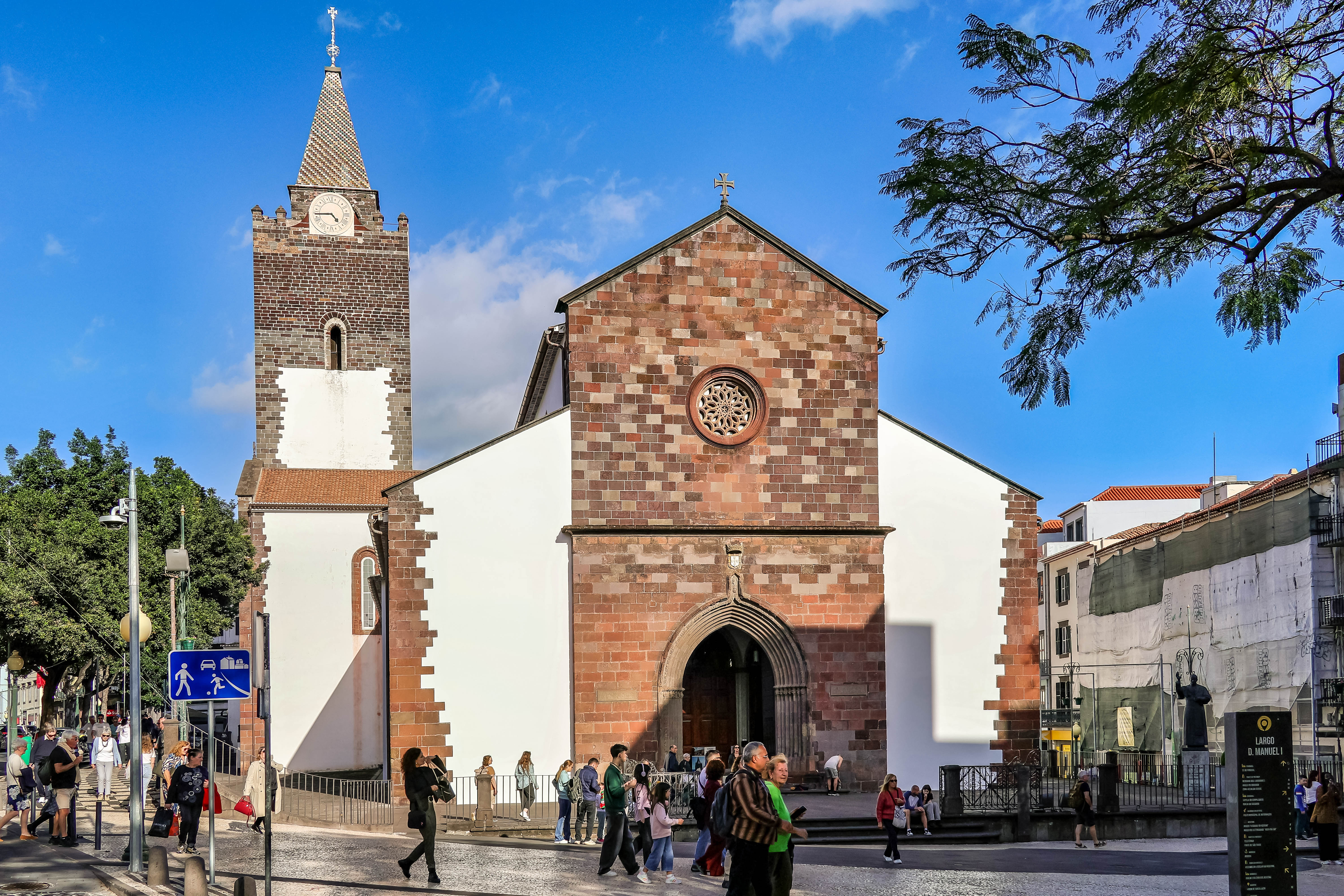
Cathedral of Funchal (Sé Catedral), constructed under the orders of D. Manuel, Duke of Beja, dating back to the 15th century

The settlement of Funchal began between 1420 and 1425. The island was divided into two captaincies. The zones that would become the urbanized core of Funchal were founded by João Gonçalves Zarco who settled there with members of his family. Owing to its geographic location, the site became an important maritime port and its productive soils attracted new settlers. Its coastal position, the most productive on the island, quickly permitted Funchal to develop an urban core and surpass the populations of other settlements.

In the early 15th century, Álvaro Fernandes became the commander of Funchal.

As part of its administrative role, the settlement received its primary lighthouse between 1452 and 1454, when it was elevated to the status of vila and municipal seat. Funchal became an important transfer point for European commercial interests. Many of merchant families established commercial interests on the island, including: João d'Esmenaut from the Picardy region, the Doria, Cattaneo, Usodimare, Lomelino, di Negro and Spinola, from Genoa, the Mondragão from Biscay, the Acciauoli from Florence, the Bettencourts from France, the Lemilhana Berenguer from Valencia and many others.

During the second half of the 15th century, the sugar industry expanded significantly along the southern coast, from Machico until Fajã da Ovelha, making Funchal the most important industrial centre of the industry. By the end of the century, fronting the Order of Christ, D. Manuel, Duke of Beja, expanded the support of the local community; he ordered the construction of the administrative Paços do Concelho and the Paços dos Tabeliães (completed in 1491), raised the construction of a church (began in 1493 and later raised to cathedral in 1514), and finally the construction of a hospital and customs-house in the village. In 1508, it was elevated to the status of city by King Manuel I of Portugal, and in 1514 (on completion of the Sé Cathedral) the bishopric was headquartered in Funchal.

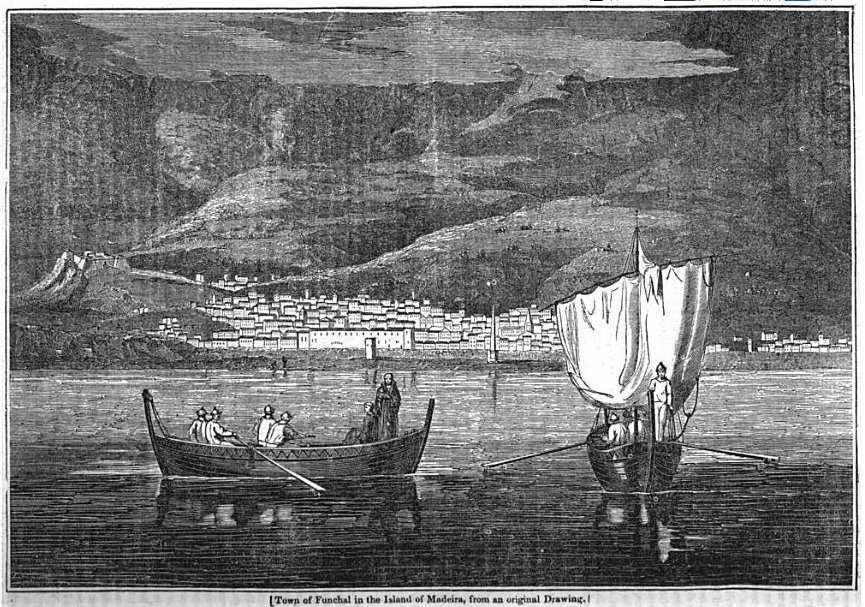
A cityscape of Funchal, 1834 as seen from the Bay

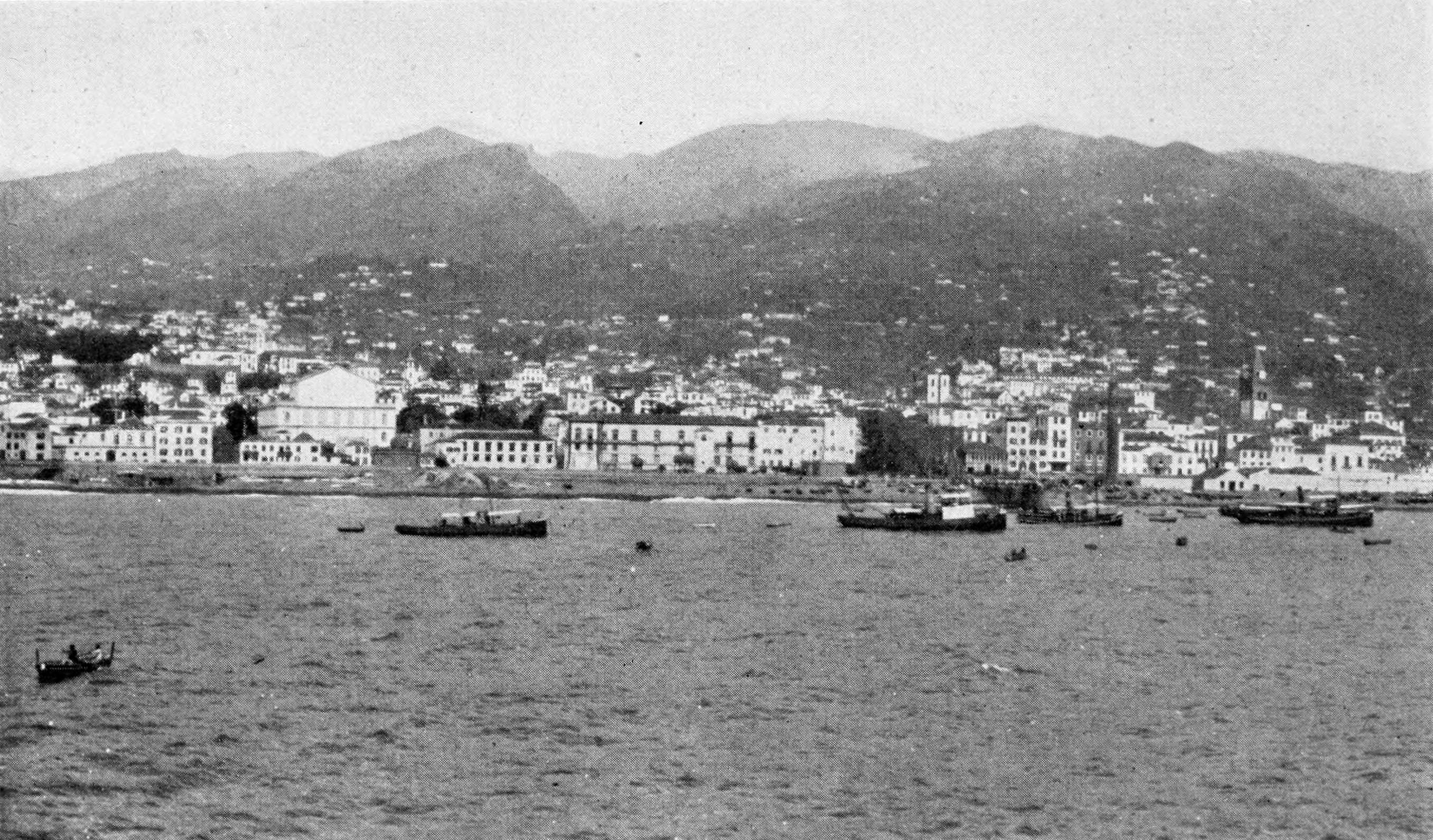
Funchal, 1907

In September 1566, French corsairs under the command of Bertrand de Montluc, a gentleman in the court of Charles IX of France and second-son of Field Marshal Blaise de Montluc, departed from Bordeaux with a force of 1200 men, on a small fleet of three main ships and eight support craft. The armada sacked Porto Santo. When the news was relayed to the settlements on Madeira and the villas of Machico and Santa Cruz, the citizenry armed themselves. In Funchal, the governor, Francisco de Sales Gonçalves Zarco da Câmara, did not take any hostile action. Meanwhile, the armada anchored off the beach of Formosa, disembarked a contingent of 800 men that marched towards the city in three columns, encountering no resistance until the main bridge in São Paulo. At the bridge the privateers encountered a force from the small fort, with a few small-caliber pieces, which were quickly routed in confusion. At the road near Carreira, the attackers were confronted by a small group of Franciscan friars, who were quickly dispatched. Funchal's fortifications were finally assaulted by land, where its defense was thin; the defenders could not even reposition many of the cannons directed towards the sea. The city suffered a violent sack that lasted fifteen days, after which little remained.

The following year, the military architect Mateus Fernandes III was sent to Funchal in order to completely modify the defensive system of the city. Evidence of the work produced by this architect was published in the "Mapa de Mateus Fernandes" (1573), considered to be the oldest plan of the island of Funchal. The document identifies the major defenses of the city, which included a large fortification in the area around the dyke in Pena.

During the 16th century, Funchal was an important stop-over for caravels travelling between the Indies and the New World.

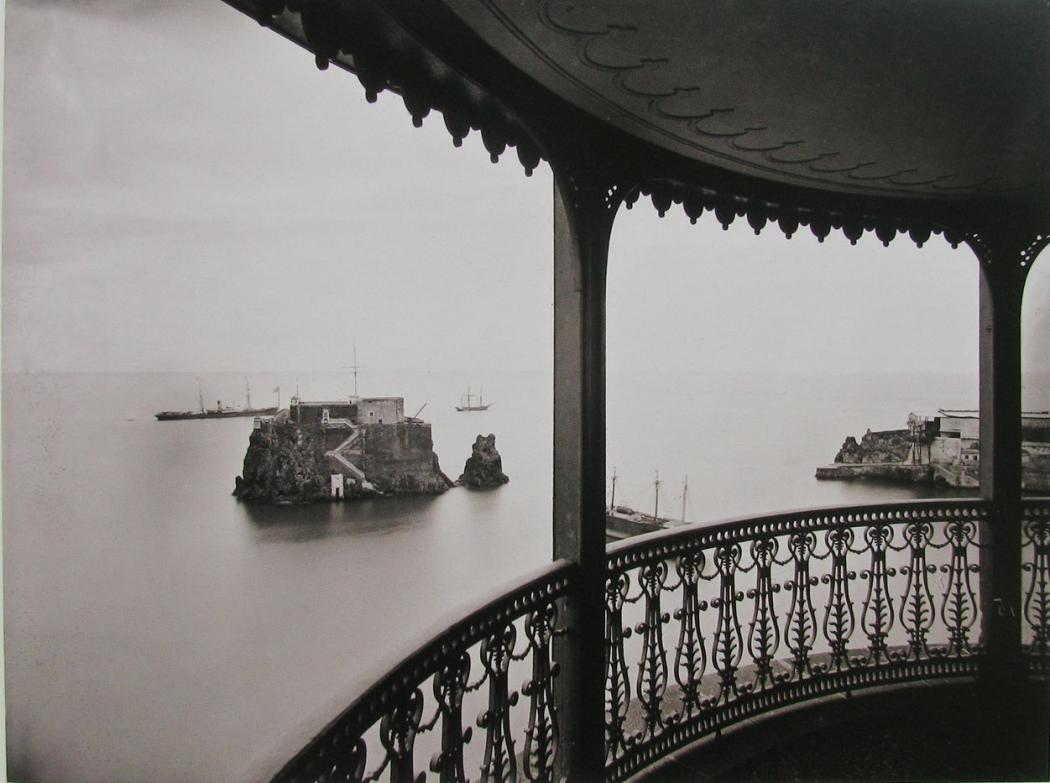
Overlook of Quinta Vigia, now the Regional Government's Presidential Palace, towards the then port of Funchal

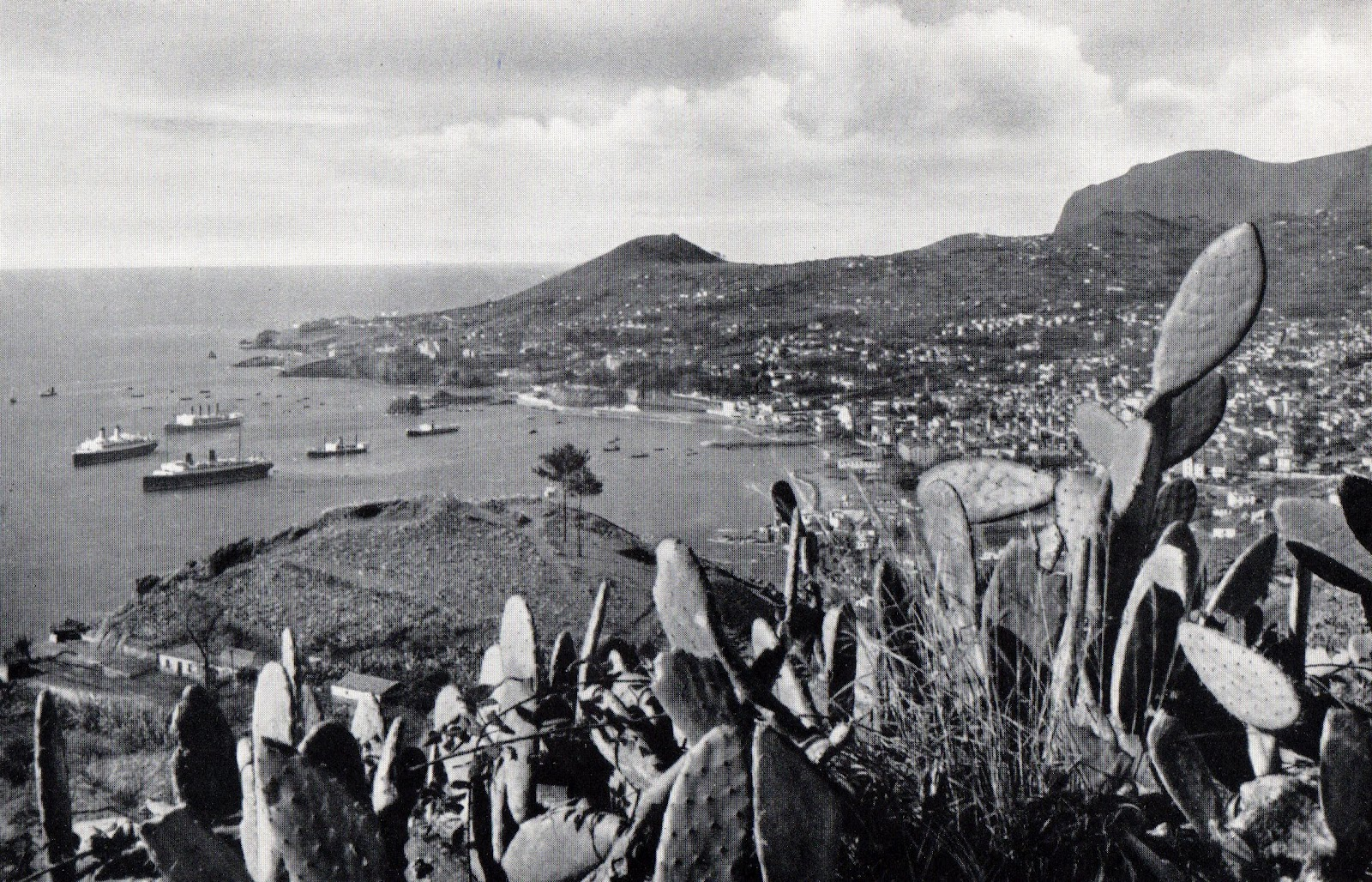
View of Funchal's bay in 1936, from the São Gonçalo hilltops

The wine culture appeared during early settlement, through the incentives from Henry the Navigator. By 1455, the Venetian navigator, Luís de Cadamosto, on visiting Madeira, referred to the excellence of the Madeirense wines, principally the Malvasia castes from the island of Crete, which were being exported in greater numbers. By the end of the 16th century, the celebrated English poet and playwright, William Shakespeare, cited the important export and notoriety of the Madeiran Malvasia castes: in Richard III the Duke of Clarence, the brother of King Edward IV selected a death by drowning in a barrel of Madeira. Later, in Shakespeare's Henry IV he has Poins censure Falstaff for having sold his soul to the devil for a cup of Madeira wine. The growth of viticulture in Madeira expanded when the sugar industry was attacked by cheaper exports from the New World and Africa, but also from various epidemics and the after-effects of the 1566 privateer sacks. In the 17th century, commercial treaties with England brought increased investments to a business that was still insular. Many commercial wine-makers from England moved to the island, changing the economy, architecture forms and lifestyle of the community. This incremental growth expanded the city with new estates, and a new merchant class that populated the urban quarters. Generally, there were many new three-floor homes with an intermediary service floor, a floor for storage and wine-cellars, and in some cases a tower to watch the port and monitor shipping in the harbour. Various island governors and the convents participated in commercial viticulture. The Companhia de Jesus developed the vast estate of Campanário, which extended from the city to Fajã dos Padres into one of the most successful wines on the island, whereas the nuns of Santa Clara, owners of some large parcels of land, entered into the wine industry, financing the ships that would take their wines to Brazil (and exchanging them for sugar for their sweets business). But, during the 19th century there were epidemics, aggravating the economy and forcing some to return to sugar plantations. In order to maintain the level of development, many landowners tried to plant new more-resistant castes, but of an inferior quality, in order to support the industry.

Among the notable visitors to the region were Queen Adelaide of the United Kingdom, Prince Alexander of the Netherlands (who died in Funchal in 1848), Empress Amélia of Brazil and Elisabeth, empress of Austria-Hungary. Most of them travelled to the island hoping the gentle climate would benefit their health. Charles I of Austria, Emperor of Austria and king of Hungary, 1916–1918, was exiled to Funchal. Polish Field Marshal Józef Piłsudski in order to recuperate his health. Winston Churchill travelled there on holidays and was known to have painted a few paintings during his visits and Fulgencio Batista stopped over en route to his exile in Spain. The presence of these notable visitors marked a period when Funchal became a center of tourism and therapeutic health. With the formal creation of the Port of Funchal, and later the establishment of the Santa Catarina Airport, Funchal turned into a major international tourist destination supported by a series of hotels and ocean-front residences.

== Geography ==
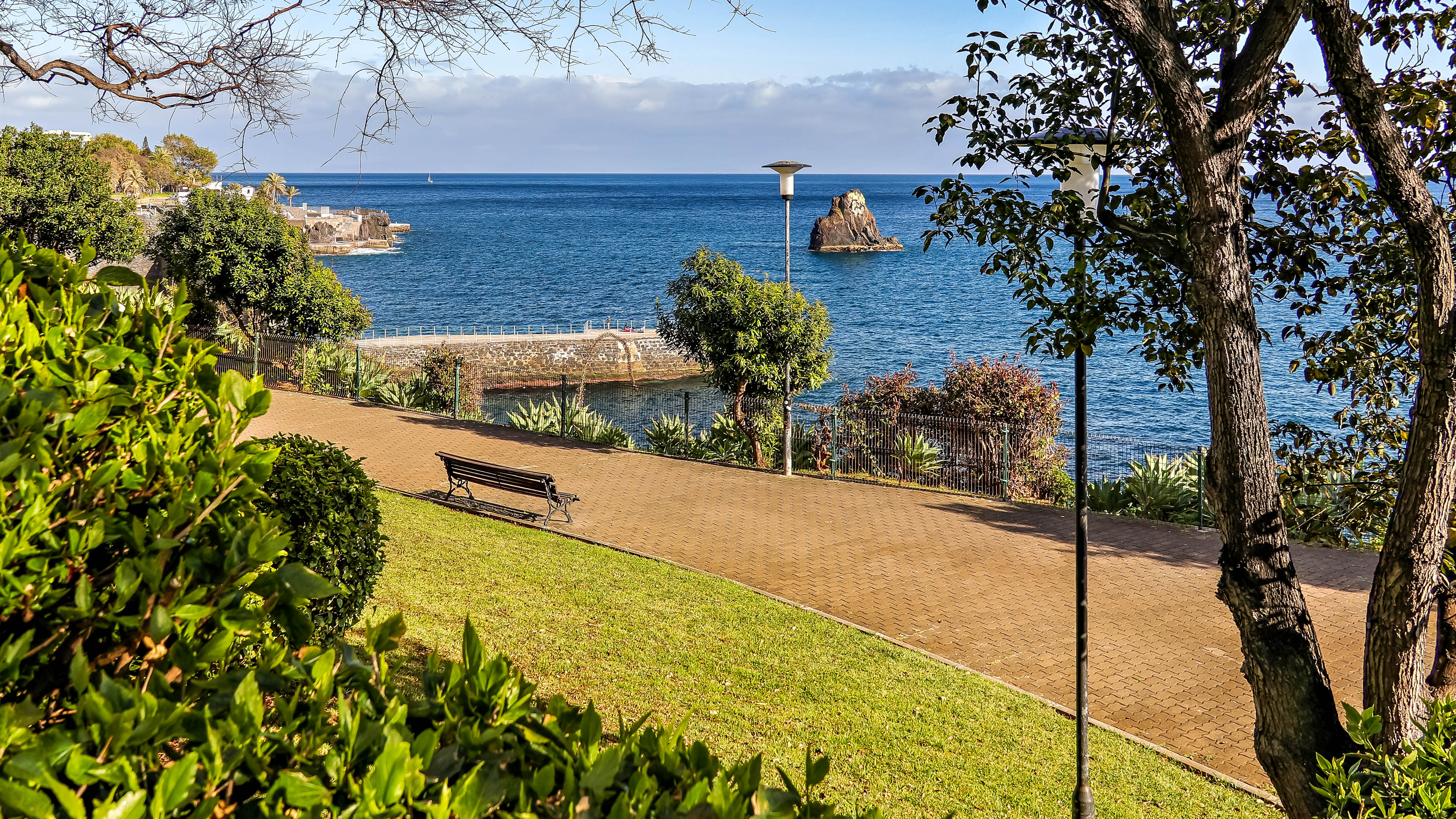
Promenade in southwest Funchal

=== Physical geography ===
Funchal is located inside a natural amphitheatre-shaped valley, with gentle slopes beginning at the coast which rise to 1200 metres and provide a natural shelter for early settlers

In addition to the urbanized area, the municipality includes the Ilhas Selvagens (English: Savage Islands), a nature reserve located 294 km (183 mi) south of the capital.

=== Climate ===
According to the Köppen climate classification, Funchal has a subtropical, hot-summer Mediterranean climate (Köppen: Csa).

The climate can be divided into two main seasons: a warm dry summer season spanning from May to September with average daily high temperatures ranging from 22 to 27 °C (72 to 81 °F), and a cooler wet winter season from October to April with average daily high temperatures ranging from 20 to 25 °C (68 to 77 °F). The city has warm temperatures all year round, and humidity levels remain constantly high at about 70%.

Sea temperatures range from a low of 18 °C (64 °F) in February–March to 24 °C (75 °F) in August–October.

Since the city rises from the sea level up to altitudes of 800 metres (2,600 ft) on its northern slopes, it is quite common to experience cloudiness, fog and rain in the northern suburbs while, at the same time, having clear skies in the south. Temperatures also tend to be slightly lower at the higher altitudes.

Early summer, especially June, tends to be quite infamous due to a phenomenon where persistent cloudiness covers the entire bay area of the city, similar to the June Gloom phenomenon, locally nicknamed "Funchal's helmet". The length and severity of the wet and dry seasons varied greatly from year to year.

Climate data for Funchal Observatory, 1991-2020, altitude: 58 m (190 ft)
Month	Jan	Feb	Mar	Apr	May	Jun	Jul	Aug	Sep	Oct	Nov	Dec	Year
Record high °C (°F)	25.6 (78.1)	28.6 (83.5)	30.5 (86.9)	32.6 (90.7)	34.2 (93.6)	33.9 (93.0)	37.7 (99.9)	38.2 (100.8)	34.3 (93.7)	34.3 (93.7)	29.5 (85.1)	27.1 (80.8)	38.2 (100.8)
Mean daily maximum °C (°F)	20.0 (68.0)	19.9 (67.8)	20.6 (69.1)	21.0 (69.8)	22.0 (71.6)	23.7 (74.7)	25.4 (77.7)	26.8 (80.2)	26.6 (79.9)	25.2 (77.4)	22.8 (73.0)	21.0 (69.8)	22.9 (73.2)
Daily mean °C (°F)	17.1 (62.8)	16.8 (62.2)	17.4 (63.3)	17.9 (64.2)	19.1 (66.4)	20.9 (69.6)	22.6 (72.7)	23.7 (74.7)	23.5 (74.3)	22.2 (72.0)	19.9 (67.8)	18.3 (64.9)	20.0 (67.9)
Mean daily minimum °C (°F)	14.3 (57.7)	13.9 (57.0)	14.3 (57.7)	14.9 (58.8)	16.2 (61.2)	18.2 (64.8)	19.7 (67.5)	20.7 (69.3)	20.4 (68.7)	19.2 (66.6)	17.0 (62.6)	15.5 (59.9)	17.0 (62.7)
Record low °C (°F)	9.2 (48.6)	8.7 (47.7)	8.5 (47.3)	11.1 (52.0)	9.7 (49.5)	14.5 (58.1)	16.3 (61.3)	17.5 (63.5)	17.9 (64.2)	13.5 (56.3)	11.2 (52.2)	11.0 (51.8)	8.5 (47.3)
Average precipitation mm (inches)	67.1 (2.64)	72.4 (2.85)	62.3 (2.45)	45.2 (1.78)	27.2 (1.07)	7.8 (0.31)	1.7 (0.07)	1.3 (0.05)	23.1 (0.91)	91.2 (3.59)	80.3 (3.16)	94.8 (3.73)	574.4 (22.61)
Average rainy days (≥ 1 mm)	6.2	5.5	5.8	4.7	3.3	1.0	0.3	0.4	3.1	7.0	7.3	8.6	53.2
Average relative humidity (%)	71	70	68	68	70	73	73	72	71	71	70	70	71
Mean monthly sunshine hours	160.9	166.8	197.7	194.8	208.6	194.0	232.5	236.7	210.8	194.3	165.9	151.1	2,314.1
Percentage possible sunshine	50	54	53	50	48	45	55	57	57	55	53	49	52
Average ultraviolet index	4.0	5.9	8.0	9.7	10.4	11.0	10.8	10.1	8.6	7.2	4.7	3.4	7.8
Source 1: Instituto Português do Mar e da Atmosfera (average daily max UV recorded in 2015-2020)
Source 2: NOAA (humidity 1961–1990), German Meteorological Service (sunshine 1991-2020)

Climate data for Funchal Observatory, 1991–2020 (extremes 1961-2024), altitude: 58 m (190 ft)
Month	Jan	Feb	Mar	Apr	May	Jun	Jul	Aug	Sep	Oct	Nov	Dec	Year
Record high °C (°F)	25.5 (77.9)	27.0 (80.6)	30.5 (86.9)	32.6 (90.7)	34.2 (93.6)	34.7 (94.5)	37.7 (99.9)	38.5 (101.3)	38.4 (101.1)	34.1 (93.4)	31.0 (87.8)	26.5 (79.7)	38.5 (101.3)
Mean maximum °C (°F)	21.8 (71.2)	21.8 (71.2)	23.2 (73.8)	24.1 (75.4)	25.7 (78.3)	27.5 (81.5)	29.7 (85.5)	29.6 (85.3)	28.8 (83.8)	27.4 (81.3)	24.8 (76.6)	22.8 (73.0)	31.6 (88.9)
Mean daily maximum °C (°F)	19.8 (67.6)	19.8 (67.6)	20.4 (68.7)	20.9 (69.6)	22.1 (71.8)	23.8 (74.8)	25.6 (78.1)	26.8 (80.2)	26.5 (79.7)	25.1 (77.2)	22.6 (72.7)	20.8 (69.4)	22.8 (73.1)
Daily mean °C (°F)	17.2 (63.0)	17.0 (62.6)	17.5 (63.5)	18.0 (64.4)	19.2 (66.6)	21.1 (70.0)	22.7 (72.9)	23.9 (75.0)	23.6 (74.5)	22.2 (72.0)	19.9 (67.8)	18.3 (64.9)	20.1 (68.1)
Mean daily minimum °C (°F)	14.6 (58.3)	14.1 (57.4)	14.5 (58.1)	15.1 (59.2)	16.3 (61.3)	18.3 (64.9)	19.8 (67.6)	20.9 (69.6)	20.6 (69.1)	19.3 (66.7)	17.2 (63.0)	15.7 (60.3)	17.2 (63.0)
Mean minimum °C (°F)	11.6 (52.9)	11.3 (52.3)	11.3 (52.3)	12.4 (54.3)	13.6 (56.5)	15.9 (60.6)	17.4 (63.3)	18.7 (65.7)	18.5 (65.3)	16.2 (61.2)	13.6 (56.5)	12.8 (55.0)	10.3 (50.5)
Record low °C (°F)	8.2 (46.8)	7.4 (45.3)	7.7 (45.9)	9.3 (48.7)	9.7 (49.5)	12.0 (53.6)	14.6 (58.3)	16.3 (61.3)	14.9 (58.8)	13.1 (55.6)	9.8 (49.6)	8.0 (46.4)	7.4 (45.3)
Average precipitation mm (inches)	98.7 (3.89)	95.0 (3.74)	83.4 (3.28)	61.8 (2.43)	44.5 (1.75)	16.8 (0.66)	3.7 (0.15)	4.0 (0.16)	44.9 (1.77)	117.9 (4.64)	111.7 (4.40)	135.3 (5.33)	817.7 (32.2)
Average precipitation days (≥ 1 mm)	9.2	8.3	9.6	6.6	5.2	2.4	0.9	1.4	5.1	9.7	10.5	12.0	80.9
Average relative humidity (%)	71	70	68	68	70	73	73	72	71	71	70	70	71
Mean monthly sunshine hours	161	167	198	195	209	194	233	237	211	194	166	151	2,316
Average ultraviolet index	4.0	5.9	8.0	9.7	10.4	11.0	10.8	10.1	8.6	7.2	4.7	3.4	7.8
Source 1: Météo Climat Infoclimat (average daily max UV recorded in 2015-2020)
Source 2: NOAA (humidity 1961–1990), German Meteorological Service (sunshine 1991-2020)

=== Climate change ===
A 2019 paper published in PLOS One estimated that under Representative Concentration Pathway 4.5, a "moderate" scenario of climate change where global warming reaches ~2.5–3 °C (4.5–5.4 °F) by 2100, the climate of Funchal in the year 2050 would most closely resemble the current climate of Rabat in Morocco. The annual temperature and the temperature of the warmest and coldest month would all increase by 1.9 °C (3.4 °F), putting the coldest and warmest months above 18 to 24 °C (64 to 75 °F). According to Climate Action Tracker, the current warming trajectory appears consistent with 2.7 °C (4.9 °F), which closely matches RCP 4.5.

=== Human geography ===
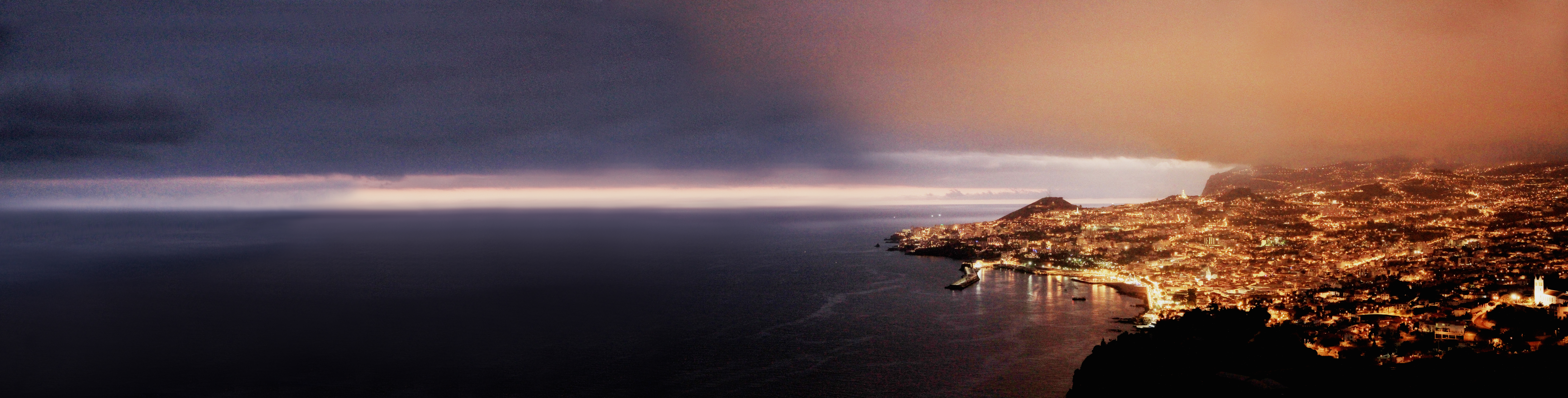
Panoramic view of Funchal Bay during sunset, taken from Ponta do Garajau

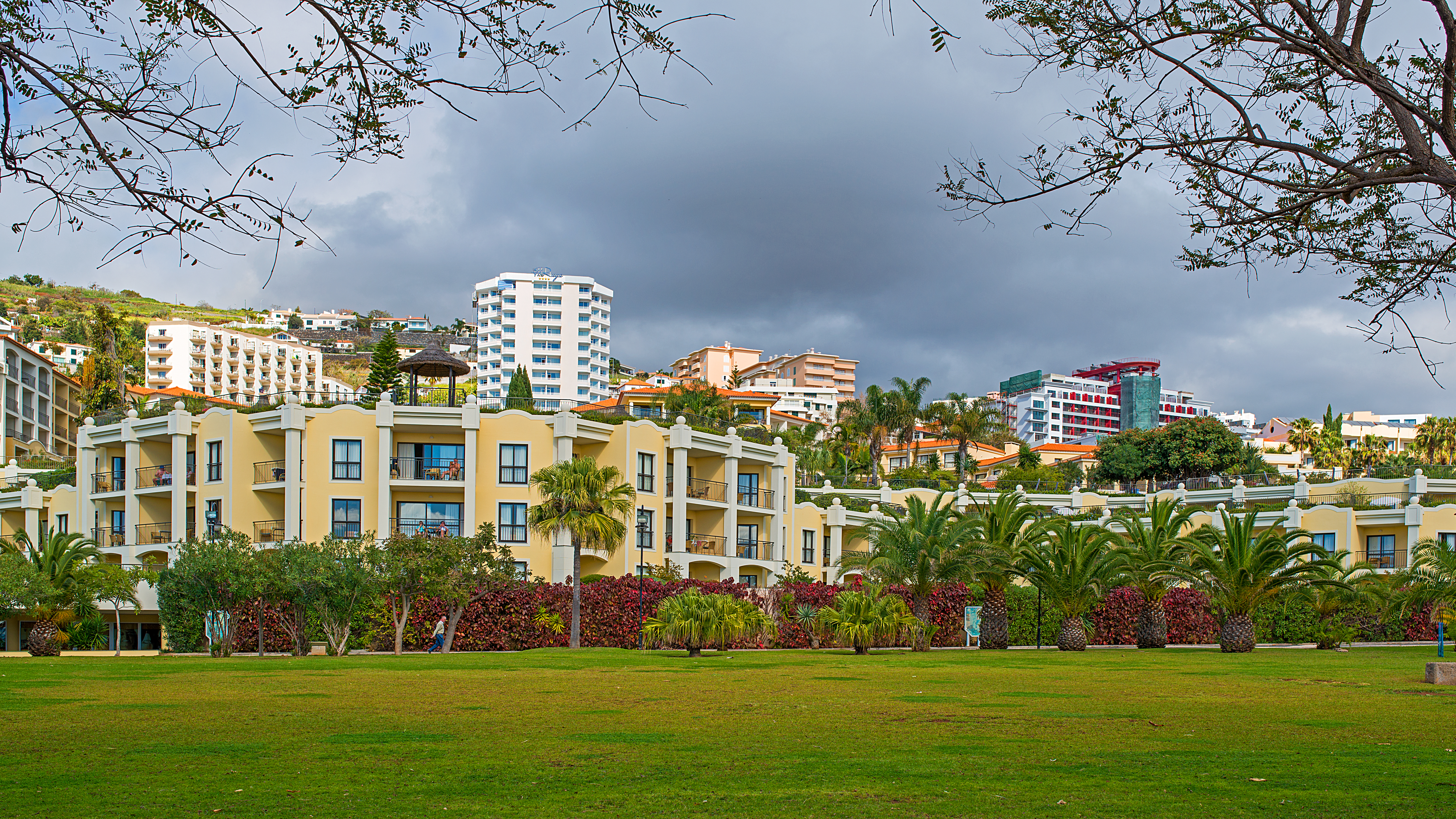
A leisure park in Lido, in São Martinho

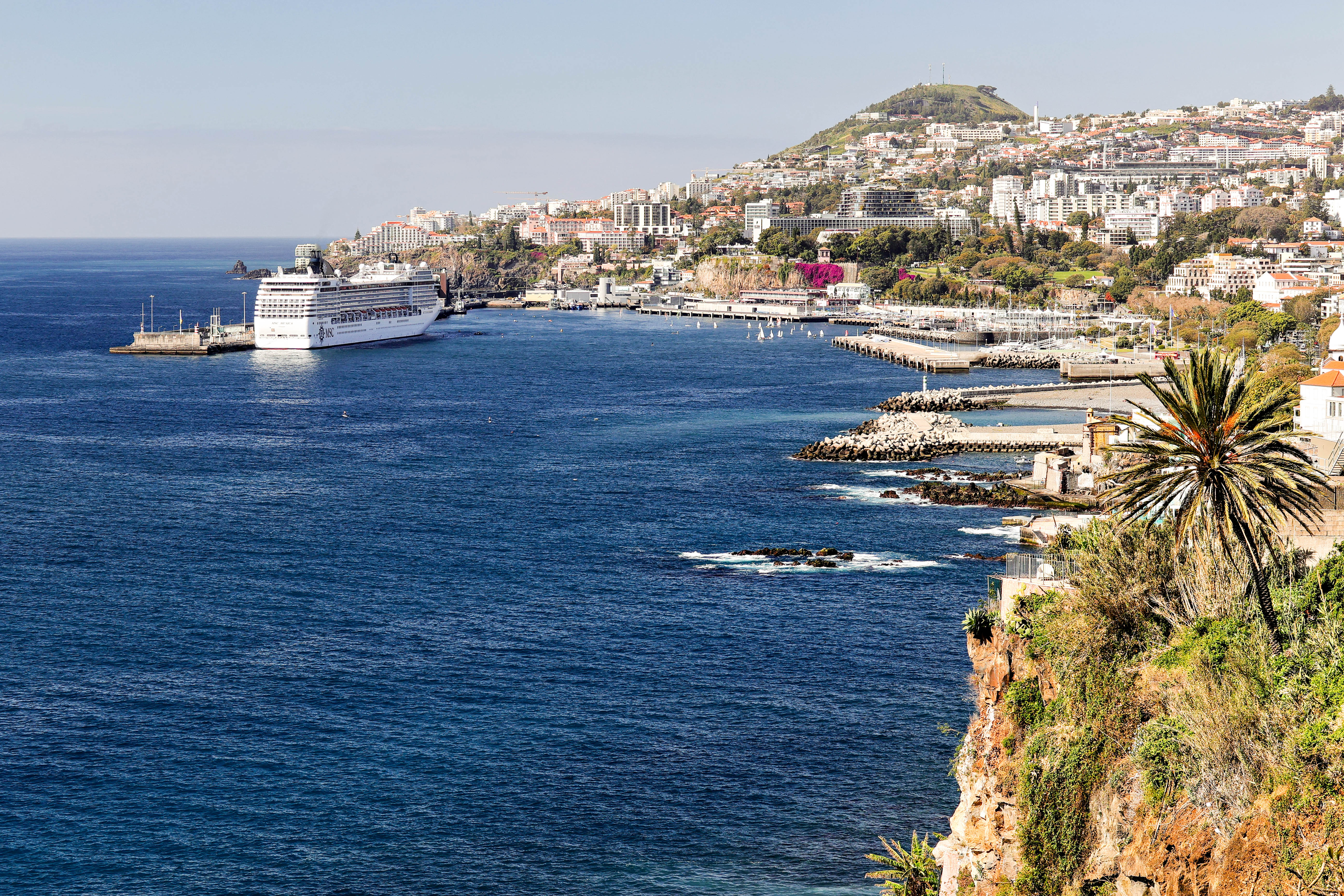
Sea Port of Funchal

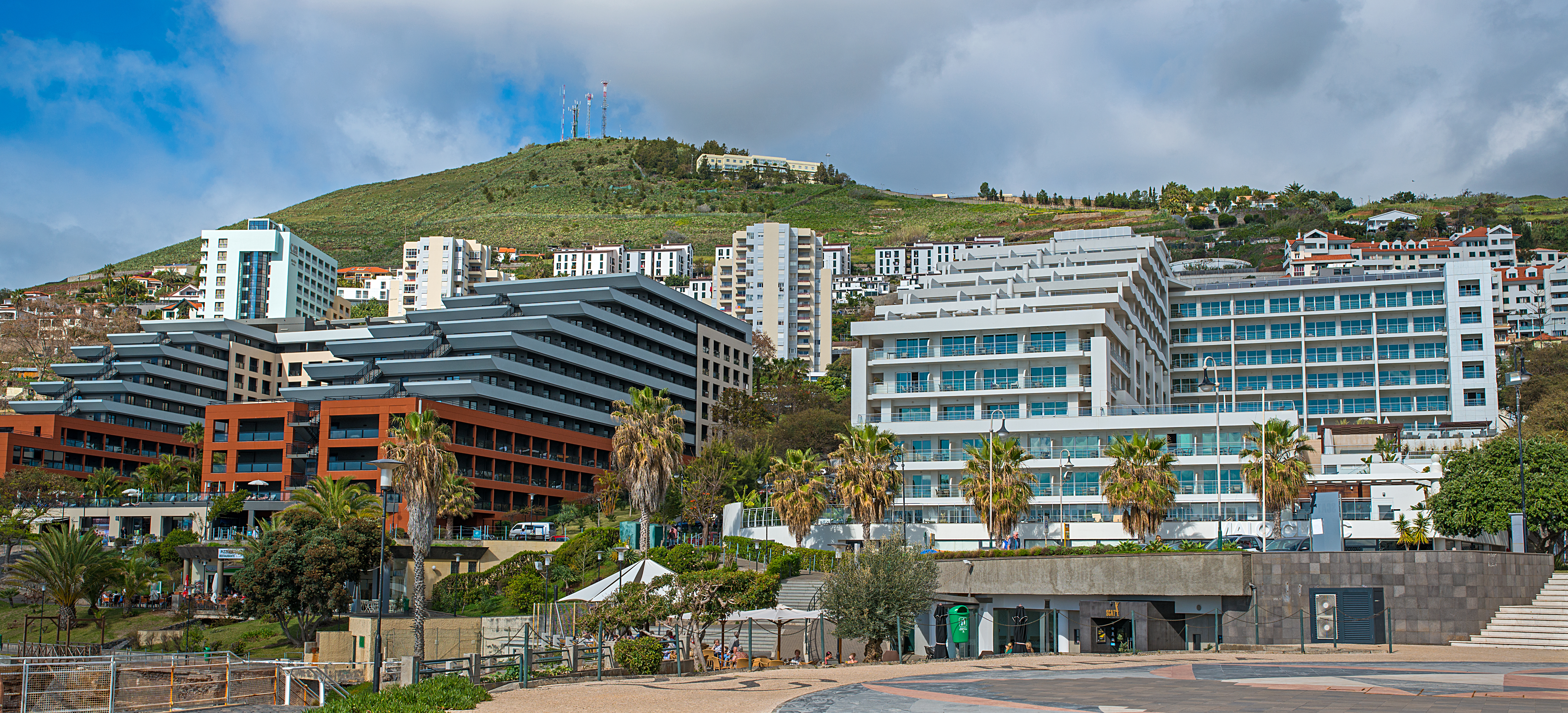
Lido, Funchal's hotel zone

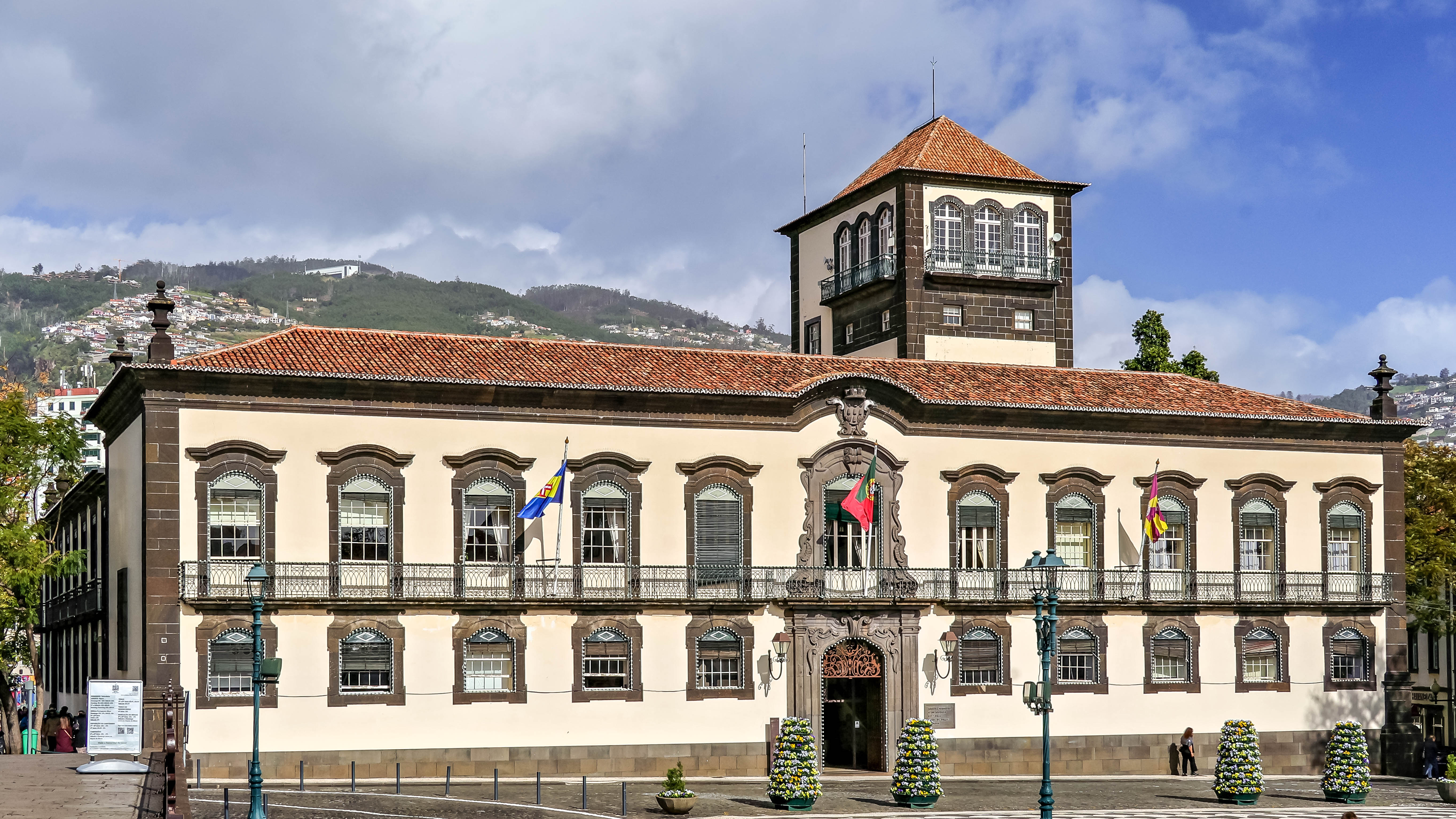
Town hall of Funchal seen in 2026

The urbanised core of the city of Funchal includes several of the civil parishes that surround the municipality (Câmara de Lobos, Santa Cruz, Machico and Ribeira Brava), and includes a population of 150,000 inhabitants, the largest Portuguese city outside of mainland Portugal. The municipality itself is a grouping of several smaller administrative entities, that includes Funchal, Câmara de Lobos, Caniço and Santa Cruz, located along the southern coast of Madeira. Funchal is a cosmopolitan and panoramic city, with parks, shops and hotels.

The municipality (Portuguese: concelho) and city (Portuguese: cidade) are one administrative division, administered by an executive and legislative committee in the city hall. Local communities, are administered at the civil parish levels, through their own legislative bodies and executives. Funchal comprises ten civil parishes (Portuguese: freguesias) based on traditional religious districts (Portuguese: paróquias):

- Imaculado Coração de Maria – a northern suburb, it is one of the smaller parishes in area, with the highest concentrations of residents (6951 residents in 2001);
- Monte – originally a summer refuge for the wealthy, due to its mild climate, Monte is symbolised by the toboggan drivers that race tourists down to the central town; today it is one of the more populated areas of Funchal with over 7500 inhabitants;
- Santa Luzia – one of the four urban suburbs of Funchal, developed from urban sprawl that expanded into the hinterland; today there are more than 6600 inhabitants in these foothills;
- Santa Maria Maior – named from the first episcopal divisions on the island, it along with Sé were the first faith communities to develop, concentrating along the coast in the church of Nossa Senhora do Calhau;
- Santo António – the most populated civil parish in the municipality, developed from some initial sugar engine plantations, until the 16th century; today the population includes approximately 22,000 residents;
- São Gonçalo – initially settled by Gonçalo Aires, in service to João Gonçalves Zarco, the lands of the parish were once the personal domains of this settler;
- São Martinho – the highly urbanized area pertains to 20,000 inhabitants and includes the hotel zone of Funchal known as Lido (named after the Lido Bathing Complex);
- São Pedro – central to the business and residential character of Funchal, São Pedro is a bedroom community of Sé, with 7681 residents;
- São Roque – deannexed from Sé under the authority of Cardinal Infante Henriques, the prelate of Funchal constructed this parish from sections of São Pedro and São Martinho;
- Sé – the historical centre of Funchal, and most developed, including many of the older buildings; its population is less than 2148 residents (2001).

== Transportation ==
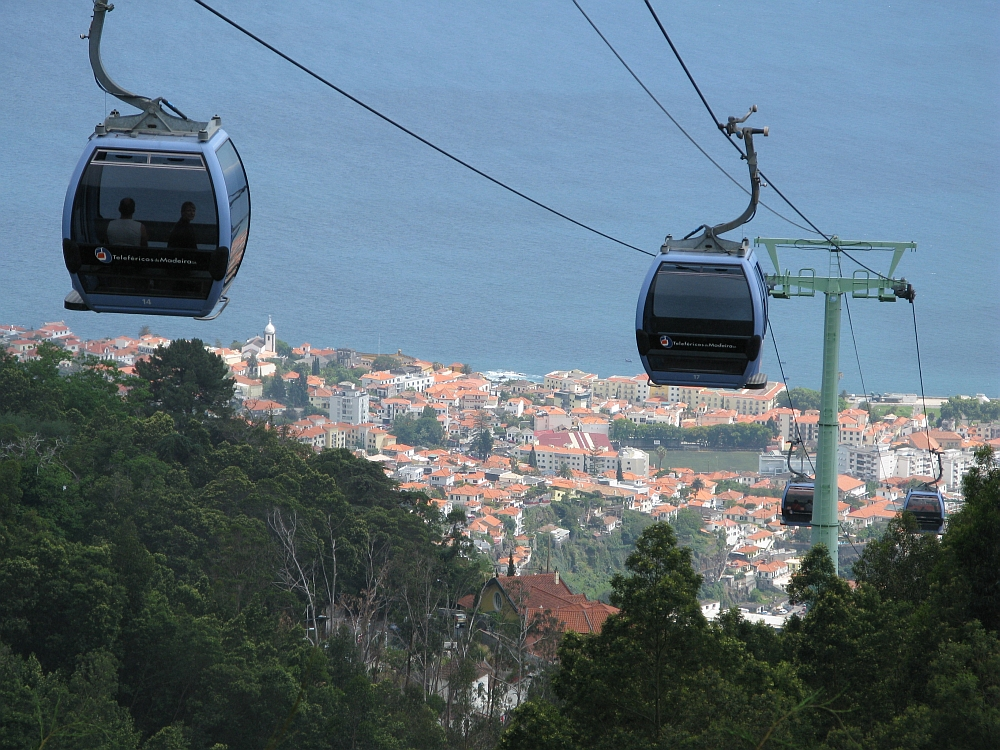
Famous cable car ride between Funchal and Monte, high up on Funchal's mountains

Madeira Airport, often known as Funchal Airport (code: FNC) and officially Cristiano Ronaldo International Airport, is located east of the city, in the municipality of Santa Cruz. The airport was one of the most dangerous airports in the world due to the limited flat terrain in close proximity to cliffs, but an extension of the runway on concrete pillars into the sea has improved safety. It served more than 5 million passengers as of 2024.

The Port of Funchal was the only major port in Madeira. From 2007 it has been dedicated to passenger transport (cruise ships and ferries) and other tourist-related boats and yachts. In 2017 all remaining fishing activity and cargo trade was moved to the newly developed port of Caniçal, 19 km (12 mi) to the east.

A ferry service between Funchal and Portimão, on the mainland, provided by Naviera Armas sailed weekly from 2008, but was discontinued in 2013 due to a dispute over harbour fees. In summer 2018 it was re-instated, but as a seasonal service from July to September, operated by Grupo Sousa using Naviera Armas's ship Volcán de Tijarafe, that provided the crossing prior to the 2013 discontinuation, with a maximum speed of 23 knots. The crossing takes around 24 hours.

A ferry takes two hours between Funchal and Porto Santo Island, called the Lobo Marinho. Funchal is frequently used as a stop-over by transatlantic ships, en route from Europe to the Caribbean, it is the northernmost Atlantic island that lies in the path of the Westerlies.

A highway provides access to Câmara de Lobos and Ribeira Brava to the west, and Santa Cruz, Machico and Caniçal to the east.

== Tourism ==
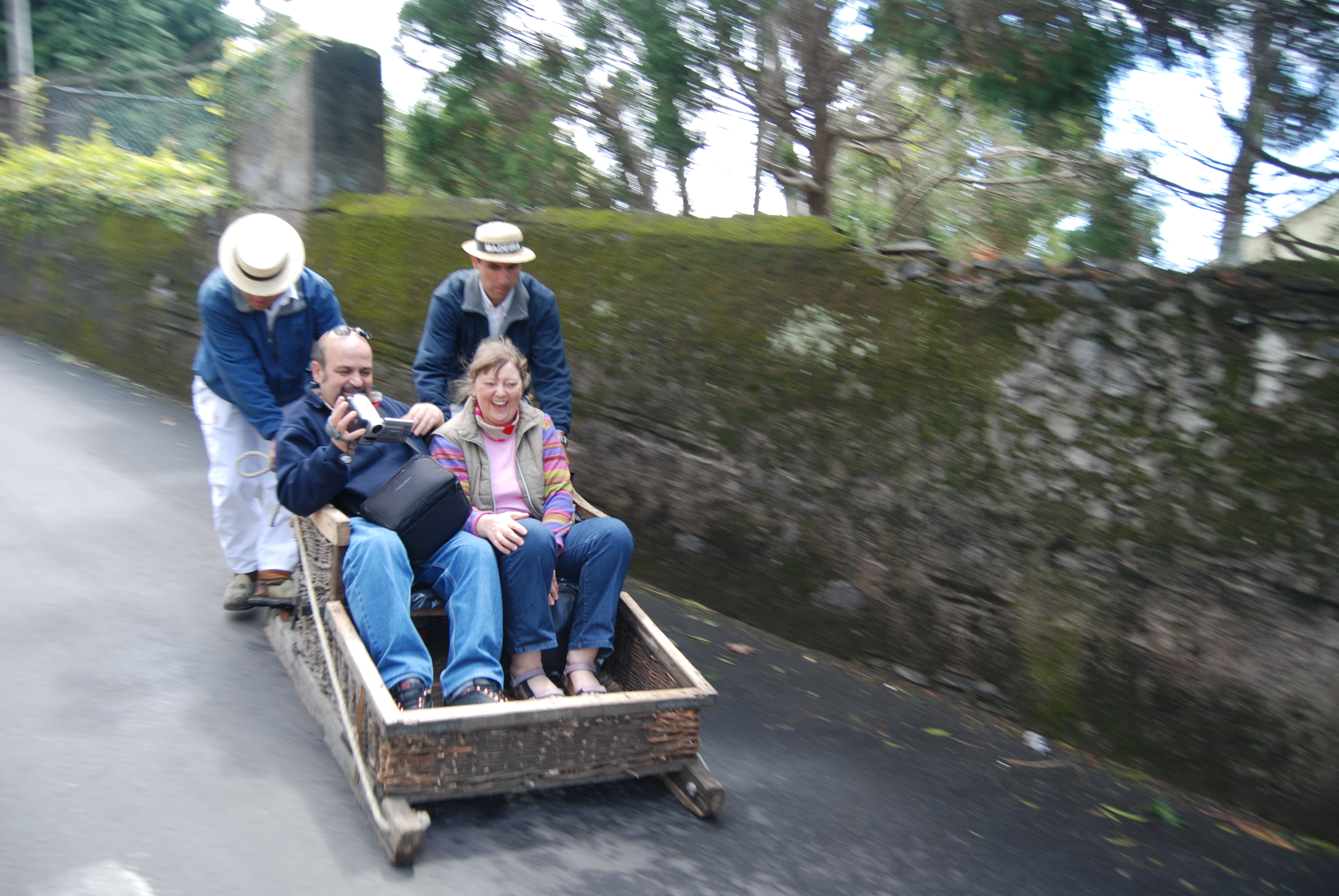
A toboggan ride going down Monte

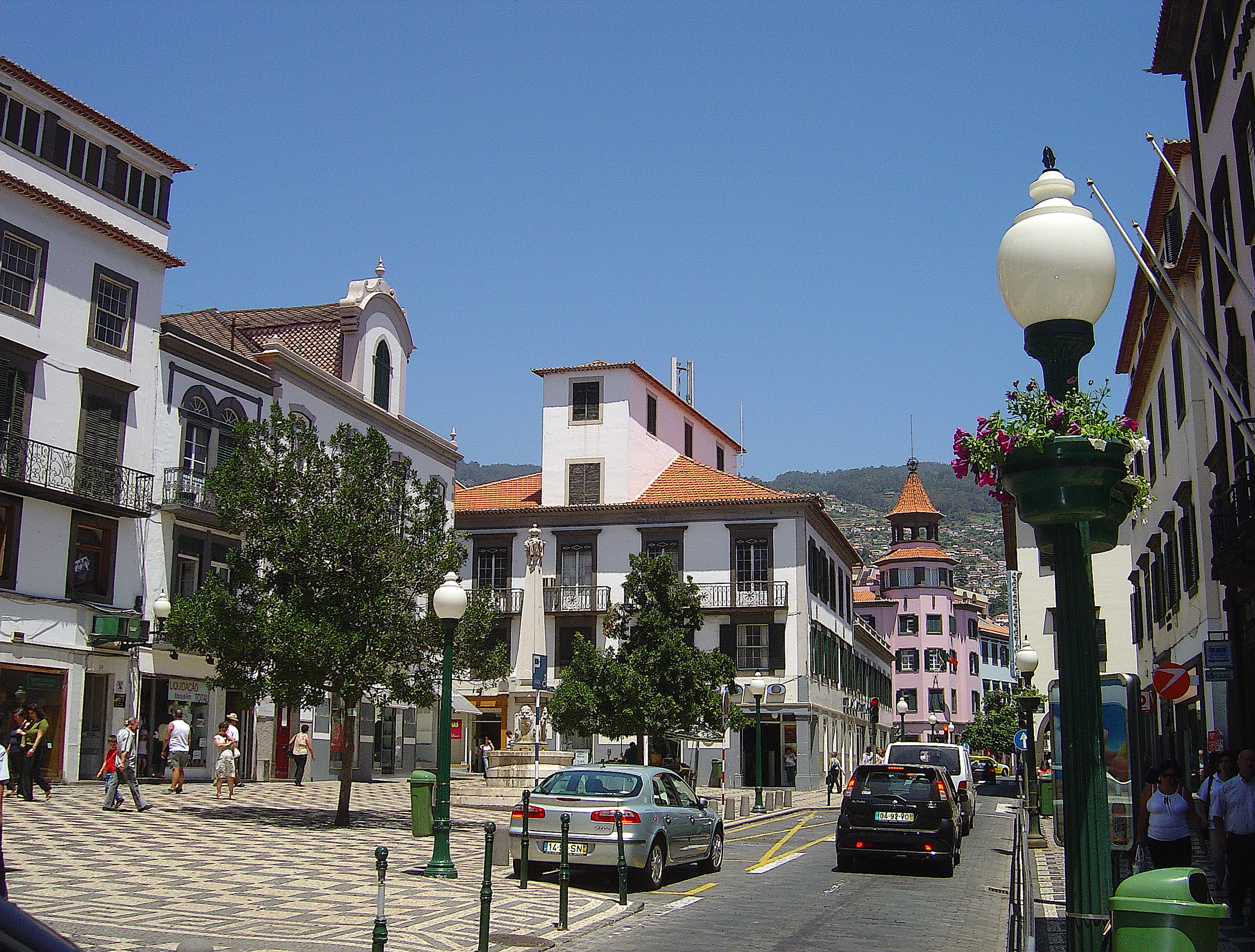
Aljube Street

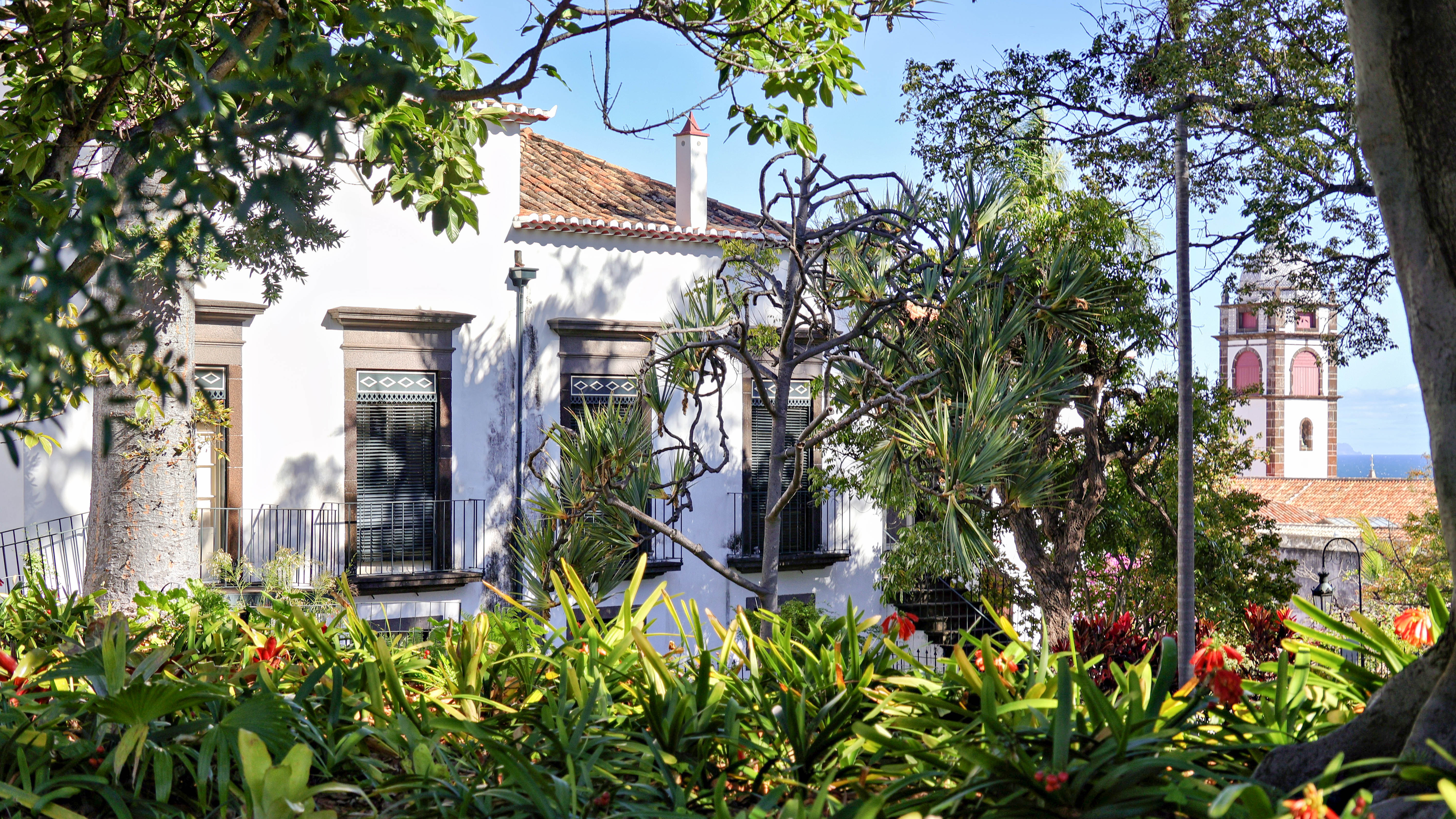
Quinta das Cruzes Museum

Funchal is a major tourist town, with hotels, a port, and an international airport Cristiano Ronaldo International Airport (FNC), located 18 km (11 mi) away in the nearby municipality of Santa Cruz.

Besides the city of Funchal, tourist destinations include: Ribeira Brava, Curral das Freiras, Porto Moniz, Santana, the Laurisilva forest, a UNESCO Natural Site, in the centre of Madeira Island and the beaches in Porto Santo island. There is also a passenger gondola lift (Funchal Cable Car), that transports people from the lower section of the city to the suburb of Monte and another that runs between Monte and the Botanical Gardens.

=== Museums ===
Funchal has many Museums:-

- Casa-Museu Frederico de Freitas
- Núcleo Museológico da Cidade do Açúcar
- Museu Barbeito
- Museu CR7 (Museum dedicated to Portuguese footballer Cristiano Ronaldo)
- Museu de Electricidade (Museum of Electricity)
- Museu de Arte Contemporânea do Funchal
- Sacred Art Museum of Funchal
- Museu de Fotografia – Vicentes
- Museu do Forte de S. Tiago
- Museu do Vinho da Madeira
- Museu Henrique e Francisco Franco
- Museu de História Natural do Funchal
- Museu Quinta das Cruzes
- Museu Sala de Troféus do Clube Sport Marítimo
- Núcleo Museológico do IVBAM
- Núcleo Museológico do Museu Militar Palácio São Lourenço
- Núcleo Museológico Mary Jane Wilson

== Religion ==
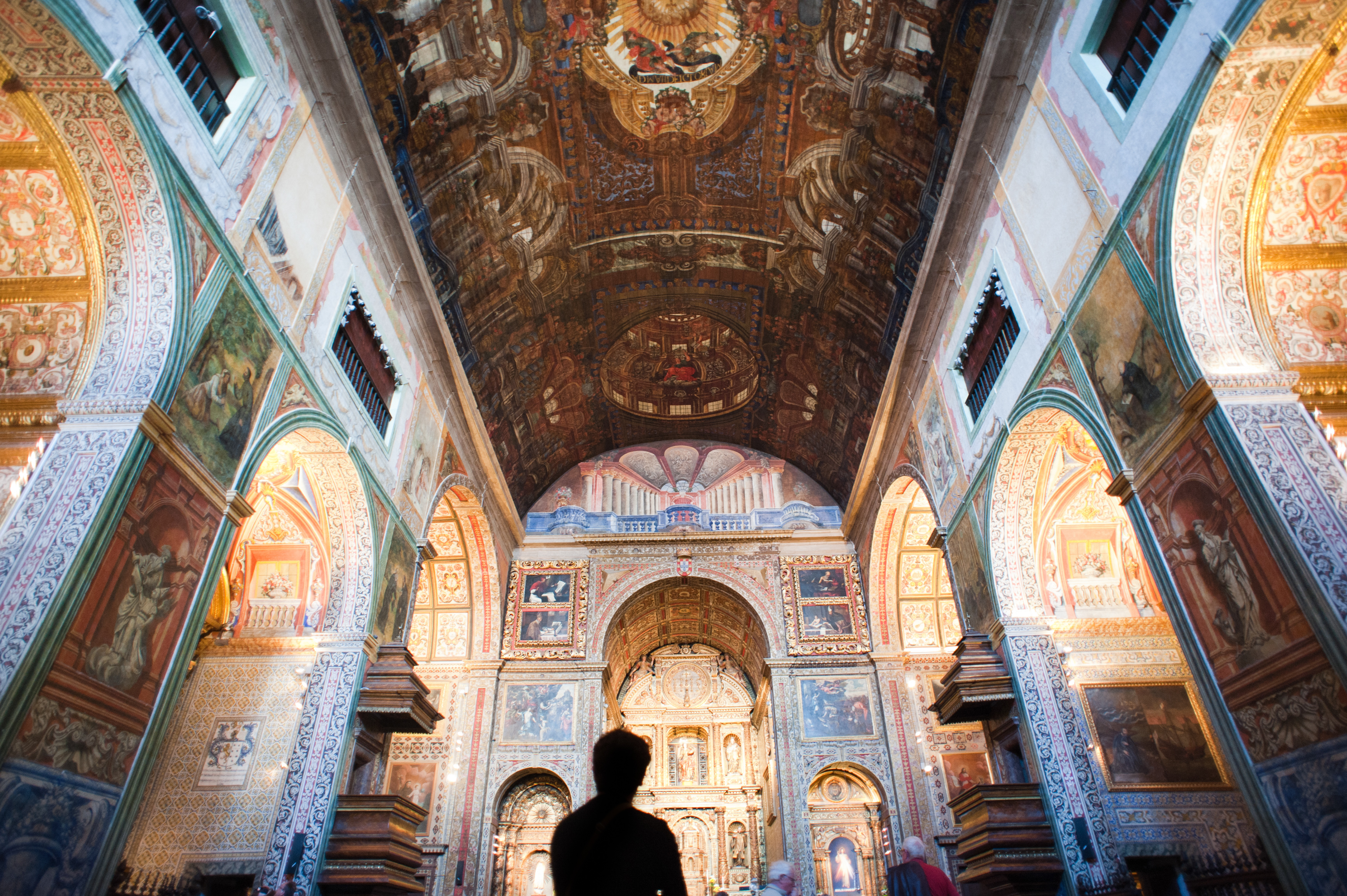
The Igreja do Colégio interior featuring Baroque architecture, Funchal's City Square

The Episcopal see (diocese) of the Roman Catholic bishop of Funchal includes the entirety of the Autonomous Region of Madeira, and is a suffragan see under the Archdiocese of Lisbon. Its focus is the Sé Cathedral, located in civil parish of Sé, dedicated to Nossa Senhora da Assunção (English: Our Lady of the Assumption) while its patron saint is Saint James.

Anglican services have been held at Holy Trinity Church in Funchal (Rua do Quebra Costas) since 1822, although the first recorded Protestant service took place in 1774. The Holy Trinity Church also takes care of the British Cemetery of Funchal.

Funchal Baptist Church was established in Madeira in 1976. It is located at Rua Silvestre Quintino de Freitas, and provides English services in the morning and Portuguese in the evening.

The Church of Jesus Christ of Latter-day Saints was established on Madeira in 1983. A few congregations have developed and a number of island converts have served missions off-island for the church in turn. Its main chapel in Lido was commenced in 1987 and dedicated a few years later.

The Synagogue of Funchal was built in 1836, but is now disused. There is the Jewish Cemetery of Funchal which is also disused.

== Sport ==
Funchal has two association football clubs: CS Marítimo, CD Nacional. Together they form the Madeira derby, which was first played in 1981 due to the teams being in different league levels for 7 decades. A third, CF União, also existed and contested the derby prior to its dissolution in 2021.

== Street art ==
Since 2011, the project "ArT of opEN doors project in Rua de Santa Maria" has been implemented in Funchal. The aim of the project is to open the city to artistic and cultural events. The project was born by the hand of many artists who coordinated with the city council and decided to take it out on the streets of the Old Town, particularly in the Rua de Santa Maria. The doors of houses, abandoned shops, deteriorated areas received a new life, in order to sensitize people towards the art and culture that fills these spaces.

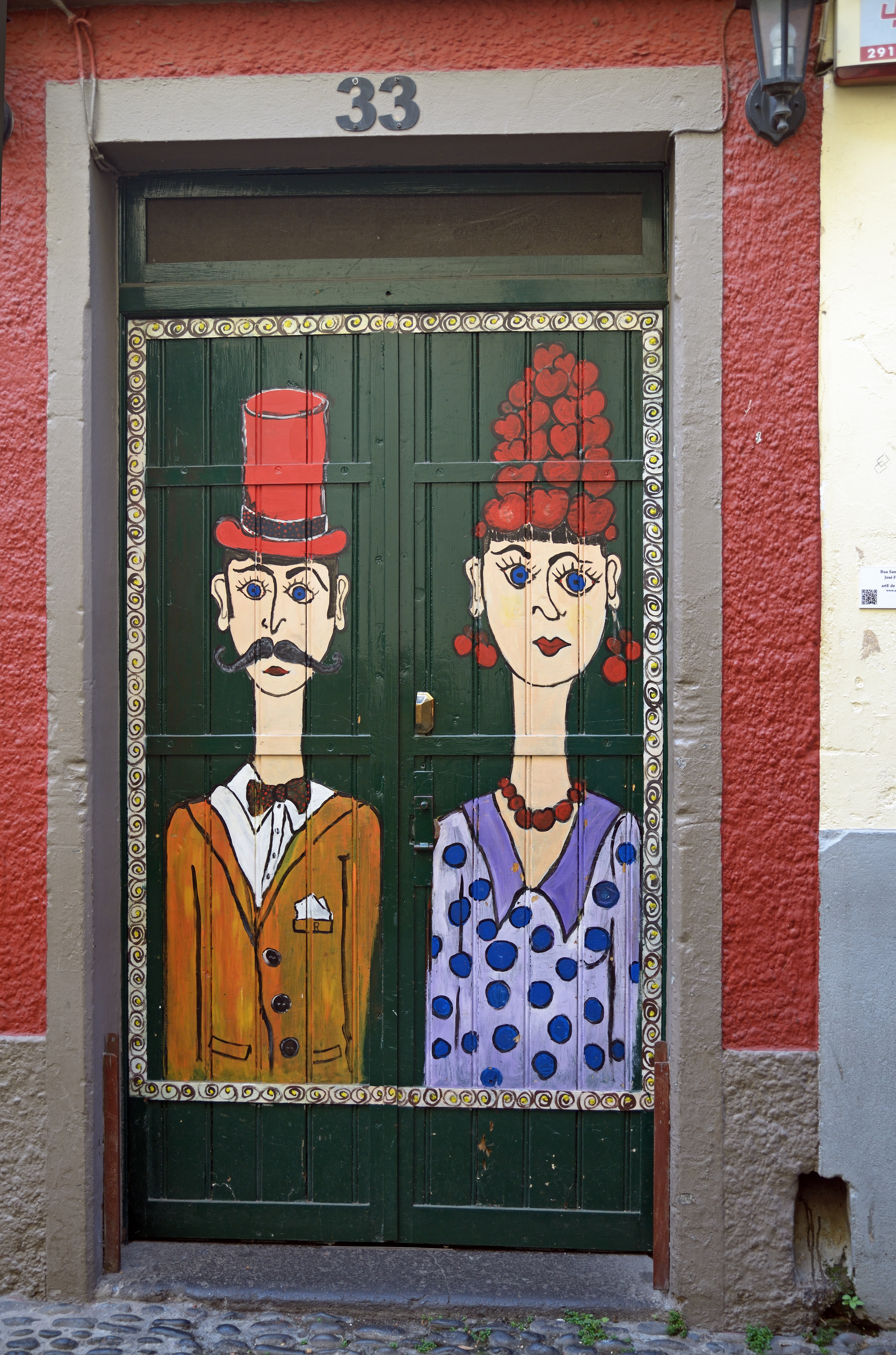

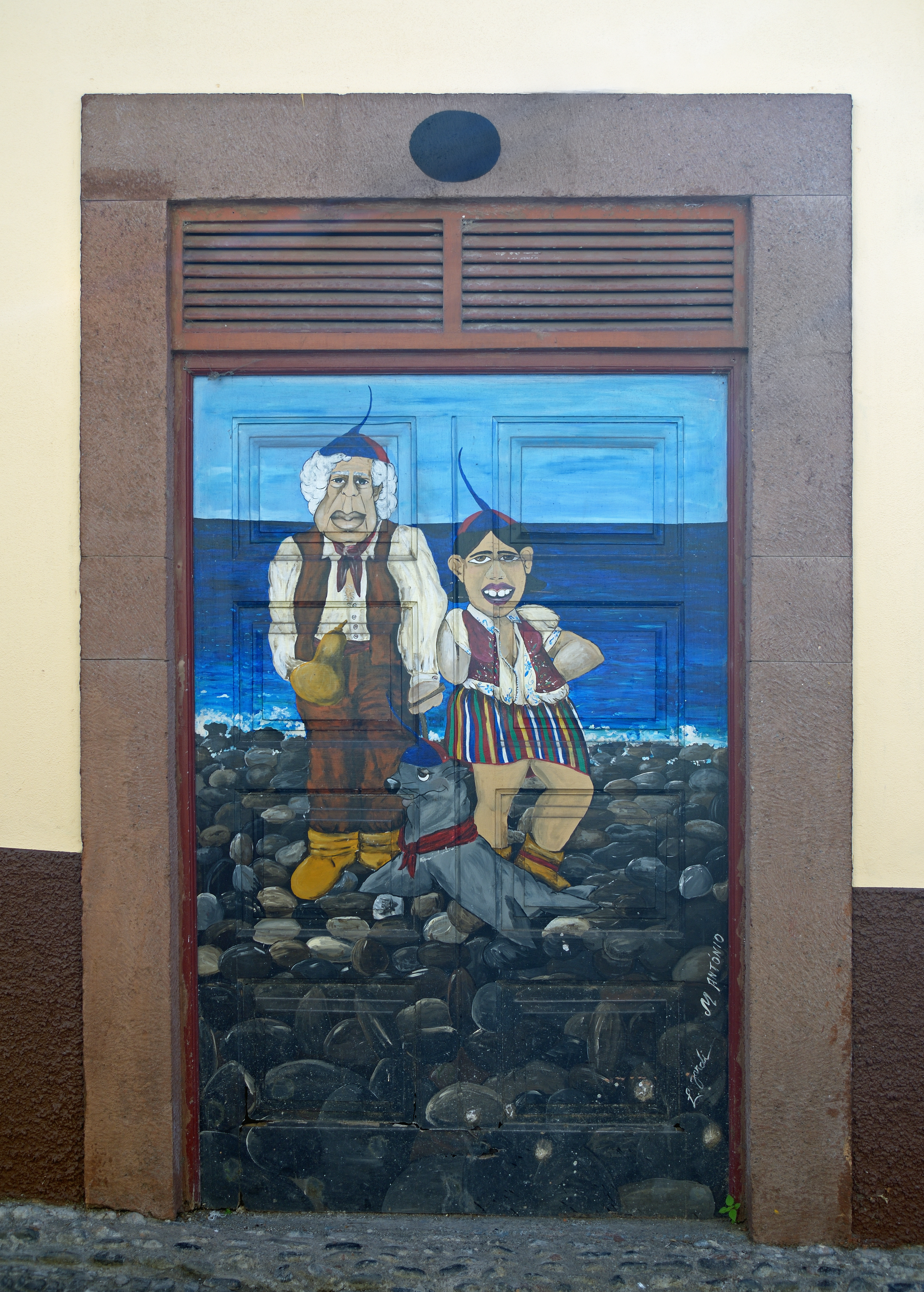

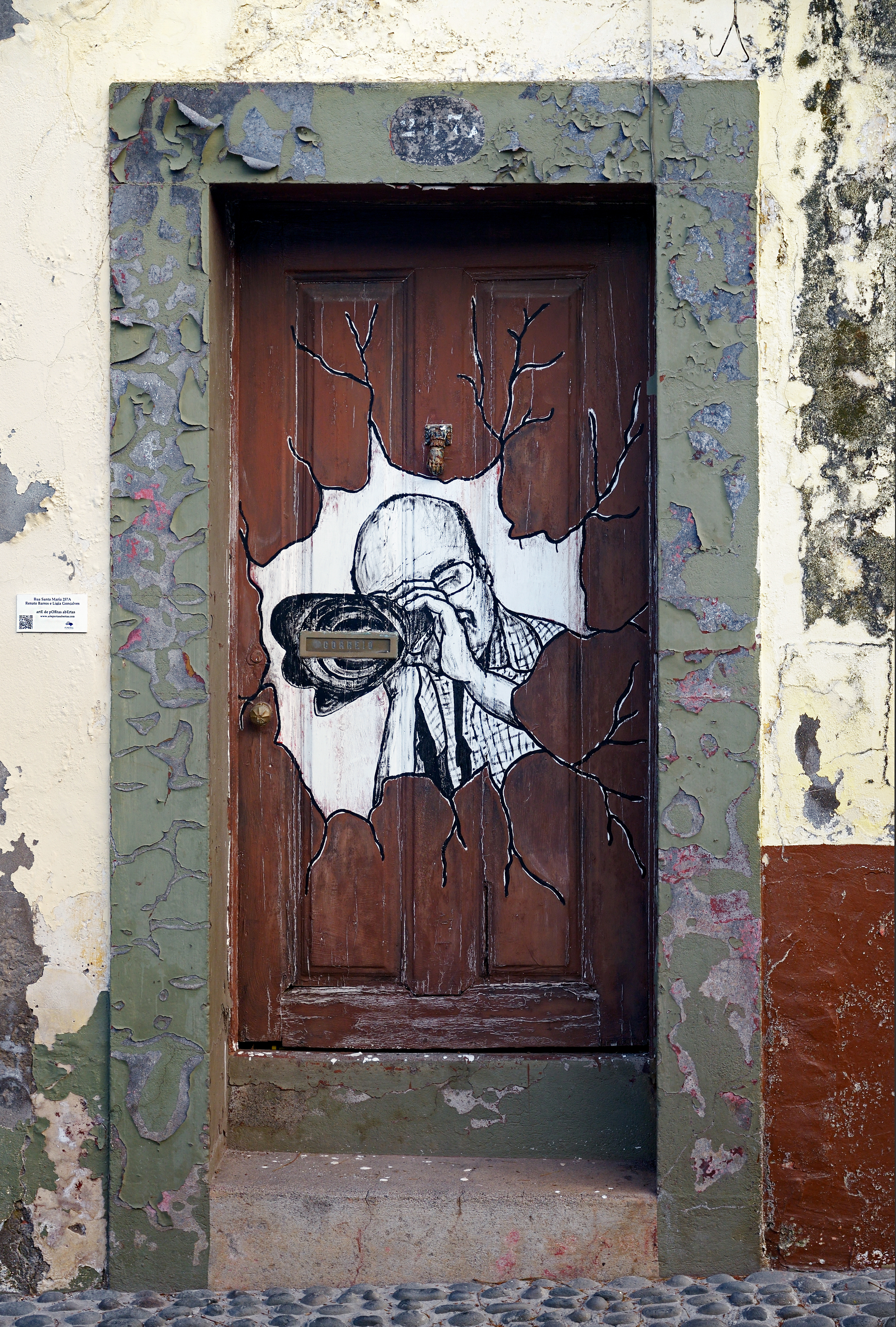

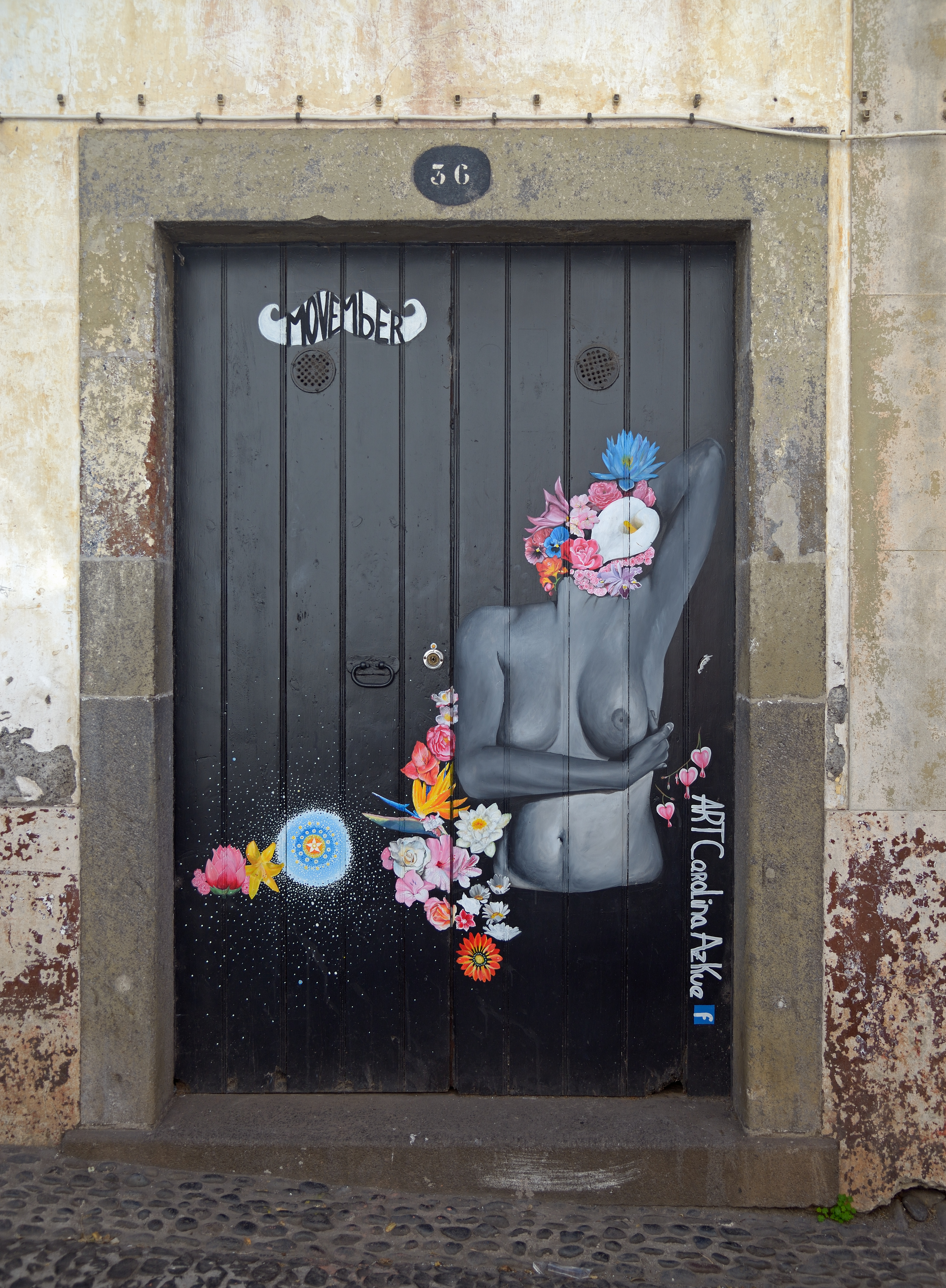

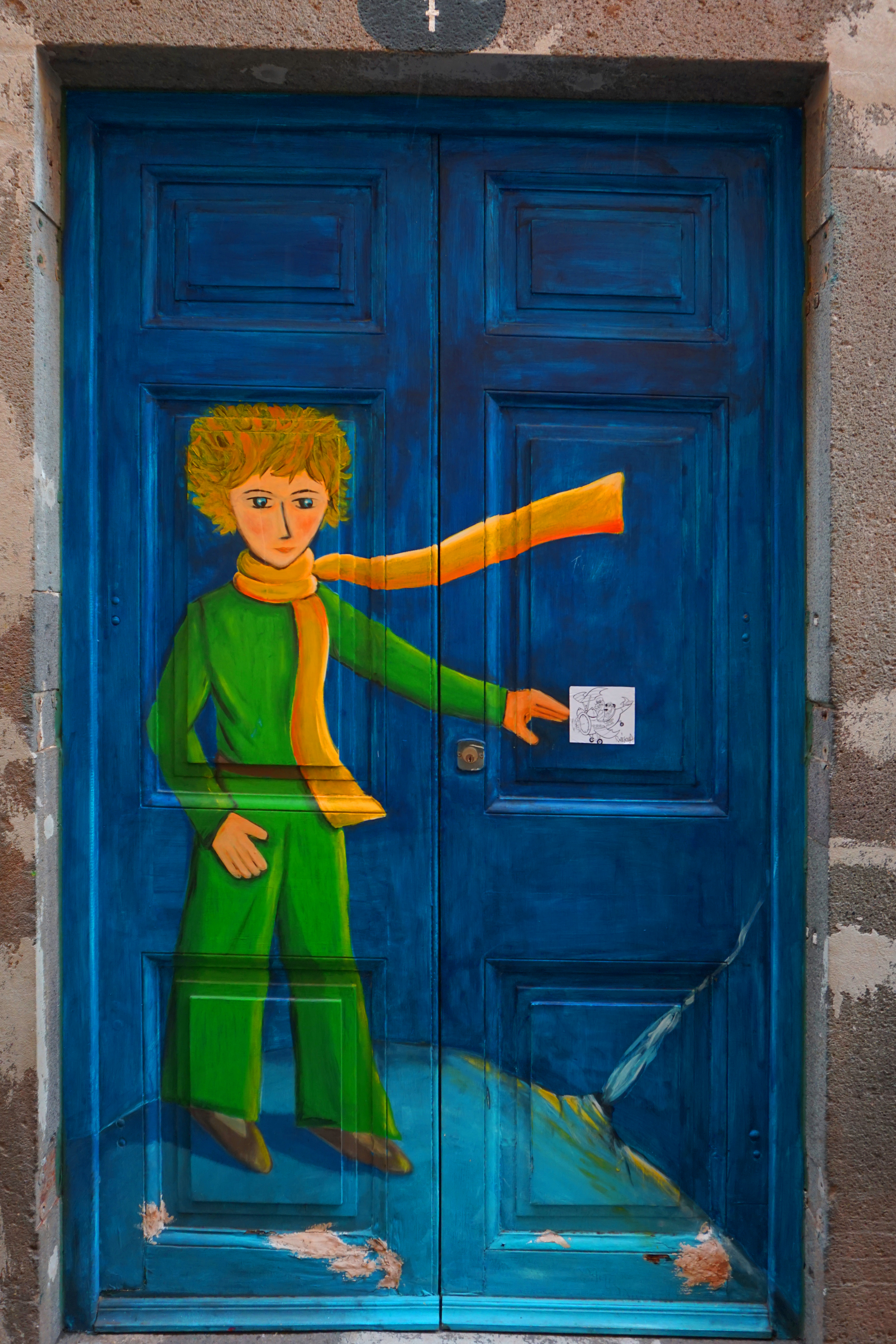

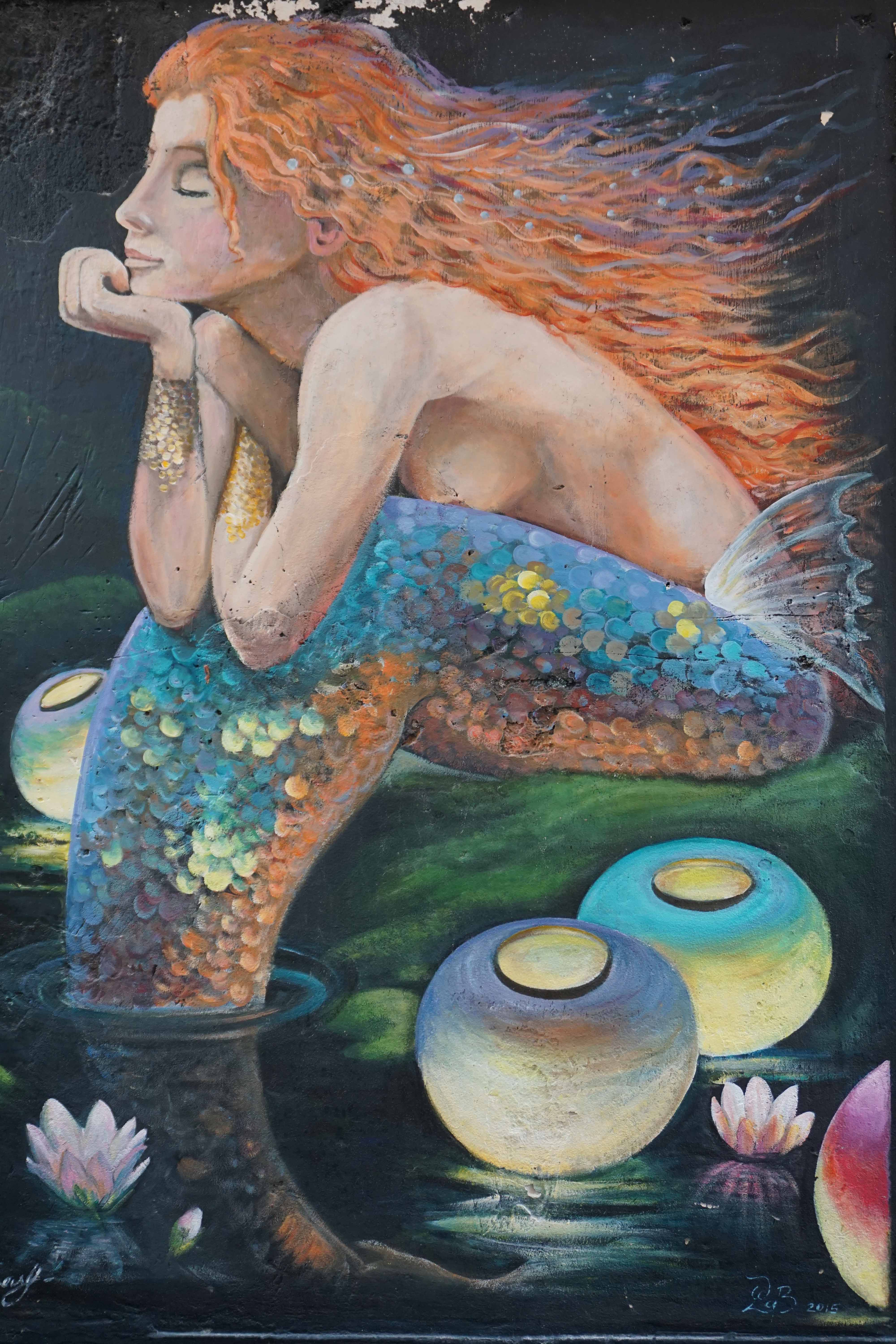

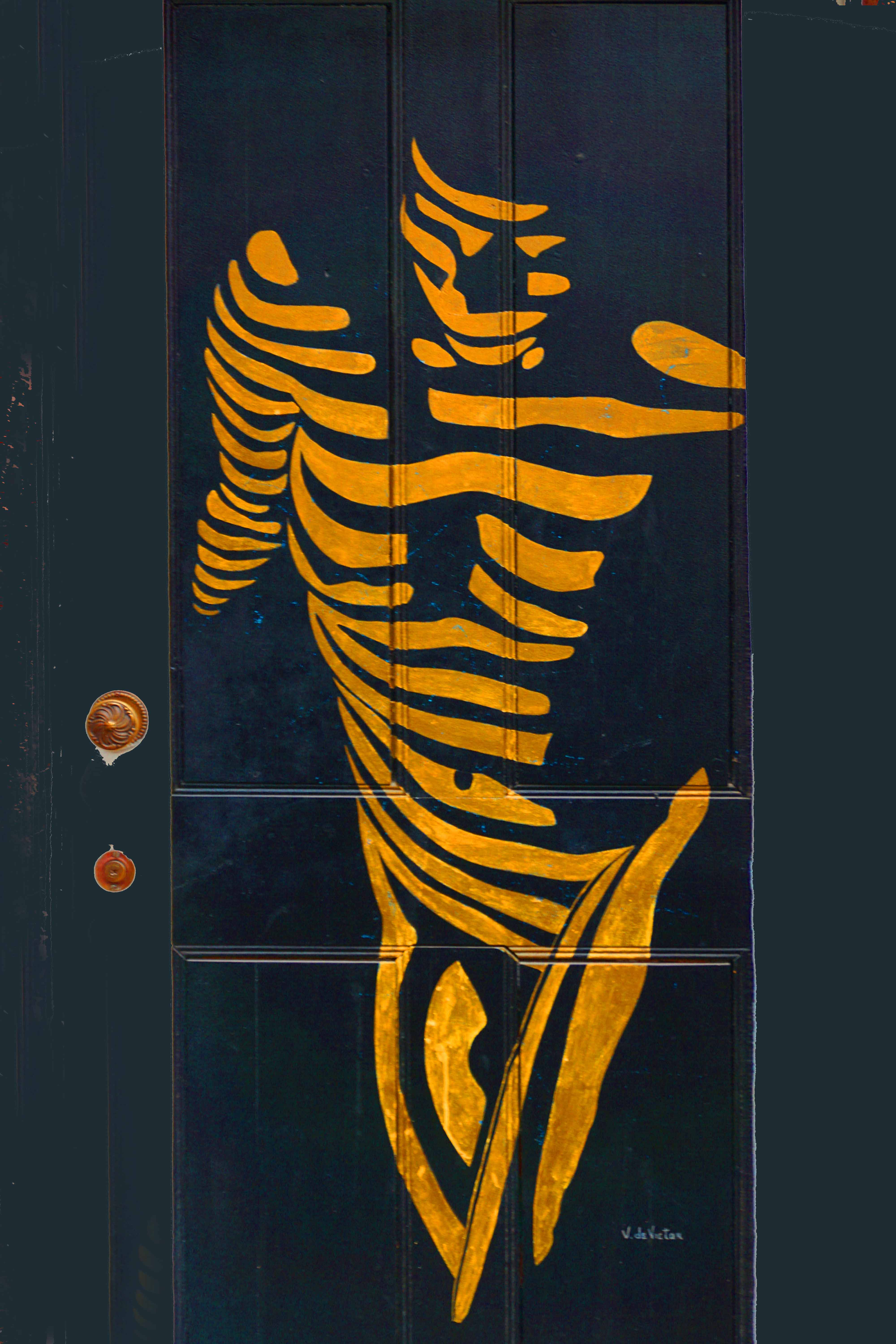

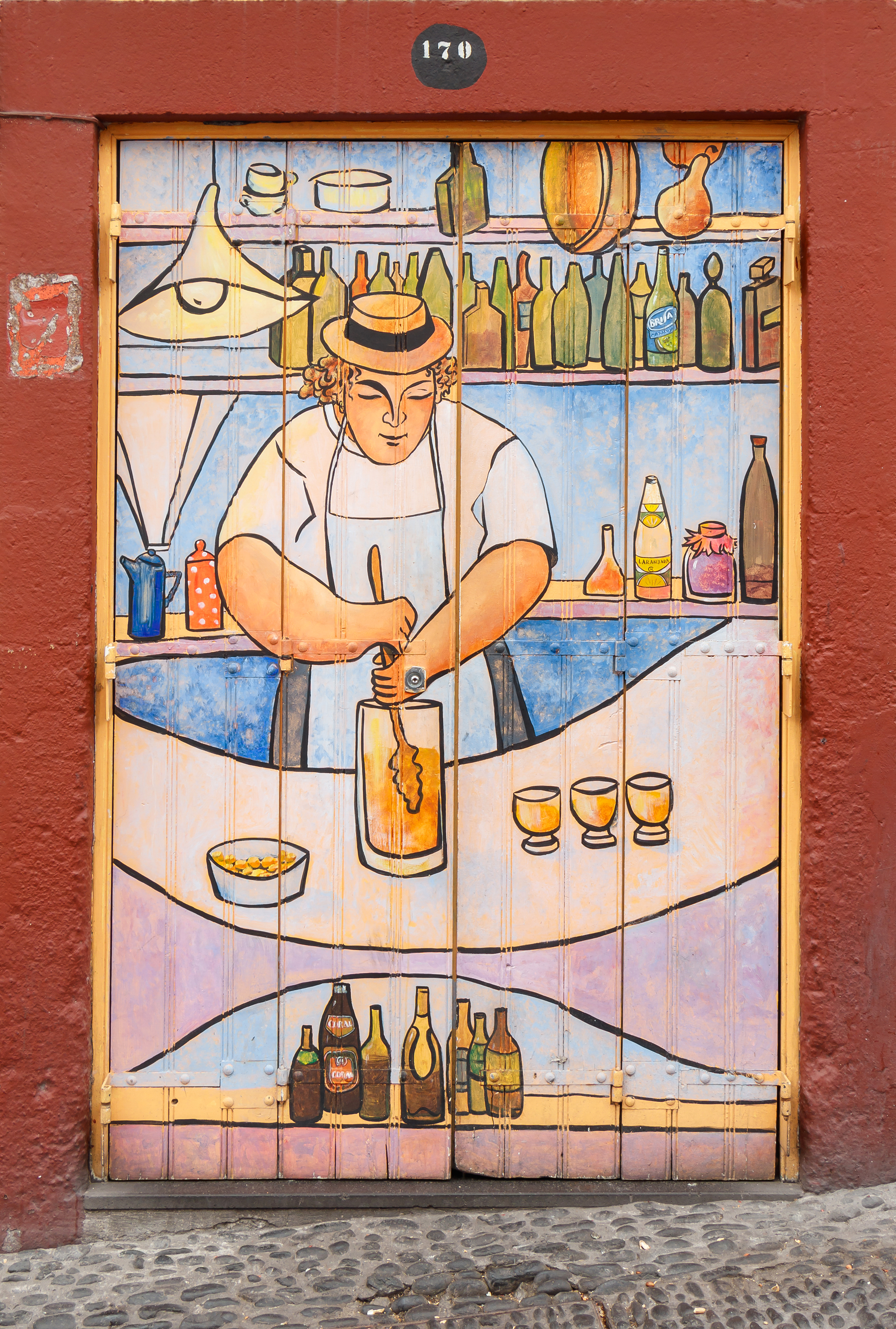

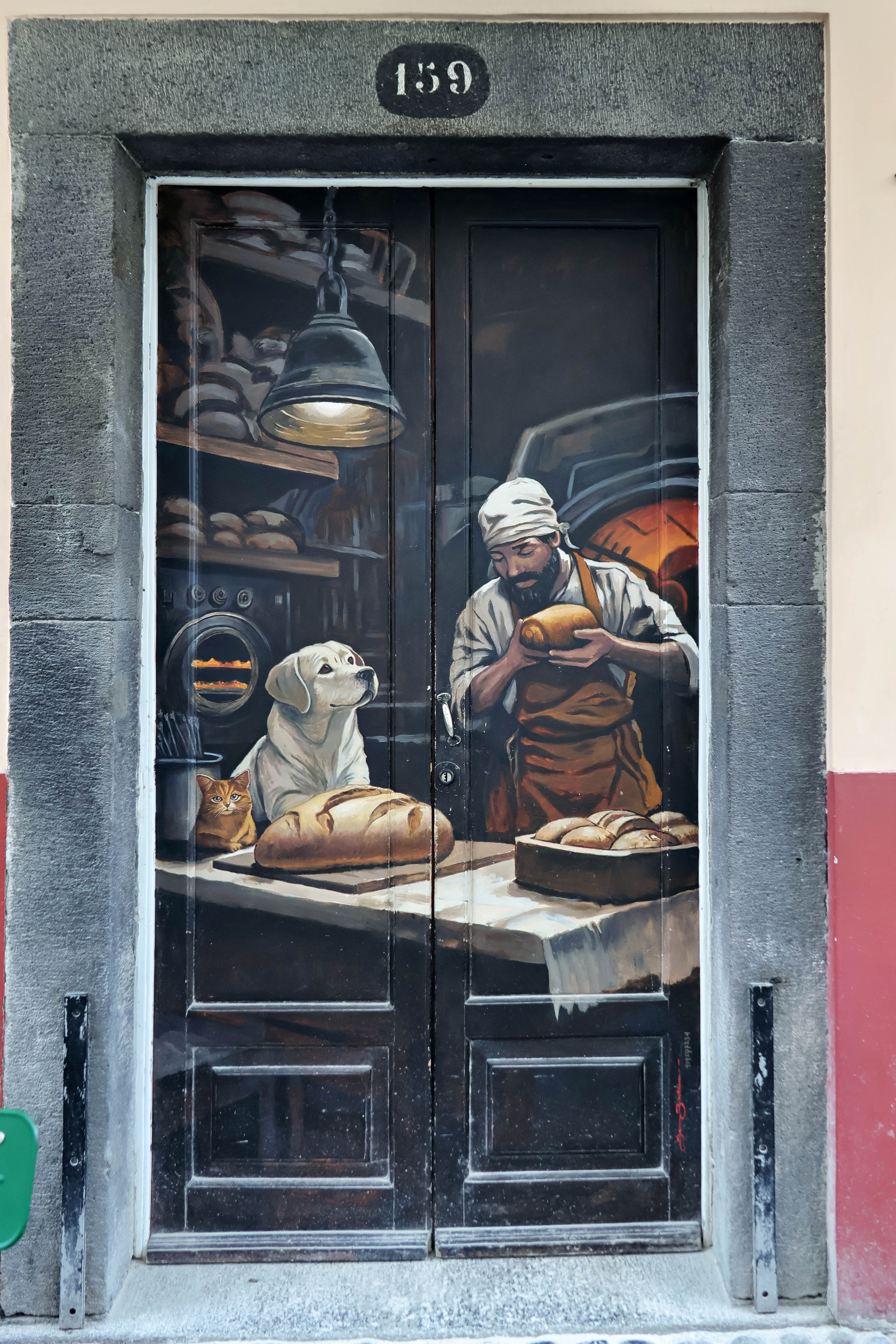

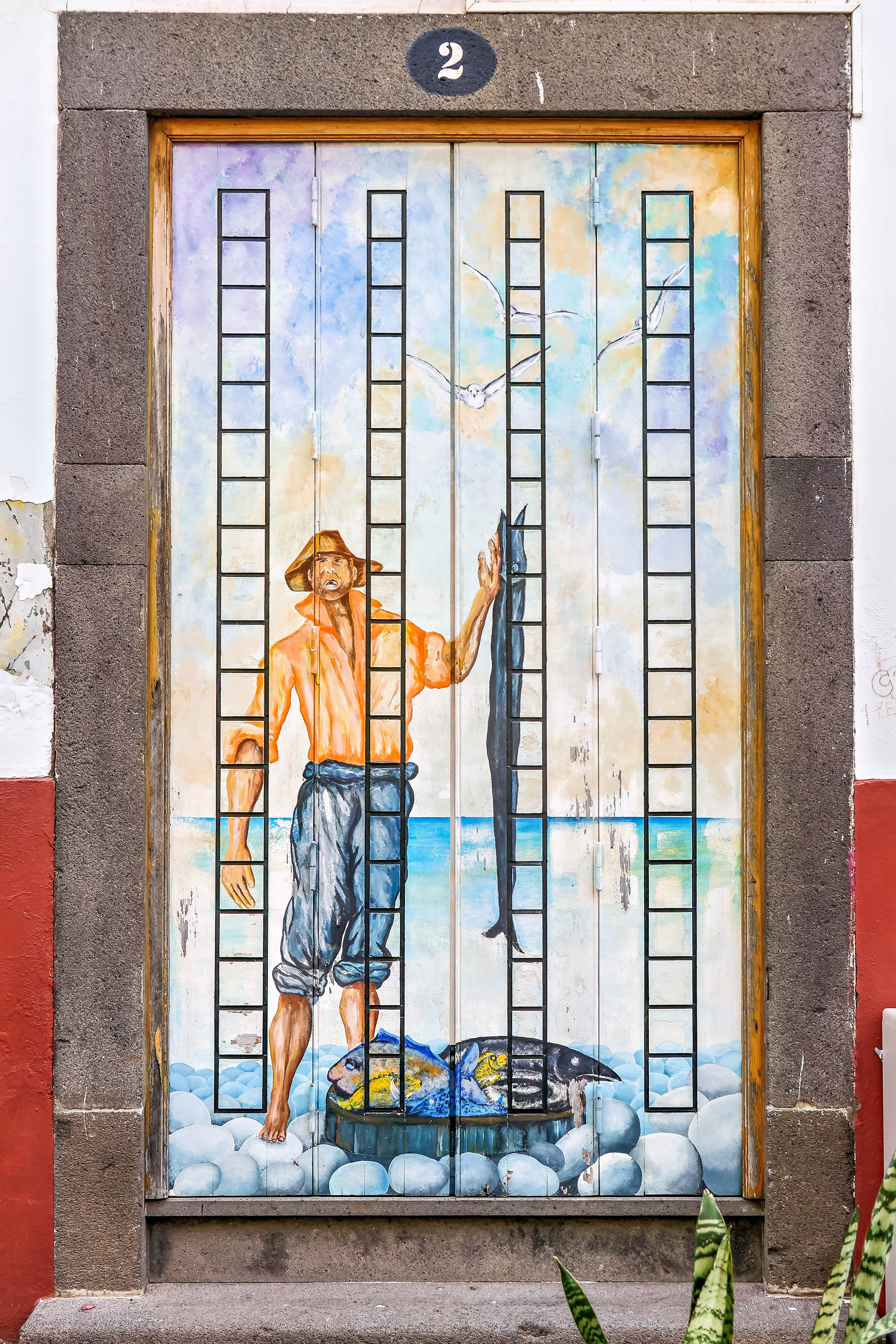

== Twin towns – sister cities ==
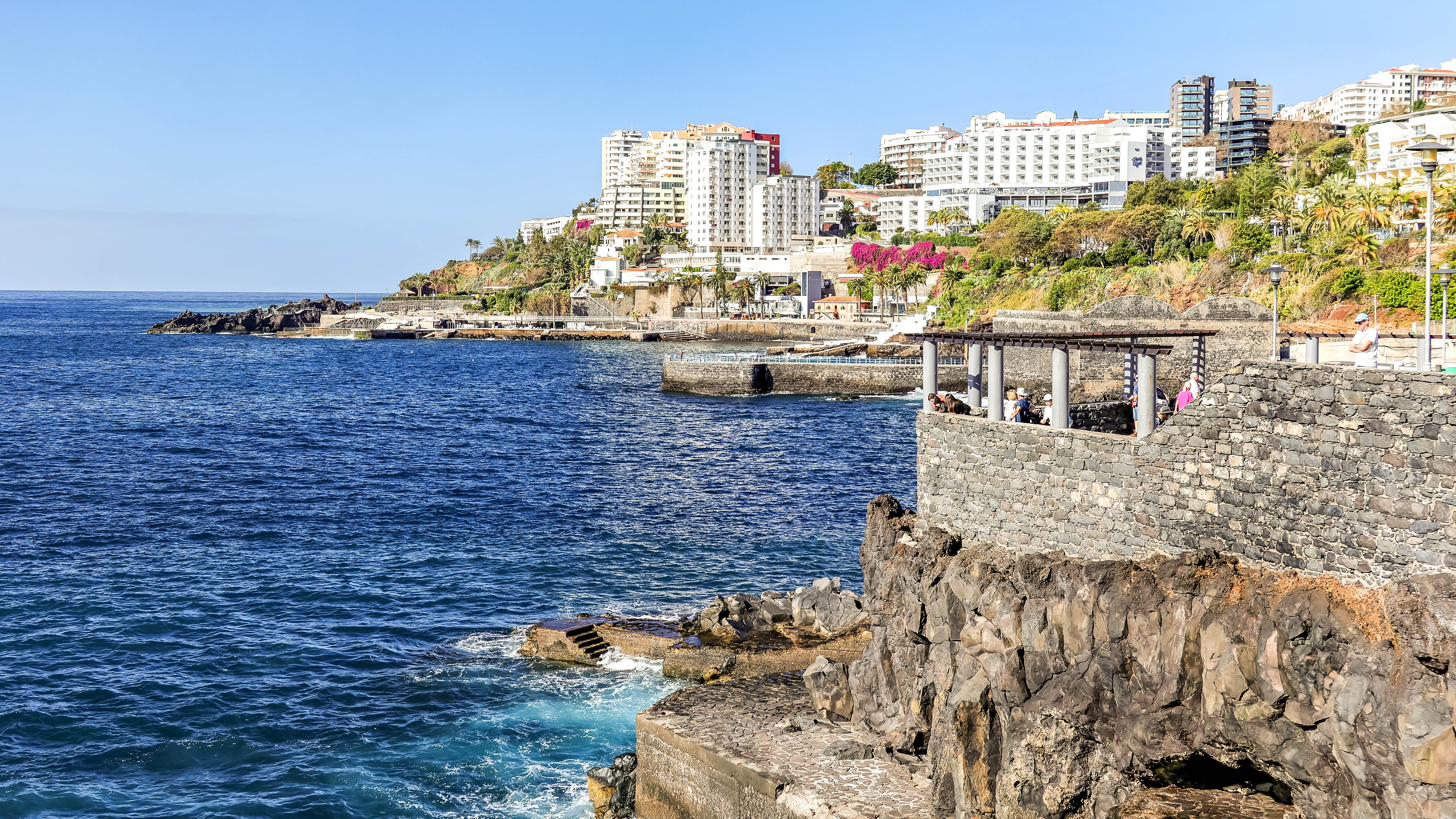
São Martinho, western zone of Funchal

Funchal is twinned with:

- Angra do Heroísmo, Portugal
- Cape Town, South Africa
- Fremantle, Australia
- Gibraltar, Gibraltar
- Herzliya, Israel
- Honolulu, United States
- Ílhavo, Portugal
- Leichlingen, Germany
- Livingstone, Zambia
- Marrickville (Inner West), Australia
- Maui County, United States
- New Bedford, United States
- Oakland, United States
- Praia, Cape Verde
- Saint Helier, Jersey
- Santos, Brazil
- Vigan, Philippines

== Notable people ==
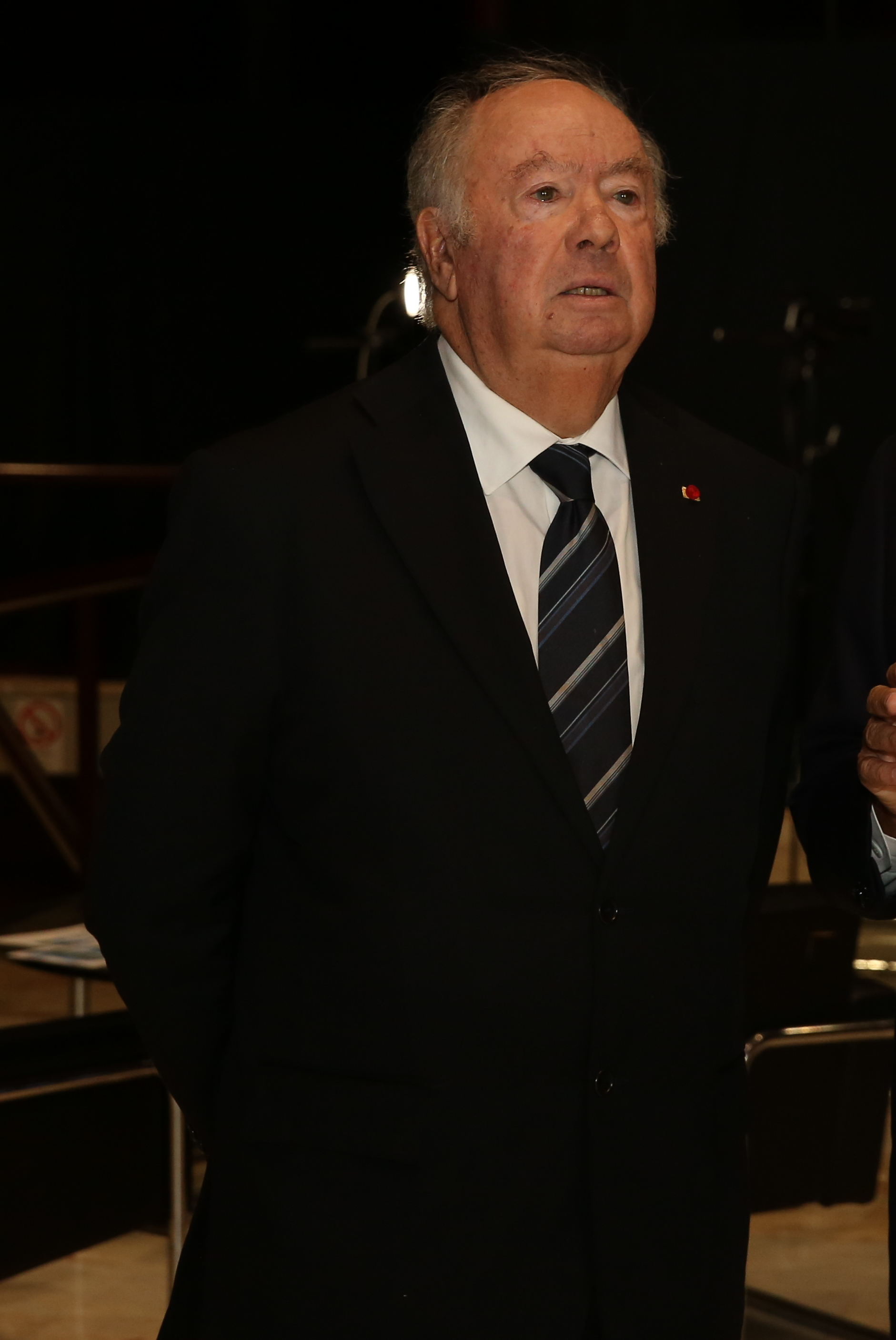
Alberto João Jardim, 2018

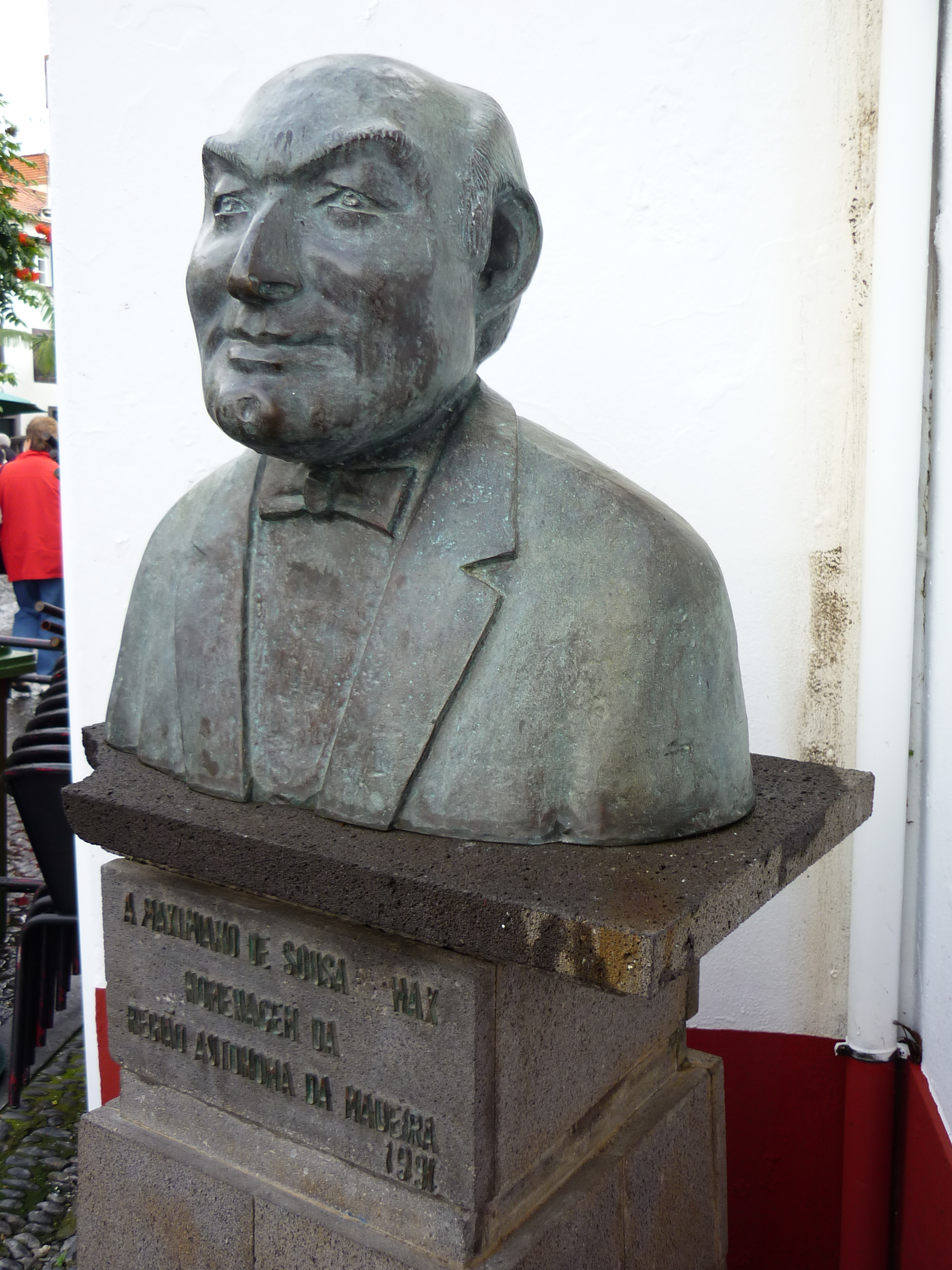
Maximiano de Sousa

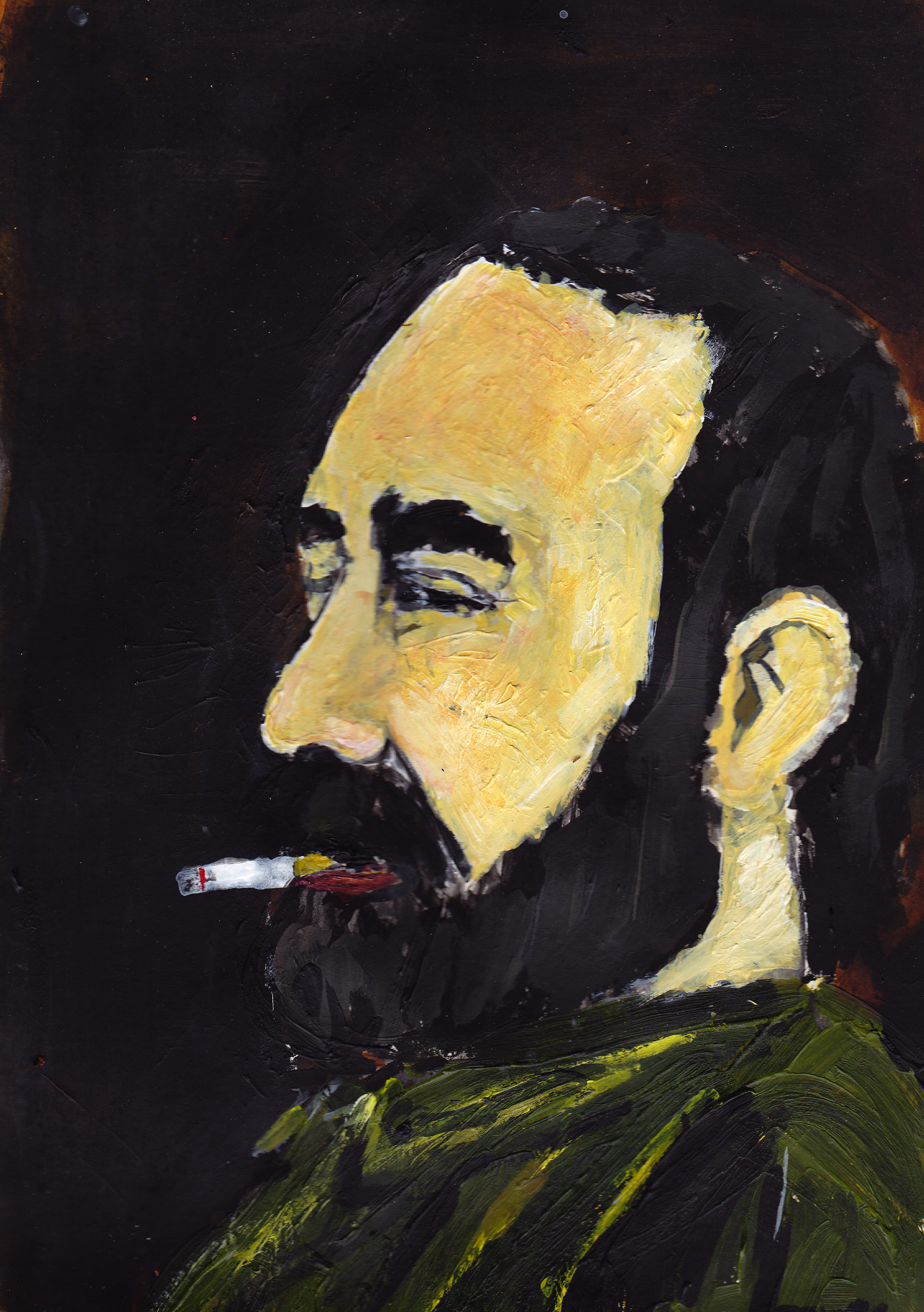
Herberto Helder, 2010

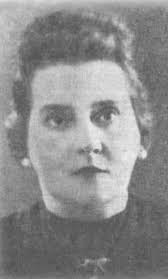
Leontina de Cabral Hogan

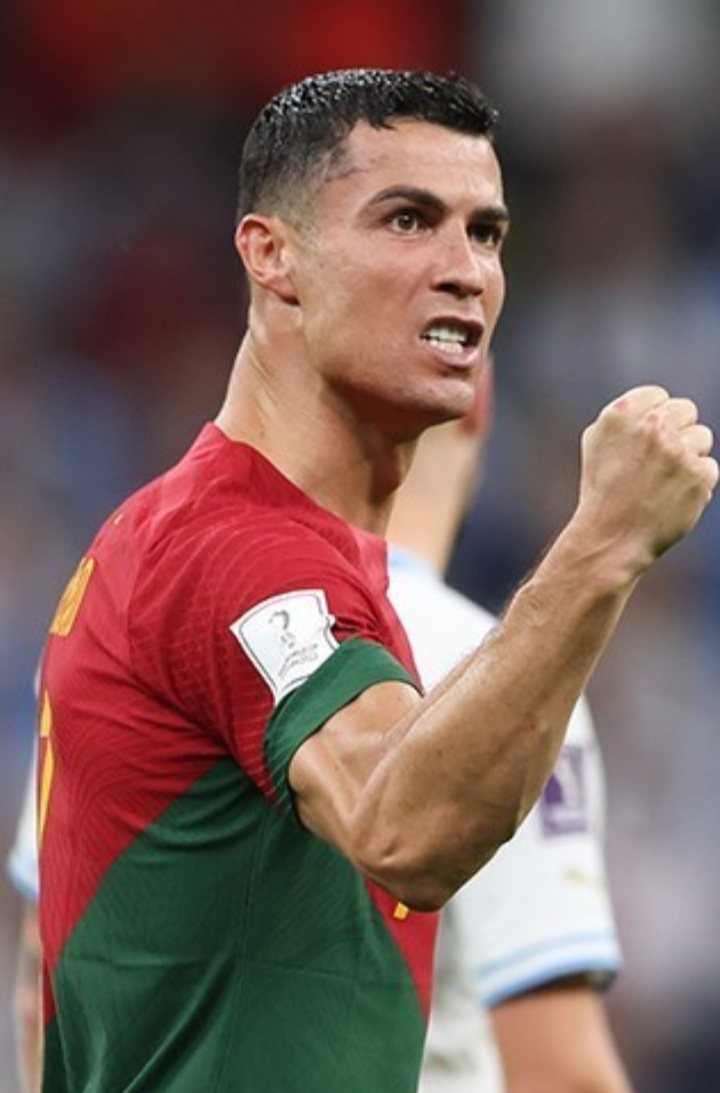
Cristiano Ronaldo, 2022

=== Public service ===
- Arsénio Pompílio Pompeu de Carpo (1792–1869), slave trader, freemason, poet and journalist
- James Yate Johnson (1820–1900), English naturalist, lived in Madeira from 1851
- José Vicente Barbosa du Bocage (1823–1907), Portuguese zoologist and politician
- Arthur Phelps (1837–1920), British civil engineer, homeopath and anti-vaccinationist
- Aires de Ornelas e Vasconcelos (1837–1880), Roman Catholic Archbishop of Goa
- Sarah Forbes Bonetta (1843–1880), goddaughter of Queen Victoria, died of tuberculosis
- Eliza Brown Newton Smart (1844-1930), President, Madeira Woman's Christian Temperance Union
- Sir Lloyd William Mathews (1850–1901), British naval officer, politician and abolitionist
- Charles, Count de Lambert (1865–1944), early European aviator
- Adolfo de Noronha (1873–1963), Portuguese naturalist
- Leontina de Cabral Hogan (1886–1943), medium and feminist
- Lourdes Castro (1930–2022), artist using abstract art, silk screens and shadow puppets
- Maria Teresinha Gomes (1933–2007), spent 20 years as a male army general
- Alberto João Jardim (born 1943), President of the Regional Government of Madeira, 1978–2015
- Joe Berardo (born 1944), Portuguese and South African businessman, and art collector
- Ilse Everlien Berardo (born 1955), German Lutheran theologian, responsible for the local German-speaking Protestant Church
- Humberto Barbosa (born 1961), Portuguese nutritionist
- Miguel Albuquerque (born 1961), politician, current President of the Regional Government of Madeira
- José Tolentino Calaça de Mendonça (born 1965) a prelate of the Roman Catholic Church & Cardinal of the Vatican Library & Vatican Apostolic Archive
- Berto Correia de Sousa (born 1972), Portuguese-Swiss bank manager in Zurich, noble roots
- Liliana Rodrigues (born 1973), politician and Member of the European Parliament
- Rubina Berardo (born 1982), Madeiran and Portuguese politician and pundit

=== Arts ===
- Viscondessa das Nogueiras (1805–1888), poet, author, and translator
- Jane Wallas Penfold (1820–1884), botanical artist
- Virgílio Teixeira (1917–2010), film, TV and stage actor
- Maximiano de Sousa (1918–1980), Portuguese singer, known as Max
- Herberto Hélder (1930–2015), Portuguese surrealist and experimental poet
- António da Cunha Telles (born 1935), Portuguese film director and producer
- Maria Aurora (1937–2010), journalist, poet, novelist, children's writer and TV presenter
- Nini Andrade (born 1962) interior designer and painter
- Fátima Lopes (born 1965), fashion designer
- Kátia Aveiro (born 1977), singer and sister of footballer Cristiano Ronaldo
- Pedro Camacho (born 1979), composer of classical and religious music and film scores
- Carlos Nóbrega (born 1979), singer, songwriter, actor, photographer and writer
- Fabio Machado (born 1985), Portuguese mandolin virtuoso
- Vânia Fernandes (born 1985), singer and 2008 Eurovision Song Contest competitor
- Giullia Buscacio (born 1997), Portuguese Brazilian actress
- NAPA (formed 2013), indie band, notable for their song "Deslocado"

=== Sport ===
- Cristiano Ronaldo (born 1985), footballer and longtime captain of the Portugal national team
- Artur de Sousa Pinga (1909–1963), footballer and later coach of FC Porto
- Marco Paiva (born 1973), retired footballer with 528 club caps
- Catarina Fagundes (born 1977), the first Portuguese female sailing athlete, entered the 1996 Summer Olympics
- Márcio Abreu (born 1980), Portuguese footballer with 505 club caps
- Rúben Andrade (born 1982), retired footballer with 491 club caps
- Moises Henriques (born 1987), Australian Portuguese cricketer Current Captain of Portugal National Cricket Team, moved to Australia aged one
- Marcos Freitas (born 1988), European Champion table tennis player
- Laura Luís (born 1992), football forward, with 49 caps for the Portugal women's team
- Fátima Pinto (born 1996), the first footballer from Madeira in a UEFA Women's Championship
- Telma Encarnação (born 2001), footballer who plays for the Portugal women's team

== See also ==
- History of Madeira
- Madeira wine
