= Santa Maria Maior (Funchal) =

- Civil parish
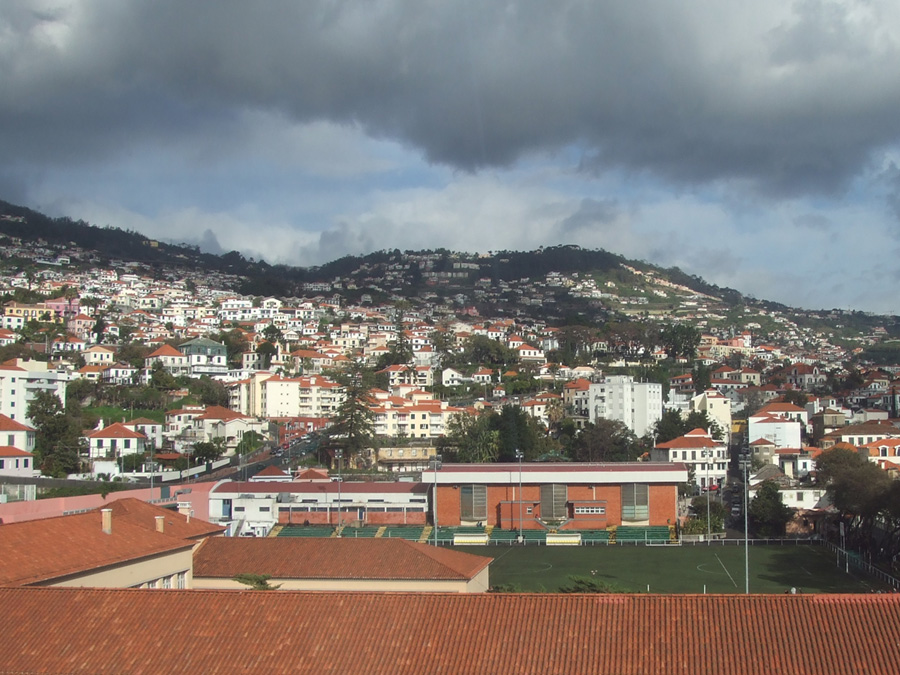
- The urbanized coastal buildings of Santa Maria Maior situated in a mountainous geography

- Location in Madeira
- Coordinates: 32°39′38″N 16°53′29″W
- Country: Portugal
- Auton. region: Madeira
- Island: Madeira
- Municipality: Funchal
- Established: Settlement: c. 1425; Parish: 18 November 1557; Civil parish: 25 April 1976

Area
  - Total: 4.86 km^{2} (1.88 sq mi)
- Elevation: 282 m (925 ft)

Population (2011)
  - Total: 13,352
  - Density: 2,750/km^{2} (7,120/sq mi)
- Time zone: UTC+00:00 (WET)
  - Summer (DST): UTC+01:00 (WEST)
- Postal code: 9060-199
- Area code: 291
- Patron: Santa Maria
- Website: www.jf-stamariamaior.pt

Santa Maria Maior (Portuguese meaning Saint Mary the Great) is a civil parish in the eastern part of the municipality of Funchal on the island of Madeira. The population in 2011 was 13,352, in an area of 4.86 km^{2}.

== History ==
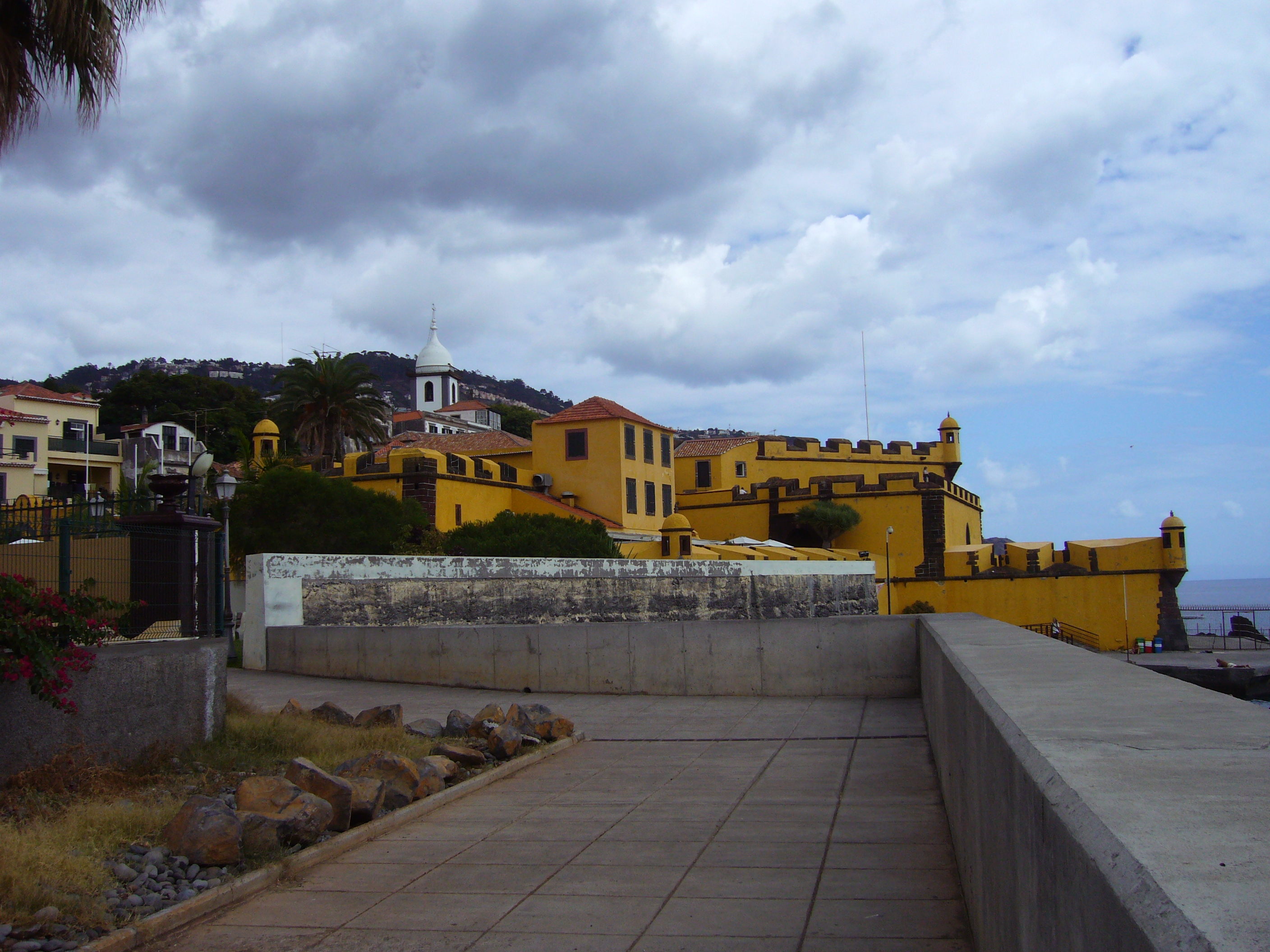
The walled fortifications of the Fort of São Tiago, built to protect the coast from piracy during the 16th-17th century

From the initial founding of Funchal, the island of Madeira was peppered with small settlements along the coasts near access to the sea. The settlement that would later take on the name of Santa Maria Maior developed spontaneously from the first homes constructed in 1425. This agglomeration extended from Ribeira do João Gomes until Corpo Santo, along the beachfront, and concentrated around a small temple constructed to the invocation of Santa Maria, or Santa Maria do Calhau as it was briefly known. Santa Maria do Calhau, constructed in 1430, served the congregations east of the bay of Funchal, and was also known as Nossa Senhora da Conceição de Baixo (English: Our Lady of the Conception), or simply Santa Maria Maior. The chapel was the seat of the parish of Santa Maria Maior until 1508, when the Church of the Sé Catedral was completed, and the parishioners were obligated to transfer there for services. Santa Maria Maior was the first parish to be instituted in Funchal. Its name was given, as some historians believe, because it was constructed in larger proportions than the chapel consecrated in the name of Nossa Senhora da Conceição ordered built by João Gonçalves Zarco (on the present site of the Church of Santa Clara). Zarco's chapel was known as Nossa Senhora da Conceição de Cima (meaning, geographically, top for its location), in opposition to Nossa Senhora da Conceição de Baixo (which means "bottom"), but referred to as Nossa Senhora do Calhau, because it was built on the coast (calhau is Portuguese for rock-covered beaches, typical of the Azores and Madeira).

The Church of Nossa Senhora do Calhau was destroyed, various times, by storm surges that battered the southern coast, eventually forcing many to concentrate in central Funchal, forming the central agglomeration of that municipality. Meanwhile, the construction of the Sé Catedral resulted in a dramatic population growth, and Santa Maria Maior lost its role as the parish seat to Sé. In 1557, Santa Maria Maior is divided into two individual parishes: Sé, seat in the Sé Cathedral and Santa Maria Maior, whose seat remained at the Church of Nossa Senhora do Calhau. On 18 November 1557, in accord with ecclesiastical authorities, the parish of Santa Maria Maior was established: its head was the vicar António Mourão.

Socially, the population was dominated by artisans and "men of office", although subsistence agriculture was important.

After an alluvial flood in 1803, that destroyed a great part of the Church of Nossa Senhora do Calhau, the parish seat moved to the Church of São Tiago (who had become the patron saint of Funchal). Finally, the ruins of the chapel were demolished in 1835, so that in its place (at the beginning of the Rua de Santa Maria Maior) was possible the construction of the Mercado da União (English: Union Market), which too was later removed in 1911.

In 1851 the Jewish Cemetery of Funchal was built in Rua do Lazareto, which still exists today.

In 1940 the Mercado dos Lavradores was opened.

Santa Maria Maior too was influenced by the evolution of the economic cycles, primarily wheat, sugar and wine, which developed the island in successive decades.

The administration of the parish remained under the ecclesiastical administration of the church, and through parish commissioners, who were later substituted by magistrates who were proposed by the municipal council.

== Geography ==
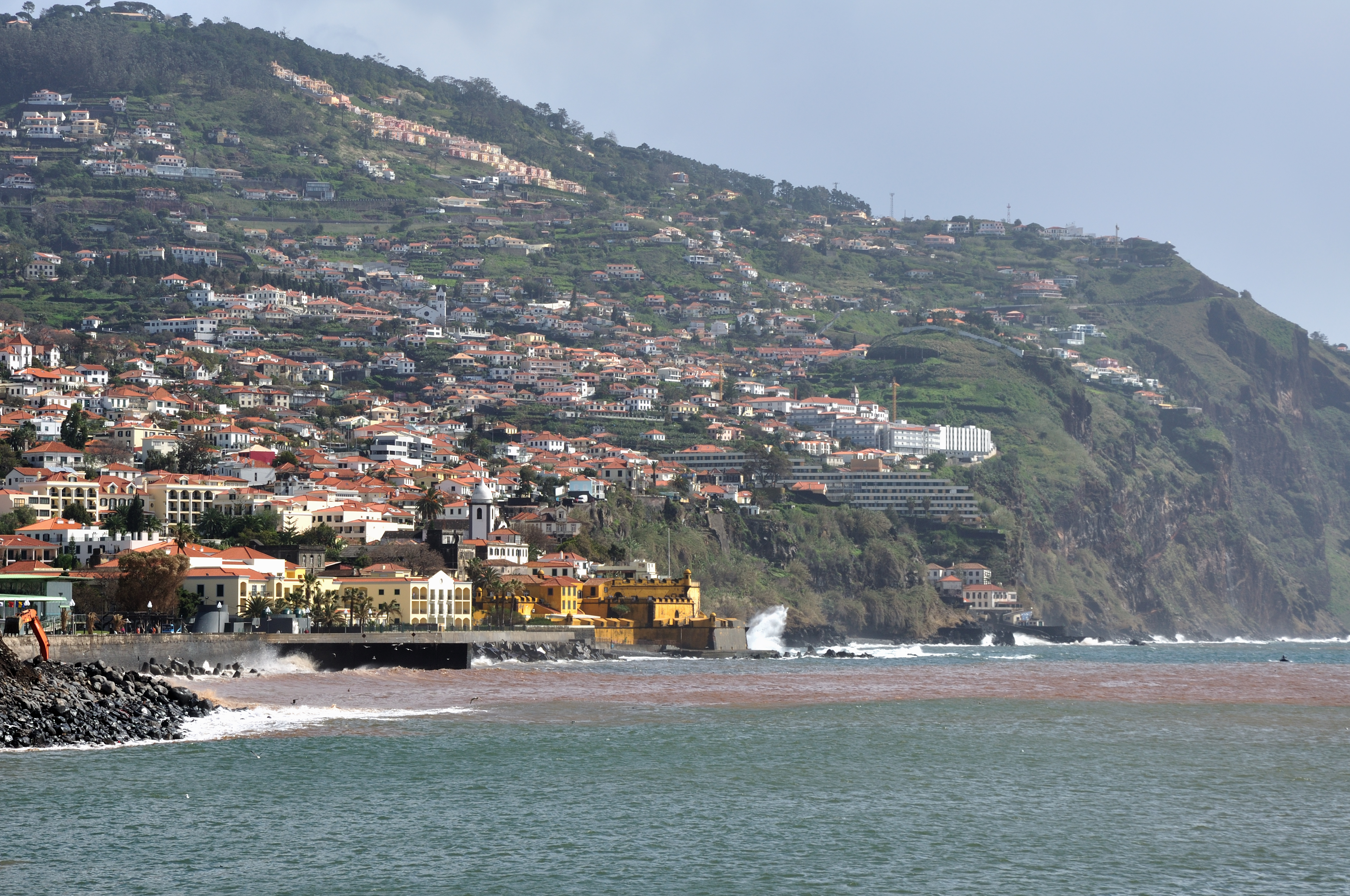
Santa Maria Maior, along the coast, showing the rugged escarpments of Madeira

It is located about 3 km east of the urban centre of Funchal, 4.5 km southwest Camacha and only 3 km west Caniço. The area is an urbanized section of the municipality of Funchal linked by ancillary roads to other sections of the island, as well as roadway that extends across the island. Until the mid-20th century, much of the interior of this parish was pasture and agricultural lands (central and western section), with denser forest in the northeast and northwest. The encroachment of urban housing, especially after the Carnation Revolution resulted in a transformation of this area into an ancillary bedroom community of Funchal.

== See also ==
- Quinta da Boa Vista orchid center
