= Sir William Cooke, 10th Baronet =

Sir William Cooke DL Bt
- Born: 21 June 1872
- Died: 11 June 1964

Sir William Henry Charles Wemyss Cooke, 10th Baronet (21 June 1872 – 11 June 1964) was a soldier, breeder of racehorses and orchid breeder.

He served as a lieutenant the East Kent Regiment and the Yorkshire Dragoons and held the office of High Sheriff of Yorkshire for 1903-1904. He moved from Wheatley Hall in 1911 to Ranby Hall in Lincolnshire, and after a period spent living in London he settled in Hampstead Norreys in Berkshire where he started an orchid collection at Wyld Court and became a pioneer of orchid breeding, in particular cymbidiums. Part of his collection was moved to the Quinta da Boa Vista on Madeira by his daughter while remainder became known as Wyld Court Orchids, which in turn become the Living Rainforest park.

Baronetage of England
Preceded by William Cooke	Baronet (of Wheatley Hall); 1894–1964	Succeeded by Charles Cooke
