= Quinta da Boa Vista (Madeira) =

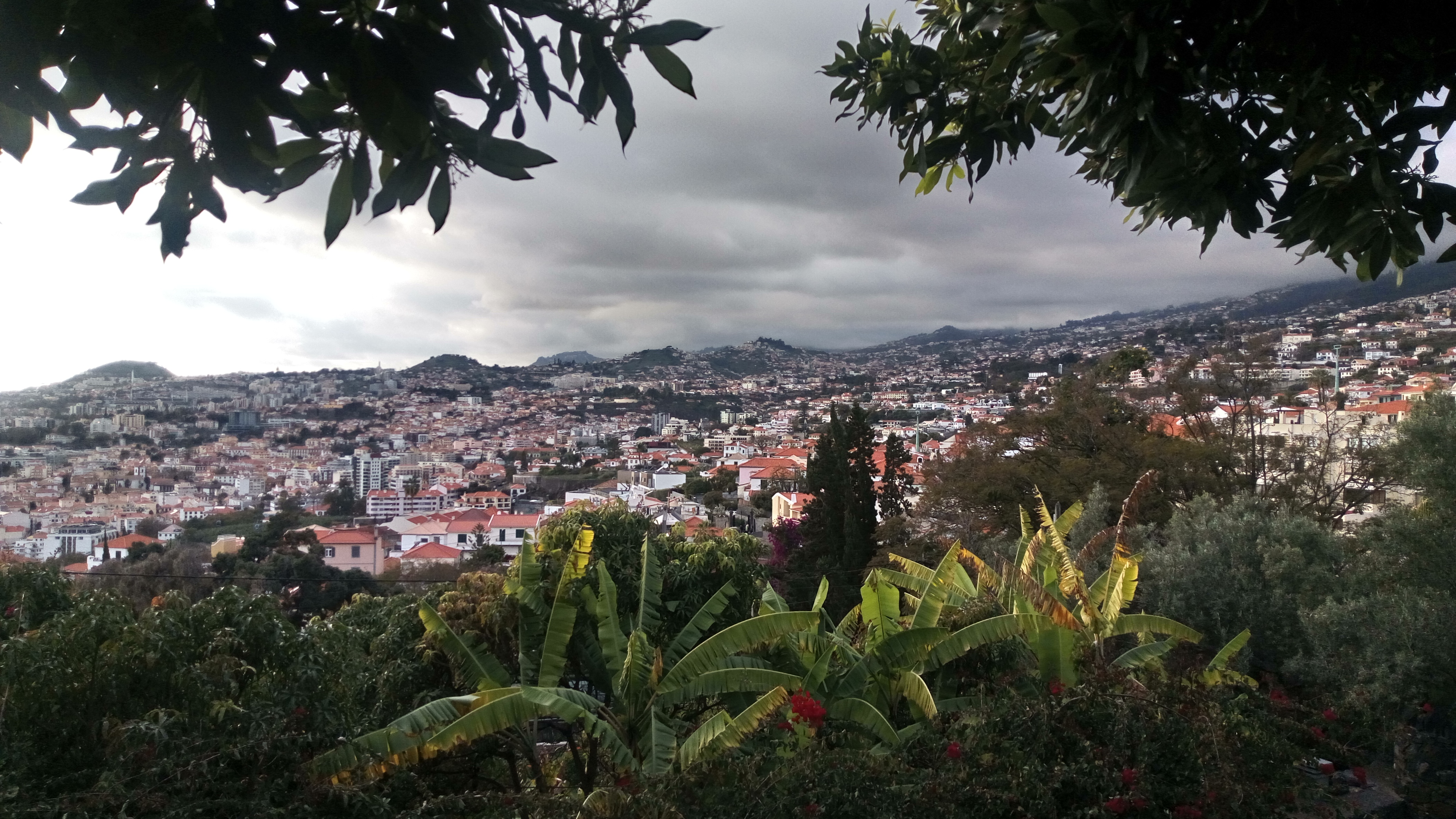

- Location within Madeira
- 32.653073°N 16.896291°W
- Location: Rua Lombo da Boa Vista 19A; 9060-173 Funchal, Madeira

History
- Built: 19th century

Site notes
- Elevation: 112 m (367 ft)
- Owner: The Garton Family

The Quinta da Boa Vista is a historic quinta ('estate') and orchid garden in the Santa Maria Maior parish of Funchal on the island of Madeira, overlooking the central and western parts of Funchal. It contains one of the last remaining walled stair terrace gardens of Funchal and continues to draw its water from the levada irrigation system. It was built some time during the late 18th and early 19th century, appearing on Trigo's 1910 Planta Roteiro Cidade do Funchal 1910 map for the first time.

== Quinta da Boa Vista Orchid Garden ==
After having been converted to a market garden and then a flower farm, the quinta was eventually acquired by the Garton family in the 1860s, and in the 1960s, after his retirement from the Royal Air Force Group Captain Cecil Garton OBE converted it into a site for growing and breeding orchids together with his wife Elizabeth Hera 'Betty' Garton, daughter of a pioneer of orchid breeding, Sir William Cooke. When Betty inherited her father's orchid collection, she brought part of the collection to Madeira (the site in Hampstead Norreys later become an orchid centre called Wyld Court Orchids which in turn became the Living Rainforest) and continued growing and breeding orchids, increasingly also for conservation purposes. Today her son Patrick, who graduated from Oxford University with a degree in botany, continues to run the quinta and the Quinta da Boa Vista Orchid Garden has become a popular tourist attraction and one of Madeira's most important orchid collections.

Orchids and other plants at the Quinta da Boa Vista
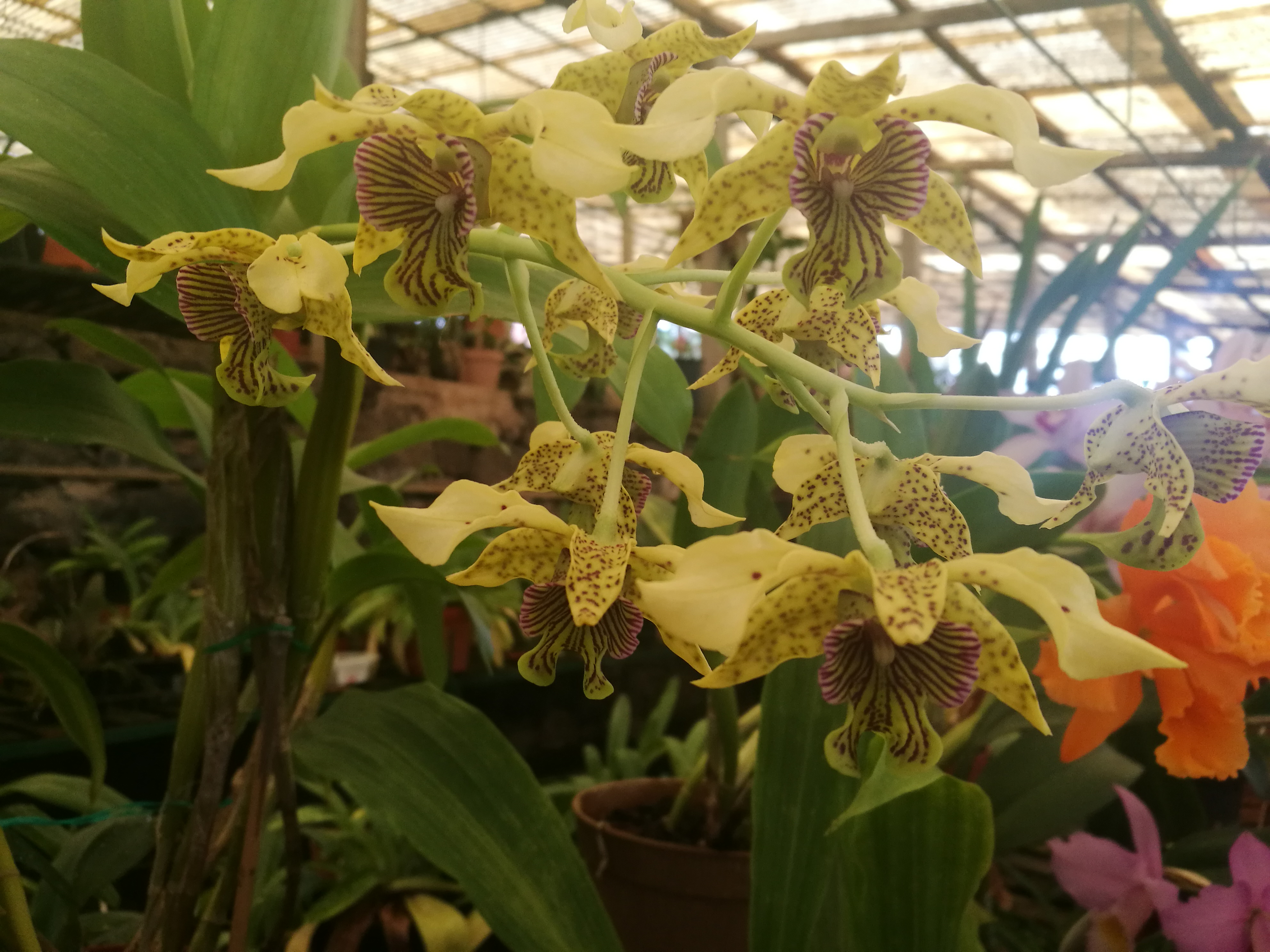
Dendrobium 'New Guinea' (Dendrobium atroviolaceum x macrophyllum)

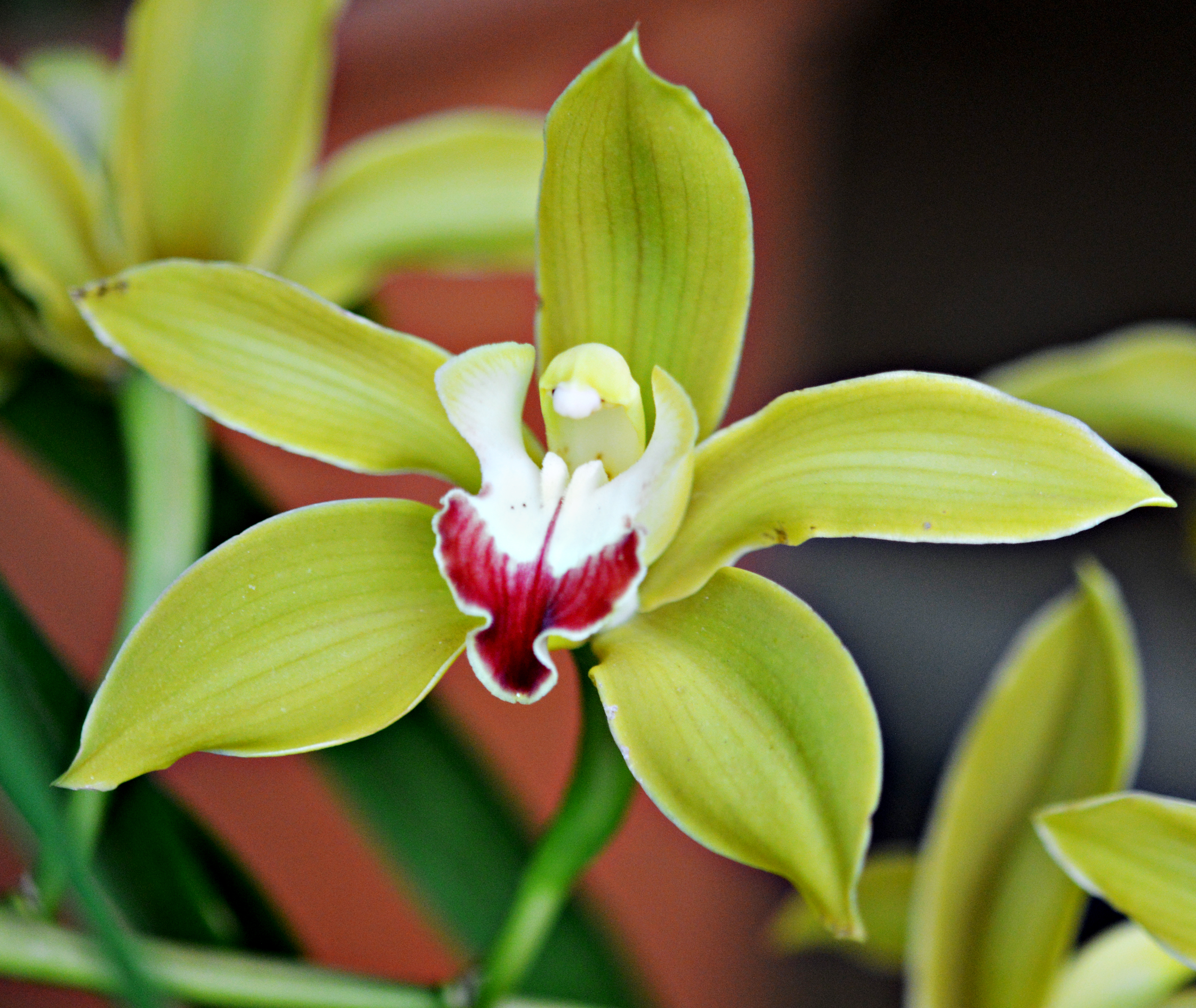
Green dendrobium

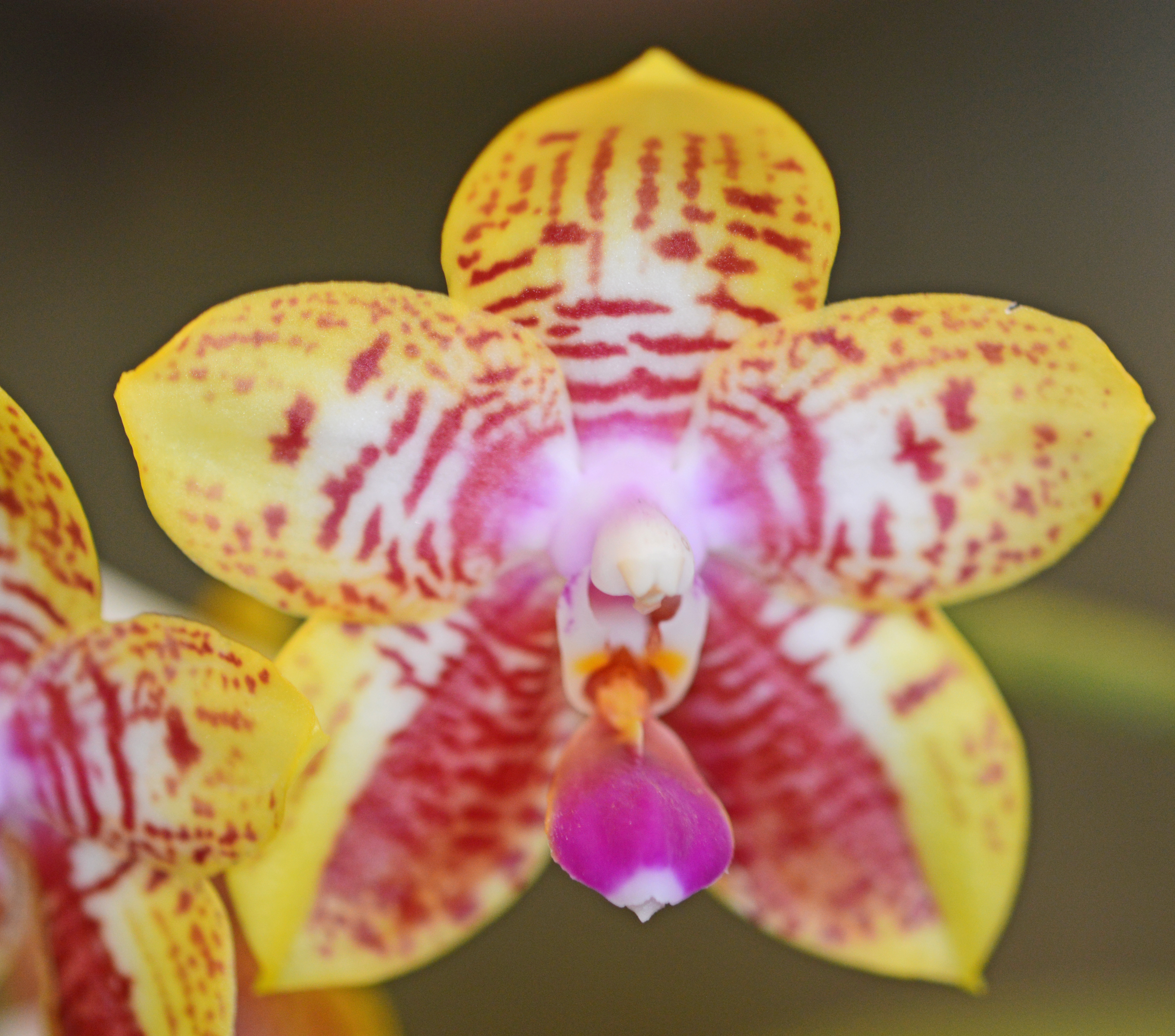
Orchid

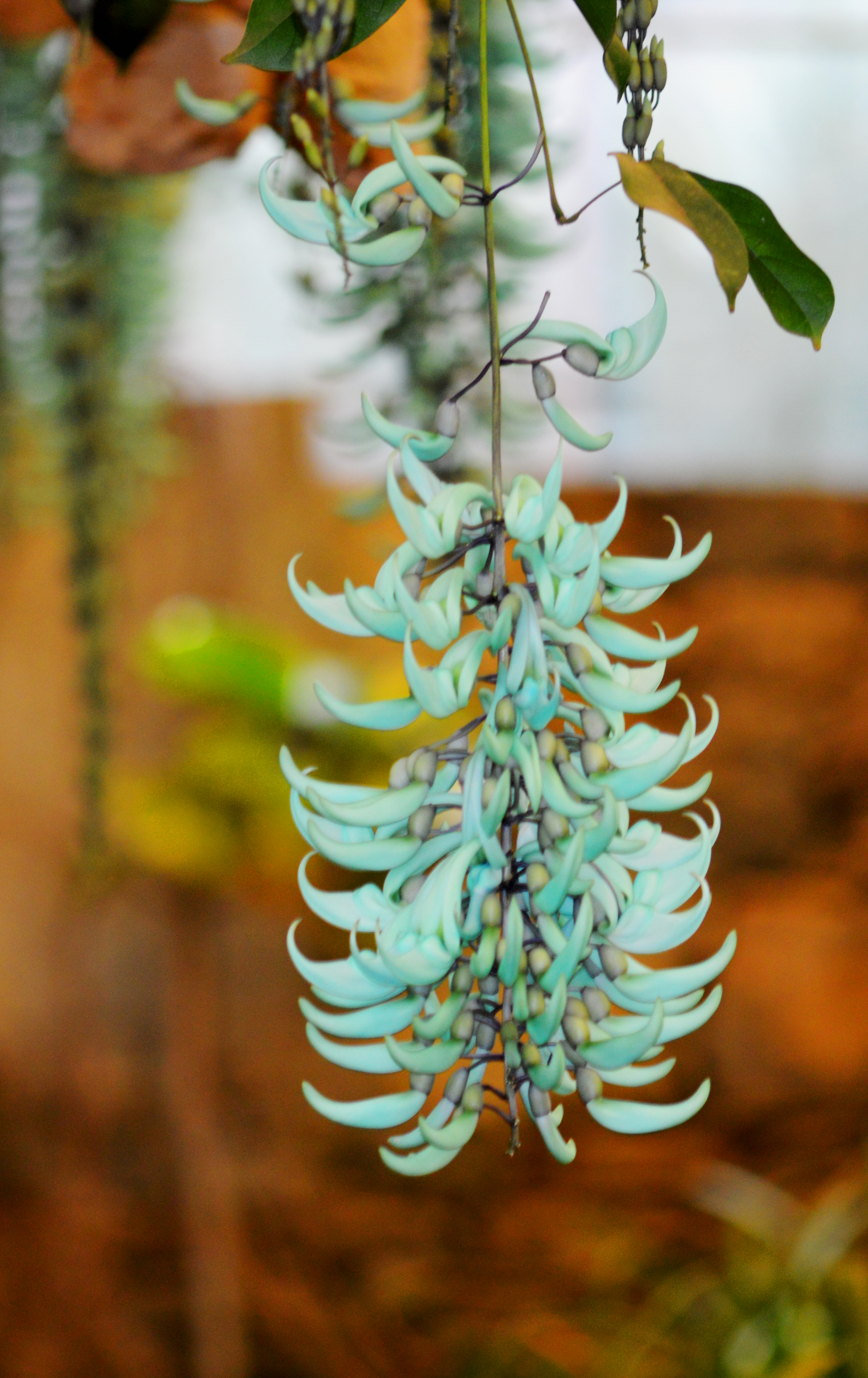
Jade vine

== 2016 Fires ==
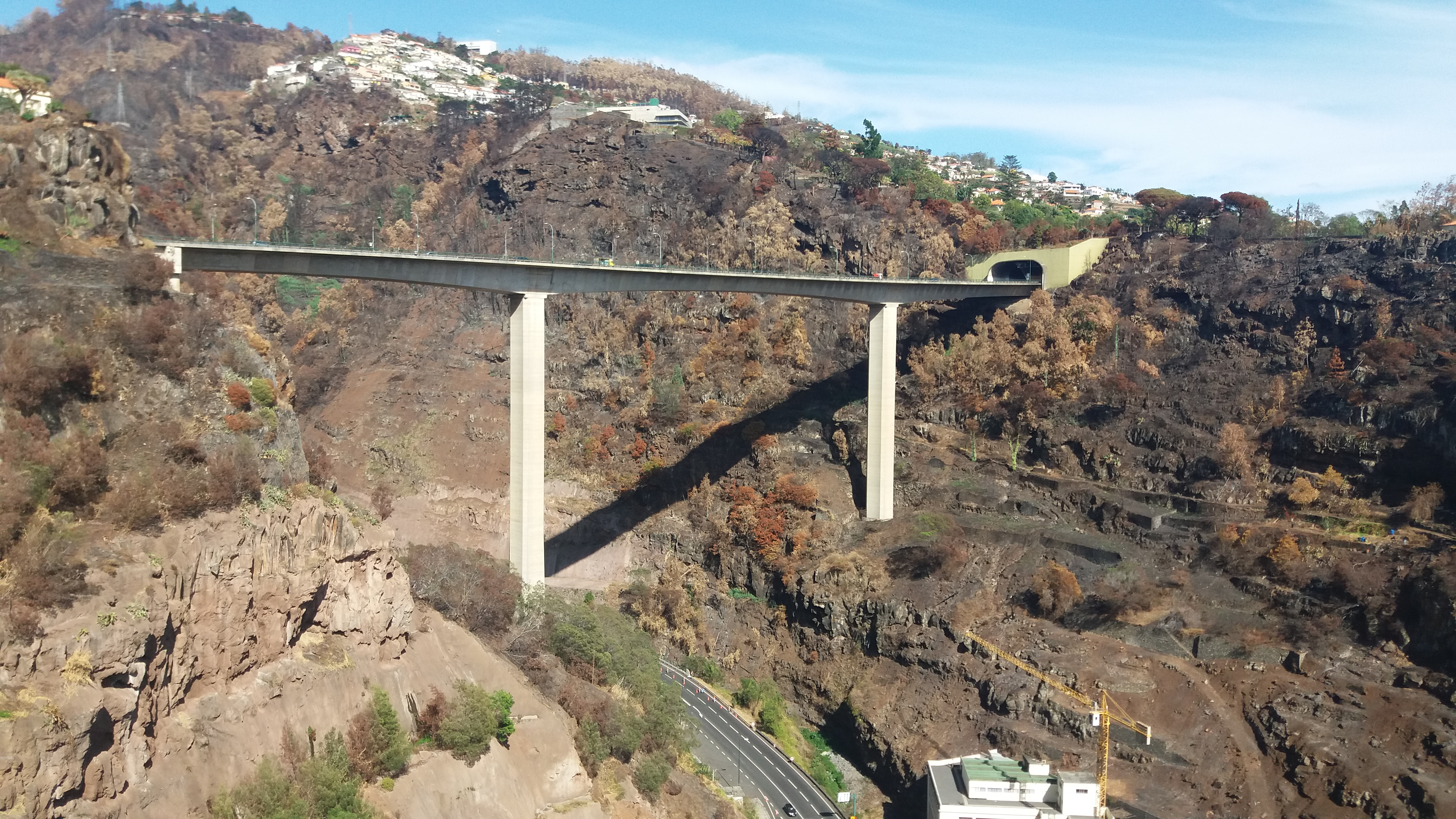
Aftermath of the fire on the slopes above the quinta, near the Botanical Garden

The Quinta da Boa Vista survived the 2016 Portugal wildfires unscathed; other orchid gardens, such as the Jardim Orquídea were almost completely destroyed.
