= Fort of São Tiago =

Fortress in Funchal, Madeira

Fortaleza de São Tiago
- Portuguese: Fortaleza de São Tiago
- Santa Maria Maior (Funchal), Madeira
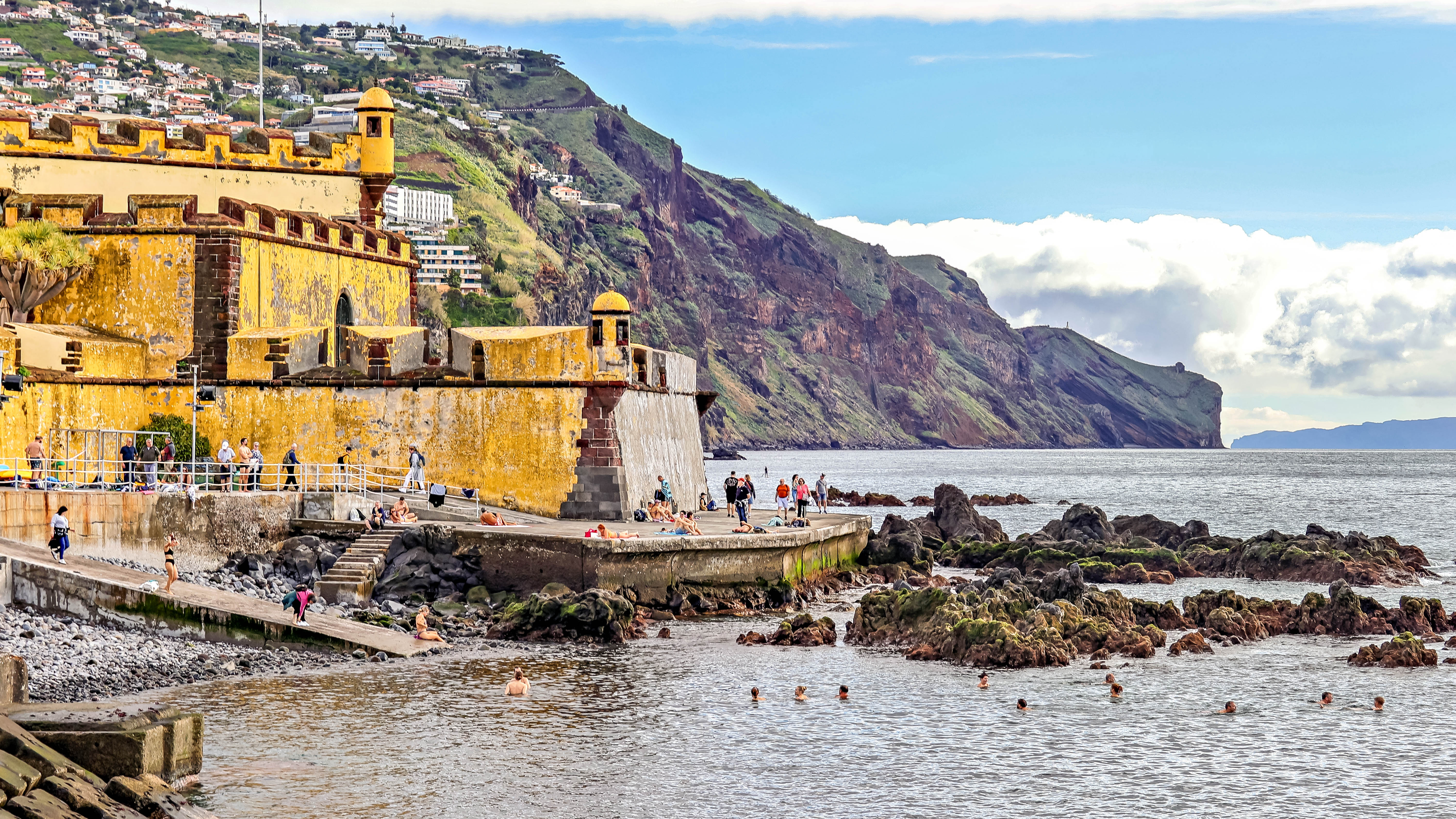

Site information
- Controlled by: Portugal (1512-1961)
- Open to the public: Yes

Location
- Location within Madeira
- Coordinates: 32°38′48.0″N 16°53′54.9″W

Site history
- Built: 1614
- Materials: Brick and Stone fort

The Fort of São Tiago (Portuguese: Fortaleza de São Tiago) is a historic military fort located in the historical centre (Zona Velha) of Funchal, Madeira. Constructed in the early 17th century, the fort was built to protect the island against pirate attacks and foreign invasions. The fort is notable for its prominent yellow walls, which contrast with the surrounding architecture, and its strategic position overlooking the Atlantic Ocean. Today, Fort of São Tiago serves as both a cultural landmark and a popular tourist attraction, offering panoramic views of the sea and the city of Funchal.

== History ==
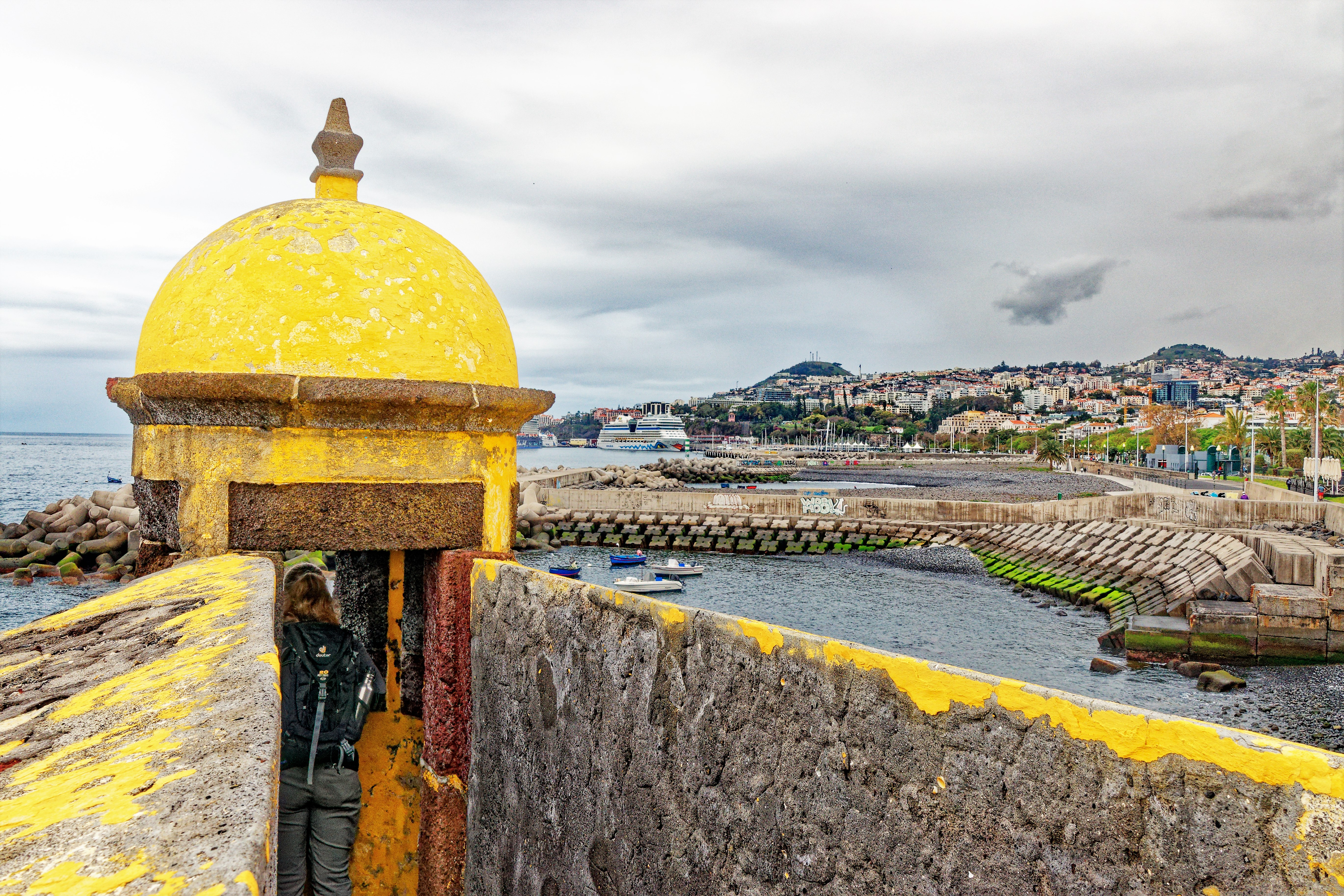
The fort and the port.

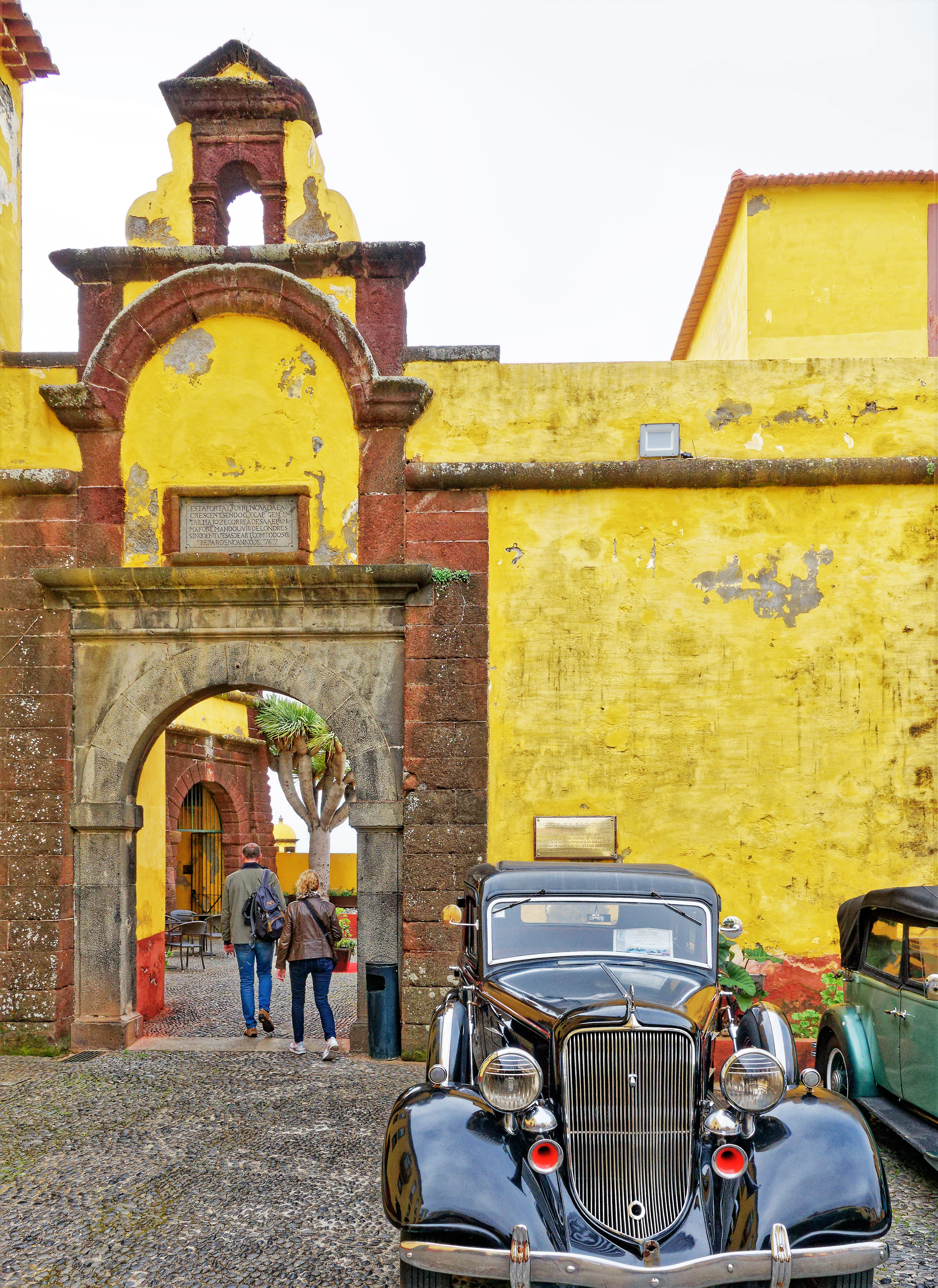
Entrance to the fort.

Fort of São Tiago was constructed in 1614 during a period when Madeira held significant strategic importance in the Atlantic Ocean. The fort was commissioned by the Portuguese Crown to defend the island from pirate raids, as well as attacks from other European powers. Throughout the 17th and 18th centuries, it played a crucial role in protecting Funchal from corsairs and privateers, particularly during conflicts between Portugal and Spain.

The fort underwent extensive restoration in the 1990s, transforming it into a cultural venue. From 1994 until 2015, it housed the Madeira Museum of Contemporary Art (Museu de Arte Contemporânea da Madeira), which has since relocated to Calheta.

== Architecture ==
Fort of São Tiago is an example of 17th-century Portuguese military architecture. The structure is characterized by its robust stone walls and bastions, designed to withstand cannon fire and repel naval assaults. The most distinguishing feature of the fort is its vivid yellow exterior, a color scheme that was applied during its restoration in the late 20th century. This striking appearance sets it apart from the surrounding buildings in Funchal's historic district.

The fort's design includes multiple watchtowers and ramparts that once provided soldiers with clear views of the harbor and surrounding coastline. Inside the fort, visitors can explore its courtyards, battlements, and a small chapel that once served the religious needs of stationed soldiers. The strategic coastal location of Fort of São Tiago allowed early detection of approaching ships, ensuring its critical role in the island’s defense system.

== Visitor Information ==
Opening Hours:

Fort of São Tiago is accessible to the public at any time, as the grounds are open without restrictions. Visitors can freely explore the exterior and enjoy views from the fort’s walls.

Admission:

Entrance to the fort is free of charge.

Location:

Fort of São Tiago is located in Funchal’s old town, at Tv. do Forte 8, 9060-123 Funchal

== A walk through the fort ==
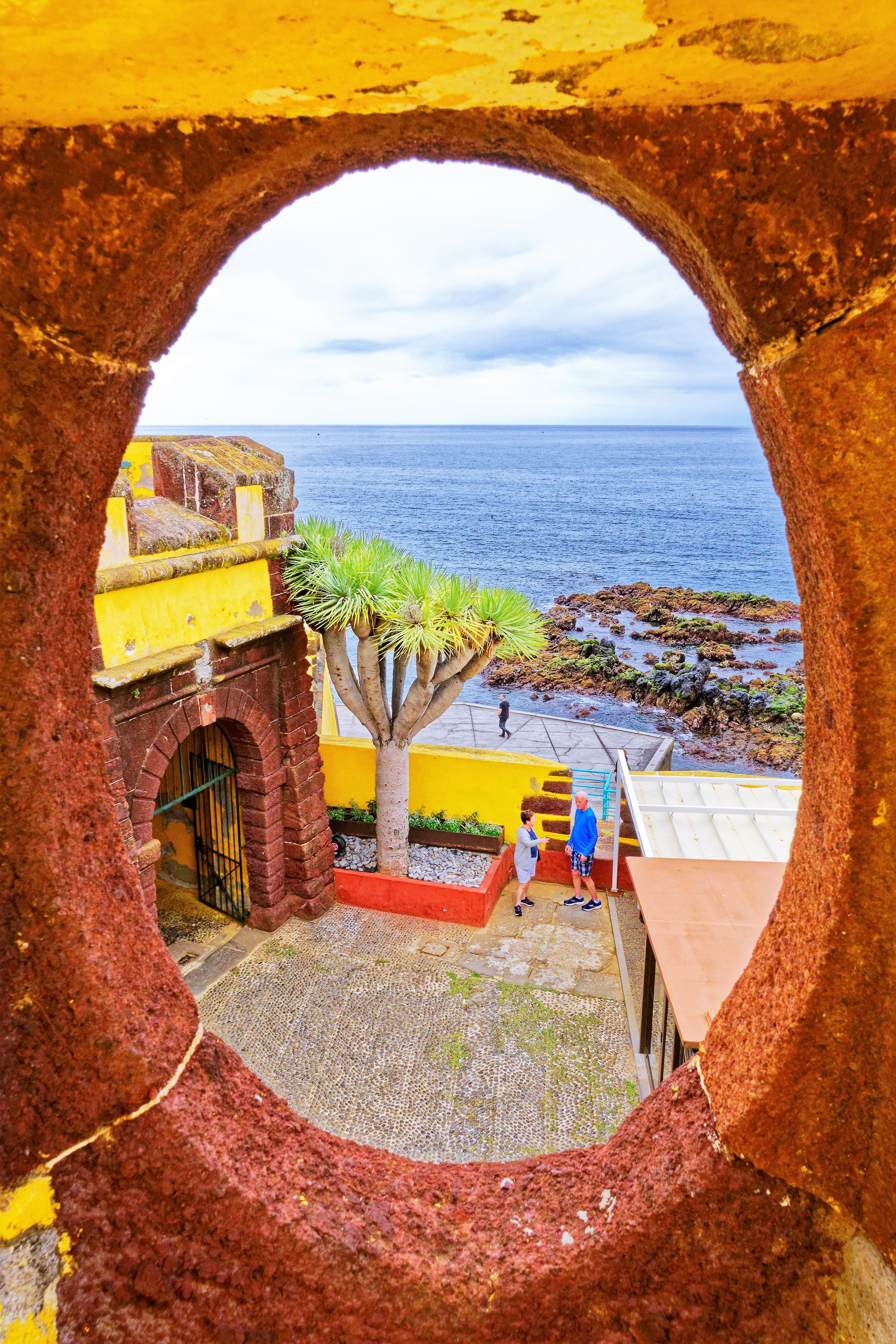

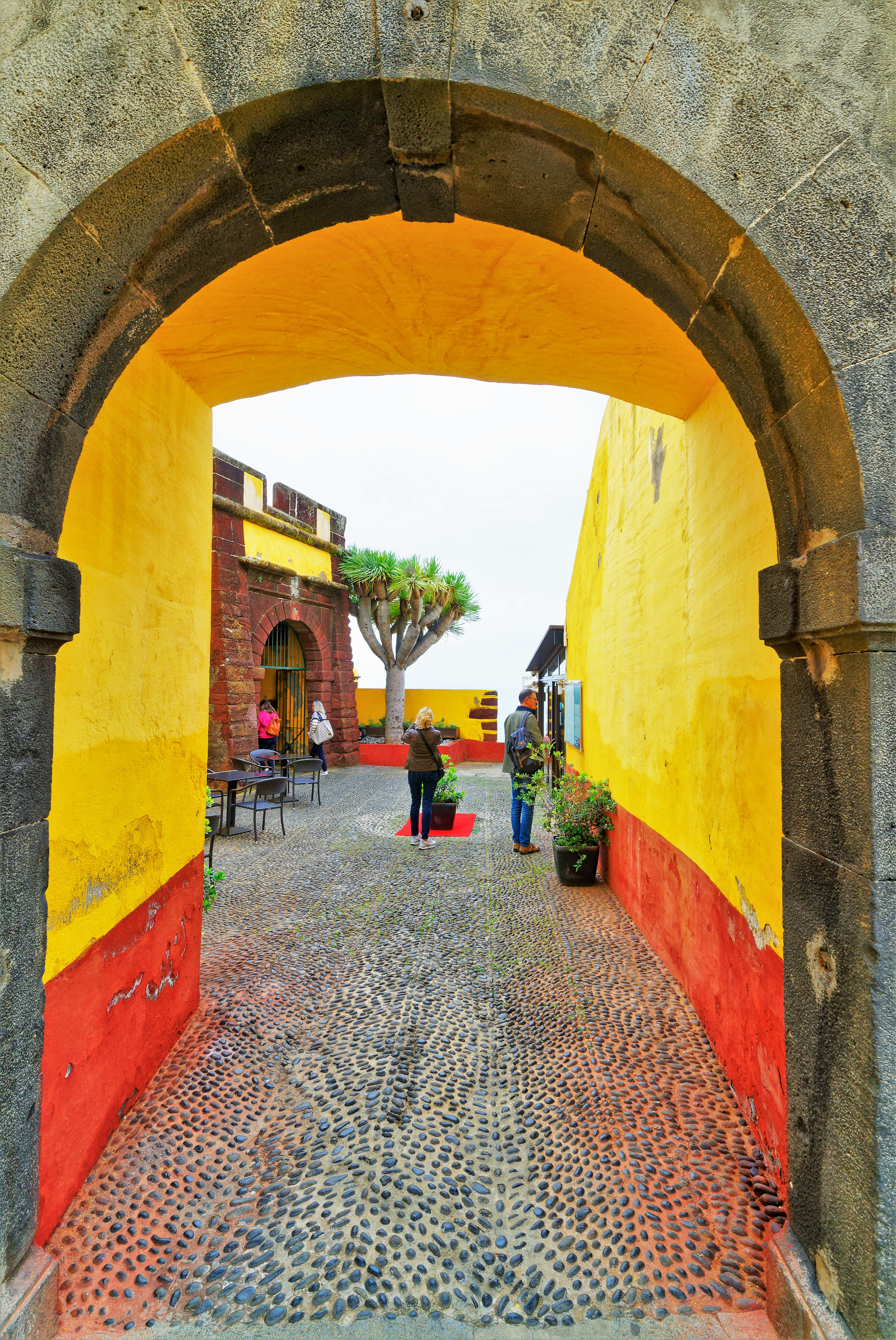

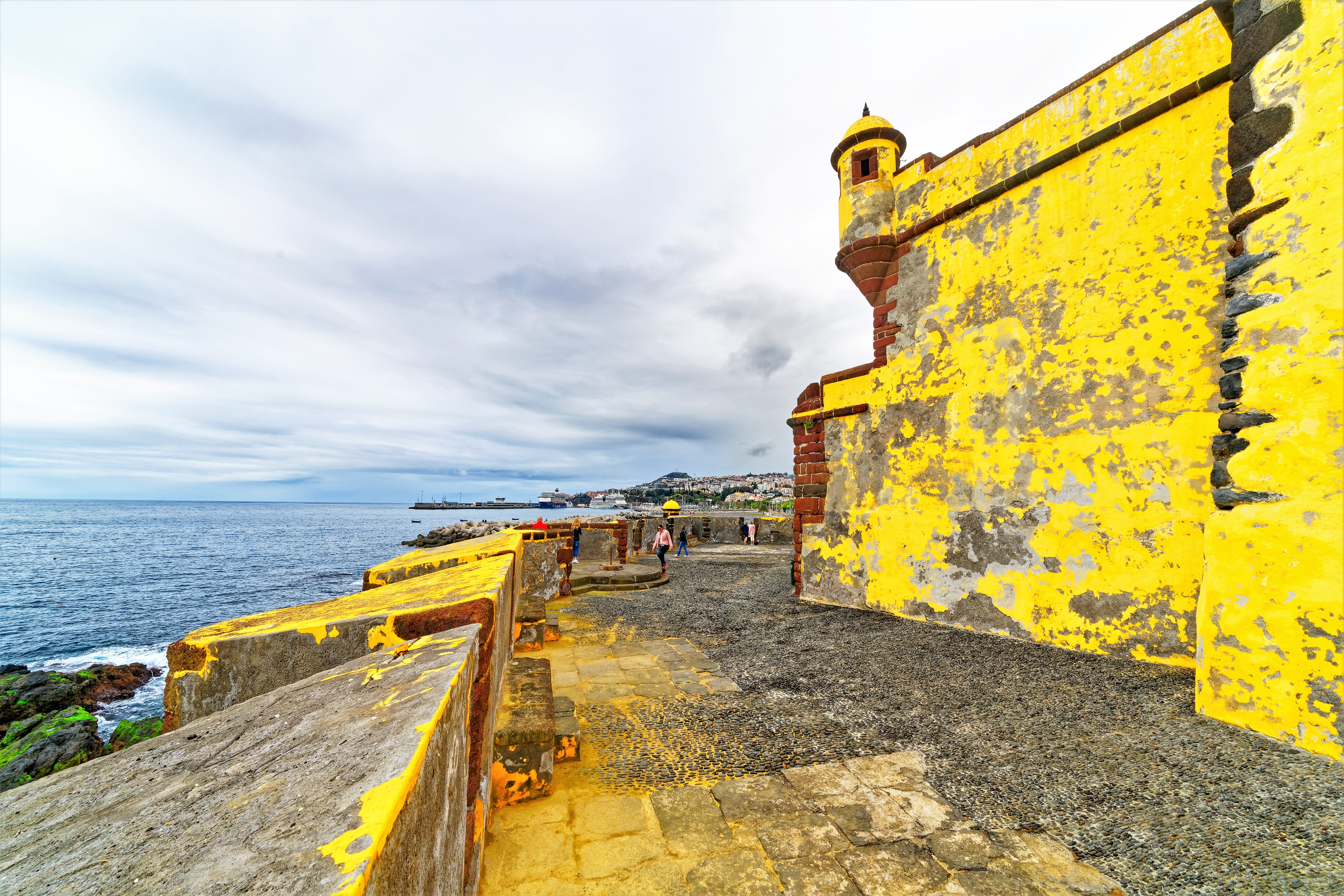

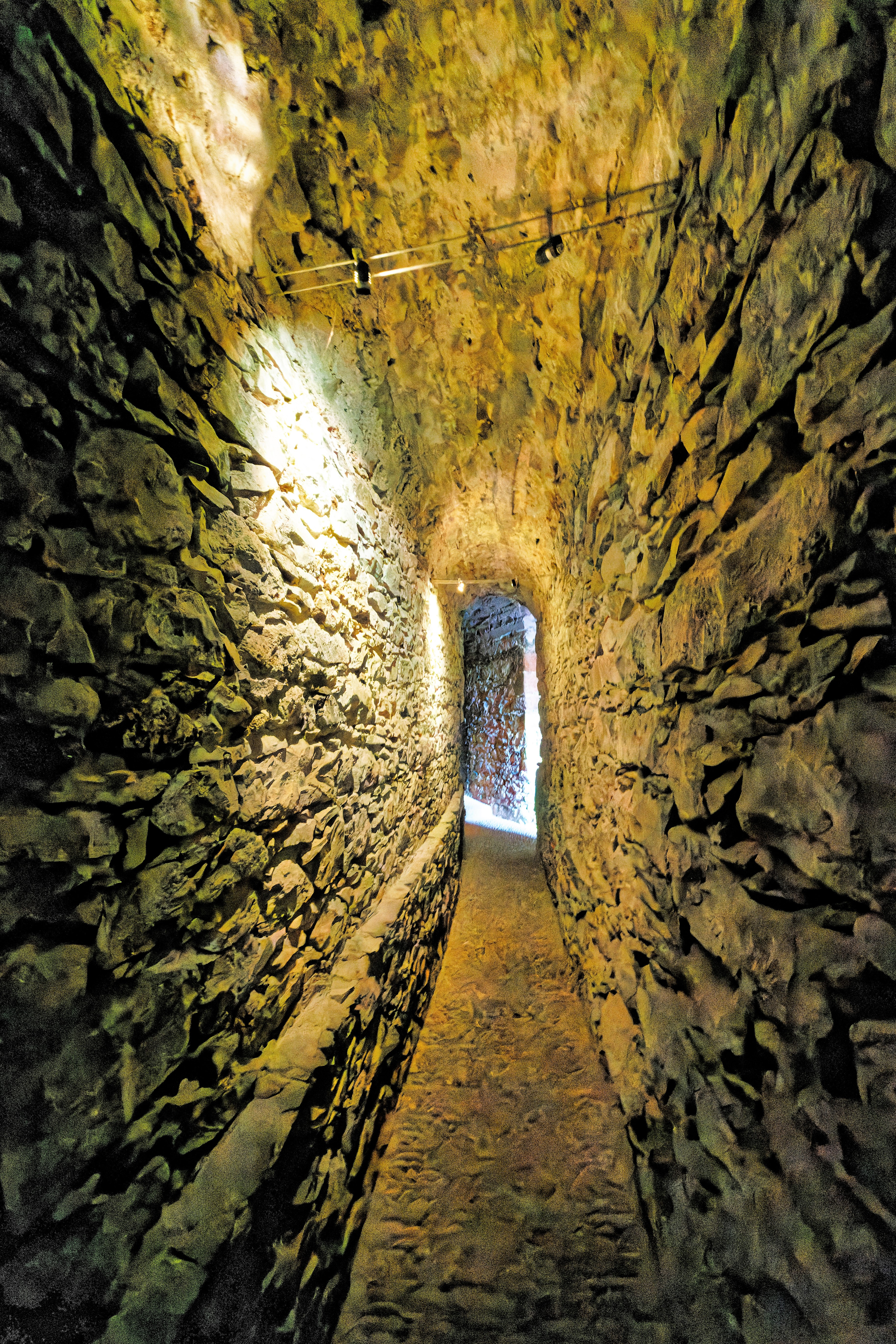

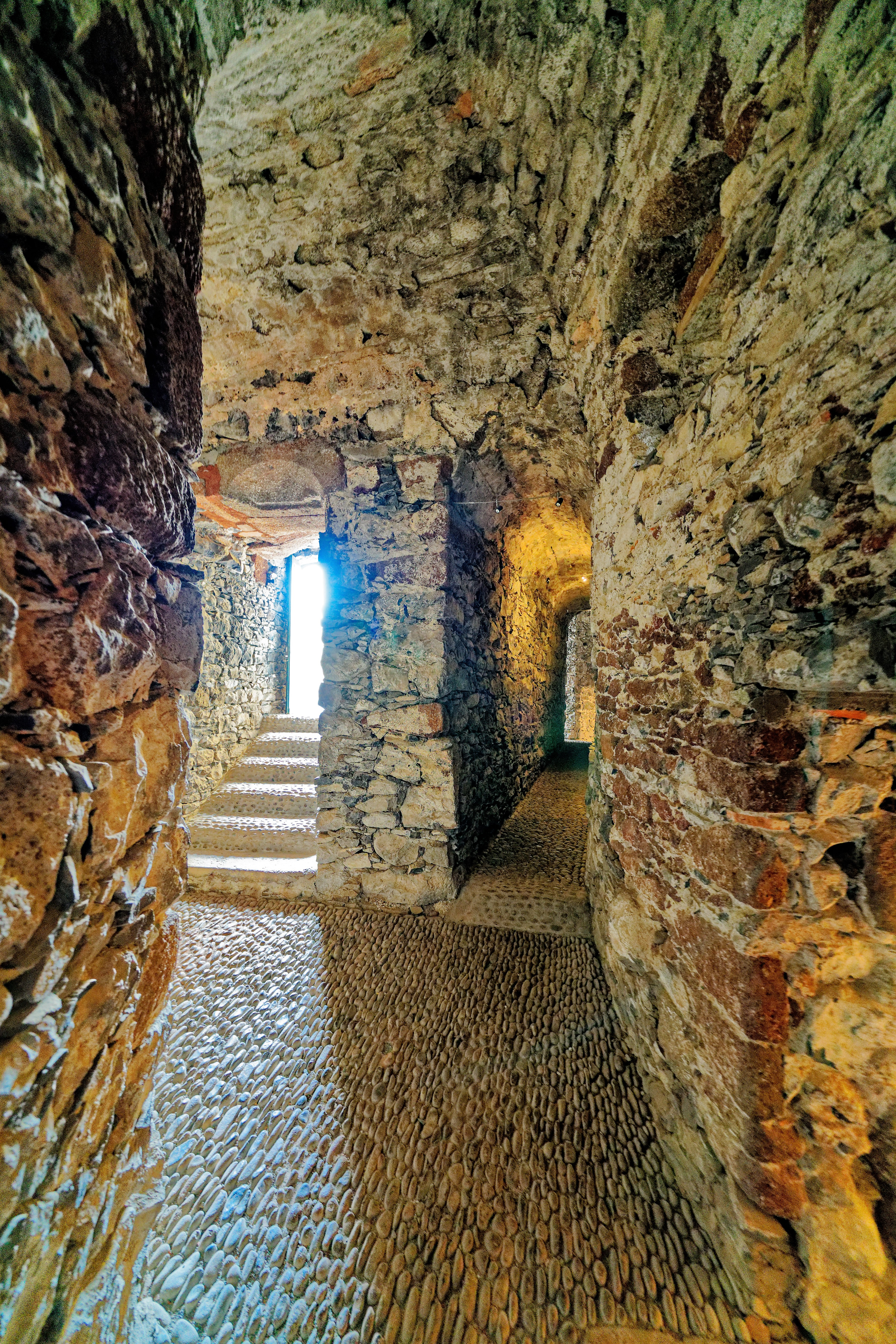

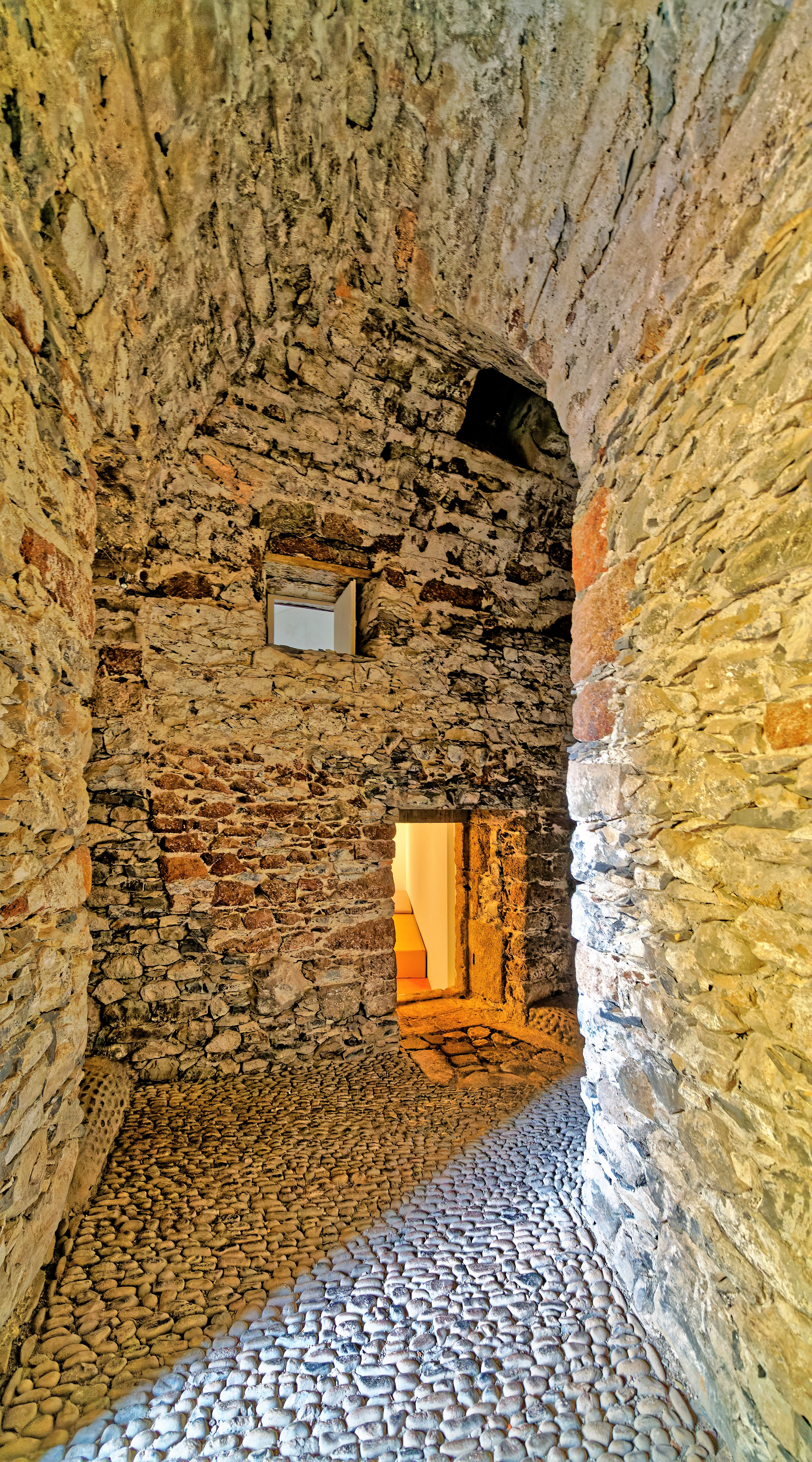

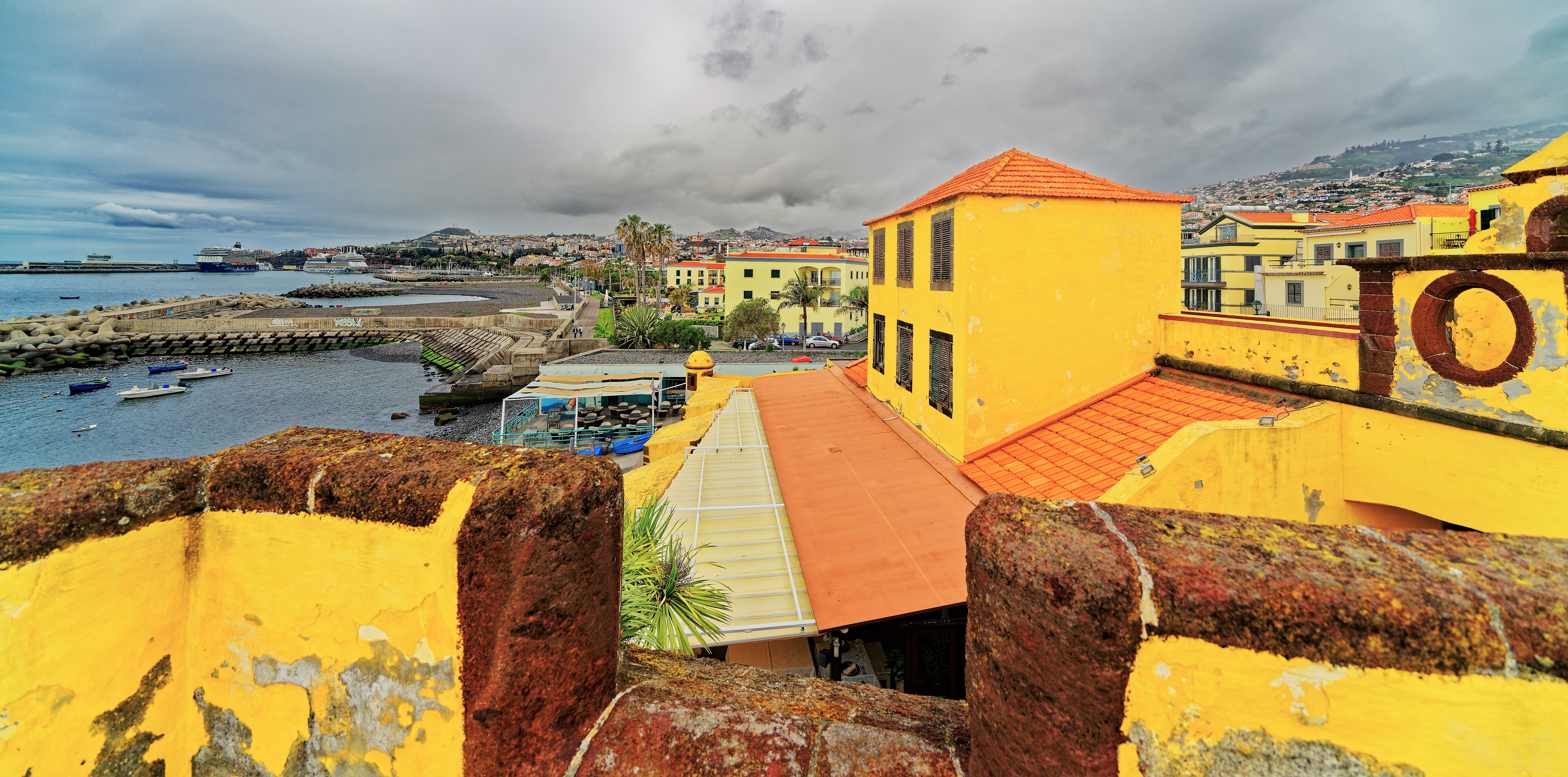

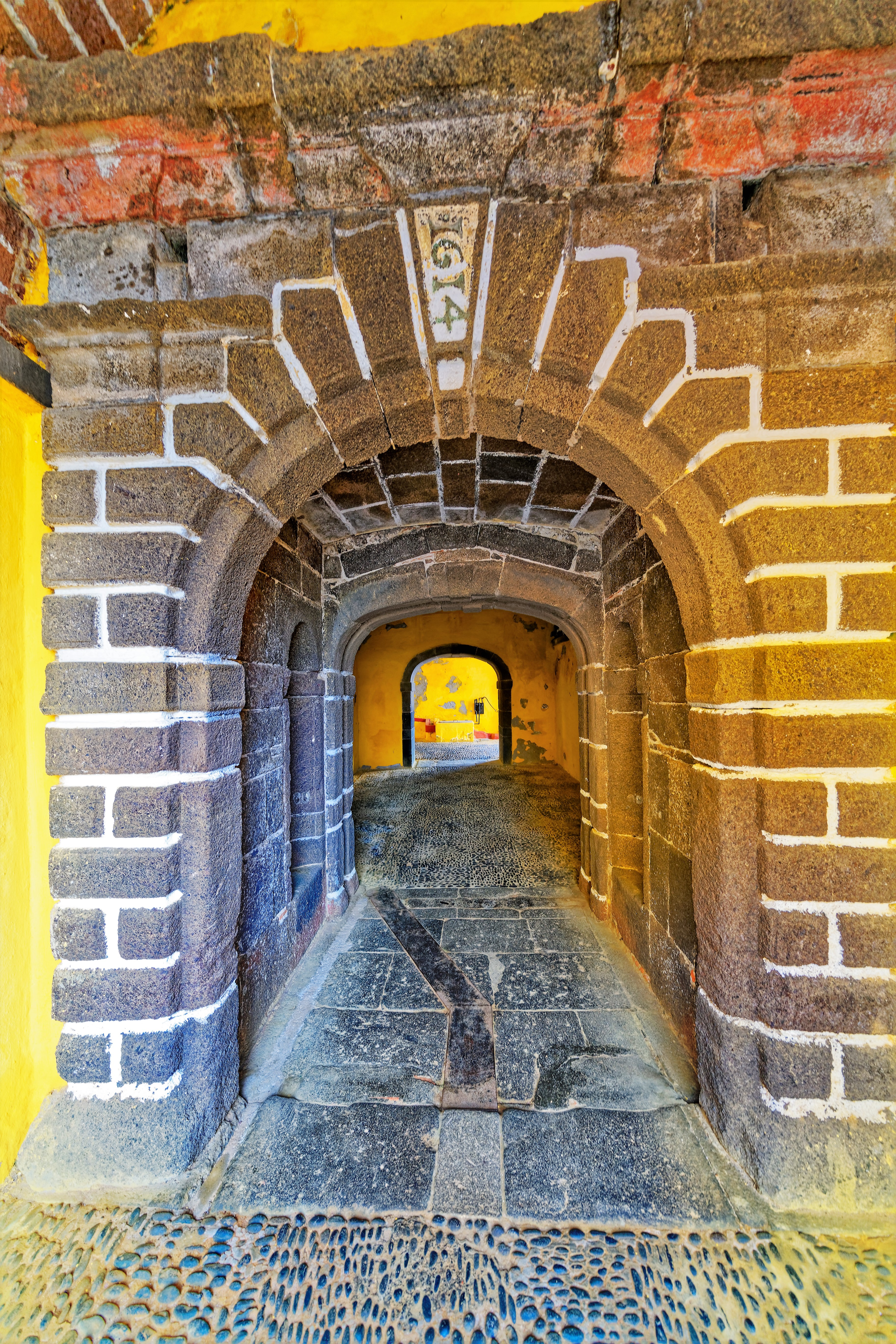
