= Mercado dos Lavradores =

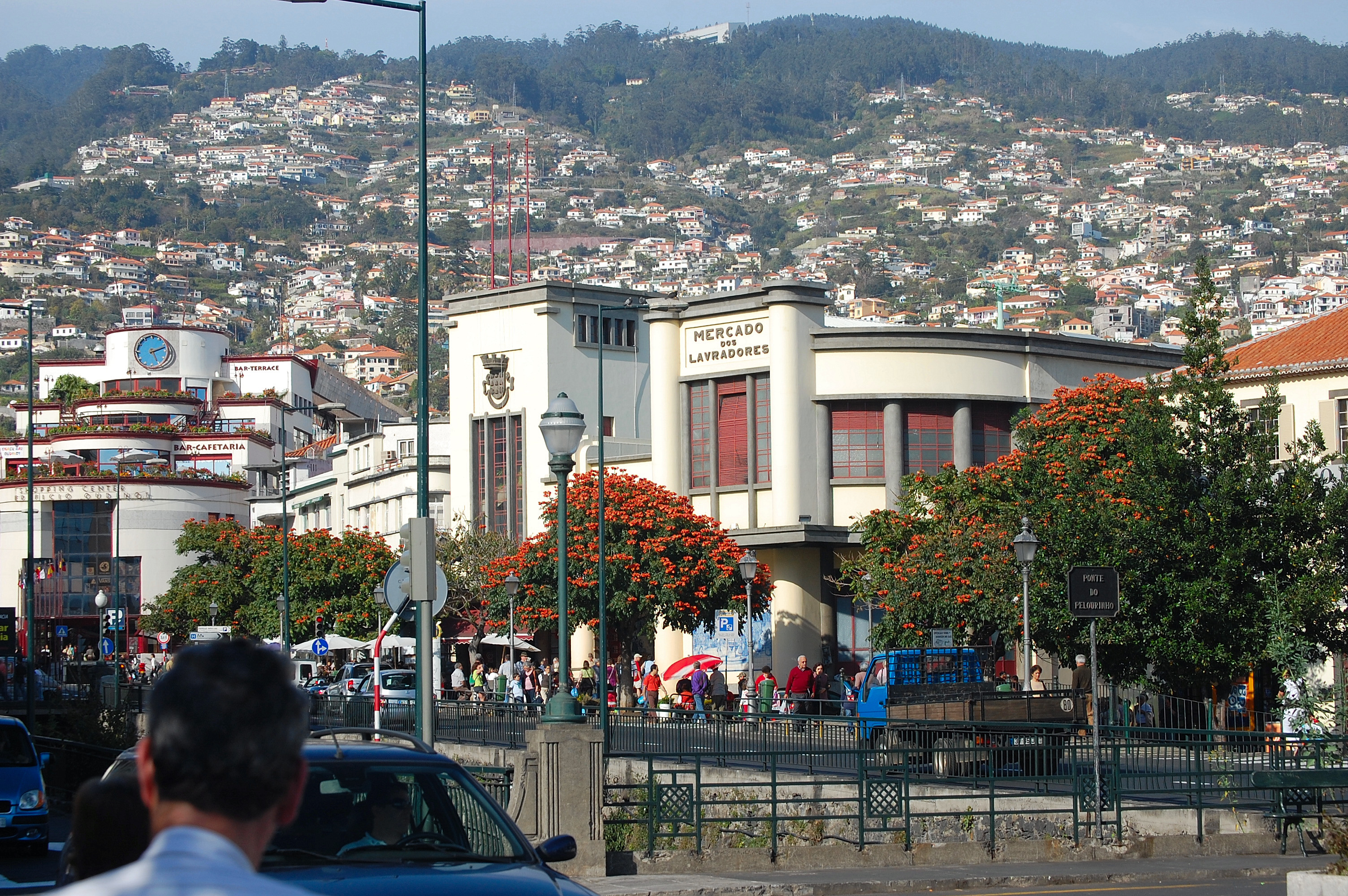
- Interactive map of the Mercado dos Lavradores area

General information
- Location: Funchal, Madeira
- Coordinates: 32°38′55.1″N 16°54′14.0″W
- Completed: 25 November 1940
- Opening: 32°38'55.1"N 16°54'14.0"W

Height
- Architectural: Art Déco

Technical details
- Floor count: 3

Design and construction
- Architect: Edmundo Tavares

Website
- http://mercados.cm-funchal.pt/

The Mercado dos Lavradores (English: farmers' market) is a fruit, vegetable, flower and fish market in Funchal, Madeira. The building was designed by Edmundo Tavares and opened on 24 November 1940. The facade, main entrance and fish market contain traditional Azulejo (panels of tiles) depicting regional themes, executed by João Rodrigues. It is divided into a number of smaller squares and stairways that are used as sales venues.

On the night of 23 December (known locally as night of the market, Noite do Mercado in Portuguese), it is traditional for locals to meet in the market and surrounding streets singing Christmas songs, dance and drink in the nearby bars, which are open throughout the night to serve traditional drinks and especially the traditional Carne de vinha d'alhos sandwiches.

== Gallery ==
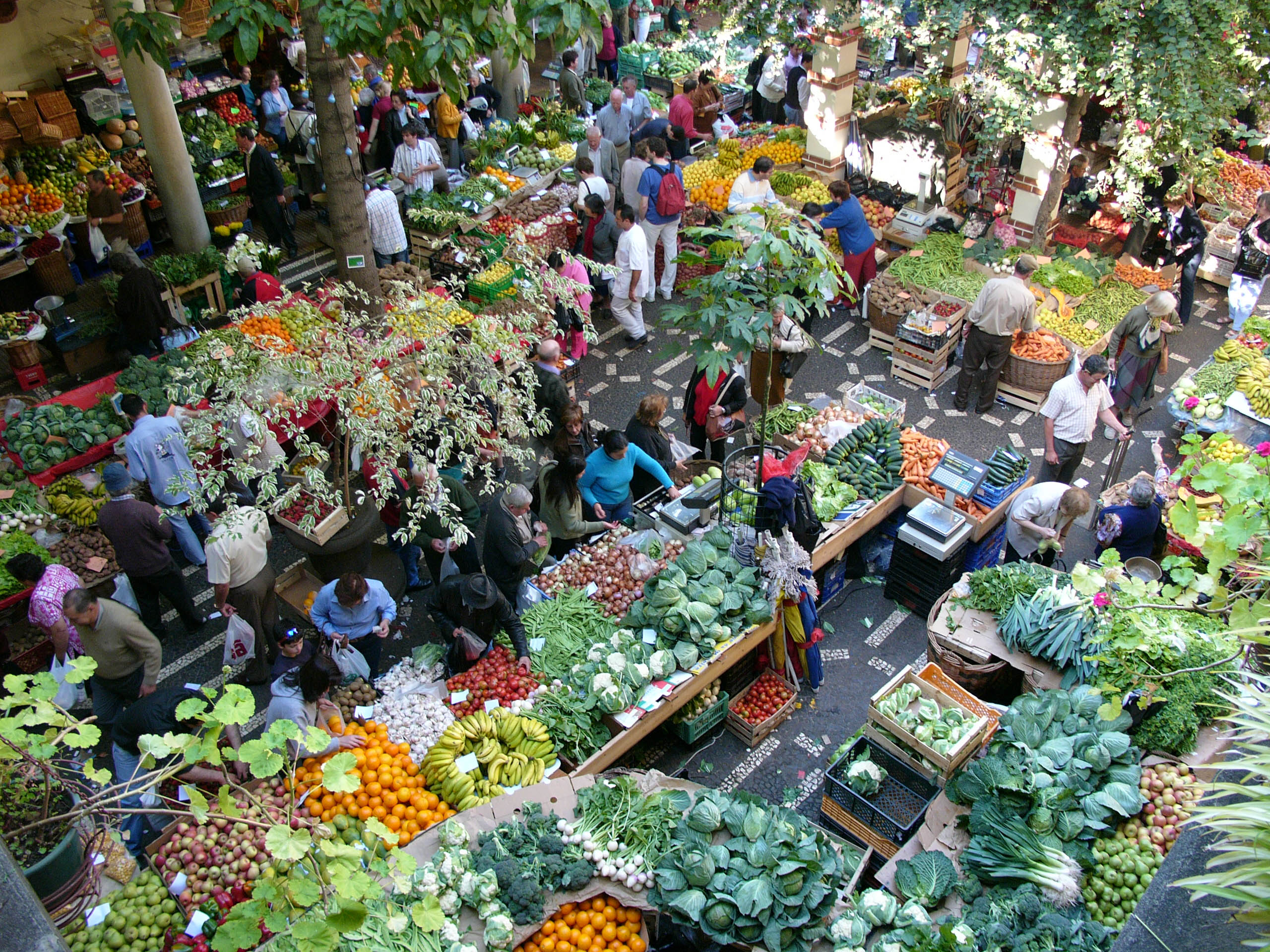
Fruit section of the market.

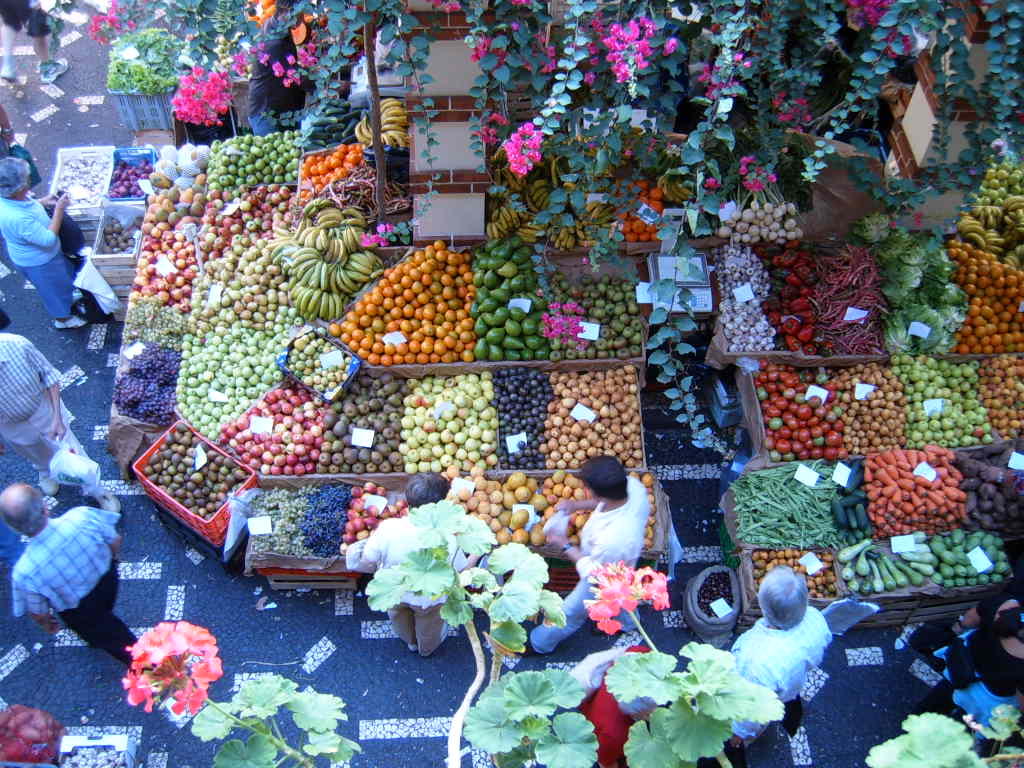
Fruit section of the market.

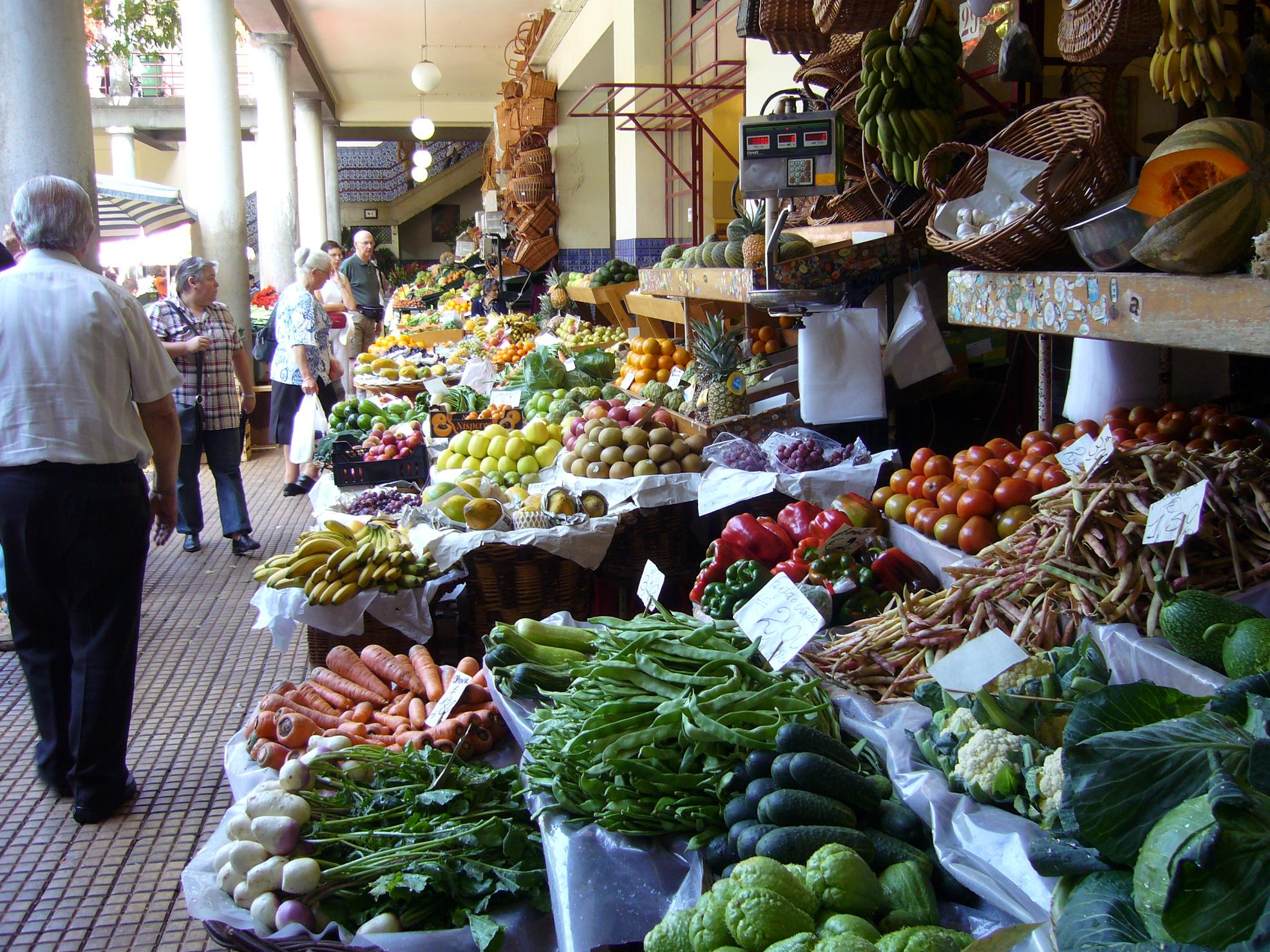
Fruit and other regional produce.

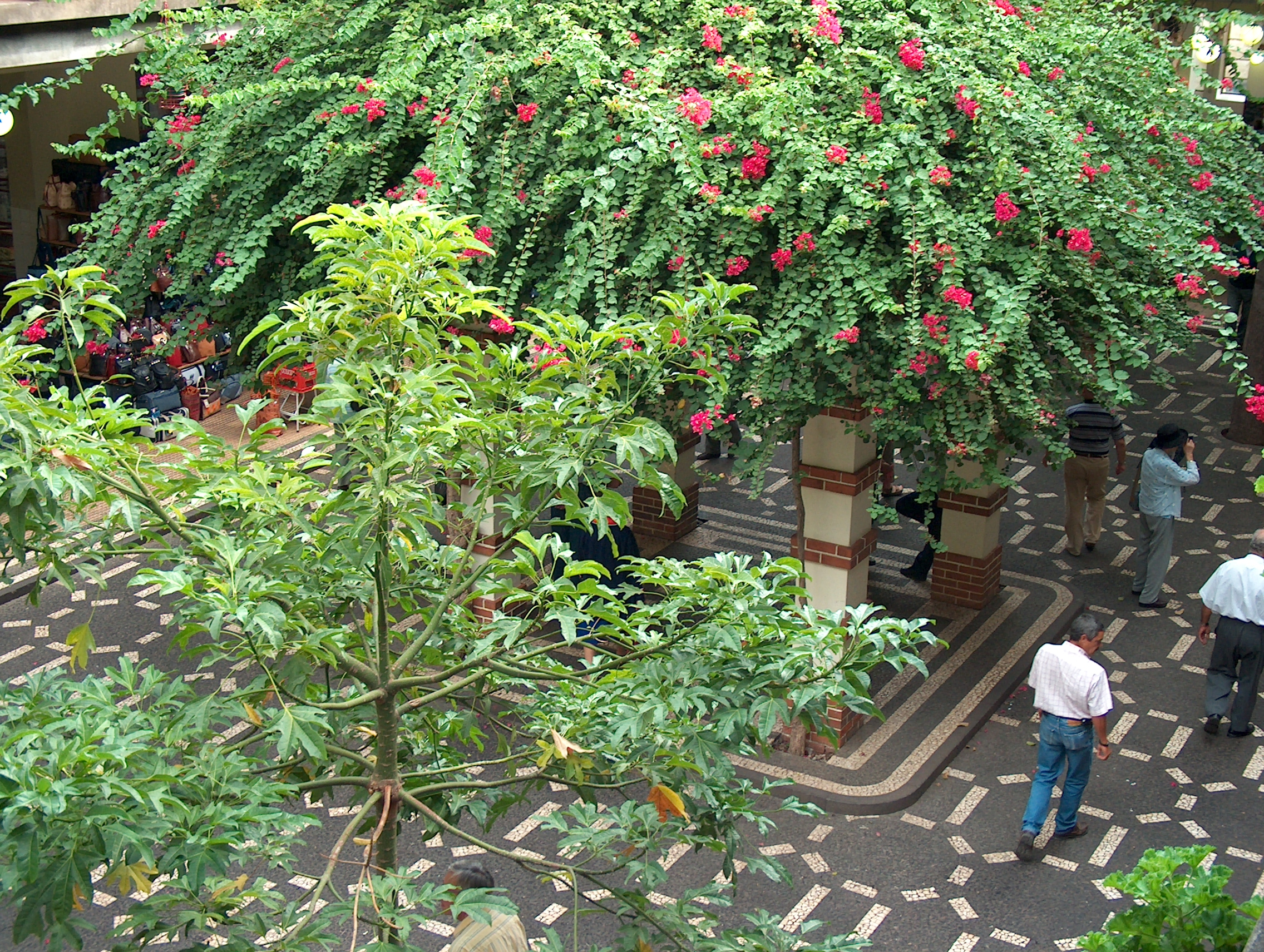
Interior.

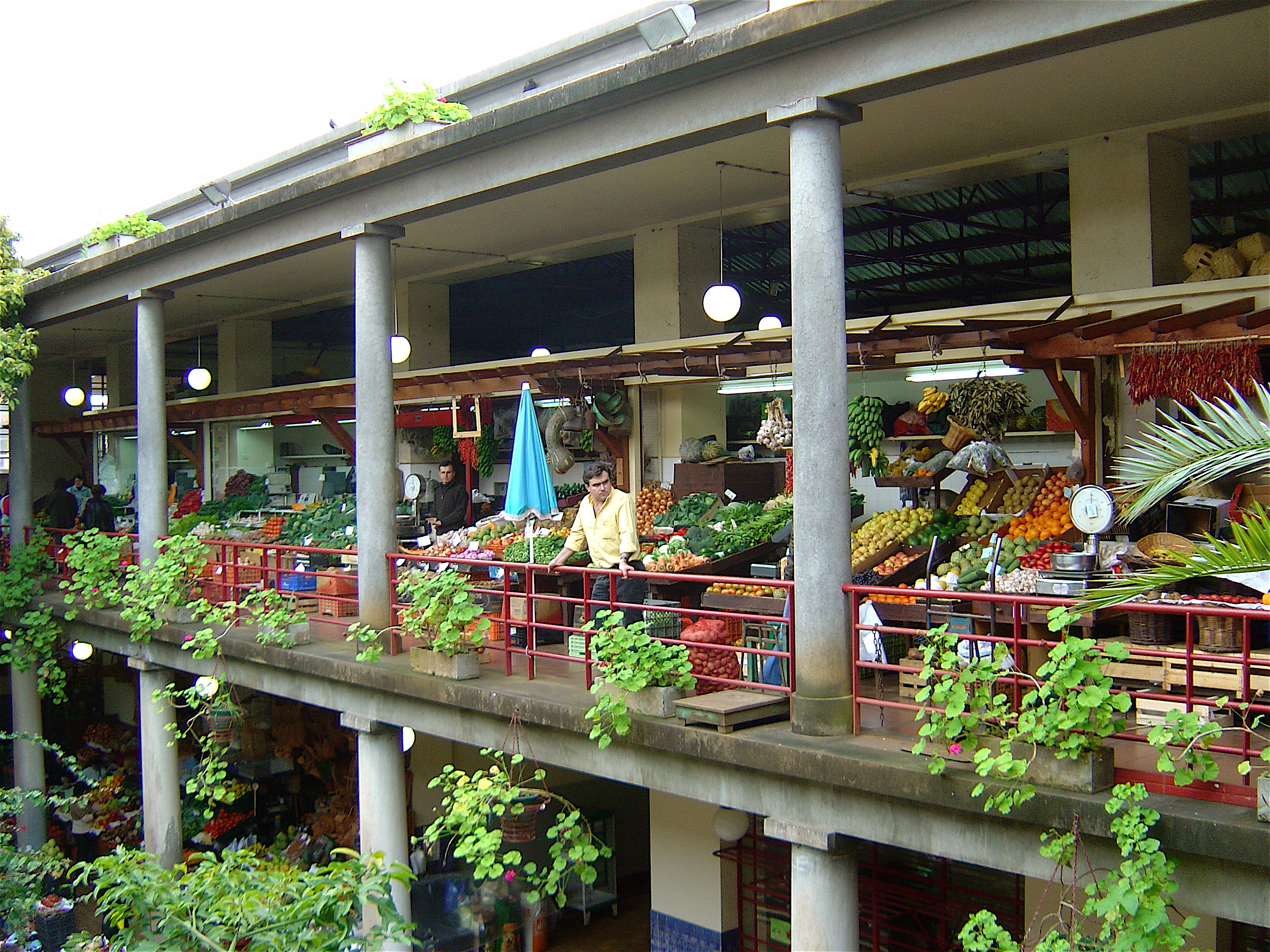
Upper floor of the market.

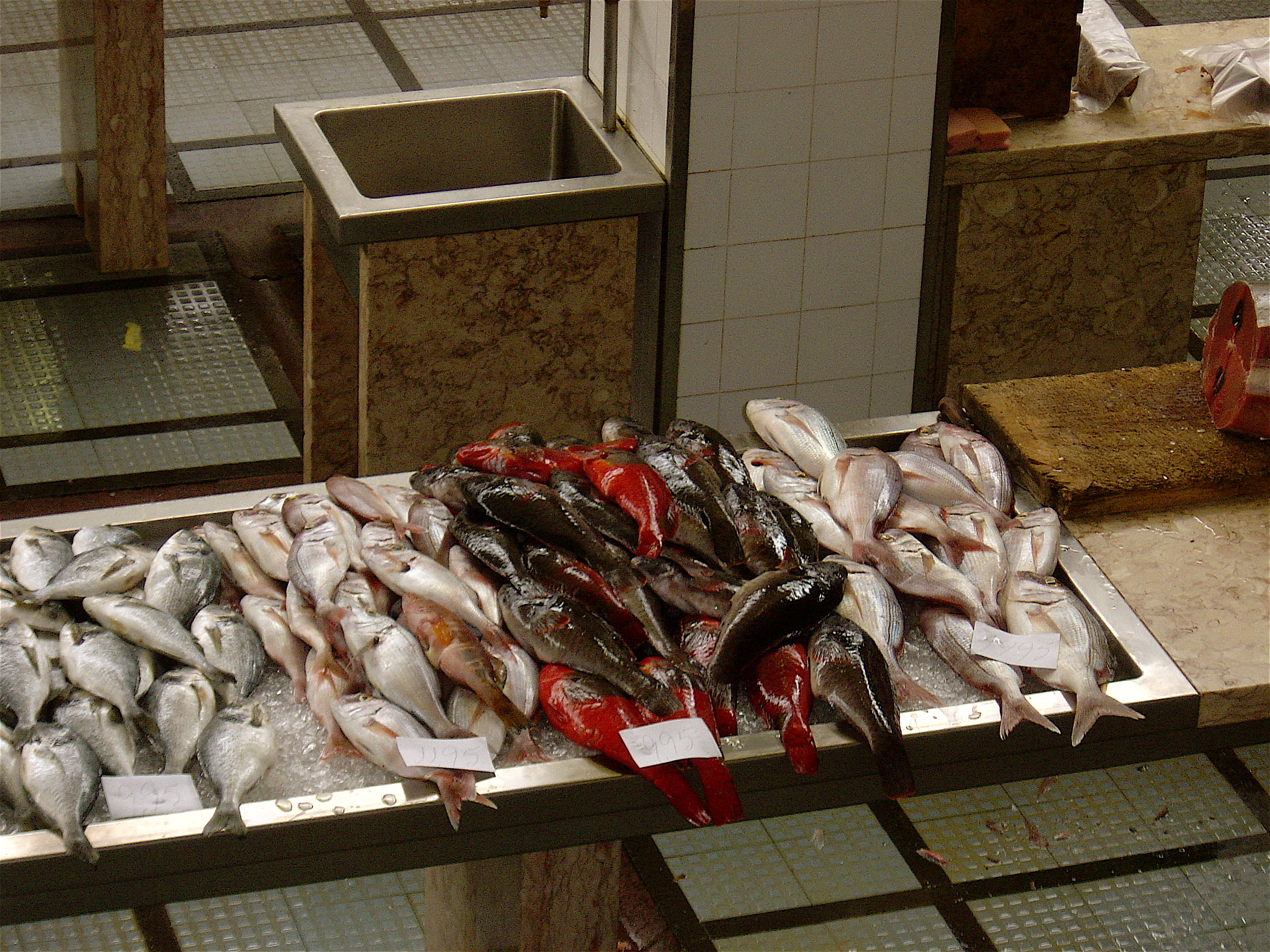
Fish section of the market.

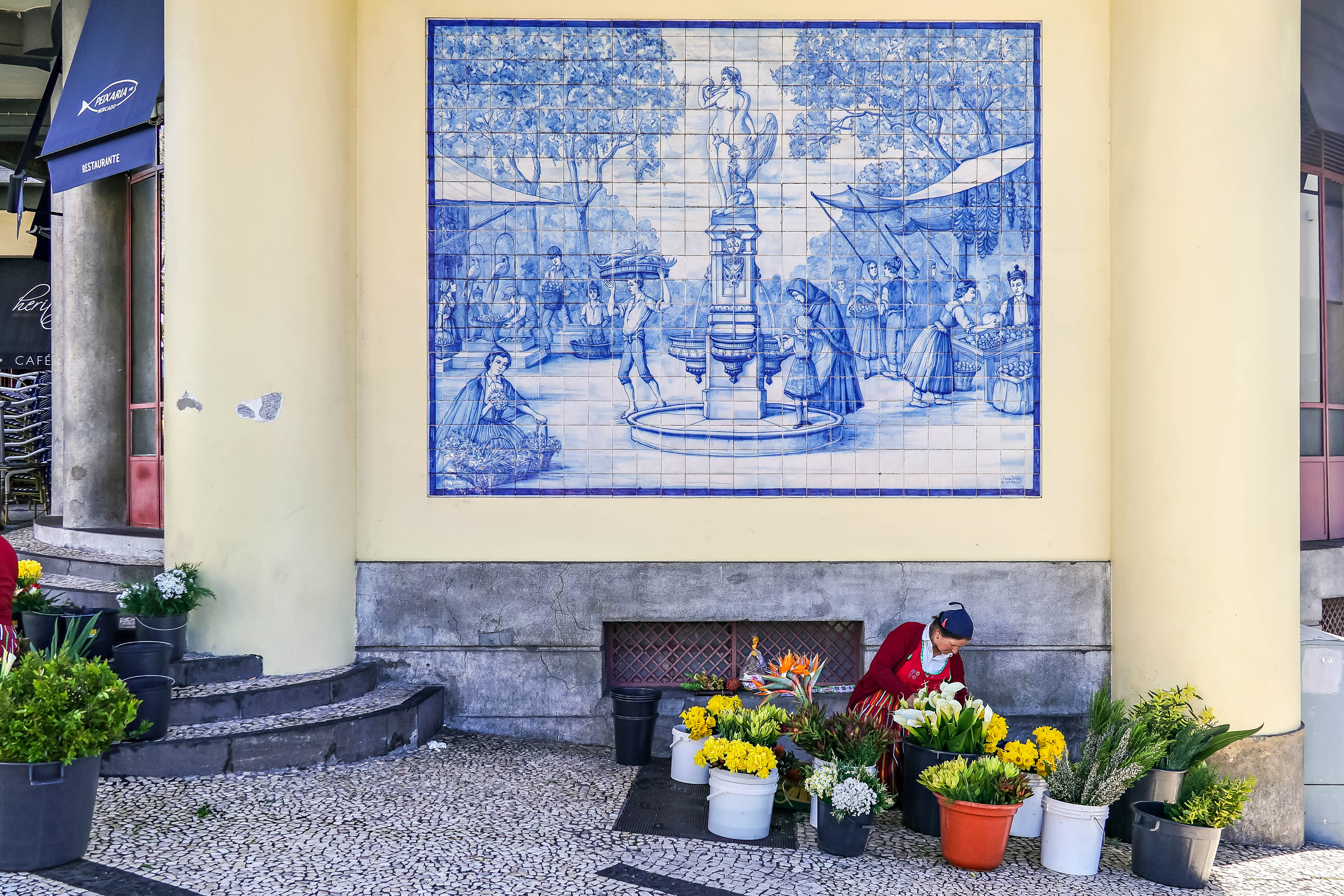
Azulejo entrance of the market.

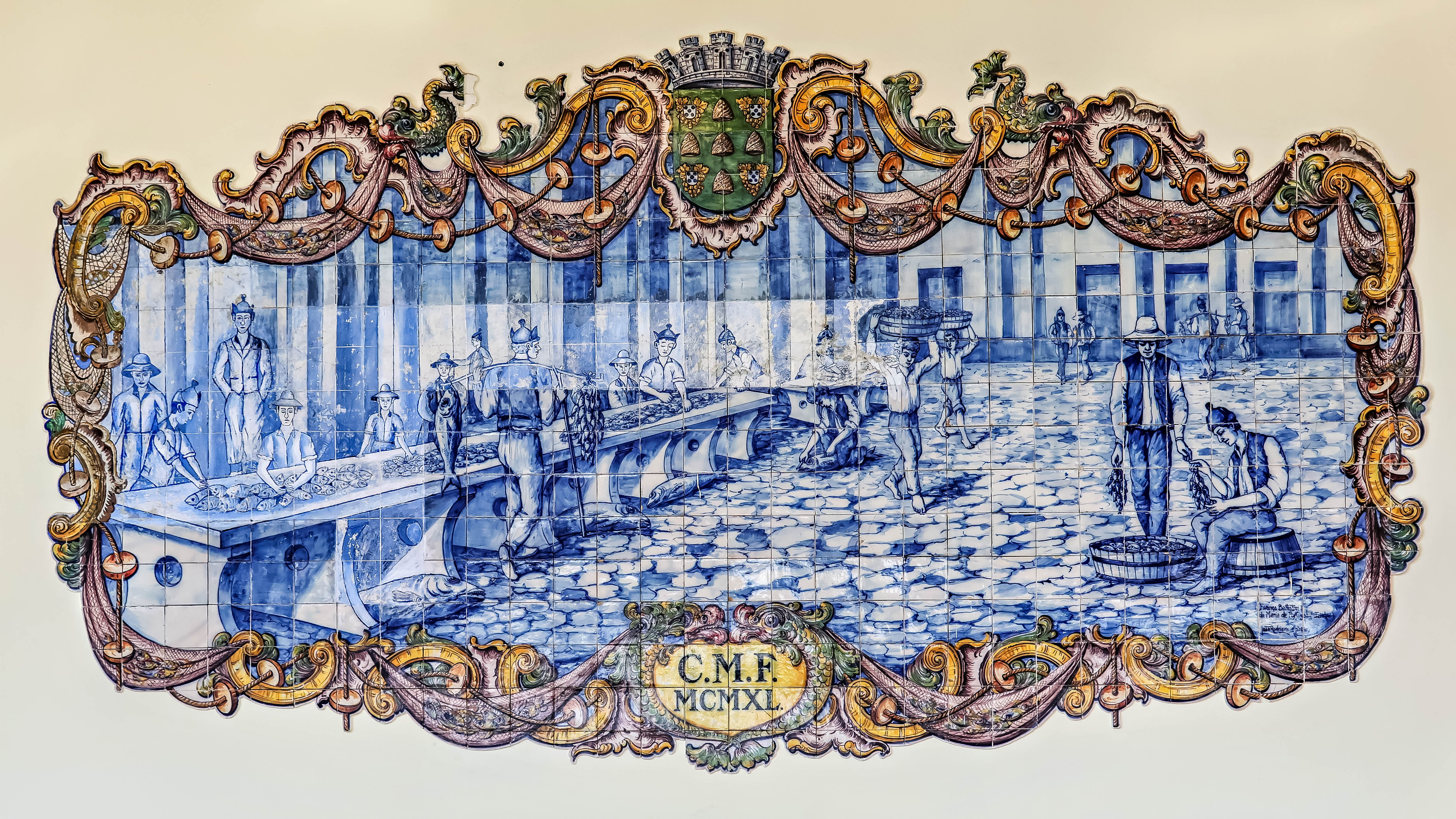
Azulejo in the market.

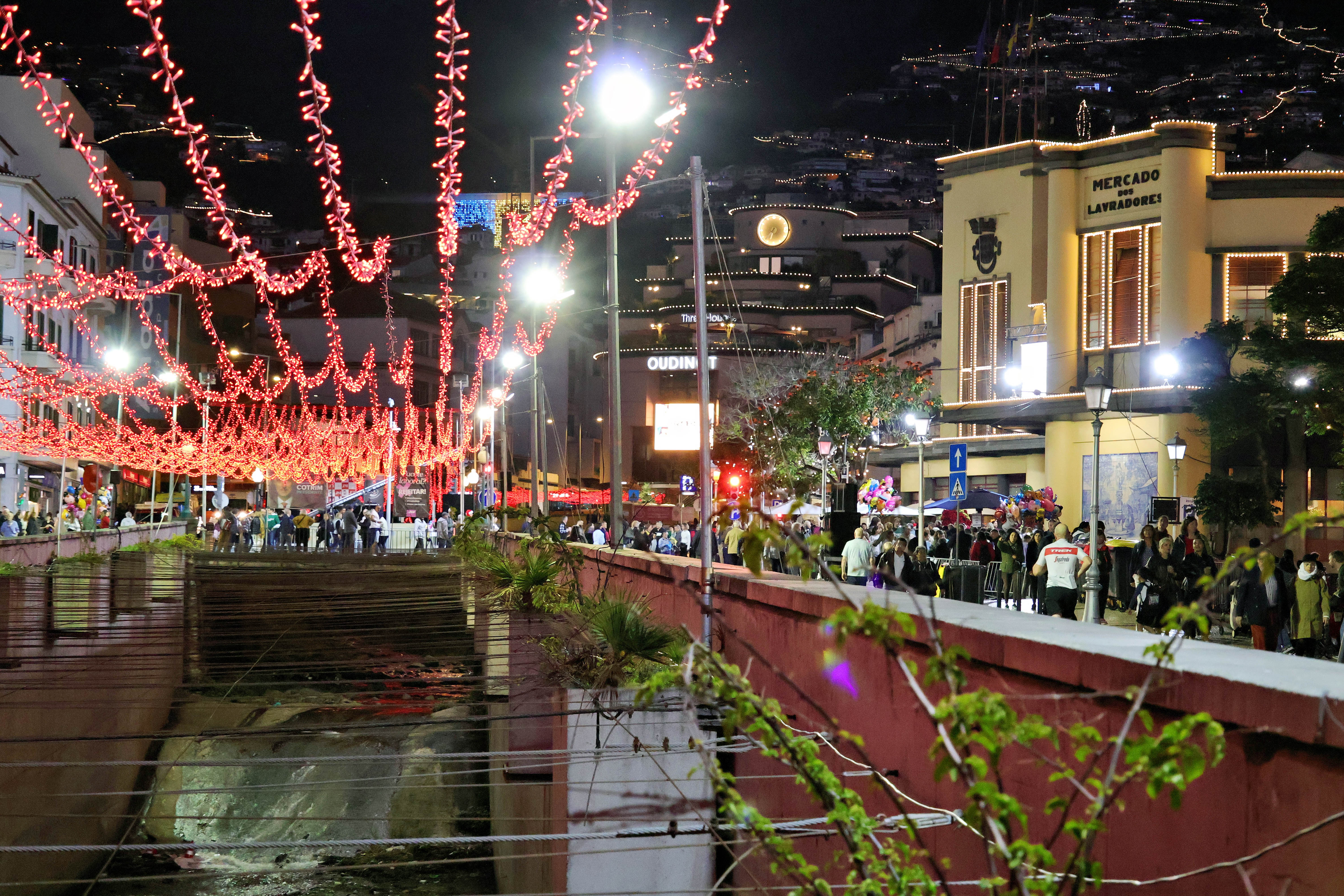
Christmas lights
