= List of freguesias of Portugal: F =

The freguesias (civil parishes) of Portugal are listed here by municipality according to the following format:

- concelho
  - freguesias

== Fafe ==
- Aboim
- Agrela
- Antime
- Ardegão
- Armil
- Arnozela
- Arões (Santa Cristina)
- Arões (São Romão)
- Cepães
- Estorãos
- Fafe
- Fareja
- Felgueiras
- Fornelos
- Freitas
- Golães
- Gontim
- Medelo
- Monte
- Moreira do Rei
- Passos
- Pedraído
- Queimadela
- Quinchães
- Regadas
- Revelhe
- Ribeiros
- São Gens
- Seidões
- Serafão
- Silvares (São Clemente)
- Silvares (São Martinho)
- Travassós
- Várzea Cova
- Vila Cova
- Vinhós

== Faro ==
- Conceição
- Estói
- Faro (São Pedro)
- Faro (Sé)
- Montenegro
- Santa Bárbara de Nexe

== Felgueiras ==
- Aião
- Airães
- Borba de Godim
- Caramos
- Friande
- Idães
- Jugueiros
- Lagares
- Lordelo
- Macieira da Lixa
- Margaride (Santa Eulália)
- Moure
- Pedreira
- Penacova
- Pinheiro
- Pombeiro de Ribavizela
- Rande
- Refontoura
- Regilde
- Revinhade
- Santão
- Sendim
- Sernande
- Sousa
- Torrados
- Unhão
- Várzea
- Varziela
- Vila Cova da Lixa
- Vila Fria
- Vila Verde
- Vizela (São Jorge)

== Ferreira do Alentejo ==
- Alfundão
- Canhestros
- Ferreira do Alentejo
- Figueira dos Cavaleiros
- Odivelas
- Peroguarda

== Ferreira do Zêzere ==
- Águas Belas
- Areias
- Beco
- Chãos
- Dornes
- Ferreira do Zêzere
- Igreja Nova do Sobral
- Paio Mendes
- Pias

== Figueira da Foz ==
- Alhadas
- Alqueidão
- Bom Sucesso
- Borda do Campo
- Brenha
- Buarcos
- Ferreira-a-Nova
- Lavos
- Maiorca
- Marinha das Ondas
- Moinhos da Gândara
- Paião
- Quiaios
- Santana
- São Julião da Figueira da Foz
- São Pedro
- Tavarede
- Vila Verde

== Figueira de Castelo Rodrigo ==
- Algodres
- Almofala
- Castelo Rodrigo
- Cinco Vilas
- Colmeal
- Escalhão
- Escarigo
- Figueira de Castelo Rodrigo
- Freixeda do Torrão
- Mata de Lobos
- Penha de Águia
- Quintã de Pêro Martins
- Reigada
- Vale de Afonsinho
- Vermiosa
- Vilar de Amargo
- Vilar Torpim

== Figueiró dos Vinhos ==
- Aguda
- Arega
- Bairradas
- Campelo
- Figueiró dos Vinhos

== Fornos de Algodres ==
- Algodres
- Casal Vasco
- Cortiçô
- Figueiró da Granja
- Fornos de Algodres
- Fuinhas
- Infias
- Juncais
- Maceira
- Matança
- Muxagata
- Queiriz
- Sobral Pichorro
- Vila Chã
- Vila Ruiva
- Vila Soeiro do Chão

== Freixo de Espada à Cinta ==
- Fornos
- Freixo de Espada à Cinta
- Lagoaça
- Ligares
- Mazouco
- Poiares

== Fronteira ==
- Cabeço de Vide
- Fronteira
- São Saturnino

== Funchal (Madeira) ==
- Imaculado Coração de Maria
- Monte
- Santa Luzia
- Santa Maria Maior
- Santo António
- São Gonçalo
- São Martinho
- São Pedro
- São Roque
- Sé

== Fundão ==
- Alcaide
- Alcaria
- Alcongosta
- Aldeia de Joanes
- Aldeia Nova do Cabo
- Alpedrinha
- Atalaia do Campo
- Barroca
- Bogas de Baixo
- Bogas de Cima
- Capinha
- Castelejo
- Castelo Novo
- Donas
- Enxames
- Escarigo
- Fatela
- Fundão
- Janeiro de Cima
- Lavacolhos
- Mata da Rainha
- Orca
- Pêro Viseu
- Póvoa de Atalaia
- Salgueiro
- Silvares
- Soalheira
- Souto da Casa
- Telhado
- Vale de Prazeres
- Valverde
