= Funchal Municipal Chamber =

Legislative body of Funchal

Coordinates: 32.65001°N 16.90841°W

Funchal Municipal Chamber Câmara Municipal do Funchal
- Coat of arms of the city of Funchal

Type
- Type: Câmara municipal
- Term limits: 3

History
- Founded: 21 August 1508; 517 years ago

Leadership
- President: Cristina Pedra, PSD since 20 October 2021
- Vice President: Bruno Pereira, PSD since 20 October 2021

Structure
- Seats: 11
- Political groups: Municipal Executive (6) PSD (6) Opposition (5) PS (5)
- Length of term: Four years

Elections
- Last election: 26 September 2021
- Next election: Sometime between 22 September and 14 October 2025

Meeting place
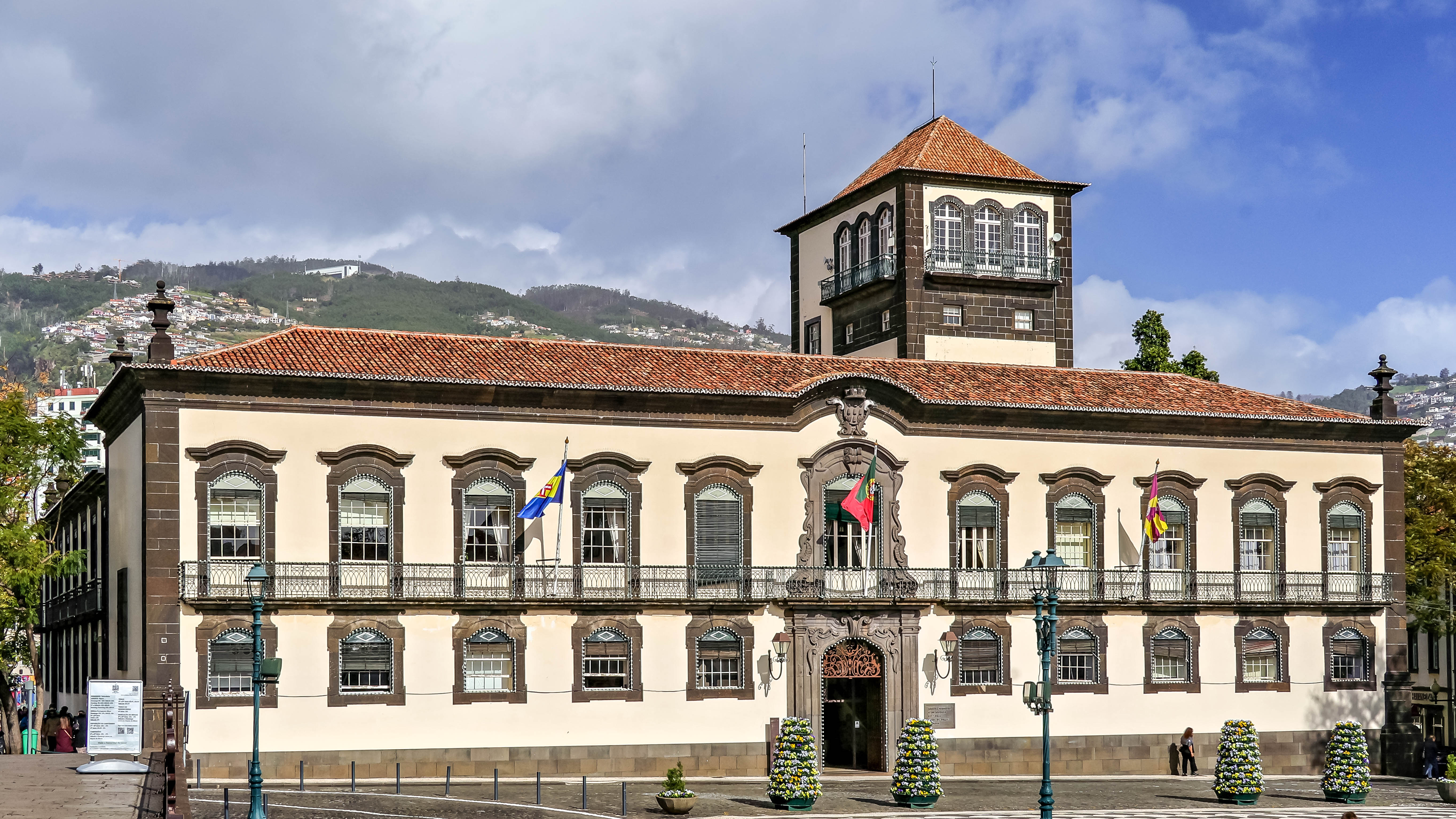
- Paços do Concelho do Funchal

Website
- www.funchal.pt

The Funchal Municipal Chamber (Portuguese: Câmara Municipal do Funchal) is the administrative authority in the municipality of Funchal. It has 10 freguesias in its area of jurisdiction and is based in the city of Funchal, on the Madeira Island. These freguesias are: Imaculado Coração de Maria, Monte, Santa Luzia, Santa Maria Maior, Santo António, São Gonçalo, São Martinho, São Pedro, São Roque and Sé.

The Funchal City Council is made up of 11 councillors, representing, currently, two different political forces. The first candidate on the list with the most votes in a municipal election or, in the event of a vacancy, the next candidate on the list, takes office as President of the Municipal Chamber.

== City Hall building ==
The building is located at the Ferreiros Street, opposite to the Praça do Município or Largo do Colégio, in the freguesia of Sé. It was commissioned in 1758 by the Count of Carvalhal for residential purposes, this building initially served as a private estate. It follows the baroque and rococo styles. In 1820 it was leased to an English wine company named Blackburns & Company.

The construction of the first town hall of the municipality, that had included the notary's palace and courtrooms, probably begun around 1486 and was completed in 1491, however, over time, the old 15th-century building no longer met the needs of the city. After unsuccessful attempts to construct a dedicated municipal building in 1797 and then again between 1864 and 1866, along with various temporary facilities in between, it was decided in 1868 to rent the Carvalhal Esmeraldo Palace to serve as the city hall. It was fully purchased in 1883 and has served in that capacity ever since. It suffered intense restoration works between 1939 and 1940, and since 2014 its partially opened to the public for visits.

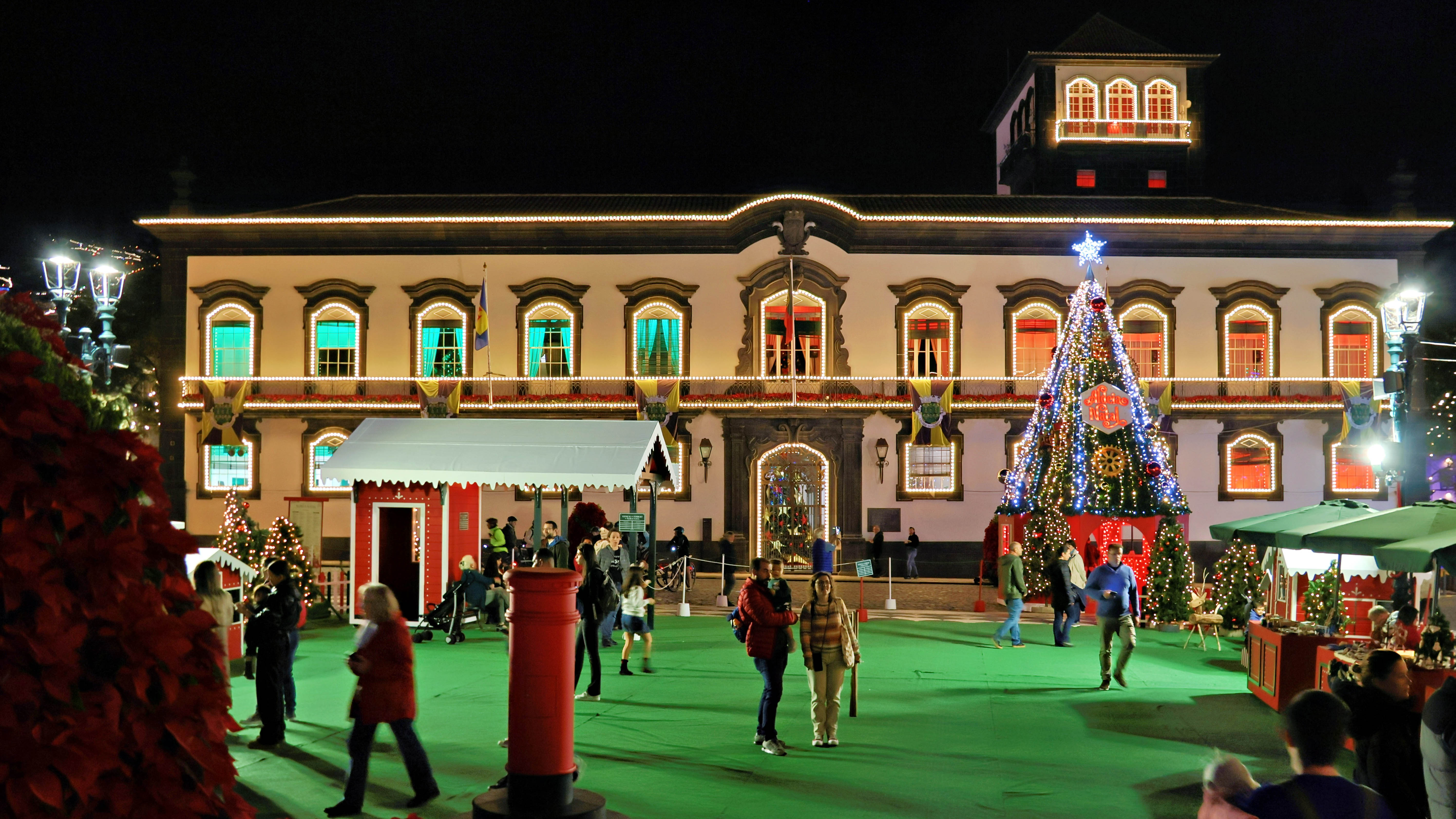
Christmas lights

== Heraldry ==
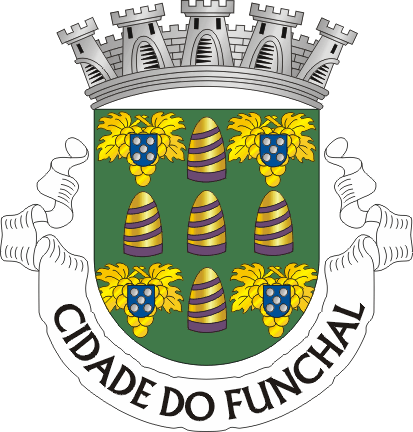
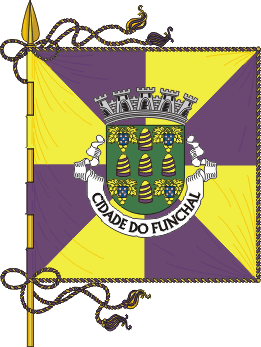
Coat of Arms and Flag of Funchal

The heraldry of this council was published in the Diário do Governo, I Série, of 24 March 1936.

Its coat of arms features a green shield with five golden sugarloaves enhanced in a spiral and with a purple base, placed in a cross, cantoned, by four bunches of gold grapes held and leafed with the same metal, each bunch carried by a blue quina charged with five silver besantes, in aspersion. It is topped by a mural silver crown with five towers. In the bottom there’s a stripe with the black legend saying “Cidade do Funchal” (City of Funchal).

The flag either follows the standard 2×3 resolution or the square format, for use as an outdoor mast or as an indoor or parade banner. It has four yellow and four purple stripes that converge to the middle of the flag, that’s centered by the municipality's coat of arms.

== List of the Presidents of the Municipal Chamber of Funchal ==
- Fernão de Ornelas – (1935–1946)
- Óscar Baltasar Gonçalves – (1947–19??)
- António Bettencourt Sardinha – (1953–19??)
- Fernando José Martins de Almeida Couto – (1965–1972)
- António de Agrela Gomes Loja – (1972–1974)
- Óscar Saturnino Pereira – (1974)
- Virgílio Pereira – (1974–1982)
- João Manuel Coutinho Sá Fernandes – (1982–1985)
- João Heliodoro da Silva Dantas – (1985–1993)
- Virgílio Pereira – (1993–1994)
- Miguel Albuquerque – (1994–2013)
- Paulo Cafôfo – (2013–2019)
- Miguel Silva Gouveia – (2019–2021)
- Pedro Calado – (2021–2024)
- Cristina Pedra – (2024–2025)
