= Levada do Curral e Castelejo =

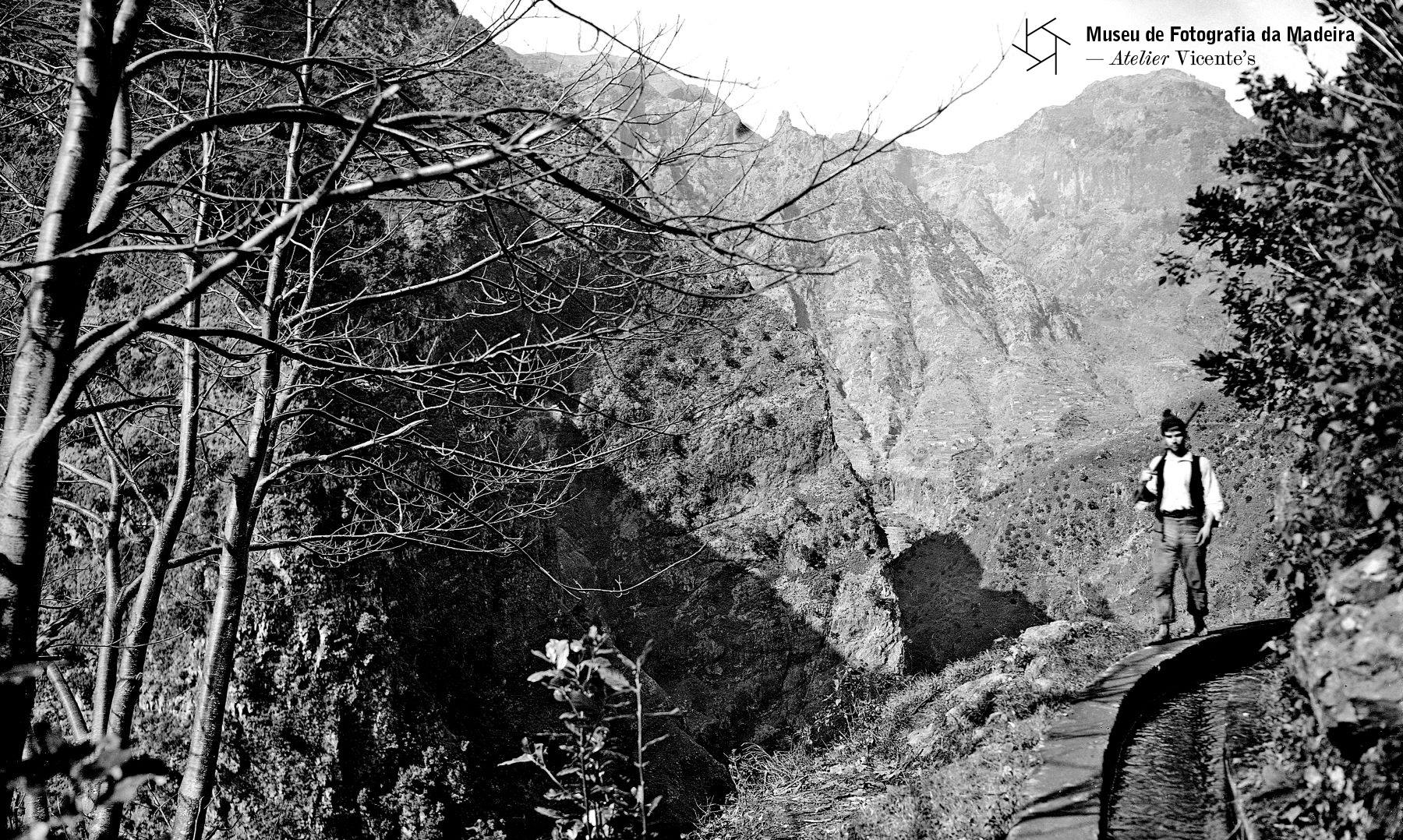
Levada do Curral, after 1930

Levada do Curral e Castelejo is a levada on the island of Madeira. It connects Curral das Freiras to Funchal and runs past an abandoned village called Fajã do Poio; this levada is the only access to the village.

The levada was made to carry water from Curral das Freiras to irrigate the land in Santo António, Santa Quitéria and São Martinho.

Levada do Curral e Castelejo is around ten km long and takes four to five hours to walk. It is almost as dangerous as beautiful.
