= São Pedro (Funchal) =

- Civil parish
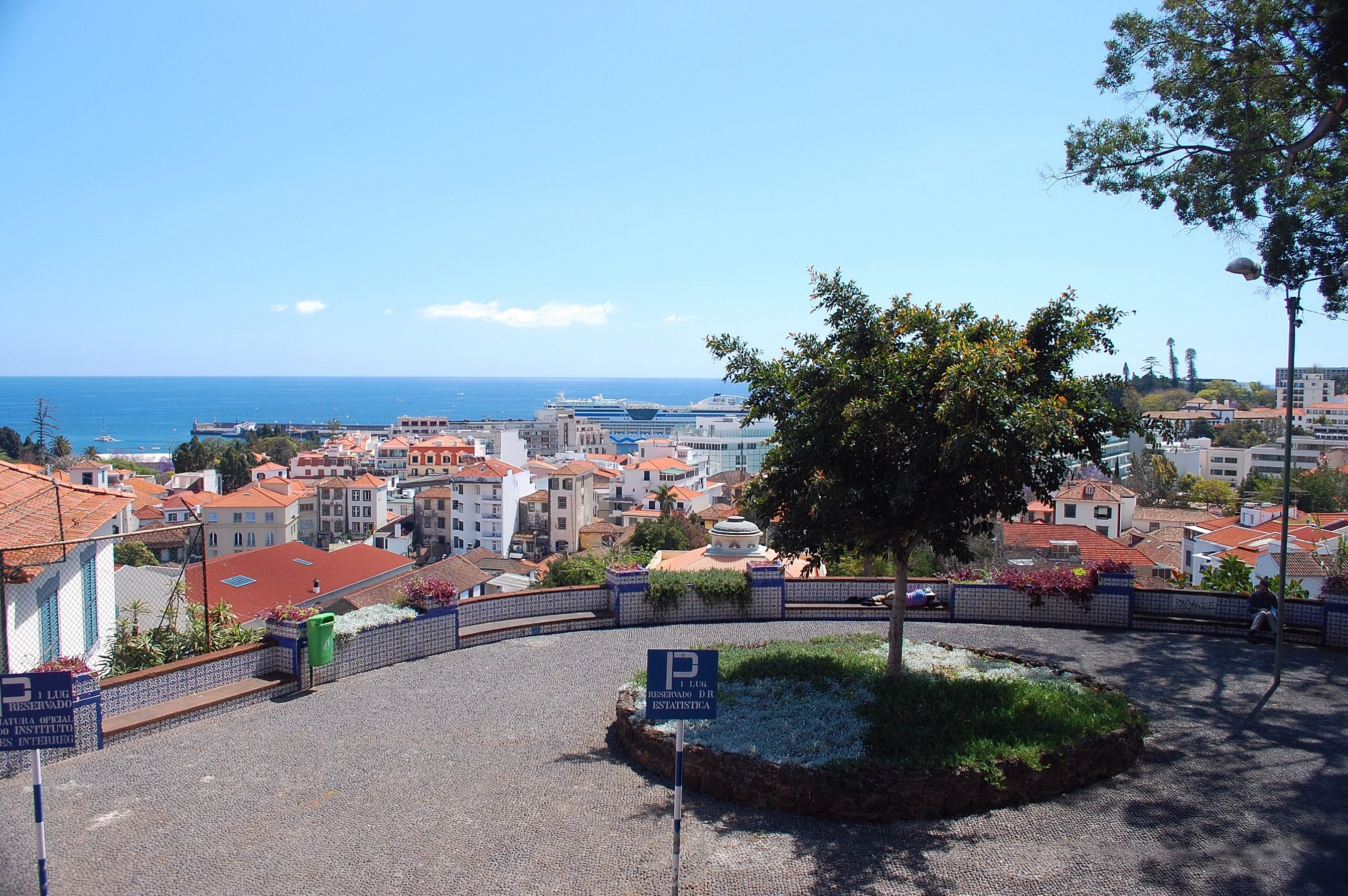
- The city of Funchal as seen from the lookout at Largo das Cruzes in São Pedro

- Location in Madeira
- Coordinates: 32°39′8″N 16°55′11″W
- Country: Portugal
- Auton. region: Madeira
- Island: Madeira
- Municipality: Funchal
- Established: Settlement: fl. 1490; Parish: 20 July 1566; Civil parish: 14 August 1587

Area
  - Total: 1.49 km^{2} (0.58 sq mi)
- Elevation: 90 m (300 ft)

Population (2011)
  - Total: 7,273
  - Density: 4,880/km^{2} (12,600/sq mi)
- Time zone: UTC+00:00 (WET)
  - Summer (DST): UTC+01:00 (WEST)
- Postal code: 9000-048
- Area code: 291
- Patron: São Pedro
- Website: www.jfsaopedro.com

São Pedro (Portuguese for "Saint Peter") is a civil parish in the municipality of Funchal in the island of Madeira. The population in 2011 was 7,273, in an area of 1.49 km².

São Pedro is located north of Sé and central to the municipality, surrounded by the parishes of Santo António, Santa Luzia, Imaculado Coração de Maria, São Roque and São Martinho.

== Notable people ==
- Cristiano Ronaldo
