= Lido Bathing Complex =

Open air sea water pool in Funchal, Madeira, Portugal

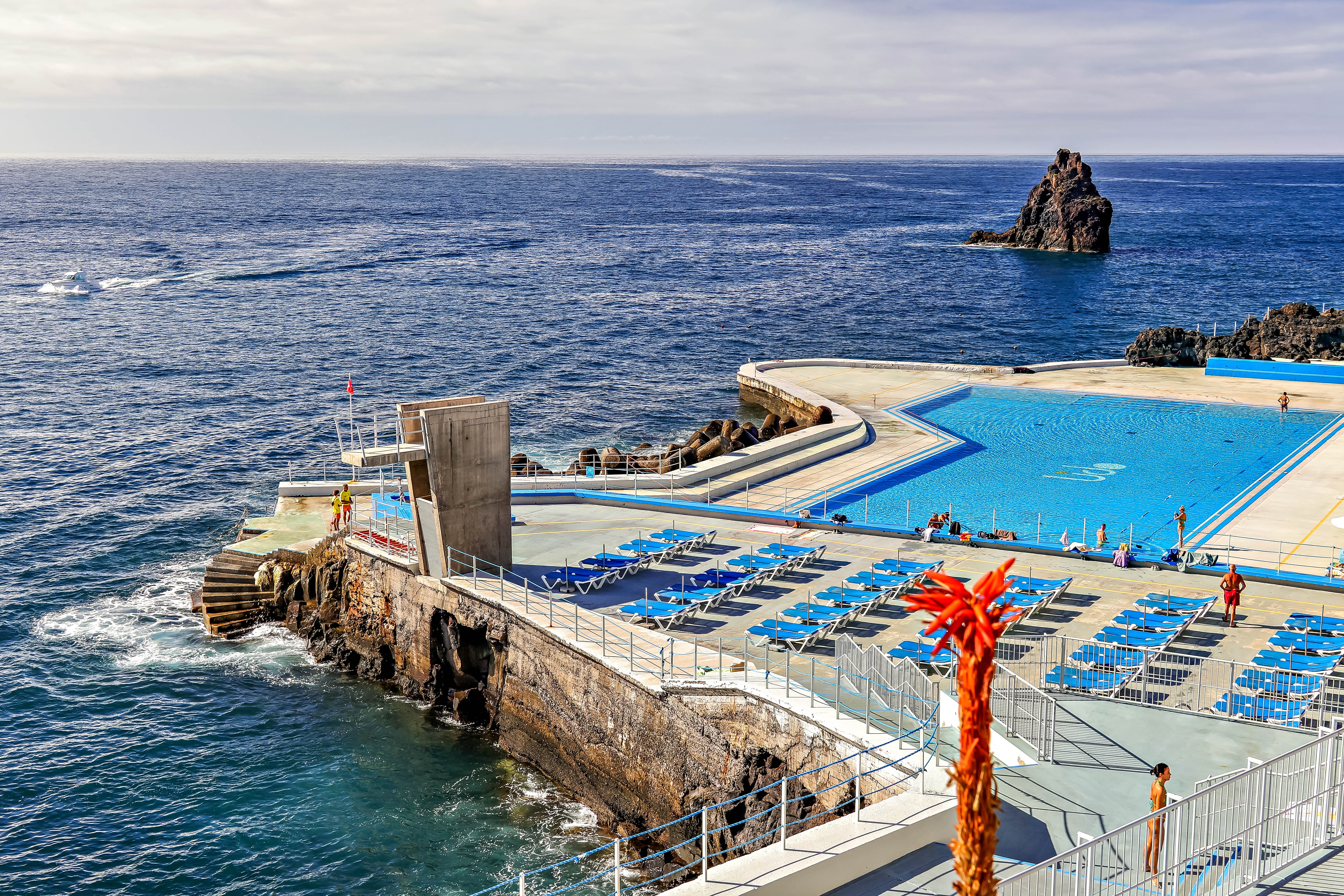
- Lido Bathing Complex
- Interactive map of Lido Bathing Complex
- Location: São Martinho, Funchal, Madeira
- Coordinates: 32°38′07″N 16°55′56″W
- Type: open air

Construction
- Opened: 1932
- Architect: José Rafael Botelho

Lido Bathing Complex is a large lido in São Martinho, Funchal, Madeira.

== History ==
Opened in 1932, the complex had to be closed on 20 February 2010 due to the damage caused by the 2010 Madeira floods and mudslides. After extensive repairs were done, the complex reopened in late 2015.
