= Dornes =

Dornes may refer to:

- Dornes, Nièvre, France (commune)
- Dornes, Portugal, town in Portugal
