= Zêzere =

Zêzere may refer to:

- Zêzere River
- Zêzere Castle - in Vila Nova da Barquinha Municipality;
- Dornelas do Zêzere - uma freguesia portuguesa do concelho da Pampilhosa da Serra Municipality;
- Ferreira do Zêzere - um concelho português banhado pelo rio do mesmo nome;
- Ferreira do Zêzere (freguesia)
- Santa Marinha do Zêzere - uma freguesia portuguesa do concelho de Baião Municipality.
