= Igreja de São Martinho =

Church in São Martinho, Portugal

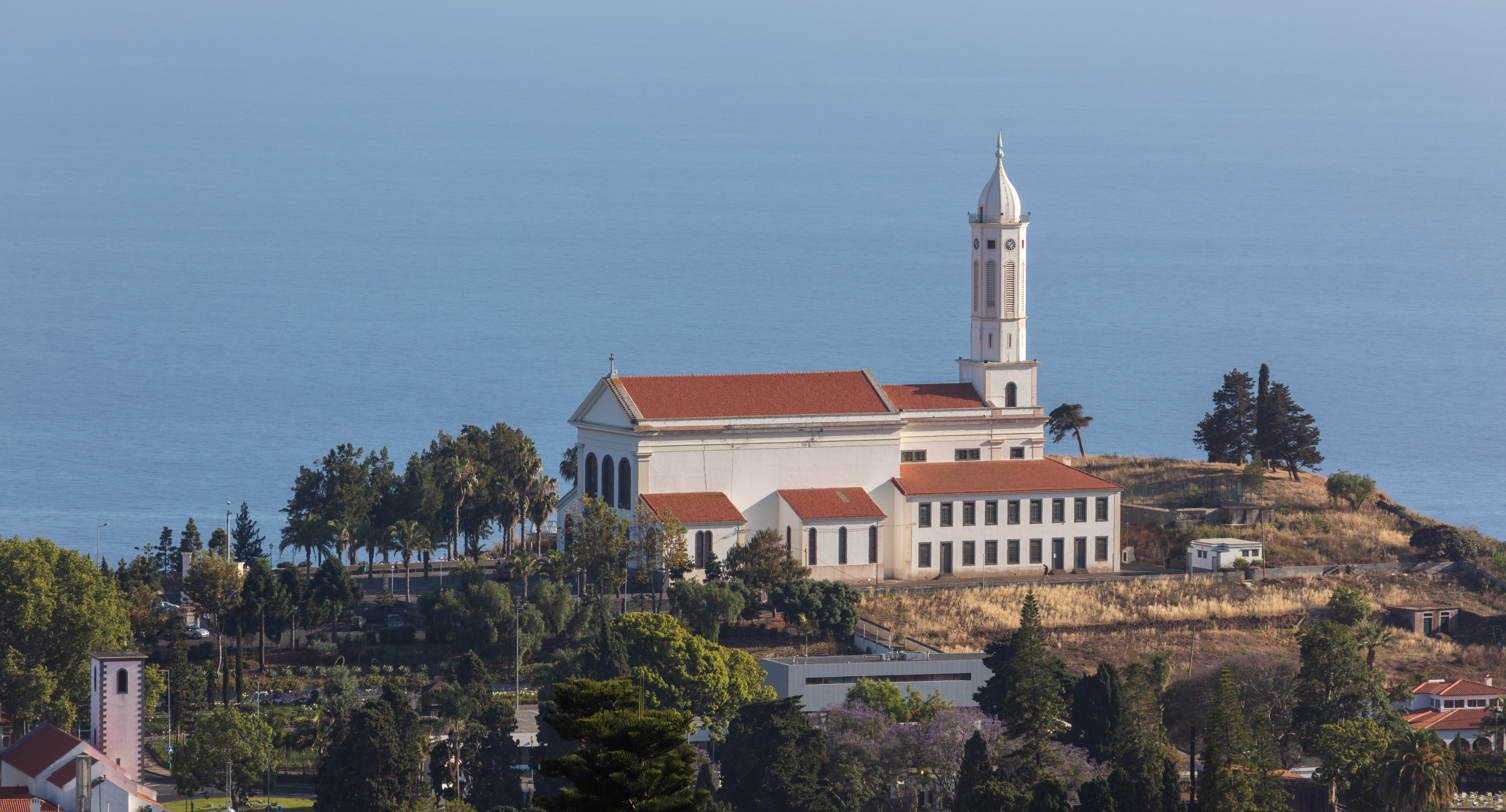

- Location within Madeira

Religion
- Affiliation: Roman Catholic
- Festival: St Martin's day (Festa de São Martinho or Arraial de São Martinho in Portuguese)
- Year consecrated: June 24, 1918

Location
- Location: São Martinho, Madeira.
- Coordinates: 32°38′56.9″N 16°56′38.3″W

Architecture
- Groundbreaking: July 8, 1883
- Completed: 1918

Website
- www.paroquiasmartinho.com

The Church of St Martin (Portuguese: Igreja de São Martinho) is the main church in the Freguesia (Parish in English) of São Martinho (Funchal), Madeira. Dedicated to St. Martin of Tours.

== History ==
The old church at the bottom of the hill had become too small for the area and so construction started on July 8, 1883 on the current church of the same name, with the first stone being laid. Lack of founds halted construction until August 2, 1907, when the local parishioner José de Abreu died leaving almost all of his fortune, which for the time was large, to the continuation of the works of the same church.

== Festival ==
The main festival that is celebrated is St Martin's day (Festa de São Martinho or Arraial de São Martinho in Portuguese) celebrated on the 10 and 11 November in the grounds of the church, where fires are made by locals and local food is made such as roasted chestnuts (Marking the beginning of the new chestnut harvest season), Espetada, Bolo do caco, and Bacalhau. The grapes that were harvested a few months before and made into wine, are first tasted on this day.

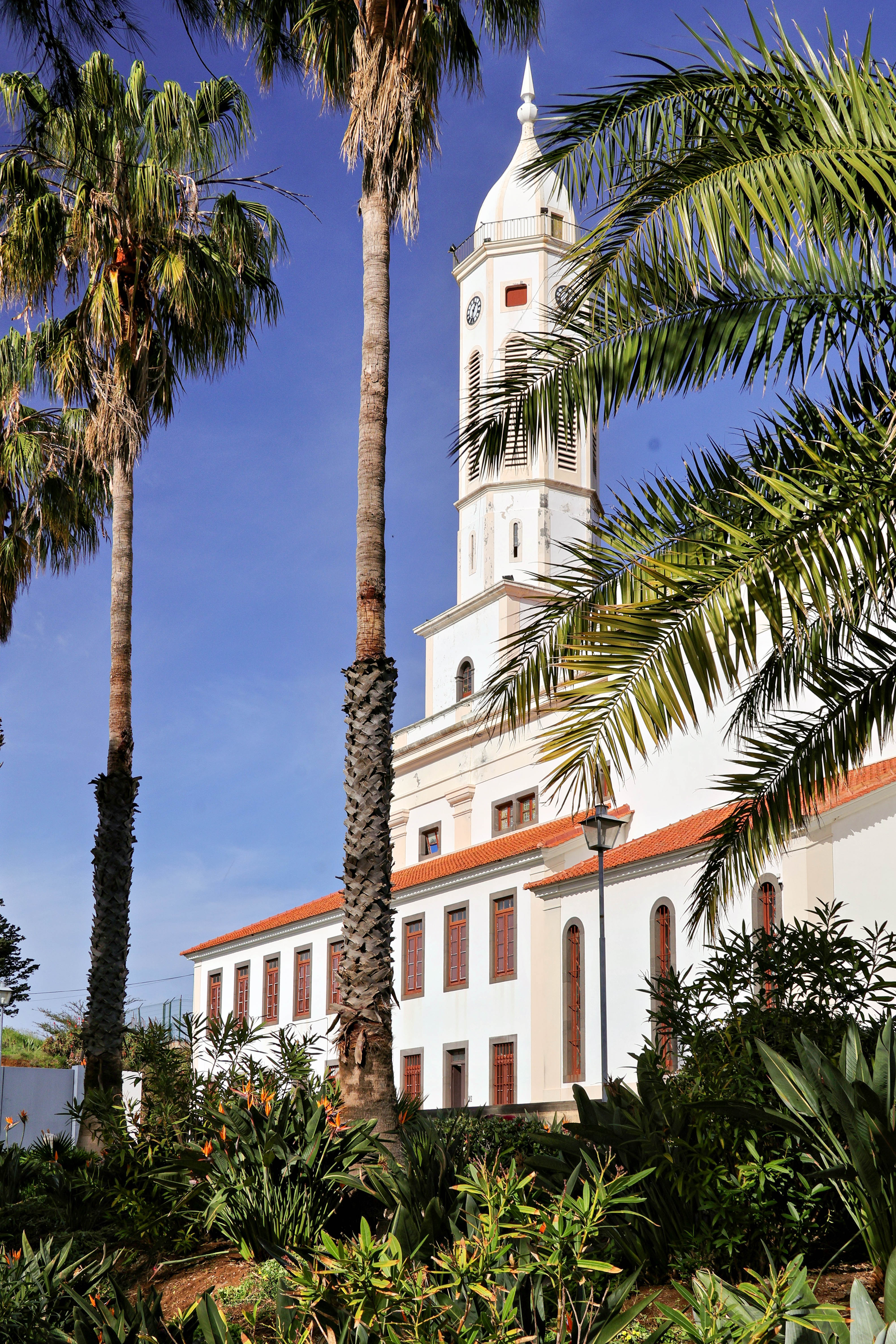
The south side of the church
