= Nossa Senhora do Pranto =

- Civil parish
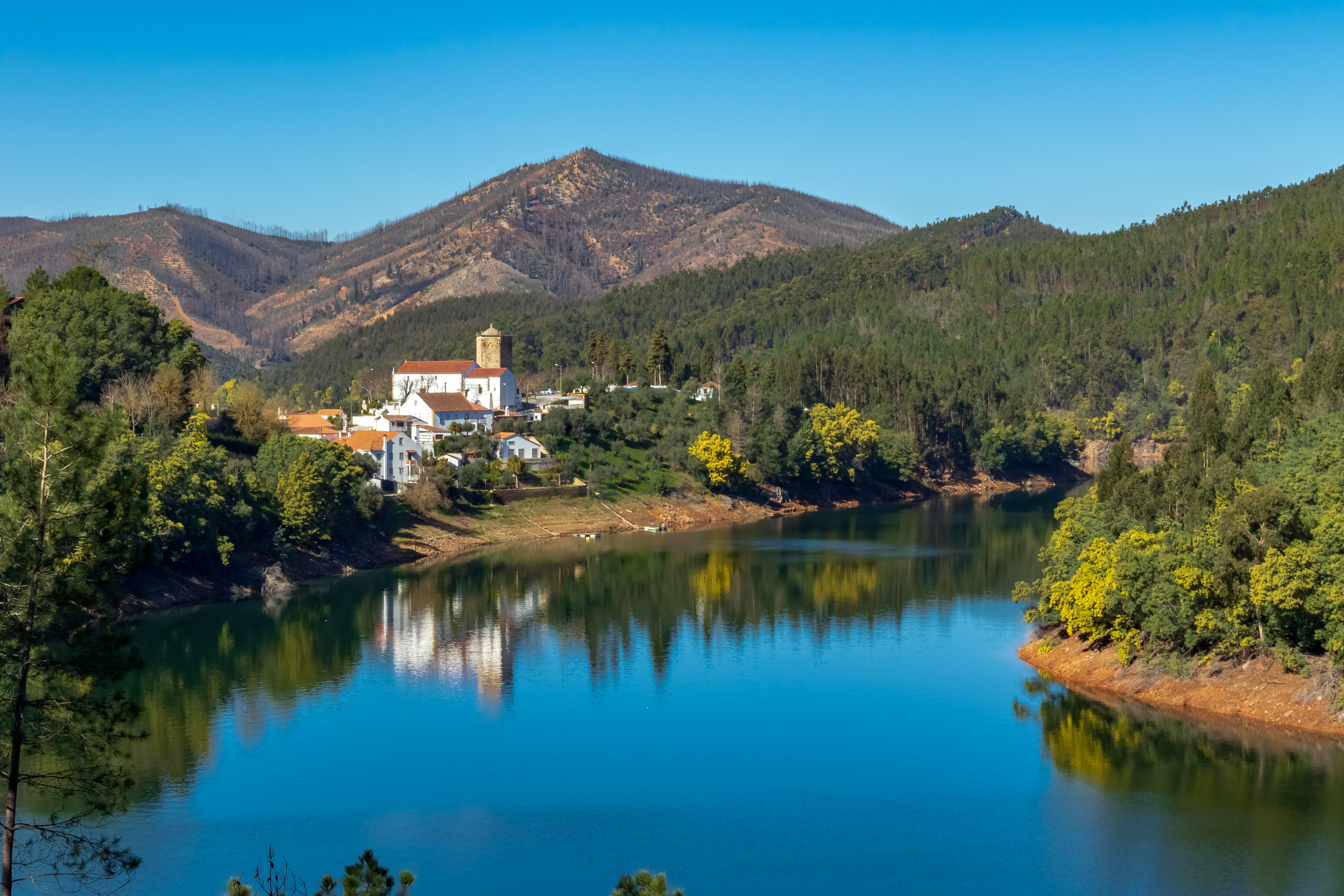
- View of Dornes in 2019

- Location in Portugal
- Coordinates: 39.75°N 8.28°W
- Country: Portugal
- Region: Oeste e Vale do Tejo
- Intermunic. comm.: Médio Tejo
- District: Santarém
- Municipality: Ferreira do Zêzere

Area
  - Total: 30.48 km^{2} (11.77 sq mi)

Population (2011)
  - Total: 1,089
  - Density: 35.73/km^{2} (92.54/sq mi)
- Time zone: UTC+00:00 (WET)
  - Summer (DST): UTC+01:00 (WEST)

Nossa Senhora do Pranto is a civil parish in the municipality of Ferreira do Zêzere, Portugal. It was formed in 2013 by the merger of the former parishes Paio Mendes and Dornes. The population in 2011 was 1089, in an area of 30.48 km^{2} (11.77 sq mi).
