= São Roque (Funchal) =

- Civil parish
- Location in Madeira
- Coordinates: 32°40′24″N 16°55′30″W
- Country: Portugal
- Auton. region: Madeira
- Island: Madeira
- Municipality: Funchal
- Established: Parish: 3 March 1579

Area
  - Total: 7.50 km^{2} (2.90 sq mi)
- Elevation: 378 m (1,240 ft)

Population (2011)
  - Total: 9,385
  - Density: 1,250/km^{2} (3,240/sq mi)
- Time zone: UTC+00:00 (WET)
  - Summer (DST): UTC+01:00 (WEST)
- Postal code: 9020-155
- Area code: 291
- Patron: Saint Roch

São Roque is a civil parish in the northern part of the municipality of Funchal, on the island of Madeira. The population in 2011 was 9,385, in an area of 7.50 km^{2}.

== History ==
The lands associated with São Roque were once part of a much larger parish of Sé, but later, for a short period it was part of São Pedro. The eccliastical parish of São Roque was dismembered from São Pedro and neighbouring São Martinho by Cardinal Infante Henrique on 3 March 1579. The Cardinal authorised the prelate of Funchal to create a new parish within the dominion of Sé. This was instituted with its parish seat at the ancient chapel of São Roque, constructed by the residents at the beginning of the 16th century, probably from local funds collected by Funchal's citizens (Saint Roch was the patron saint of Funchal protecting them from the plague, during the early part of the 16th century).

The small chapel provided its name to a church later erected in 1704, not far from the original building (which remains standing, and is referred to locally as the Igreja Velha, or small church, in Portuguese). That church was ruined by 1790. A newer church, directed by master António Vila Vicêncio, was later erected; its main construction continued until 1820, but was finally completed in the middle of the 19th century.

== Geography ==
São Roque is connected by regional roadway with Monte, Funchal and Faial, and towards São Martinho and northwest to Santo António. São Roque is not connected with the urban sprawl of Funchal, but developed from the concentration of agricultural use lands, developing into a suburban nucleus later. This includes several of its localities, which were formed from rural concentrations, and developed into residential boroughs by the 20th century: Achada, Muro da Coelha, Conceição, Fundoa, Igreja Velha, Calhau, Igreja Nova, Alegria, Bugiaria, Lombo Segundo, Lombo de São João and Santana.

== Economy ==
Until the mid-20th century, the region was primarily agricultural, but the southern limits of the parish have now been developed extensively towards the foothills of the central mountain range.
