= Maria Benedita Mouzinho de Albuquerque de Faria Pinho =

Portuguese feminist

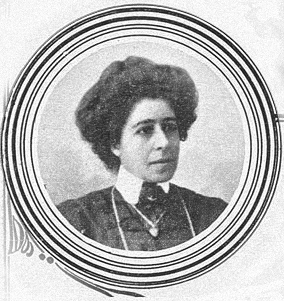
- Born: 5 April 1865; Figueiró dos Vinhos, Leiria District, Portugal
- Died: 12 January 1939 (aged 73); Lisbon
- Occupations: Writer, translator
- Known for: Feminist and republican activist

Maria Benedita Mouzinho de Albuquerque de Faria Pinho (1865 - 1939), was a Portuguese writer, translator, teacher, propagandist, republican activist and feminist activist. She was a pioneer in the campaign to get women the right to vote and for the legalisation of divorce.

== Early life ==
Maria Benedita Mouzinho de Albuquerque de Faria Pinho was born in Figueiró dos Vinhos in the Leiria District of Portugal on 5 April 1865. She was the daughter of a politician and journalist who was also the administrator of the municipality of Figueiró dos Vinhos. Her mother was a granddaughter of the former governor of Madeira, military officer and politician Luís da Silva Mouzinho de Albuquerque. Pinho was the third of the couple's seven children.

Born into an aristocratic family, Pinho had a thorough education, that focussed on the study of classical and modern languages, philosophy, politics and literature. Also due to her family background, she was provided, from a very young age, with an easy access via letters to some of the most celebrated national figures of the Portuguese political scene at the time, including the future president of the Republic Bernardino Machado, who was a strong influence. Writers, poets, painters and journalists were frequent visitors to her family's home.

== Activism ==
At the age of 17, in July 1882, she married a general and military engineer, Joaquim Lúcio Lobo, in the Leiria Cathedral. He had been born in Leiria and was fourteen years older than Pinho. They had one daughter. However, due to her husband's frequent absences on duty and various personality differences, their relationship quickly became quite unstable. In 1909, still married but separated, she moved to Lisbon, where she started to work as a teacher. She joined the Liga das Mulheres Republicanas (Republican League of Portuguese Women) an association of a political and feminist nature, which announced its purpose as "guiding, educating and instructing Portuguese women in democratic principles" and "promoting the revision of laws that especially interest women and children". The League had been formed by the writer and journalist Ana de Castro Osório, who would become a leading member of the feminist movement. Pinho was a member of the League's first board of management and was secretary of the general assembly that officially founded it. She was also a member of the steering committee of the League's magazine A Mulher e a Criança, which had the aim of addressing "political-social, historical and educational issues, especially of women and children". She resigned a year later over disputes about editorial freedom.

In 1911, with the approval of a divorce law over which the League had considerable influence, Pinho divorced her husband. He died in 1953 at the age of 101, at that time the oldest surviving Portuguese army officer.

In 1914, after the outbreak of the First World War in Europe, together with other activists Ana Augusta de Castilho, Ana de Castro Osório and Antónia Bermudes, she founded the Women's Commission known as Pela Pátria. This was aimed at mobilizing women for the war effort, assisting families displaced from their homes due to the damaging effects of the war, and also assisting soldiers mobilized to the front and their families. They published a magazine called A Semeadora to promote their cause and call for donations. This was subsequently merged into the Portuguese Women's Crusade (Cruzada das Mulheres Portuguesas), after Germany's declaration of war on Portugal on 9 March 1916. The Crusade had similar aims of collecting donations to send to Portuguese soldiers and also to help war orphans and was headed by Elzira Dantas Machado, wife of the now-president, Bernadino Machado.

== Publications ==
Despite having a considerable family fortune, Pinho always sought to maintain her financial autonomy. She translated works by Belgian, French and Russian authors, such as Hector Fleischmann, Alphonse Karr, Paul Margueritte, Victor Margueritte, the Condessa de Gencé and Leo Tolstoy, translating his The Kreutzer Sonata. She also wrote articles on women's rights and her republican ideals, publishing them in various magazines of the time. Pinho also published several novels, such as Marina (1912), O Vagabundo (1913) and Sonho Desfeito (1922), as well as several collections of stories for young children, such as As Rosas do Menino Jesus (1923) with illustrations by Mily Possoz or As Andorinhas (1915), a book of short stories, whose total proceeds went to Pela-Pátria. She also did translations for the O Mundo newspaper, having used her influence with Machado to get him to persuade the publishers to employ her.

== Death ==
Pinho died on 12 January 1939 in Lisbon. She had been suffering from dementia. She is buried in the Ajuda Cemetery, in Lisbon. She had already been ill in 1917 when A Semeadora announced that she was stepping down from the magazine for health reasons, although she continued to write for some years.
