= Figueiró dos Vinhos =

- Municipality
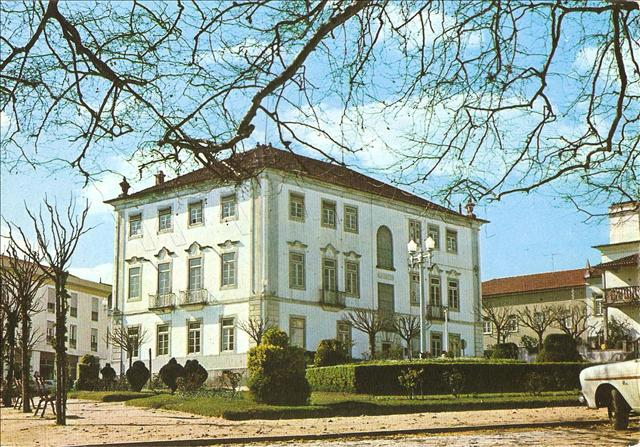

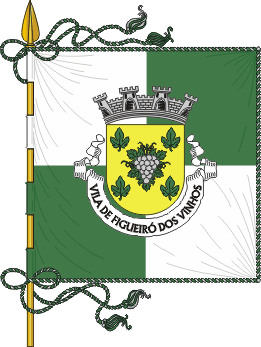
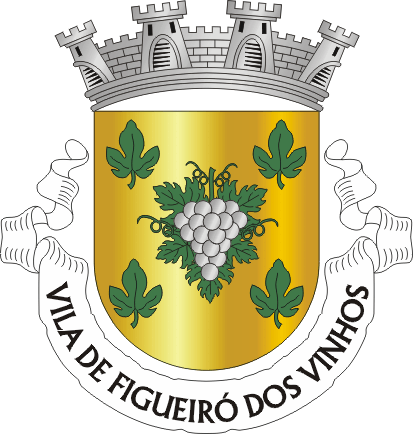
- Flag Coat of arms
- Interactive map of Figueiró dos Vinhos
- Location in Portugal
- Coordinates: 39°54′N 8°16′W
- Country: Portugal
- Region: Centro
- Intermunic. comm.: Região de Leiria
- District: Leiria
- Parishes: 4

Government
  - President: Jorge Abreu (PS)

Area
  - Total: 173.44 km^{2} (66.97 sq mi)

Population (2021)
  - Total: 5,281
  - Density: 30.45/km^{2} (78.86/sq mi)
- Time zone: UTC+00:00 (WET)
  - Summer (DST): UTC+01:00 (WEST)
- Local holiday: John the Baptist; June 6
- Website: http://www.cm-figueirodosvinhos.pt

Figueiró dos Vinhos (Portuguese pronunciation: [fiɣɐjˈɾɔ ðuʒ ˈviɲuʃ]) is a portuguese city in the historical Beira Litoral province, in Central Region and district of Leiria. The population in 2021 was 5,281 , in an area of 173.44 km².

== Demographics ==
Population of Figueiró dos Vinhos Municipality (1801–2011)
1801	1849	1900	1930	1960	1981	1991	2001	2004	2011
2430	5068	9702	10699	11545	8754	8012	7352	7080	6169

== Parishes ==
Administratively, the municipality is divided into 4 civil parishes (freguesias):

- Aguda
- Arega
- Campelo
- Figueiró dos Vinhos e Bairradas

== Notable people ==
- Maria Benedita Mouzinho de Albuquerque de Faria Pinho (1865-1939) a Portuguese writer, translator, teacher, propagandist, republican activist and feminist activist.
- José Simões de Almeida (1880–1950) a Portuguese naturalist sculptor.
