= Dornes, Portugal =

Former municipality and parish in Portugal

Dornes
- Civil parish
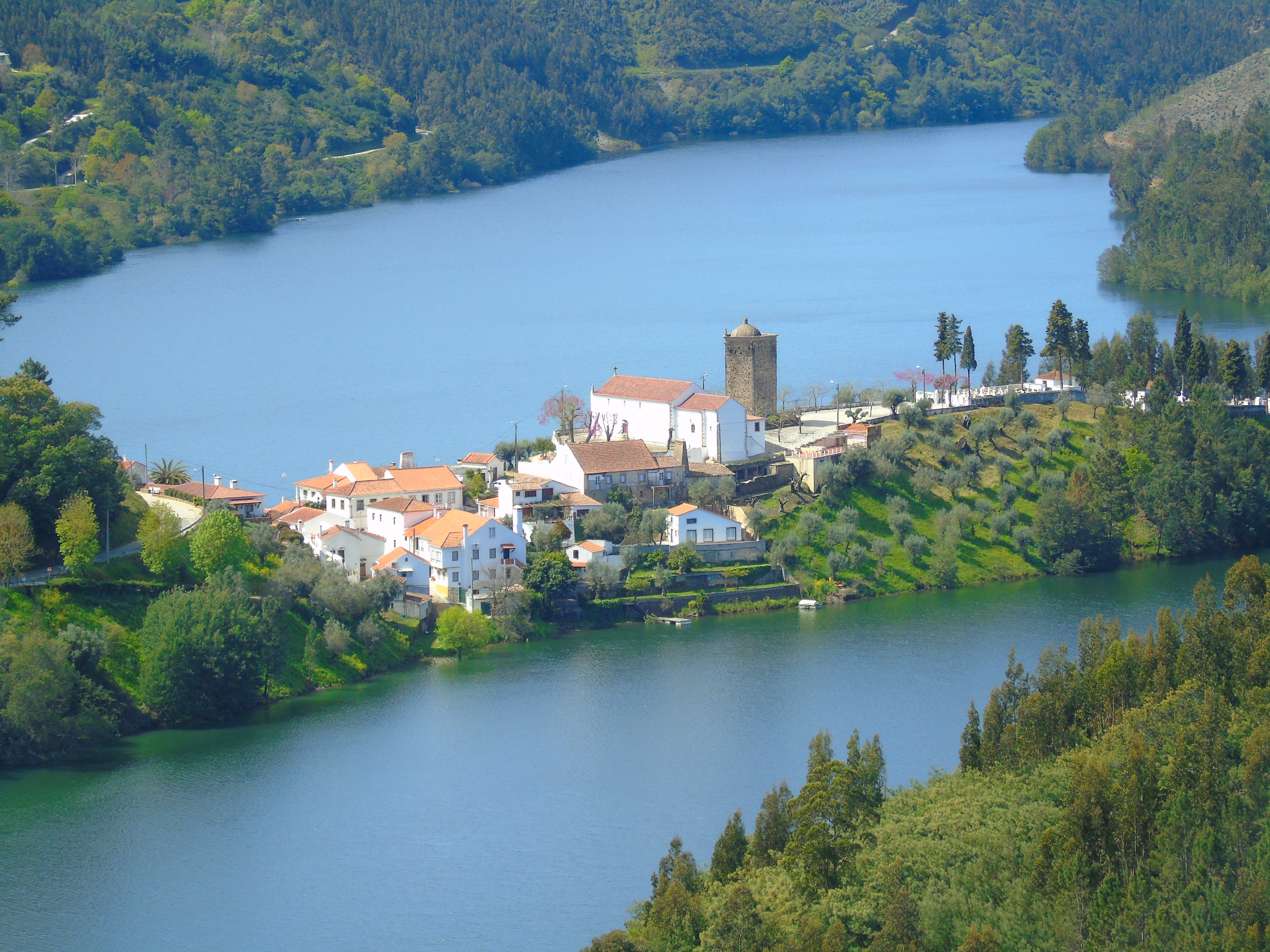
- View of Dornes and it's peninsula in 2016

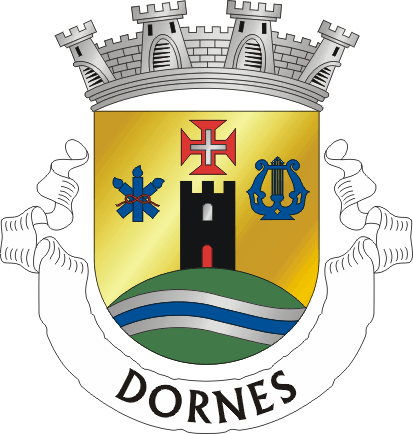
- Coat of arms

- Location in Portugal
- Coordinates: 39°46′13″N 8°16′8″W
- Country: Portugal
- Region: Centro
- Intermunic. comm.: Médio Tejo
- District: Santarém
- Municipality: Ferreira do Zêzere

Area
  - Total: 21.91 km^{2} (8.46 sq mi)

Population (2011)
  - Total: 594
  - Density: 27.1/km^{2} (70.2/sq mi)
- Time zone: UTC+00:00 (WET)
  - Summer (DST): UTC+01:00 (WEST)

Dornes is a town located in the municipality of Ferreira do Zêzere, in Portugal. It was the seat of the freguesia (parish) of Dornes, extinct in 2013, that had 21,91 km² of area and 594 inhabitants (2011), thereby having a population density of 27,1 hab/km².

The parish of Dornes was extinct in 2013, following a national administrative reform, so that, together with the parish of Paio Mendes, it could form the new parish of Nossa Senhora do Pranto with seat in the town of Frazoeira.

Dornes is located in a small peninsula carved by the Zêzere River, in the north of the Santarém District.

It was a municipality between 1513 and 1836. It consisted of a territory that included the parishes of Dornes, Beco and Paio Mendes.

The parish of Dornes, besides the history town of Dornes, included the settlements of Barrada, Cagida, Carril, Casal Ascenso Antunes, Casal da Mata, Frazoeira, Joaninho, Junqueira, Lameirancha, Macieira da Rocha, Peralfaia, Quinta da Benta, Quintas, Ribeiro da Coroa, Rio Cimeiro, Rio Fundeiro, Salão de Baixo, Salão de Cima and Vale Serrão.

Among the many distinguished visitors throght the ages, Alfredo Keil's 1890 visit stands out. Whilst staying at a local inn in the village of Carril, he rehearsed the first orchestral arrangement of the march A Portuguesa, making Dornes one of the birthplaces of Portugal’s current national anthem.

== Population ==
Population of the parish of Dornes
1864	1878	1890	1900	1911	1920	1930	1940	1950	1960	1970	1981	1991	2001	2011
1 011	1 029	1 041	1 146	1 367	1 410	1 503	1 593	1 568	1 241	996	878	796	714	594

Distribution of the population by age groups
Age group	0-14	15-24	25-64	> 65	0-14	15-24	25-64	> 65
2001	98	81	334	201	13,7%	11,3%	46,8%	28,2%
2011	72	52	259	211	12,1%	8,8%	43,6%	35,5%
