= Imaculado Coração de Maria =

- Civil parish
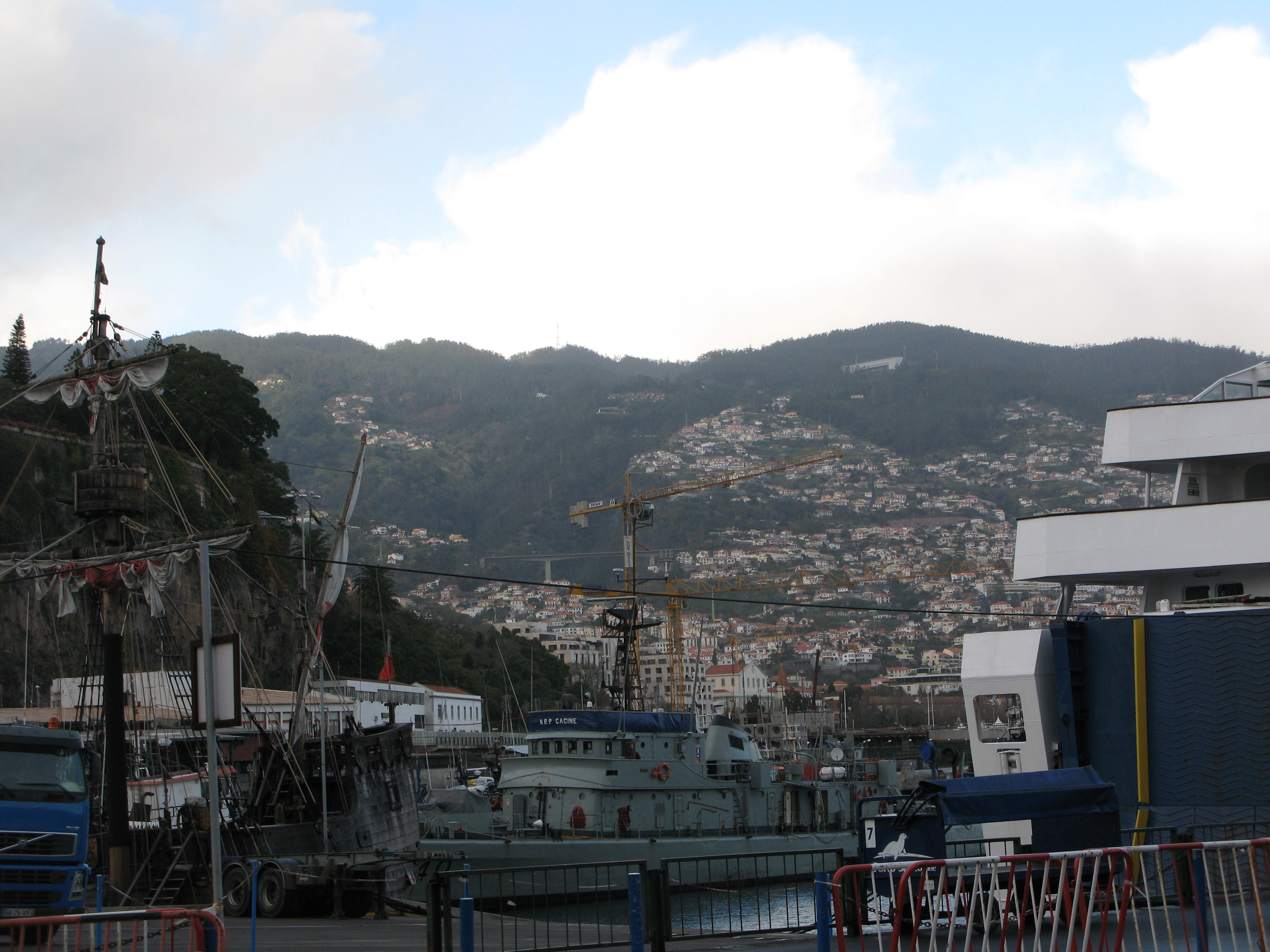
- From the Port of Funchal, looking towards the valley and escarpment of Imaculado Coração de Maria

- Location in Madeira
- Coordinates: 32°39′43″N 16°54′51″W
- Country: Portugal
- Auton. region: Madeira
- Island: Madeira
- Municipality: Funchal
- Established: Settlement: fl. 1508; Parish: 26 November 1954

Area
  - Total: 1.36 km^{2} (0.53 sq mi)
- Elevation: 182 m (597 ft)

Population (2011)
  - Total: 6,207
  - Density: 4,560/km^{2} (11,800/sq mi)
- Time zone: UTC+00:00 (WET)
  - Summer (DST): UTC+01:00 (WEST)
- Postal code: 9050-071
- Area code: 291
- Patron: Blessed Virgin Mary
- Website: www.jfimaculado.pt

Imaculado Coração de Maria (English: Immaculate Heart of Mary) is a civil parish in the municipality of Funchal in the archipelago of Madeira. Imaculado Coração de Maria, which is Portuguese for The Immaculate Heart of Mary, is a suburb of Funchal. The population in 2011 was 6,207, in an area of 1.36 km^{2}.

== History ==
At the end of the 20th century, the growth of Funchal along the Ribeira de Santa Luzia and along the Monte Railway (which linked Funchal until Terreiro da Luta) caused the growth in settlement along the rural roadways, forcing the creation of new industries and further settlement. Meanwhile, along the coast of Funchal, new groups of residential and leisure-related activities, with parks and exotic gardens began to progressively replace older rural activities. With the occupation of lower Funchal by factories, the zones of habitation began to progressively appear around Funchal, forming new nodes of new activity. In 1940, the city of Funchal underwent a profound renovation, spearheaded by Dr. Fernão Ornelas, that resulted in a modernization of the infrastructures to complement the tourist industry; there was new construction, alterations to improve accessibility, the paving of new roadways, new administrative buildings, hotels and waterworks to support the increasing number of services along the coast.

Imaculado Coração de Maria was one of the emerging communities around central Funchal. Since the beginning of the 20th century, the faith community had shown their devotion to the Sacred Heart of Jesus and the Immaculate Heart of Mary, especially with the residency of Charles I of Austria, who was a devotee and who would later die while in exile (February 1922).

On 26 November 1954, Imaculado Coração de Maria was elevated to the status of civil parish, due to the significant demographic increases.

At about the same time, a new parish church was ordered constructed by diocese prelate, D. António Manuel Ribeiro. The large project was designed by architect Chorão Ramalho, who in turn produced a large modern building plan, or basilica, that was only completed 40 years later (it would be one of the modern projects best associated with the Portuguese architect during the 20th century).

== Geography ==
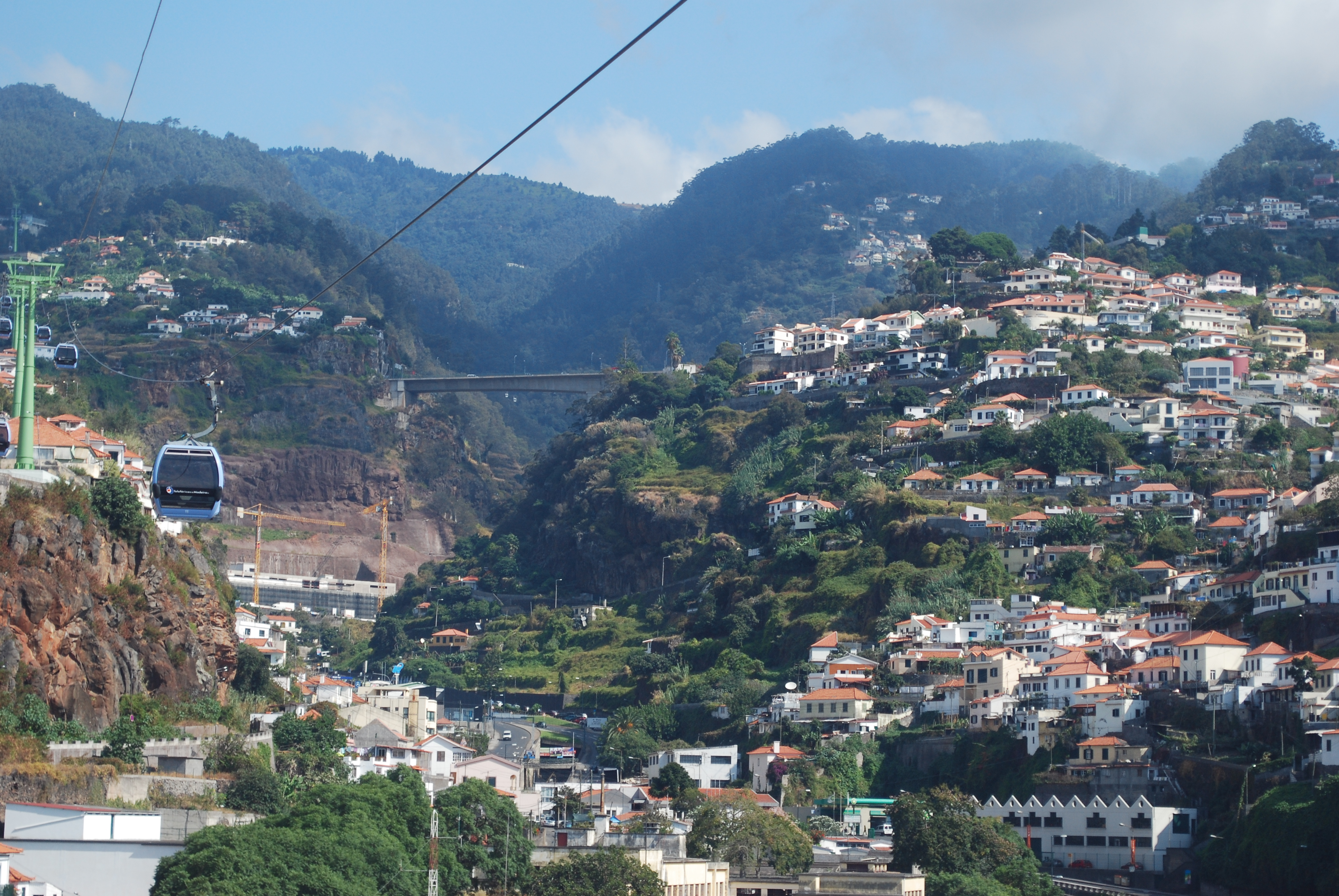
A view of the western limits of the parish, from the Monte cable car

The parish is best described as a similar in form to a "number six" located north of São Pedro, in the urbanized beltway of Funcal. Its limits are delineated in the west by a long strip that includes the Rua da Torrinha (and the older Caminho de Ferro), Estrada do Monte (São Roque) and the ravine of Ribeira de Santa Luzia which flows through to the Atlantic, and a circular area enveloped by the bridge of Torreão (over the Ribeira de Santa Luzia) and east by the Rua da Levada and Estrada de Livramento.

The construction of the primary school EB2/3 Escola Básica de Bartolomeu Perestrelo (English: Barolomeu Perestrelo Primary School), with a capacity for 2000 students, has turned this parish into a new central place for Funchal, with the concentration of new residents in the community.
