= Santa Quitéria, Funchal =

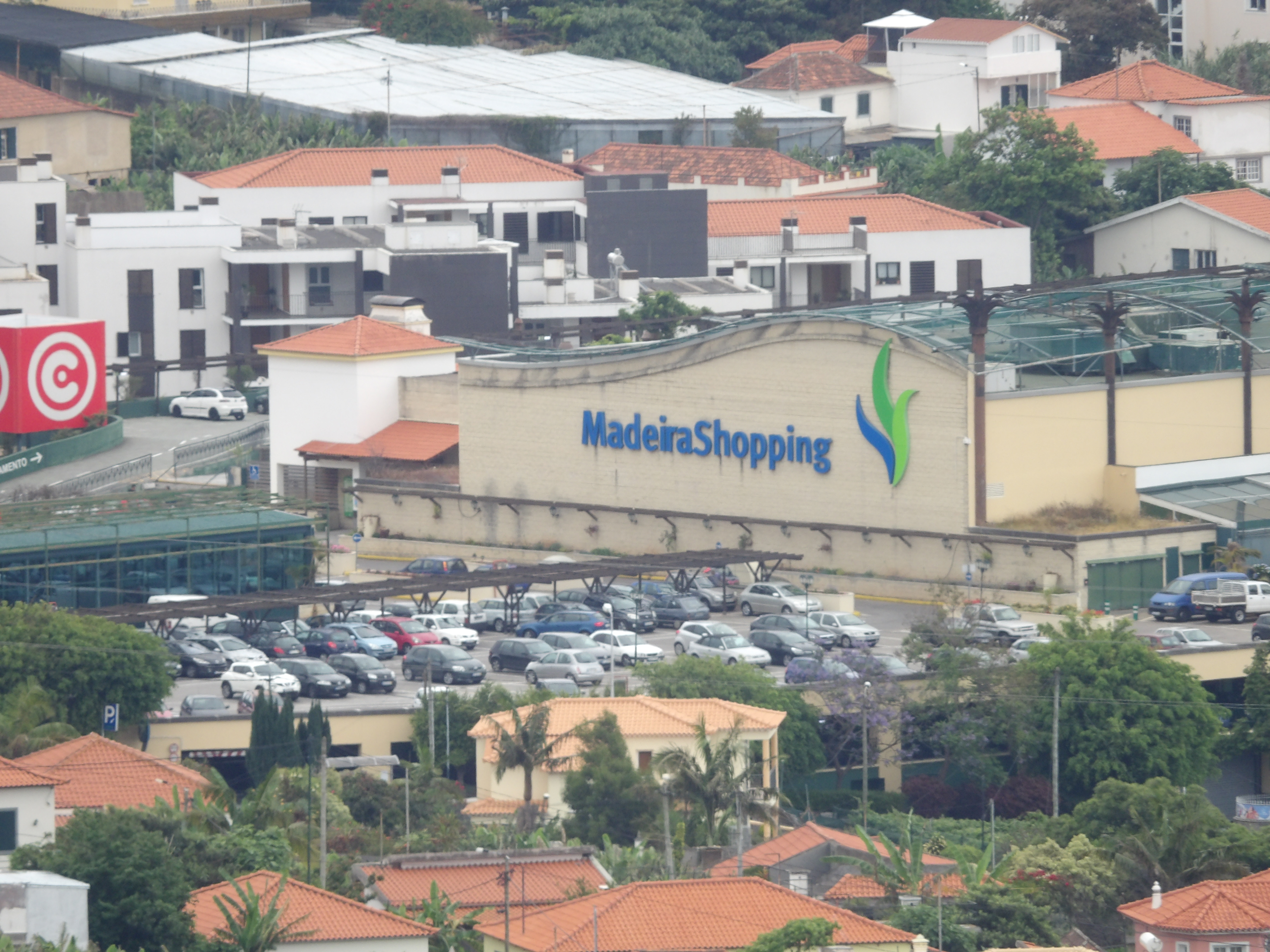
Madeira Shopping

Santa Quitéria, Funchal forms part of the parish of Santo António (Funchal) on the island of Madeira, named after Saint Quiteria. The area is home to the largest shopping centre on the island, Madeira Shopping, with 106 shops occupying an area of approximately 26,600 m2. It also has 1,060 parking spaces.

A levada called Levada do Curral de Castelege also flows through this area.
