= São Gonçalo (Funchal) =

- Civil parish
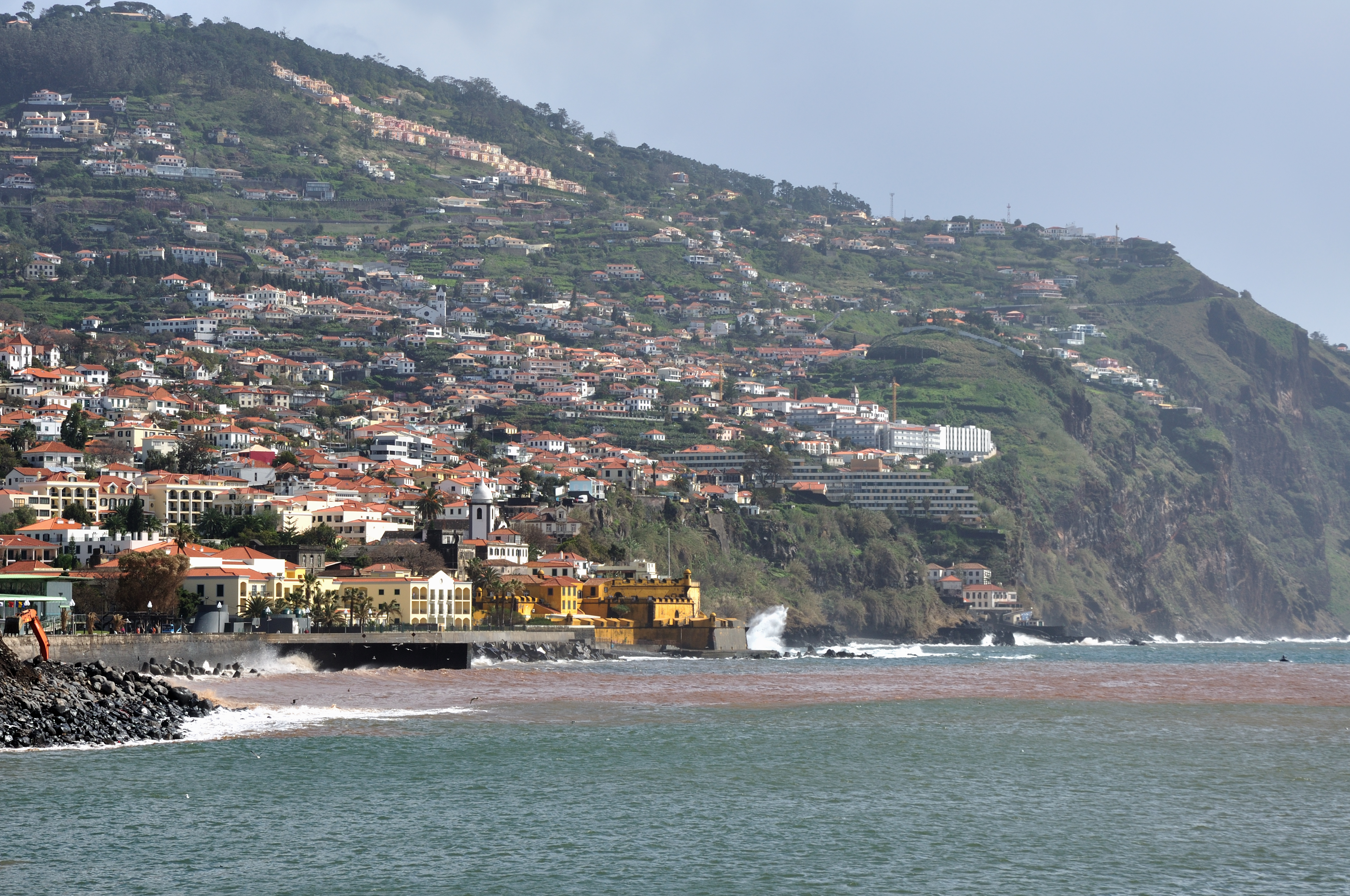
- The distant escarpment of São Gonçalo, as seen from the coastal area of Santa Maria Maior

- Location in Madeira
- Coordinates: 32°39′27″N 16°52′16″W
- Country: Portugal
- Auton. region: Madeira
- Island: Madeira
- Municipality: Funchal
- Established: c. 1574

Area
  - Total: 7.06 km^{2} (2.73 sq mi)
- Elevation: 516 m (1,693 ft)

Population (2011)
  - Total: 6,587
  - Density: 933/km^{2} (2,420/sq mi)
- Time zone: UTC+00:00 (WET)
  - Summer (DST): UTC+01:00 (WEST)
- Postal code: 9060-196
- Area code: 291
- Website: www.freguesiasaogoncalo.pt

São Gonçalo is a freguesia ("civil parish") parish in the municipality of Funchal, located near the south coast of the island of Madeira, in Portugal.

The population in 2011 was 6,587, in an area of 7.06 km².

== Geography ==
The São Gonçalo civil parish consists of the settlements Algarvio, Bica do Pau, Boa Nova, Cancela, Farrobo de Baixo, Fonte, Igreja, Lomba da Quinta, Neves, Palheiro Ferreiro, Piornais, Ribeiro da Qinta, Ribeiro Seco, Salões and São João Latrão.

It is located on the eastern border of Santa Cruz civil parish. São Gonçalo is linked by regional roads to Funchal to the west, to Machico, and to Porto da Cruz.

== History ==
The settlement of the area of São Gonçalo, much like the first lands cultivated on the island, progressed after the initial colonization by João Gonçalves Zarco. Gonçalo Aires Ferreira, one of the first settlers in this region, was a member of Zarco's fleet, and acquired land west of the primary settlement (that would become Funchal), encompassing the area between the right margin of Ribeiro Gonçalo Aires and Ribeira de Santa Luzia. The area became known as São Gonçalo for the fact that it was explored by Gonçalo Aires Ferreira, under the direction of Gonçalo Zarco, and not specifically for the Saints with the same name. The ravine physically divided the Gonçalo Aires Ferreira's lands at the mouth of the Ribeiro Lazareto, cutting it from the ecclesiastical parish of Santa Maria Maior.

Jerónimo Dias Leite later identified the first children born on Madeira, as the children of Gonçalo Aires, who were named Adam and Eve: a reflection of the regliosity of these first settlers, who saw the newly discovered lands as a new Paradise. Further, the profound religious inclination of the period was characterised by construction of small chapels alongside the homes of many of the first nobility to settle along the coast.

As the religious orders divided the newly baptized community of Funchal into two ecclesiastical parishes (Sé and Santa Maria Maior), the region of São Gonçalo continued as the enclave within the latter. The faithful concentrated their religious devotion at the Church of Nossa Senhora do Calhau, while new nuclei developing throughout the 15th century. Some services occurred in a small chapel within the enclave, which was located in a peak that became known as Pico do Lopo Machado, and whose landowner lived in the zone: Ermitério das Neves.

== See also ==
- Parishes of Funchal
