= Arega =

- Civil parish
- Location in Portugal
- Coordinates: 39.847°N 8.318°W
- Country: Portugal
- Region: Centro
- Intermunic. comm.: Região de Leiria
- District: Leiria
- Municipality: Figueiró dos Vinhos

Area
  - Total: 28.64 km^{2} (11.06 sq mi)

Population (2011)
  - Total: 870
  - Density: 30/km^{2} (79/sq mi)
- Time zone: UTC+00:00 (WET)
  - Summer (DST): UTC+01:00 (WEST)

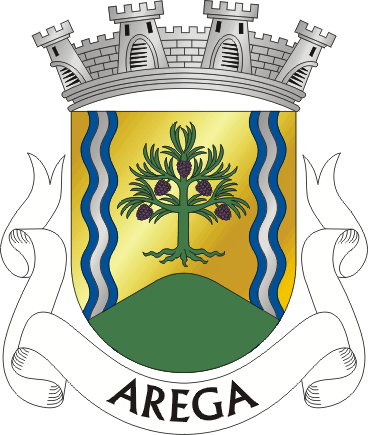

Arega is a civil parish in the municipality of Figueiró dos Vinhos in Leiria District, Portugal. The population in 2011 was 870, in an area of 28.64 km^{2}.
