= Santa Luzia (Funchal) =

- Civil parish
- Location in Madeira
- Coordinates: 32°39′30″N 16°54′16″W
- Country: Portugal
- Auton. region: Madeira
- Island: Madeira
- Municipality: Funchal

Area
  - Total: 1.34 km^{2} (0.52 sq mi)
- Elevation: 144 m (472 ft)

Population (2011)
  - Total: 5,866
  - Density: 4,380/km^{2} (11,300/sq mi)
- Time zone: UTC+00:00 (WET)
  - Summer (DST): UTC+01:00 (WEST)
- Postal code: 9050-023
- Area code: 291
- Patron: Santa Luzia
- Website: www.jf-santaluzia.pt

Santa Luzia (Portuguese meaning Saint Lucy) is a parish in the municipality of Funchal in the Madeira Islands. The population in 2011 was 5,866, in an area of 1.34 km^{2}.

== History ==
Santa Luzia is one of the four urban parishes of Funchal, which, along with Sé, São Pedro and Imaculado Coração de Maria, developed from the concentration of the first settlers to the southern coast. The parish grew out of necessity, since congestion in the parish of Sé had already limited available lands along the coast. The civil parish's name was a consequence of the older parish of Santa Luzia, but created from the dissection of lands in Sé and Nossa Senhora do Monte.

== Geography ==
Santa Luzia is boxed in by the Ribeira of João Gomes (whose origin is in the Serra do Poiso in the interior), in the east, and on the west by Ribeira de Santa Luzia (which springs from the area around the Pico do Areeiro and Pico do Escalvado, and is responsible for the volume of spring run-off that flows into the Ribeiro de Cideral, Ribeira dos Frades, Ribeira do Pisão an Ribeira do Til.
