= Ferreira do Zêzere =

- Municipality
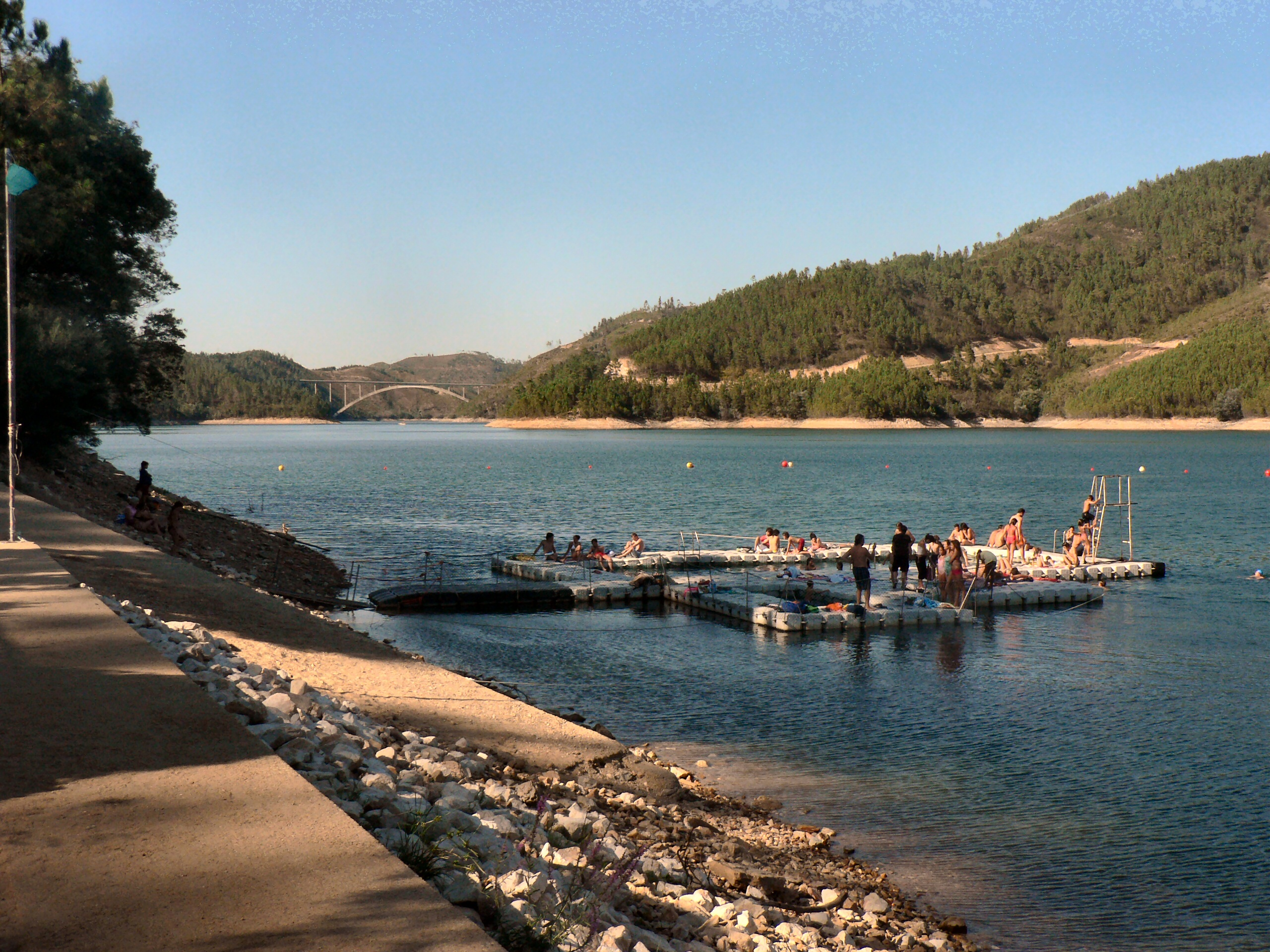
- View of Ferreira do Zêzere

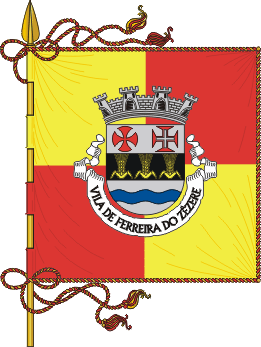
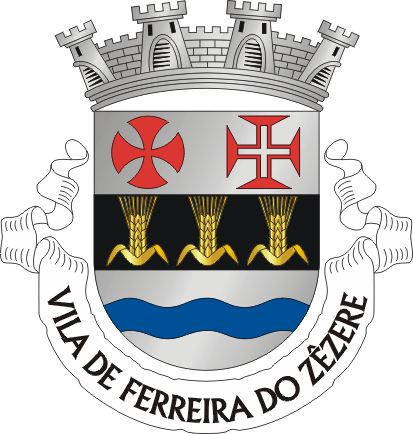
- Flag Coat of arms
- Interactive map of Ferreira do Zêzere
- Location in Portugal
- Coordinates: 39°41′N 8°17′W
- Country: Portugal
- Region: Oeste e Vale do Tejo
- Intermunic. comm.: Médio Tejo
- District: Santarém
- Parishes: 7

Government
  - President: Bruno Gomes (PS)

Area
  - Total: 190.38 km^{2} (73.51 sq mi)

Population (2011)
  - Total: 8,619
  - Density: 45.27/km^{2} (117.3/sq mi)
- Time zone: UTC+00:00 (WET)
  - Summer (DST): UTC+01:00 (WEST)
- Local holiday: Saint Anthony; June 13
- Website: www.cm-ferreiradozezere.pt

Ferreira do Zêzere (pronounced [fɨˈʁɐjɾɐ ðu ˈzezɨɾɨ], locally [fɨˈreɾɐ -]) is a Portuguese municipality in the historical Ribatejo Portuguese province and in Santarém District. The population in 2011 was 8,619, in an area of 190.38 km^{2}. The municipal holiday is June 13.

== Parishes ==
Administratively, the municipality is divided into 7 civil parishes (freguesias):

- Águas Belas
- Areias e Pias
- Beco
- Chãos
- Ferreira do Zêzere
- Igreja Nova do Sobral
- Nossa Senhora do Pranto

== History ==
Ferreira do Zêzere, founded by Pedro Ferreira and his wife in the 13th century, is said to be one of the most-visited villages in the district of Santarém. In the surroundings of the village there is the medieval Vila de Dornes with a view over the Zêzere River and classed as a Templar tower.

In January 2026, Storm Kristin caused a catastrophic amount of damage in the municipality of Ferreira do Zêzere. Between 4,000 and 5,000 homes and a majority of the buildings were damaged.
