= São Martinho (Funchal) =

- Civil parish
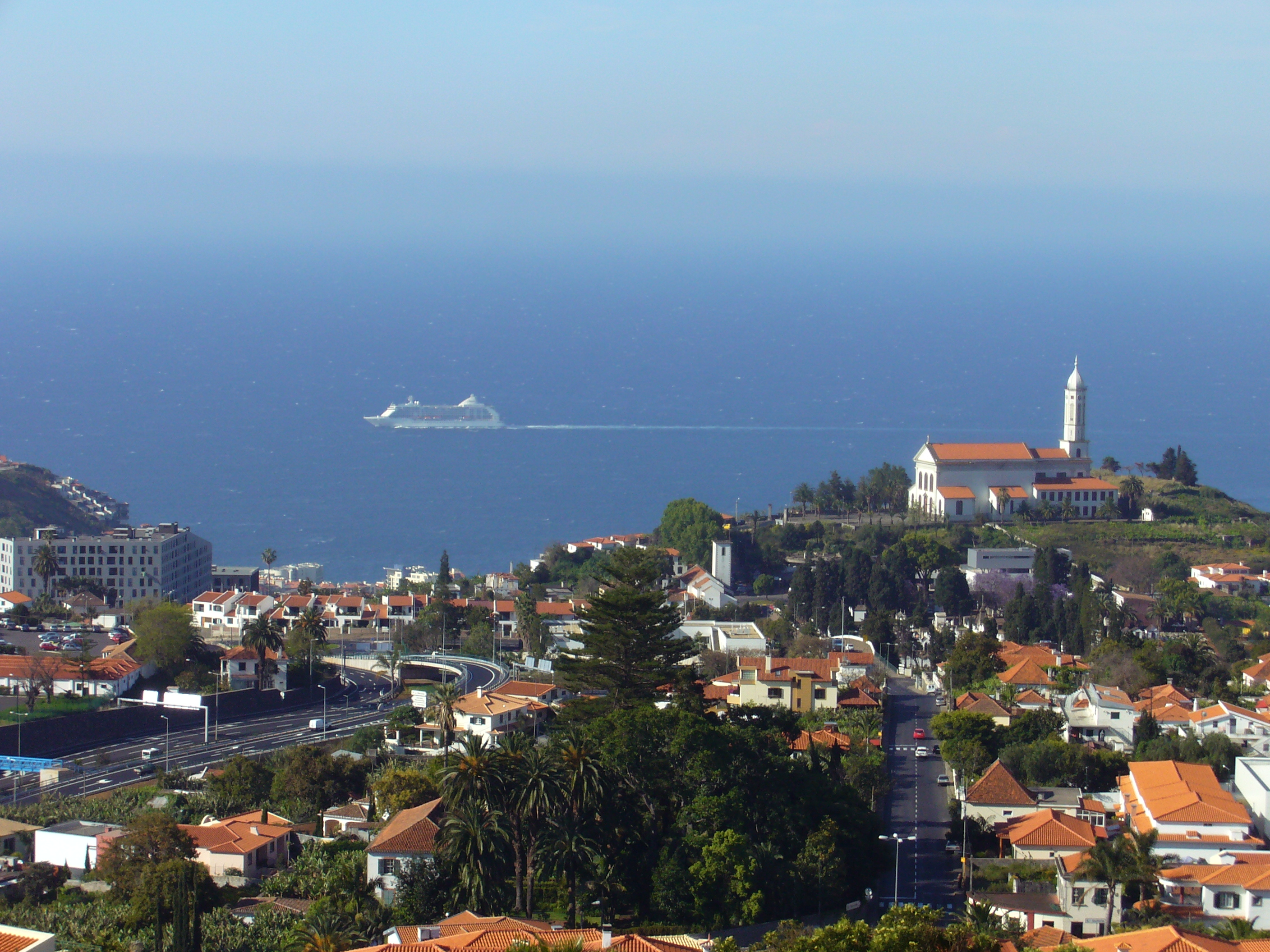
- São Martinho Church and the hilltops overlooking the southern coast of Madeira

- Location in Madeira
- Coordinates: 32°38′34″N 16°56′22″W
- Country: Portugal
- Auton. region: Madeira
- Island: Madeira
- Municipality: Funchal
- Established: Parish: 3 March 1579; Civil parish: 23 June 1916

Area
  - Total: 7.95 km^{2} (3.07 sq mi)
- Elevation: 239 m (784 ft)

Population (2011)
  - Total: 26,482
  - Density: 3,330/km^{2} (8,630/sq mi)
- Time zone: UTC+00:00 (WET)
  - Summer (DST): UTC+01:00 (WEST)
- Postal code: 9000-273
- Area code: 291
- Patron: Martin of Tours
- Website: jf-saomartinho.pt

São Martinho (English: Saint Martin) is a civil parish in the municipality of Funchal, on the island of Madeira. The population in 2011 was 26,482, in an area of 7.95 km².

== History ==
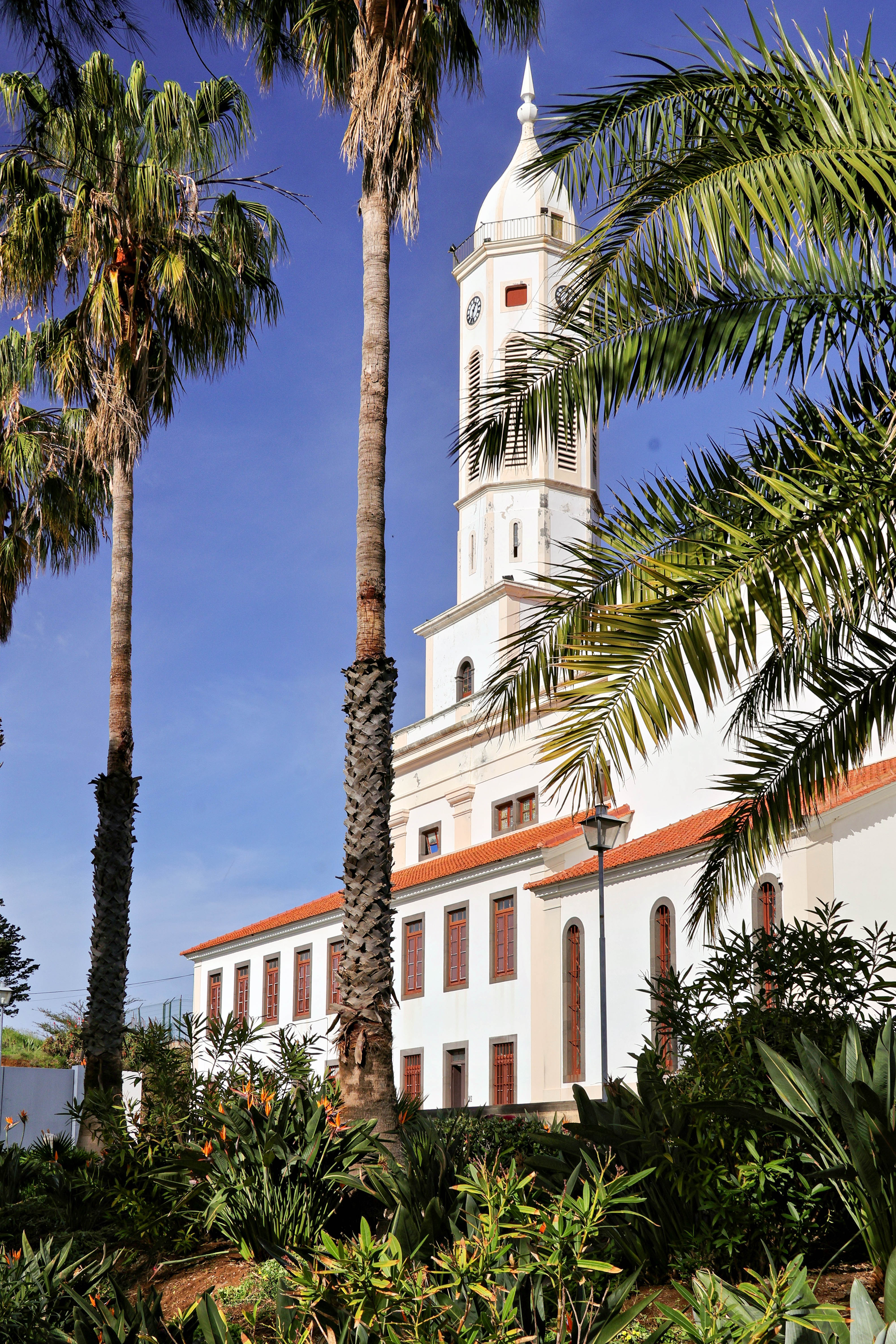
The Church of São Martinho (Igreja de São Martinho in Portuguese)

During the island's early settlement, the area that includes the present parish was part of the much large Sé, and later São Pedro, when it was finally deannexed in 1597. The lands immediately around the commercial centre of Funchal were quickly acquired and put into service for cultivation of subsistence crops. As with the other settlements in the Portuguese Empire, these settlements eventually formed from communities of living in the shadow of small chapels that dotted the landscape. The same was true for São Martinho: a small artesanal business and chapel constituted the first buildings in this region, owned by Afonso Anes, who was responsible for guiding the influencing development, becoming a parish on 3 March 1579. Much later a new church was a formal church constructed, by the 19th century.

The establishment of an Administrative Code in 1878, defined the creation of a level of government below the municipality, giving rise to the civil parish system that coincided with the older ecclesiastical parishes. On 23 June 1916, by decree law 621, the parish of São Martinho was created.

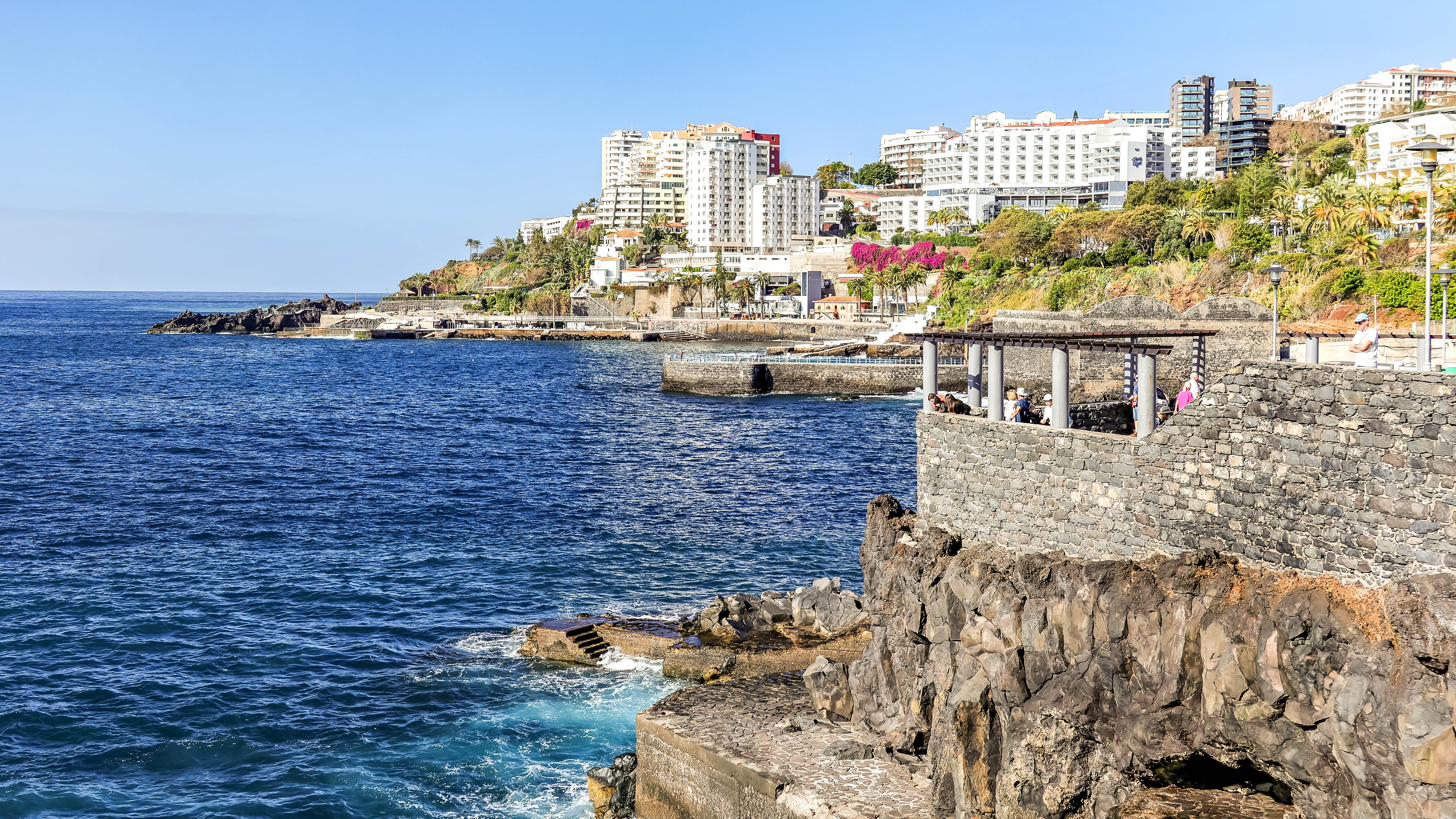
São Martinho from the sea side

== Geography ==
The parish covers the southwestern part of Funchal, located three to four kilometres west of Funchal and approximately three kilometres east of Câmara de Lobos. It consists of the localities Ajuda, Amparo, Areeiro, Casa Branca, Igreja, Lombada, Nazaré, Pico de São Martinho, Pico do Funcho, Pilar, Piornais, Poço Barral, Quebradas, Vargem, Virtudes and Vitória.
