= Santo António (Funchal) =

- Civil parish
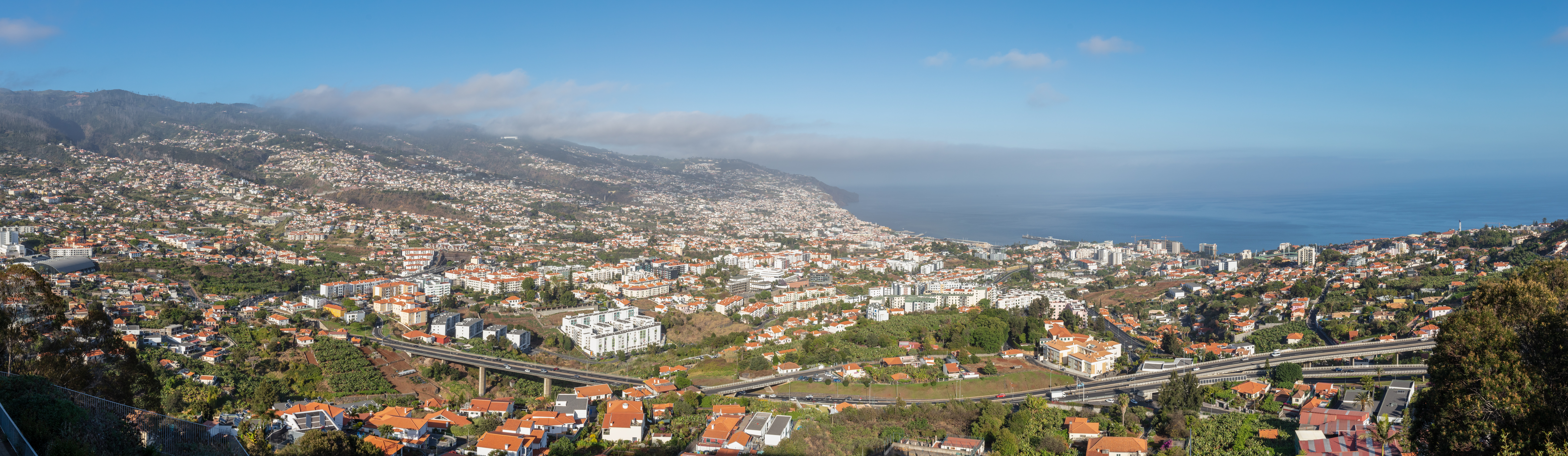
- A view of Funchal from Pico dos Barcelos

- Location in Madeira
- Coordinates: 32°41′29″N 16°56′43″W
- Country: Portugal
- Auton. region: Madeira
- Island: Madeira
- Municipality: Funchal
- Established: Settlement: fl. 1557; Parish: c. 1566

Area
  - Total: 22.16 km^{2} (8.56 sq mi)
- Elevation: 871 m (2,858 ft)

Population (2011)
  - Total: 27,383
  - Density: 1,236/km^{2} (3,200/sq mi)
- Time zone: UTC+00:00 (WET)
  - Summer (DST): UTC+01:00 (WEST)
- Postal code: 9020-117
- Area code: 291
- Patron: Santo António
- Website: www.jf-santoantonio.pt

Santo António (Portuguese meaning "Saint Anthony") is a civil parish in the northwestern part of the municipality of Funchal on the island of Madeira. It is located about 3 km northwest of central Funchal. The most populous civil parish in the archipelago, it extends into the mountainous interior of the island. The population in 2011 was 27,383, in an area of 22.16 km^{2}.

== History ==
The settlement that existed in this area was primarily small artisan shops, that congregated around a small chapel dedicated to Santo António, in the late 16th century, when it was elevated to ecclesiastical parish. It includes the barrio of Madalena, situated around a now disappeared chapel to Santa Maria Madalena, also Santa Quitéria which is home to Madeira Shopping, the biggest shopping centre on Madeira.

== Notable people ==
- Cristiano Ronaldo
