= Sé (Funchal) =

- Civil parish
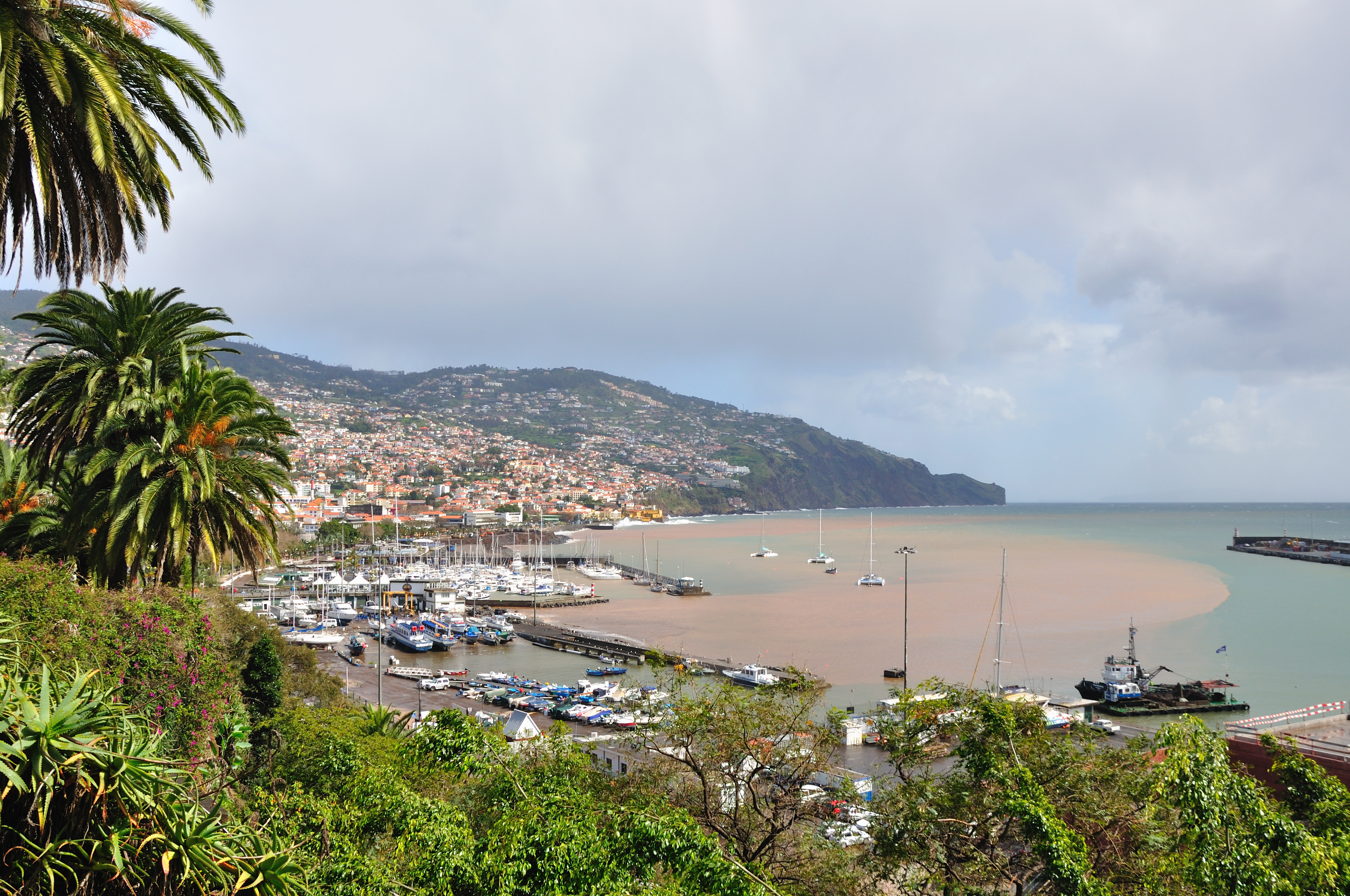
- Central Funchal in the parish of Sé, looking towards the marina

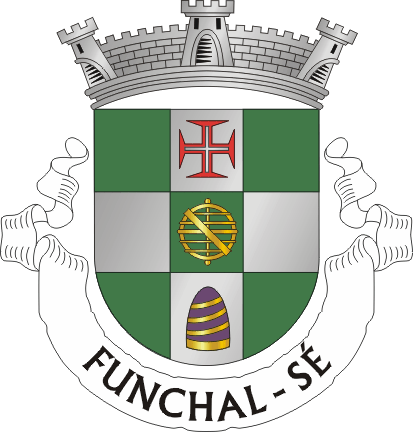
- Coat of arms

- Location in Madeira
- Coordinates: 32°38′46″N 16°54′51″W
- Country: Portugal
- Auton. region: Madeira
- Island: Madeira
- Municipality: Funchal
- Established: Settlement: c. 1415; Parish: c. 1514; Civil parish: c. 1566

Area
  - Total: 3.82 km^{2} (1.47 sq mi)
- Elevation: 34 m (112 ft)

Population (2011)
  - Total: 2,656
  - Density: 695/km^{2} (1,800/sq mi)
- Time zone: UTC+00:00 (WET)
  - Summer (DST): UTC+01:00 (WEST)
- Postal code: 9050-443
- Area code: 291

Sé (Portuguese for 'Episcopal see') is a civil parish in the municipality of Funchal, on the island of Madeira, Portugal. It includes the historical centre of Funchal. The population in 2011 was 2,656, in an area of 3.82 km^{2}. Its administrative authority includes the distant, uninhabited Savage Islands, with an area of 2.73 km^{2}.

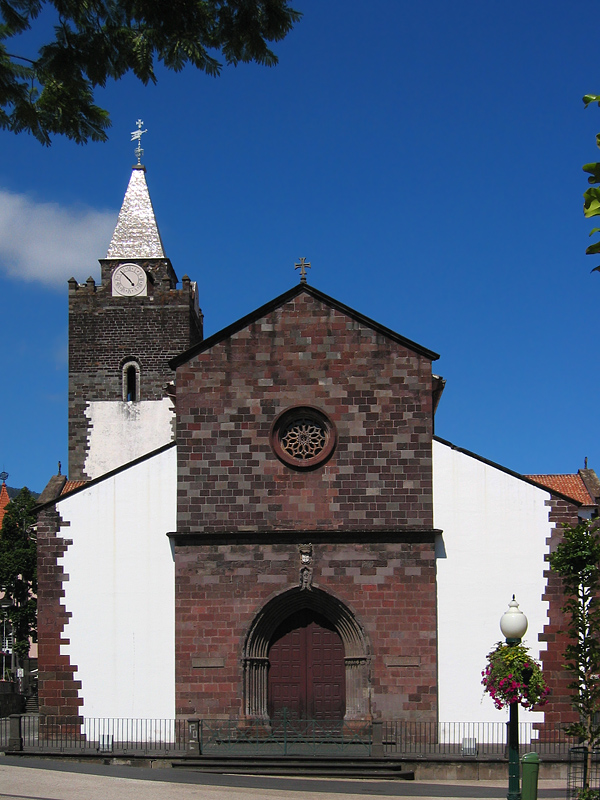
The Cathedral of Funchal, in the center of the Sé parish
