= Lavos (Figueira da Foz) =

- Civil parish
- Location in Portugal
- Coordinates: 40.094°N 8.829°W
- Country: Portugal
- Region: Centro
- Intermunic. comm.: Região de Coimbra
- District: Coimbra
- Municipality: Figueira da Foz

Area
  - Total: 42.02 km^{2} (16.22 sq mi)

Population (2011)
  - Total: 3,999
  - Density: 95.17/km^{2} (246.5/sq mi)
- Time zone: UTC+00:00 (WET)
  - Summer (DST): UTC+01:00 (WEST)

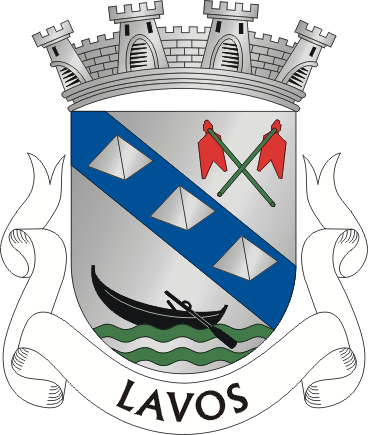
Lavos coat of arms

Lavos is a seaside parish in Figueira da Foz Municipality, Portugal. The population in 2011 was 3,999, in has an area of 42.02 km^{2} (16.22 sq mi).
