= Tavarede =

- Civil parish
- Location in Portugal
- Coordinates: 40.167°N 8.845°W
- Country: Portugal
- Region: Centro
- Intermunic. comm.: Região de Coimbra
- District: Coimbra
- Municipality: Figueira da Foz

Area
  - Total: 10.71 km^{2} (4.14 sq mi)

Population (2011)
  - Total: 9,441
  - Density: 880/km^{2} (2,300/sq mi)
- Time zone: UTC+00:00 (WET)
  - Summer (DST): UTC+01:00 (WEST)

Tavarede is a parish in the municipality of Figueira da Foz, Portugal. The population in 2011 was 9,441, in an area of 10.71 km^{2}.
