= Serra da Boa Viagem =

Mountain range in Portugal

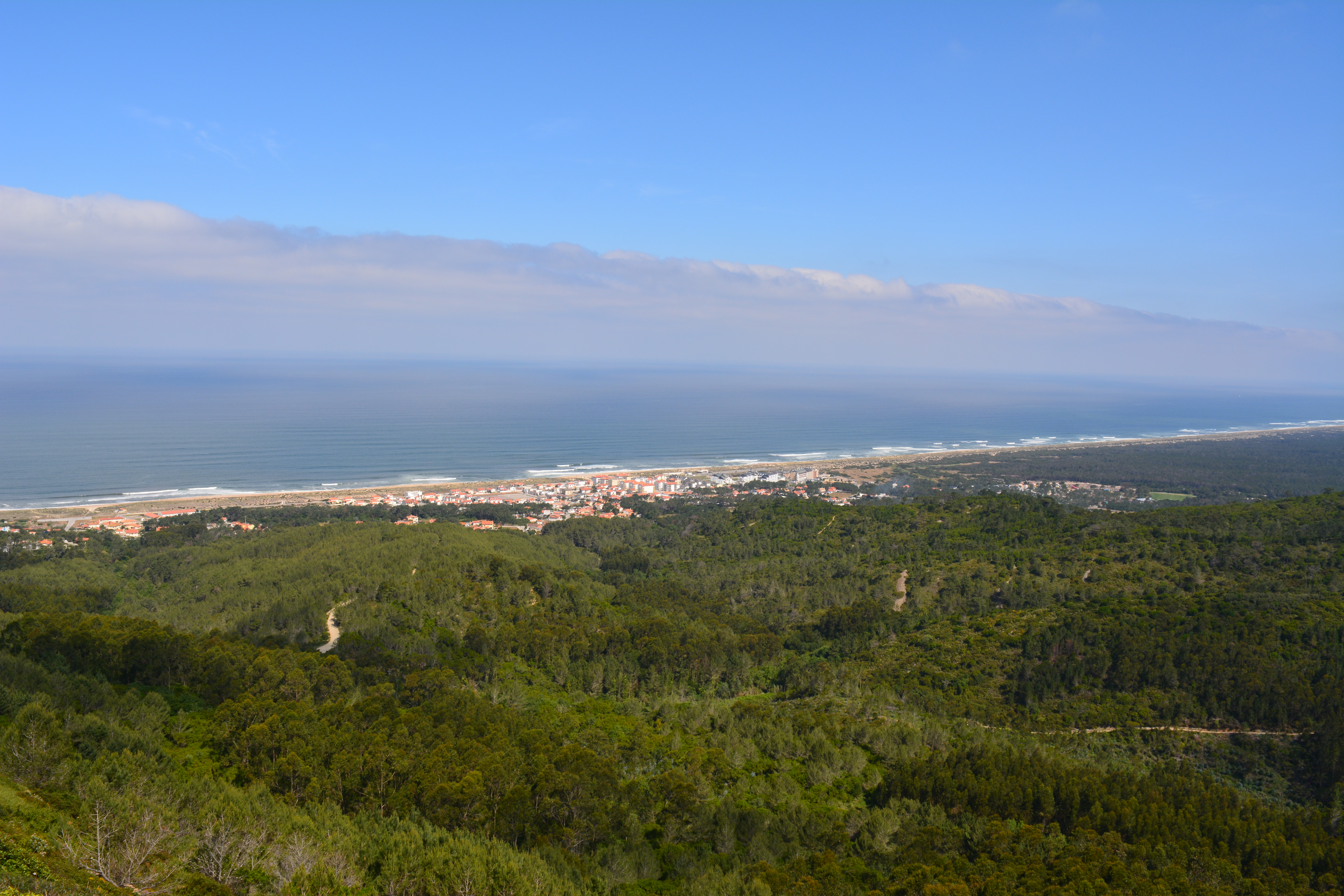

Highest point
- Elevation: 261.9 m (859 ft)
- Coordinates: 40°11′27″N 8°51′50″W

Geography
- Location within Portugal

Serra da Boa Viagem is a mountain range in Portugal, it lies three kilometers north of Figueira da Foz. The range goes up to 261.9 m (859 ft) in altitude. Around 83% of its area is between 150 and 250 m (490 and 820 ft) high. In its westernmost point lies Cabo Mondego.

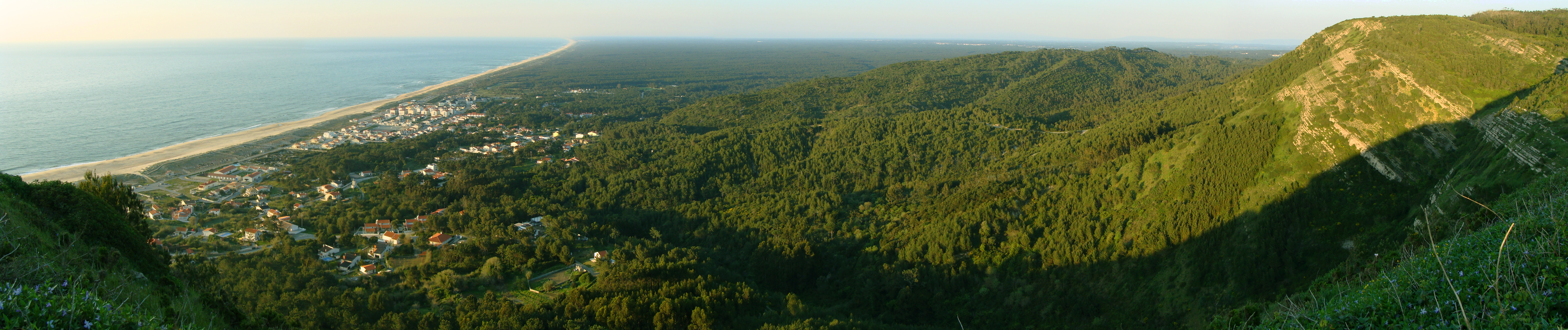
Serra da Boa Viagem and Quiaios beach
