= Cabo Mondego =

Cape in Portugal

Coordinates: 40°11′28″N 8°54′19″W

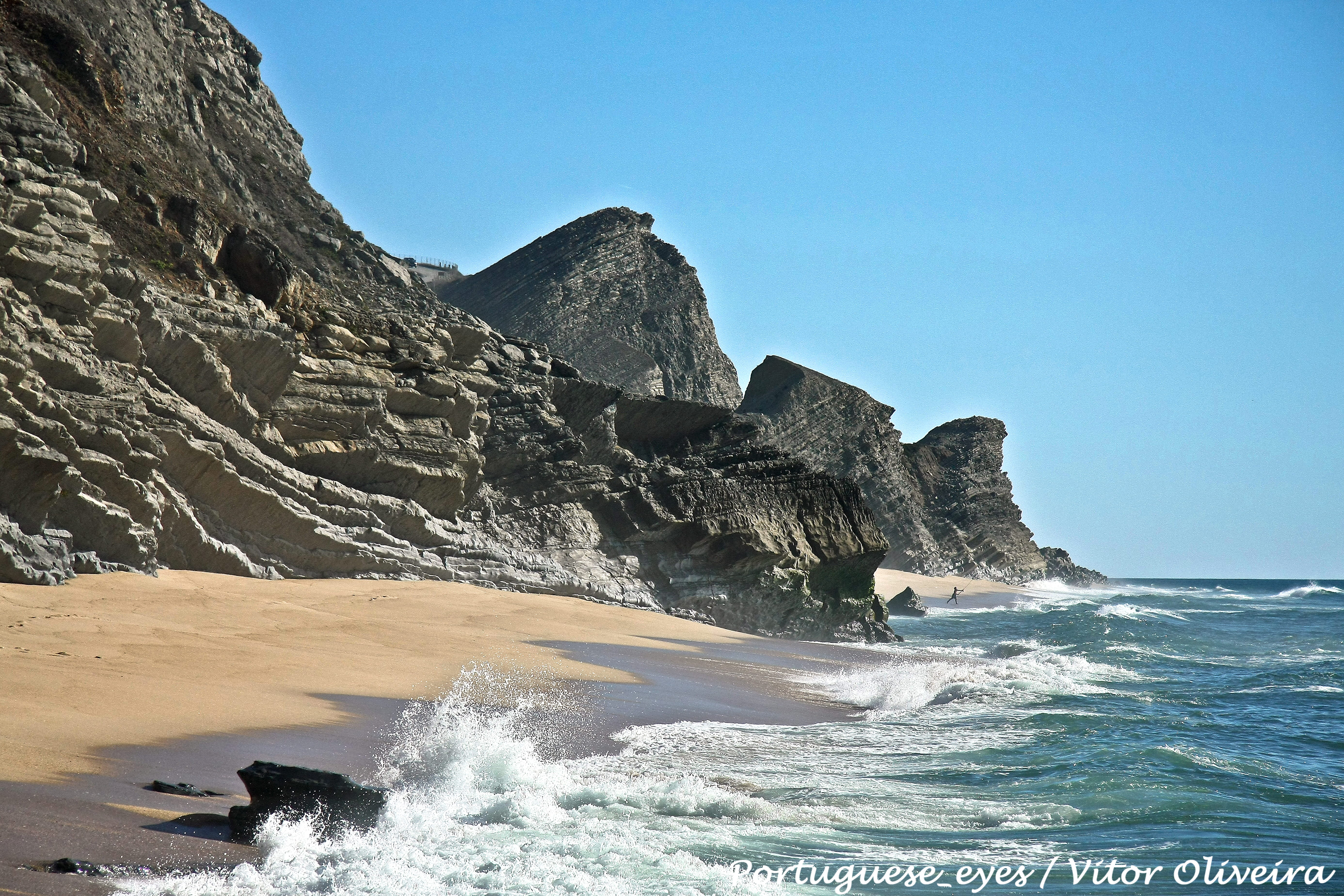
Geomorphology of the cape

Cabo Mondego is a cape located in central western Portugal bordering the Atlantic Ocean. It is the westernmost point of the Serra da Boa Viagem and is located three kilometers north of Figueira da Foz. It is classified as a natural monument since 2007. Multiple large theropod footprints are found in Cabo Mondego,they most range in size from 60–70 centimetres (24–28 in), with largest theropod footprint being a deformed,slippage induced track 92 centimetres (36 in) in length. The rocks these tracks are within are dated to the Oxfordian to Kimmeridgian of the Late Jurassic and the trackmakers were likely Torvosaurus.

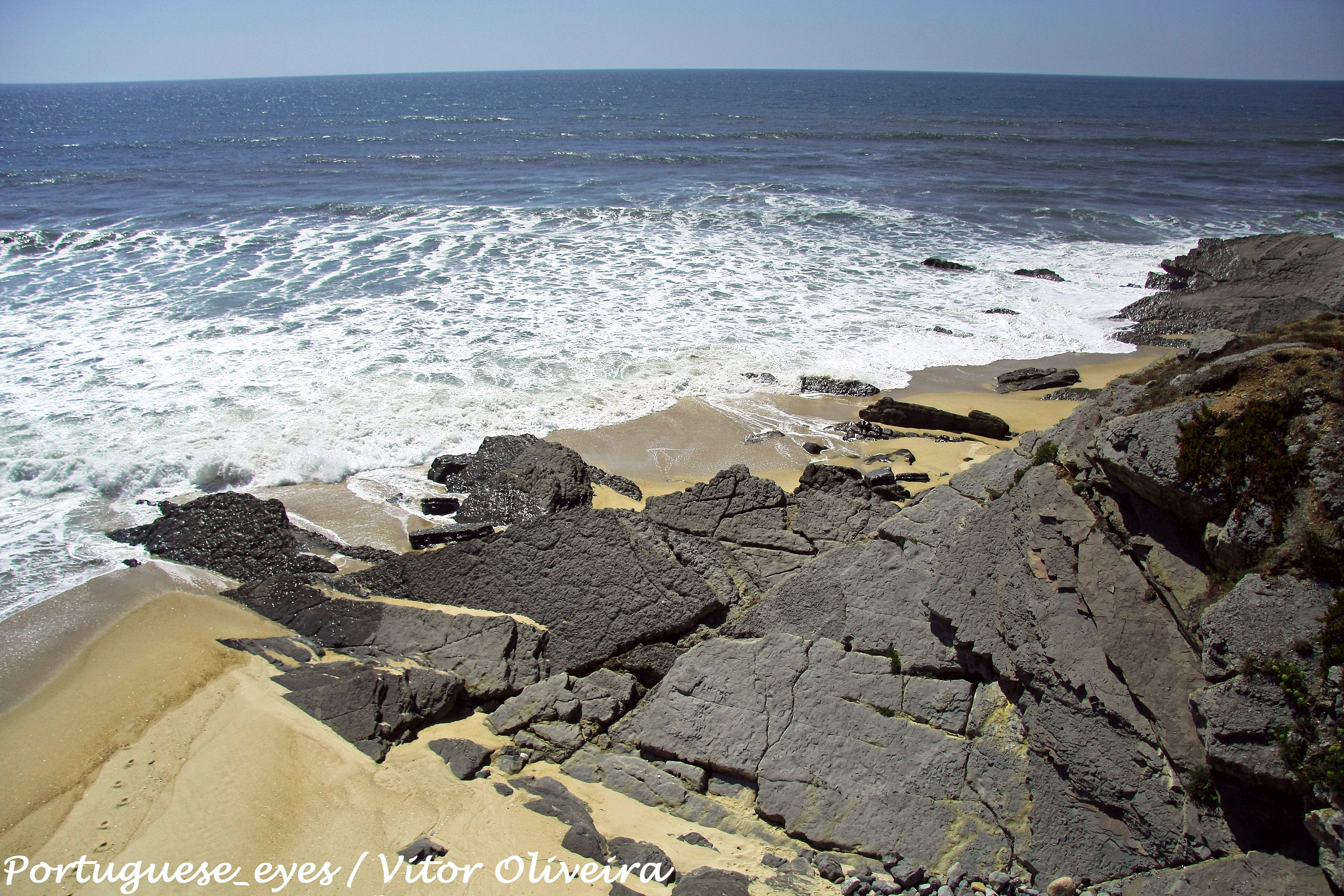

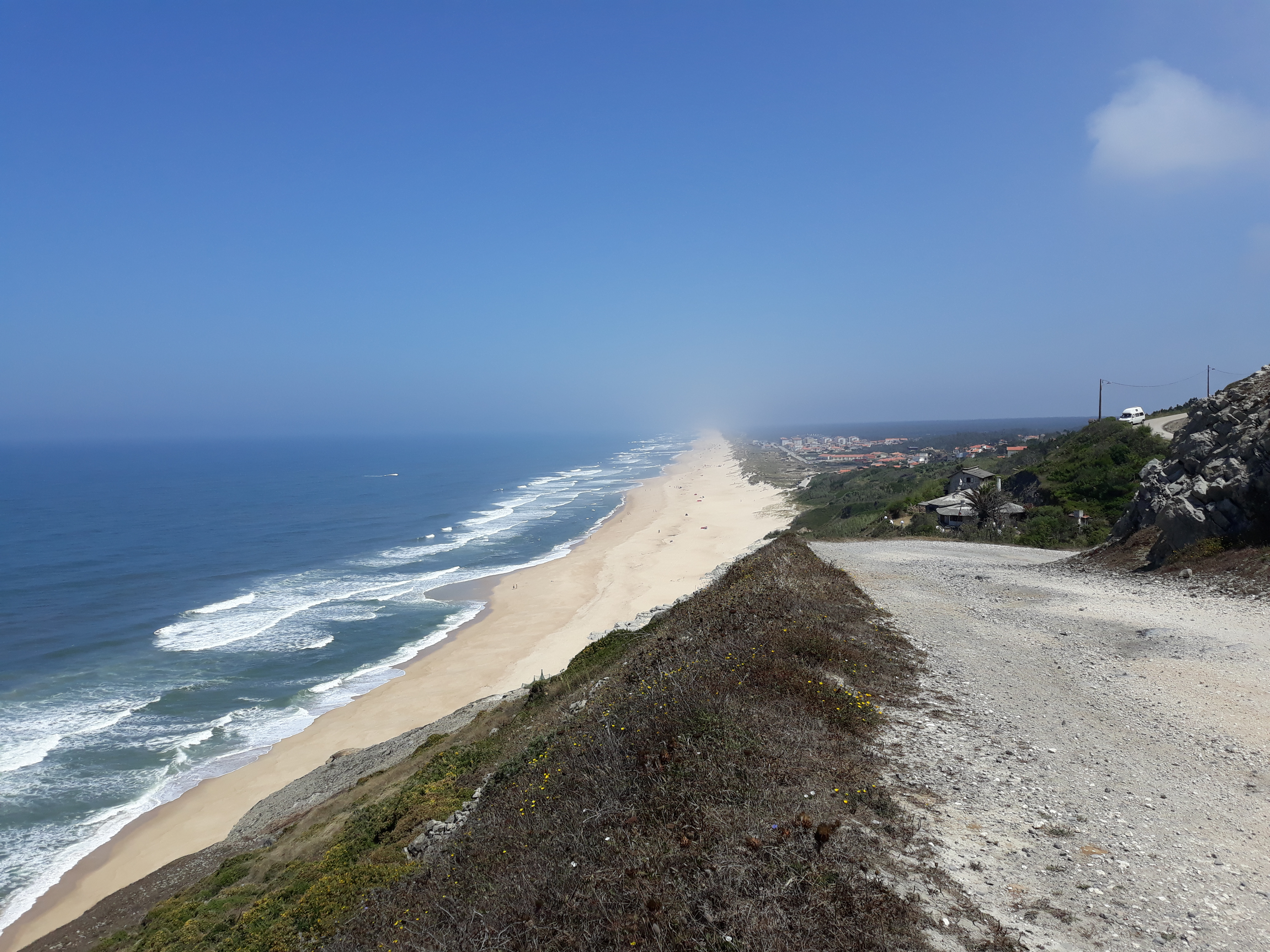

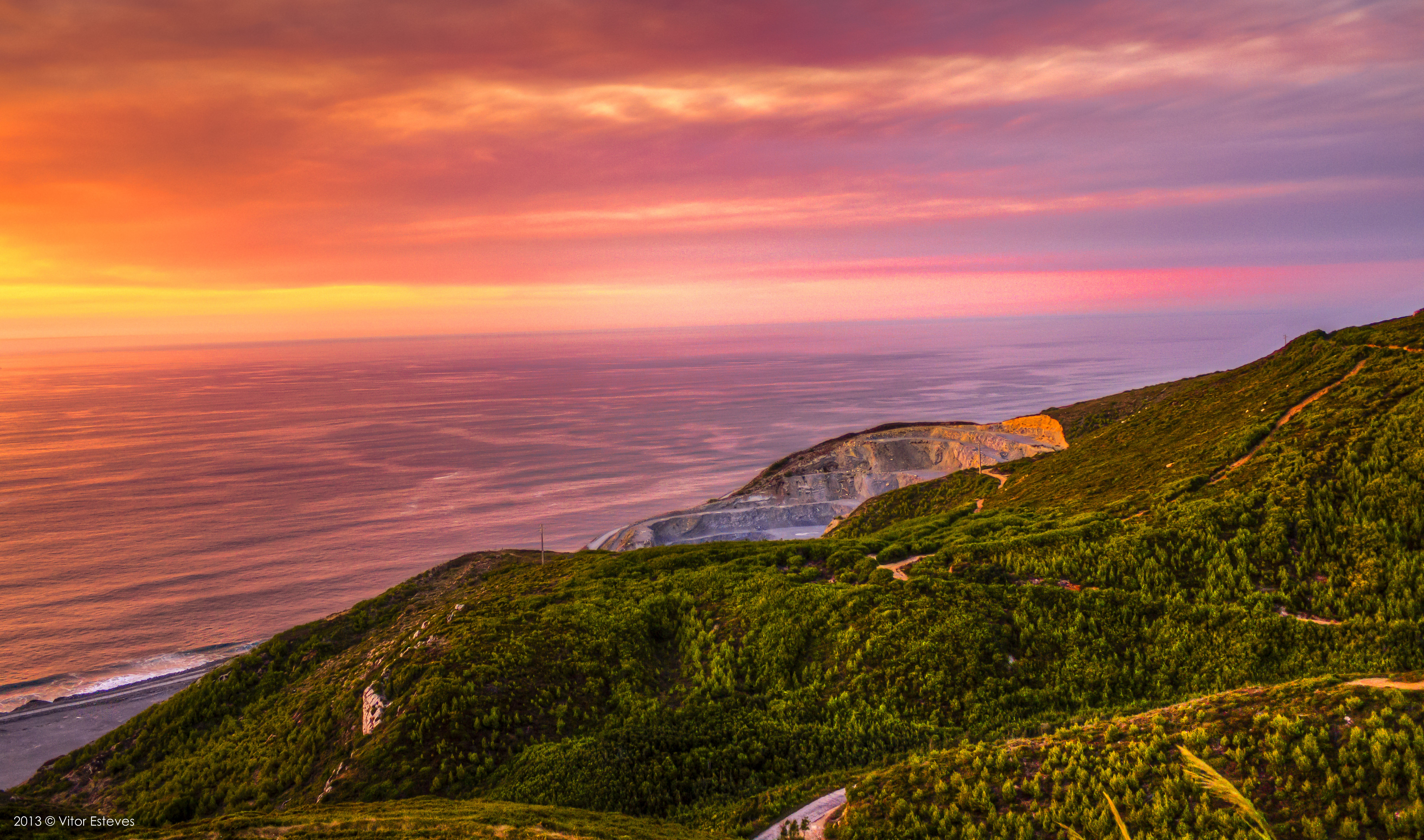

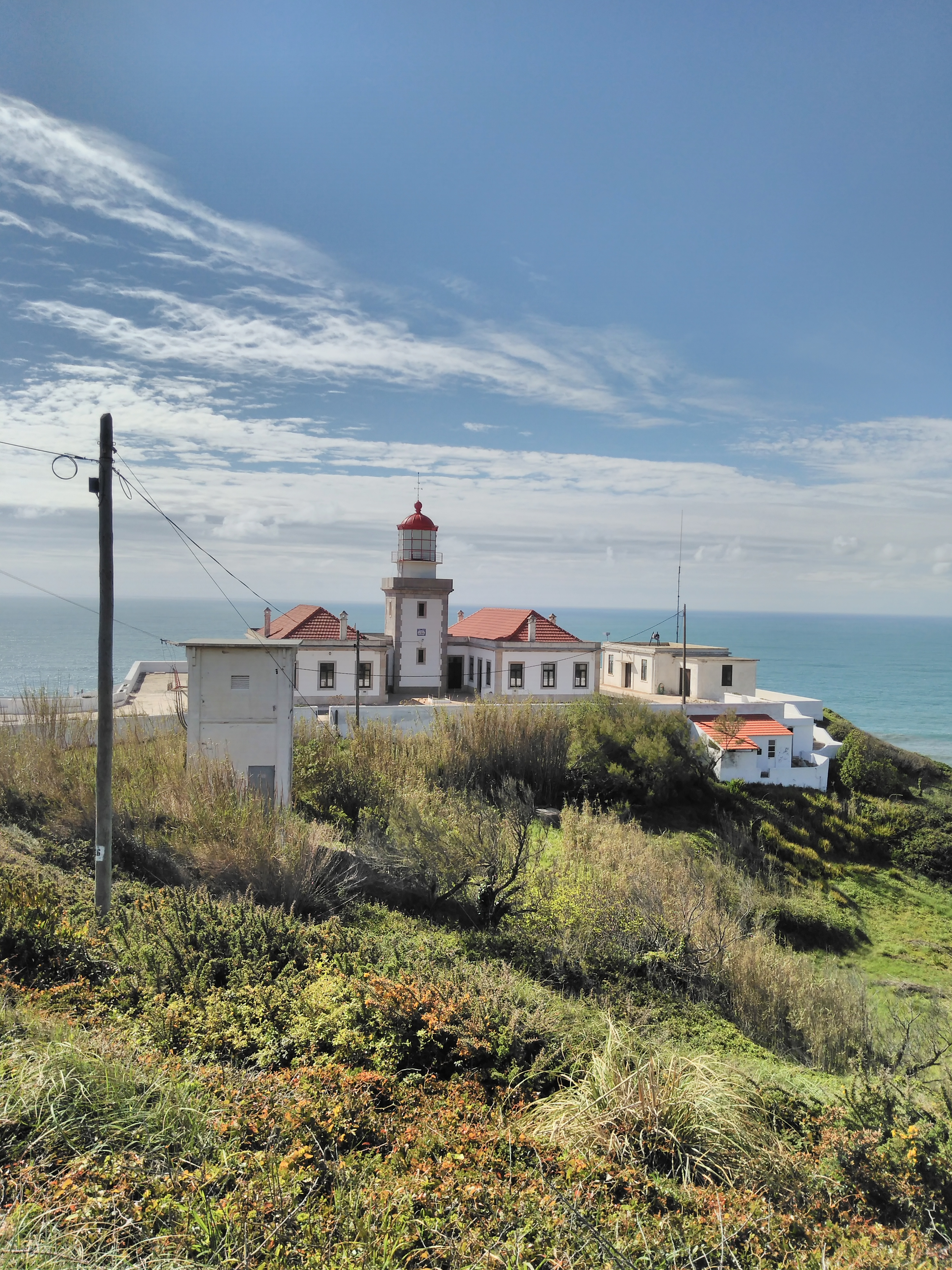
