= Marco Mendes =

Portuguese artist and comic author (born 1978)

Marco Mendes (born 1978) is a Portuguese artist and comic author. He has developed his main body of work around comics and illustration, mostly of biographical content. By the use of humor, incisive observation and nostalgia he has portrayed many of the young generation of Portuguese artists. His work also evolves around social and political issues. He currently lives in Porto, Portugal.

== Biography ==
Marco Mendes grew up in Figueira da Foz, Portugal. Revealing an early passion for art and an enthusiasm for painting and drawing, he moved to Porto by the age of 15, to pursue his art studies in Soares dos Reis High school. Later, he successfully entered the city's Faculty of Fine Arts, where he was influenced by other artists such as Eduardo Batarda and Álvaro Lapa. Inspired by the works of Robert Crumb, Harvey Pekar, Art Spiegelman, Adrian Tomine, Manuel João Vieira and Charles M. Schulz, among others, soon he started to draw comics.

== Published work ==
In 2004, he started the collective A Mula, together with Miguel Carneiro. Since then, they have organized multiple workshops, exhibitions, and published several fanzines. Their interest in alternative comics lead the publishing of Cospe Aqui, Paint Sucks, Lamb-Heart, Hum, Hum! Estou a Ver!..., and Estou Careca e a Minha Cadela Vai Morrer!

In June 2008, some of Mendes' work was published in English by Plana Press under the title Tomorrow the Chinese will Deliver the Pandas (ISBN 978-989-95807-1-8).

Diário Rasgado, his first graphic novel, was published by Mundo Fantasma in 2012. Anos Dourados, a compilation of observational drawings (mostly portraits of friends) and comics, was released in 2013, by Mundo Fantasma and Colégio das Artes.
