= Figueira da Foz =

- Municipality
- City of Figueira da Foz
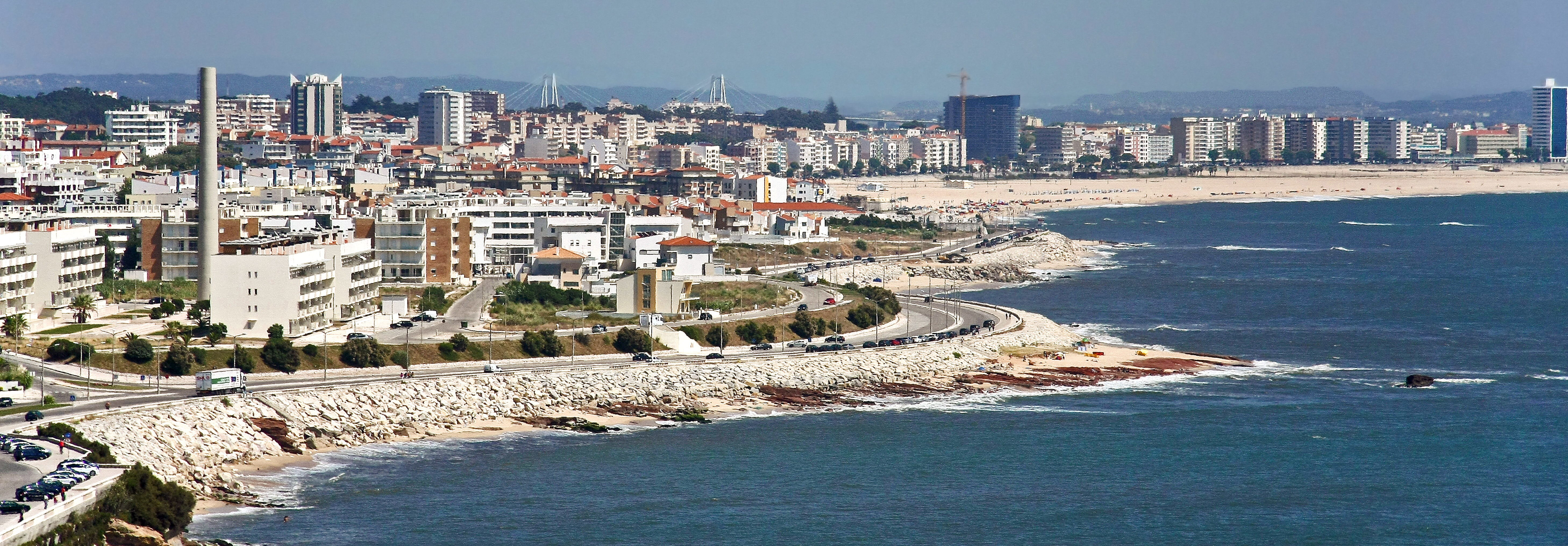
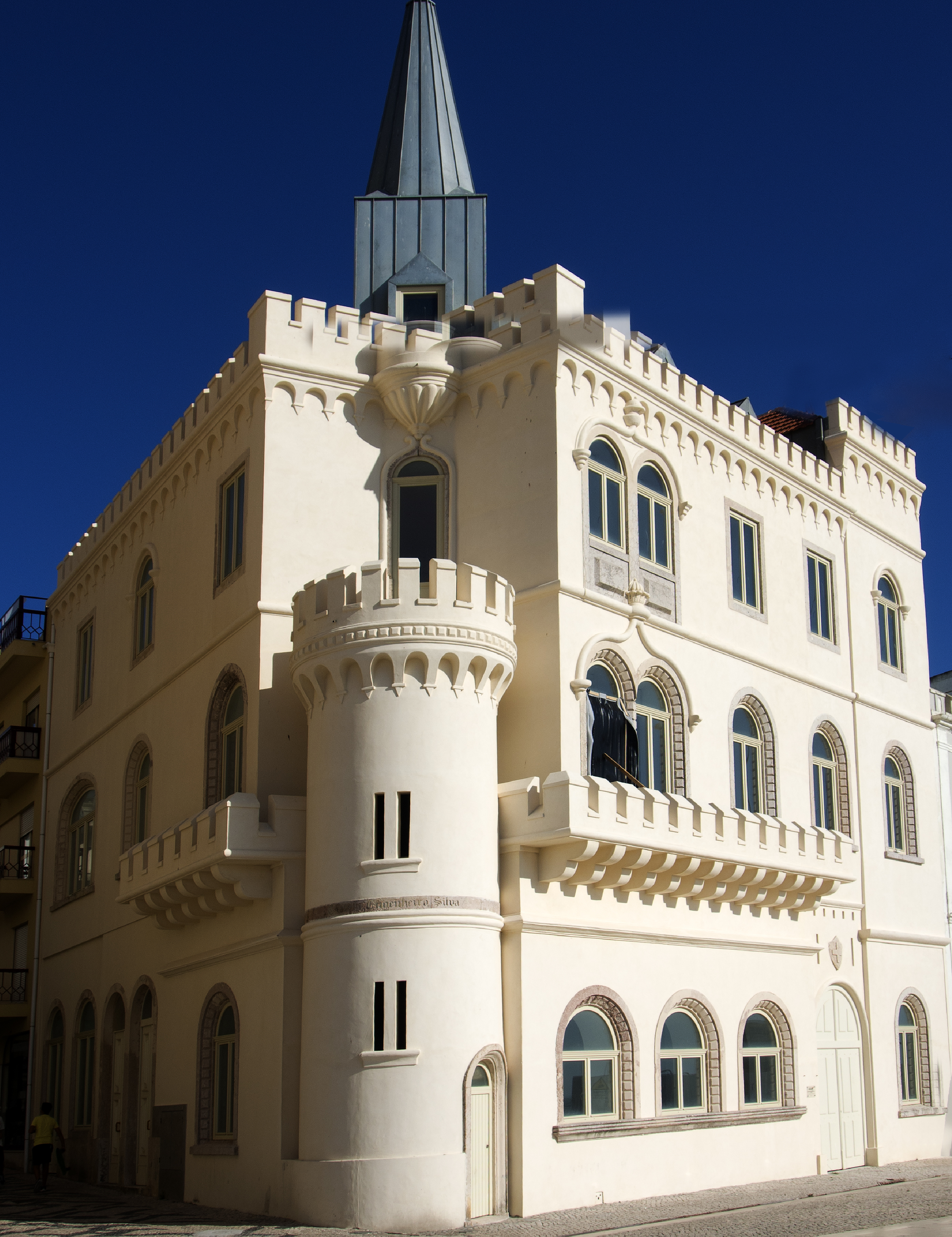
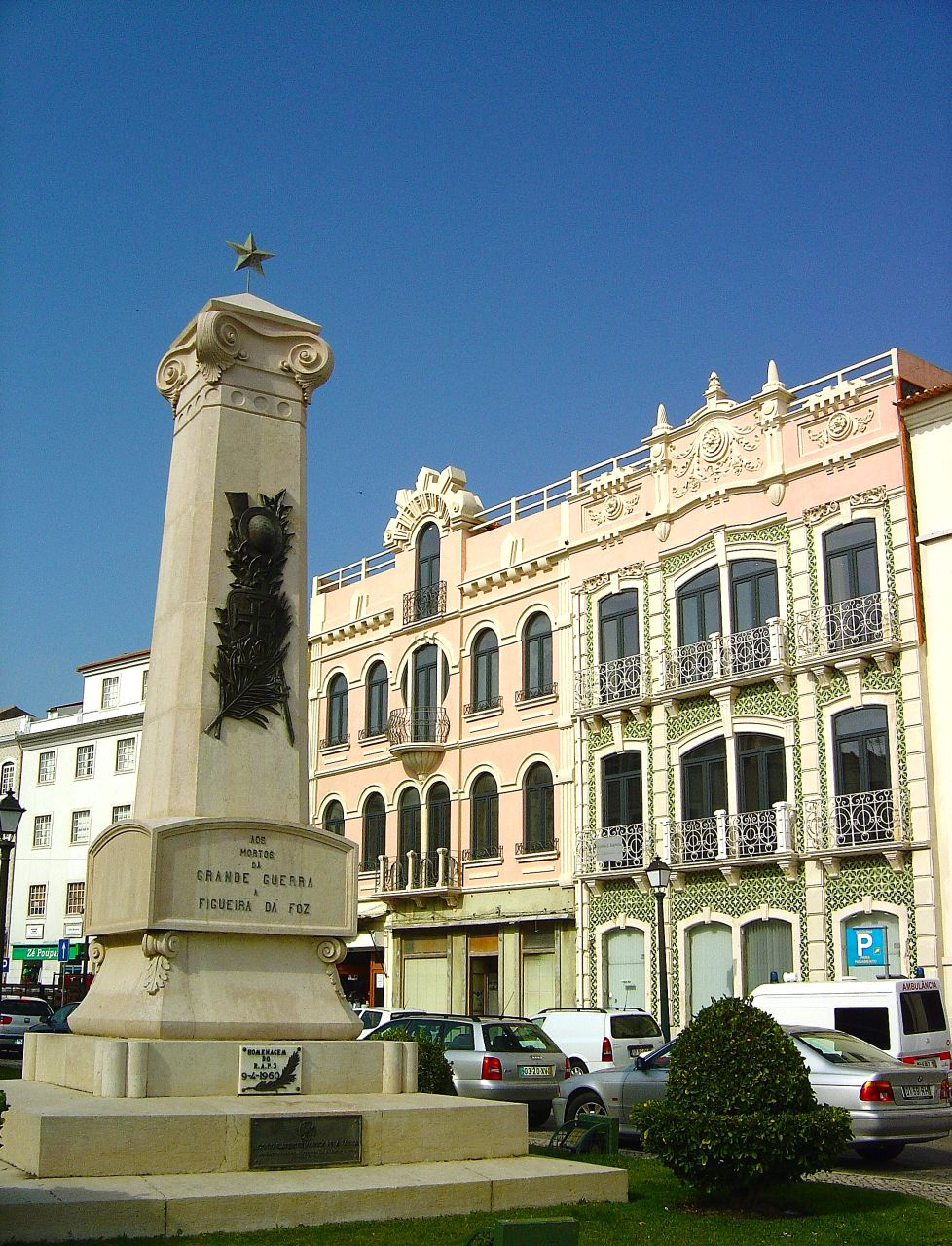
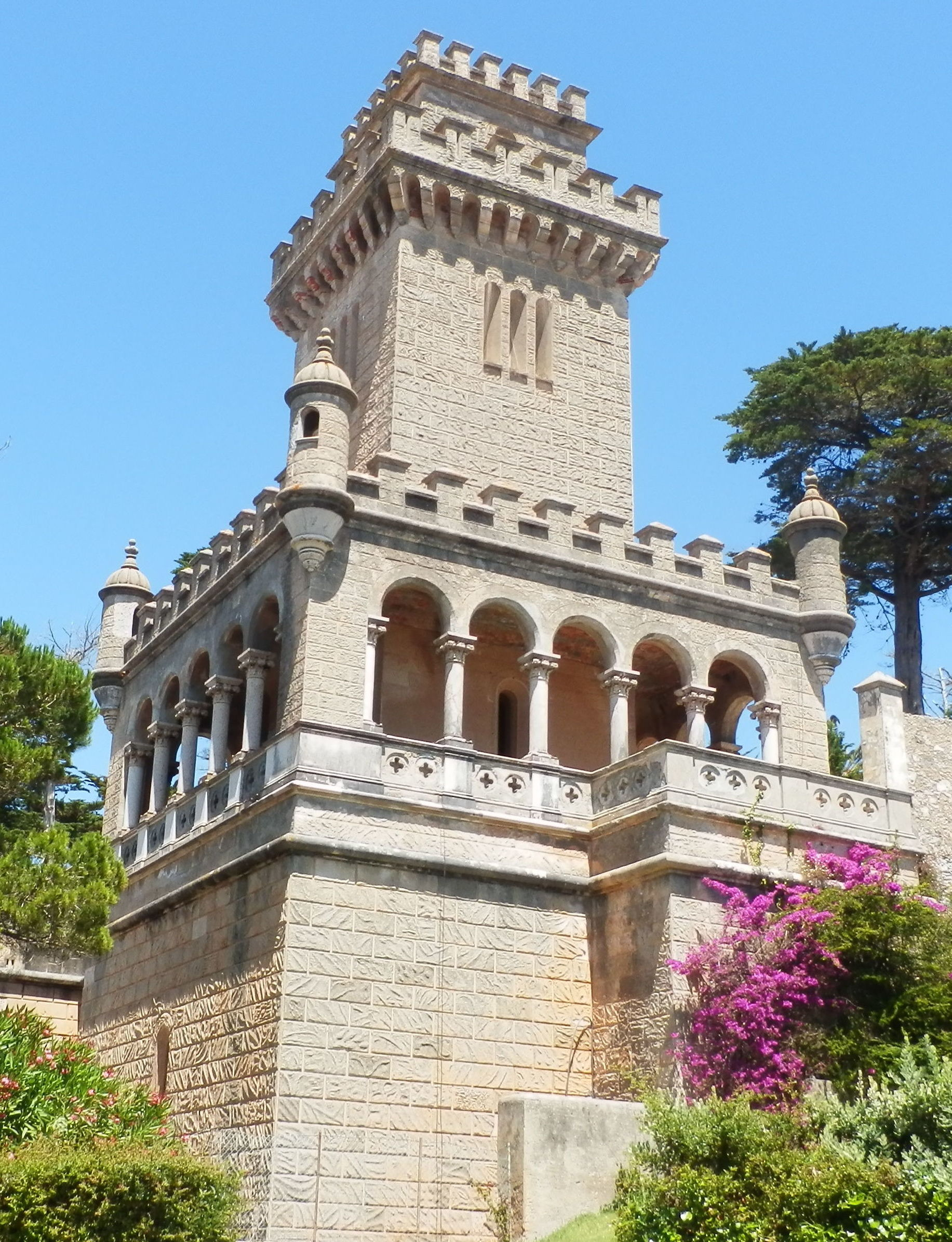
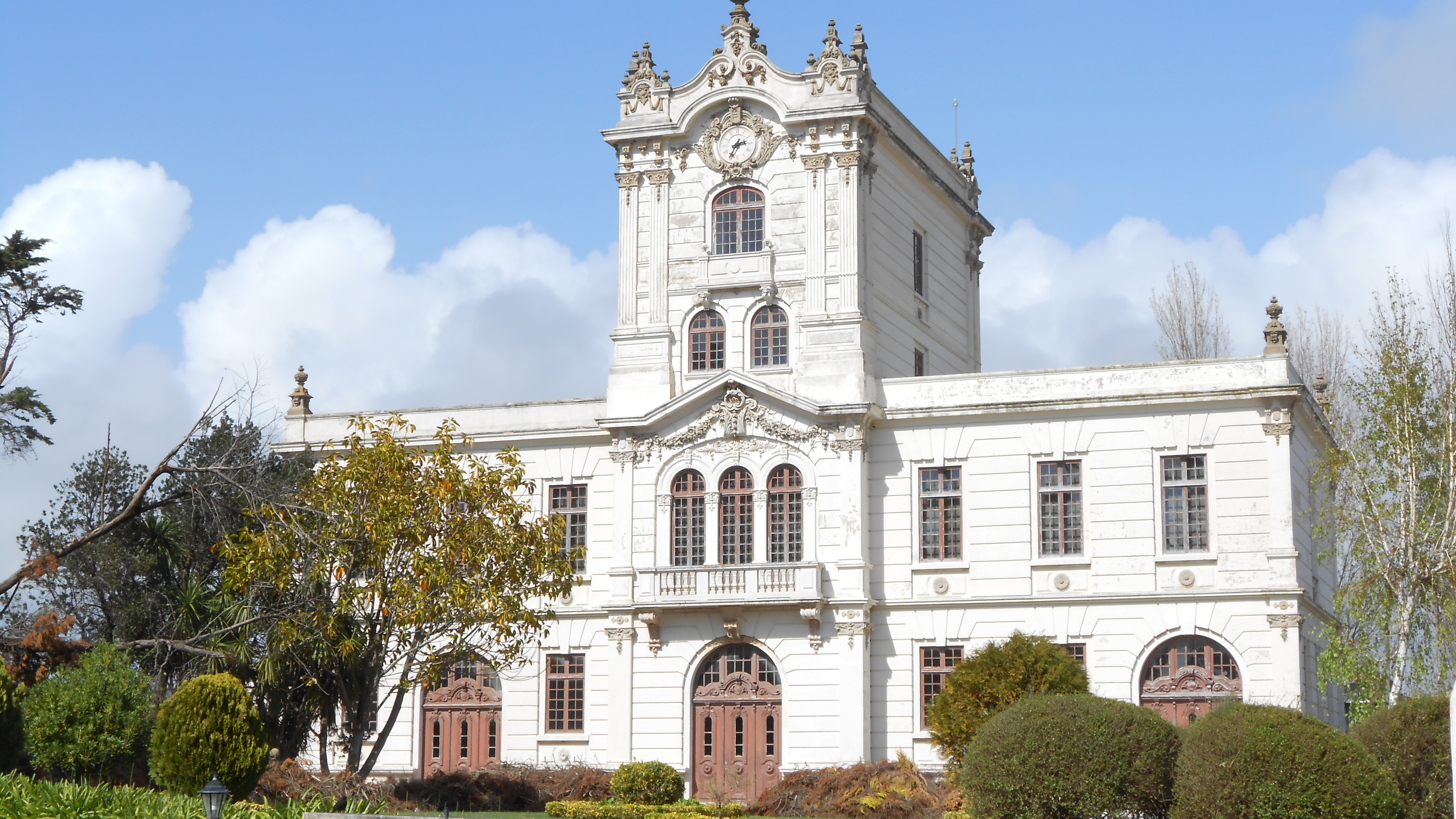
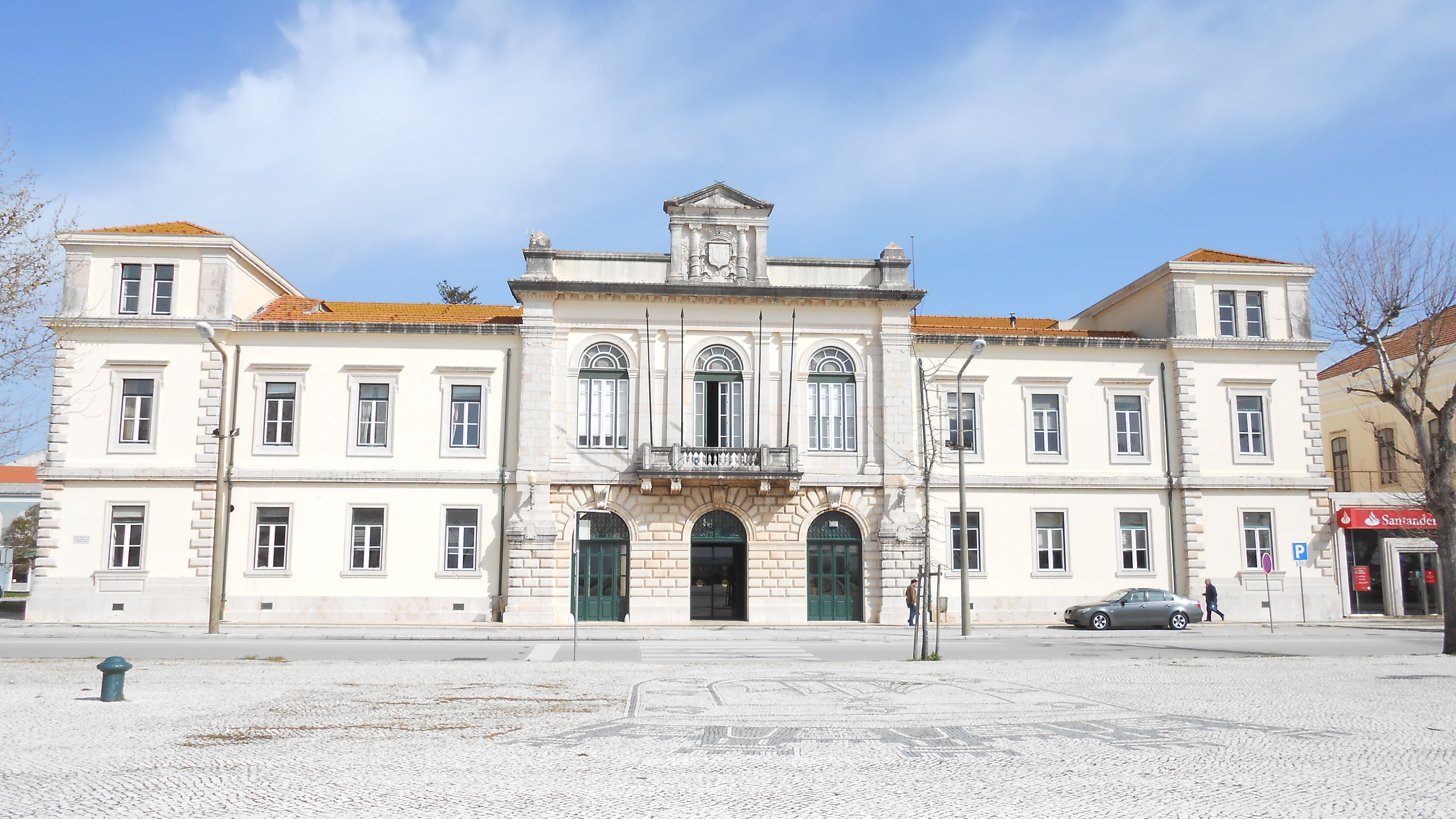

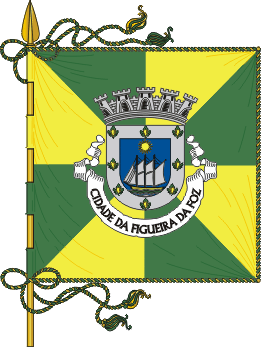
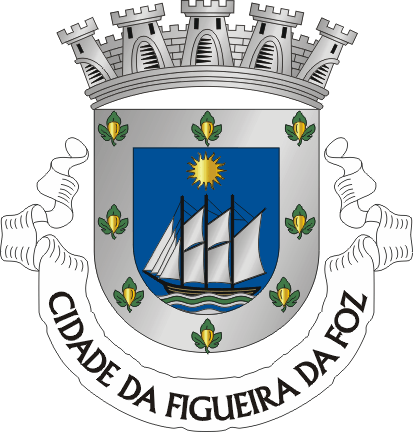
- Flag Coat of arms
- Interactive map of Figueira da Foz
- Location in Portugal
- Coordinates: 40°09′N 8°51′W
- Country: Portugal
- Region: Centro
- Intermunic. comm.: Região de Coimbra
- District: Coimbra
- Parishes: 14

Government
  - President: Pedro Santana Lopes (PSD)

Area
  - Total: 379.05 km^{2} (146.35 sq mi)

Population (2011)
  - Total: 62,125
  - Density: 163.90/km^{2} (424.49/sq mi)
- Time zone: UTC+00:00 (WET)
  - Summer (DST): UTC+01:00 (WEST)
- Local holiday: 24 June
- Website: http://www.cm-figfoz.pt/

Figueira da Foz, (Note: Portuguese pronunciation: [fiˈɣɐjɾɐ ðɐ ˈfɔʃ]) officially the City of Figueira da Foz, (Note: Portuguese: Cidade da Figueira da Foz) often called simply Figueira for short, is a city and a municipality in the Coimbra District, in Portugal. Practically at the midpoint of the Iberian Peninsula's Atlantic coast, it is located at the mouth of the Mondego River, 40 km (25 mi) west of Coimbra and sheltered by hills (Serra da Boa Viagem), sharing about the same latitude with Philadelphia, Baku and Beijing. The population of the municipality in 2011 was 62,125, in an area of 379.05 km^{2} (146.35 sq mi). The city of Figueira da Foz proper has a population of 46,600. It is the second largest city in the district of Coimbra.

It is a coastal city with several beaches, summer and seaport facilities on the Atlantic Ocean coast. As a tourism city, it plays an important part in the centre of the country. A zone of legal gambling, one can find in Figueira one of the biggest casinos of the Iberian Peninsula – the Casino Figueira.

== History ==
According to the legend, the place's name is due to a fig tree, which stood at the quay of Salmanha, where the fishermen used to tie up their boats. Foz means "place of discharge", often used at the point a river meets another body of water, specially where there is a clear energy or water flow clash. Some historical traces show that people were settling in this region since the Neolithic age. The oldest known document, however, dates from the year 1096. In this, an abbot named Pedro donates estates, which belonged to the church of S. Julião, to the cathedral Sé Velha of Coimbra.

Knowing the great importance rivers had in the development of cities and of ancient civilizations, the mouth of the Mondego must have played a central role in the fixation of men in this region and for the formation of settlements, which were the beginning of the city of Figueira da Foz. Figueira da Foz had a huge development during the 18th and 19th centuries due to the immense port movements and the expansion of the shipbuilding and cod drying industry, supplying the city with new communication routes, housing and other facilities. It was elevated to vila (small town) on 12 March 1771 and turned city (cidade) on 20 September 1882. Discovered as a sea resort by the end of the 19th century, it gained a great reputation in the 1920s and 1930s. The city had the Portuguese nickname of Rainha das Praias (Queen of the Beaches).

The municipality has some noted landmarks like the Sotto Mayor Palace, the old fishing village of Buarcos, the Serra da Boa Viagem – a small forested mountain by the Atlantic Ocean, several beaches, and its large seaside promenade paved with typical Portuguese pavement. Figueira da Foz has several Churches, many of them in the rich Baroque style, a Municipal Museum with the archaeological, ethnographic and artistic collection, the Santa Catarina Fort and the old Buarcos Fortress, the Relógio Tower by the main sandy beach, several archaeological vestiges throughout the municipality, several Palaces and Manor Houses (like the Sotto Mayor Palace), as well as several green spaces and small gardens like those in the area of Abadias.

In January 2026, Storm Kristin caused a catastrophic impact in the municipality. Losses of several tens of millions were estimated in the industry sector of Figueira da Foz.

== Economy ==
The city is an important industrial centre, producing wood pulp and paper (Navigator, formerly and still commonly known as Soporcel, and Celbi, part of Altri) and glass (Verallia, part of Saint-Gobain). It also has notable naval construction and fish industries. Until the turn of the 21st century, a factory of the CIMPOR Group was installed in the Mondego Cape (Cabo Mondego). The seaport and the fishing harbour are also important for its economy.

With its casino (Casino da Figueira), the marina, several hotels, restaurants and other tourist facilities, Figueira is an important Atlantic beach resort, in the center of Portugal's Silver Coast/Costa de Prata tourism region. A generally windy coastal area, its relatively cold seawaters makes a surf and kitesurf hotspot in the same fashion as other places throughout the west coast of Portugal, such as Nazaré, Peniche or Ericeira.

== Education ==
The city has well-equipped kindergartens, schools and high schools. It had two private universities: the Catholic University of Portugal (Figueira da Foz branch) and the Internacional University (Figueira da Foz branch) but they were closed in 2009 due to lack of funds and academic integrity. The municipality of Figueira da Foz is served by the ancient University of Coimbra and the Polytechnic Institute of Coimbra located 40 kilometers to the east of the city, in the district capital Coimbra.

== Parishes ==
Administratively, the municipality is divided into 14 civil parishes (freguesias):

- Alhadas
- Alqueidão
- Bom Sucesso
- Buarcos
- Ferreira-a-Nova
- Lavos
- Maiorca
- Marinha das Ondas
- Moinhos da Gândara
- Paião
- Quiaios
- São Pedro
- Tavarede
- Vila Verde

== Demographics ==
Historical population

Year	Pop.	±%
1864	32,953	—
1878	35,071	+6.4%
1890	39,857	+13.6%
1900	43,032	+8.0%
1911	46,044	+7.0%
1920	44,775	−2.8%
1930	49,590	+10.8%
1940	52,792	+6.5%

Year	Pop.	±%
1950	56,862	+7.7%
1960	57,631	+1.4%
1970	53,099	−7.9%
1981	58,559	+10.3%
1991	61,555	+5.1%
2001	62,601	+1.7%
2011	62,125	−0.8%
2021	58,951	−5.1%

Source: INE

== Geography ==
Figueira is about 40 kilometers west of Coimbra by the Atlantic Ocean and less than 200 kilometers to the north of Lisbon, on the mouth of the Mondego River and at the foothills of the Serra da Boa Viagem (mountain). The Cabo Mondego (cape) is inserted in the context of the Lusitanian Basin and is located on the western edge of the Serra da Boa Viagem (latitude 40º 11´ 3´´ N, longitude 08º 54´34´´W), approximately 6 km to the northwest of the city of Figueira da Foz proper. Classified as a Natural Monument since 2007, the cape is one of the most important testimonies for understanding the geological history of Portugal; represents, in a particularly complete way, some of the most important episodes in the history of the Earth that occurred during the Jurassic, for a time interval that is, approximately, between 185 and 140 million years, which justifies, at international level, the relevance of its classification, conservation and dissemination. The outcrop comprises a series of marine and fluvial-lake sediments that extend from the Upper Toarciano to the Titonian. This record, on some levels, is particularly continuous and rich in paleontological, sedimentological and paleomagnetic information, which are associated with exceptional observation conditions. It includes levels with the oldest footprints of megalosaurs (bipedal and carnivorous dinosaurs) described in Portugal and whose first reference dates from 1884.

== Climate ==
Figueira da Foz has a warm-summer Mediterranean climate (Köppen: Csb) characterized by mild, rainy winters and dry, warm summers. The annual average temperature is around 15 °C (59 °F) and the annual average rainfall is about 600 mm (24 in). The sea surface temperature varies from 14–15 °C (57–59 °F) in January and February to 18–19 °C (64–66 °F) in August and September. On summer afternoons moderate to (occasionally) strong north-westerly winds are common. Subtropical Storm Alpha, notable for being the only tropical or subtropical cyclone to make landfall in Portugal on record, made landfall at peak intensity in the general vicinity of the city on 18 September 2020. Figueira da Foz was, however, particularly hit hard when Storm (Hurricane) Leslie made landfall in mainland Europe right within the city on 13 October 2018. On 28 January 2026, Storm Kristin caused a catastrophic impact in Figueira da Foz, causing tens of millions of damage.

Climate data for Figueira da Foz
Month	Jan	Feb	Mar	Apr	May	Jun	Jul	Aug	Sep	Oct	Nov	Dec	Year
Record high °C (°F)	22.0 (71.6)	24.0 (75.2)	26.5 (79.7)	30.0 (86.0)	32.6 (90.7)	37.0 (98.6)	39.5 (103.1)	36.4 (97.5)	33.0 (91.4)	36.0 (96.8)	29.2 (84.6)	23.2 (73.8)	39.5 (103.1)
Mean daily maximum °C (°F)	14.0 (57.2)	15.0 (59.0)	17.1 (62.8)	18.8 (65.8)	19.9 (67.8)	22.7 (72.9)	23.9 (75.0)	24.6 (76.3)	23.4 (74.1)	21.2 (70.2)	17.2 (63.0)	14.5 (58.1)	19.4 (66.9)
Daily mean °C (°F)	10.4 (50.7)	11.2 (52.2)	13.2 (55.8)	14.7 (58.5)	16.0 (60.8)	18.5 (65.3)	19.6 (67.3)	20.1 (68.2)	19.2 (66.6)	17.1 (62.8)	13.6 (56.5)	11.1 (52.0)	15.4 (59.7)
Mean daily minimum °C (°F)	6.9 (44.4)	7.4 (45.3)	9.3 (48.7)	10.6 (51.1)	12.2 (54.0)	14.4 (57.9)	15.4 (59.7)	15.7 (60.3)	15.1 (59.2)	13.1 (55.6)	10.0 (50.0)	7.7 (45.9)	11.5 (52.7)
Record low °C (°F)	−0.1 (31.8)	−3.0 (26.6)	0.4 (32.7)	0.8 (33.4)	7.0 (44.6)	10.2 (50.4)	7.0 (44.6)	5.0 (41.0)	4.0 (39.2)	2.0 (35.6)	2.0 (35.6)	0.0 (32.0)	−3.0 (26.6)
Average precipitation mm (inches)	96.4 (3.80)	79.9 (3.15)	46.3 (1.82)	63.8 (2.51)	50.2 (1.98)	19.3 (0.76)	8.3 (0.33)	17.6 (0.69)	40.3 (1.59)	106.7 (4.20)	109.4 (4.31)	86.5 (3.41)	724.7 (28.55)
Average precipitation days	12	11	8	11	7	7	3	1	4	8	10	11	83
Source 1: climatedata.org, Portuguese Environmental Agency (precipitation 1985–2021)
Source 2: INMG, 1931-1960 Climatology (extremes & precipitation days)

Climate data for Barra do Mondego, 1954-1980
Month	Jan	Feb	Mar	Apr	May	Jun	Jul	Aug	Sep	Oct	Nov	Dec	Year
Record high °C (°F)	21.0 (69.8)	22.7 (72.9)	27.0 (80.6)	29.1 (84.4)	33.0 (91.4)	38.5 (101.3)	38.6 (101.5)	38.5 (101.3)	36.0 (96.8)	33.2 (91.8)	27.5 (81.5)	21.6 (70.9)	38.6 (101.5)
Mean daily maximum °C (°F)	13.9 (57.0)	14.6 (58.3)	15.9 (60.6)	17.5 (63.5)	19.3 (66.7)	21.3 (70.3)	23.0 (73.4)	23.0 (73.4)	22.2 (72.0)	20.8 (69.4)	16.8 (62.2)	14.4 (57.9)	18.6 (65.4)
Daily mean °C (°F)	10.8 (51.4)	10.9 (51.6)	12.3 (54.1)	13.8 (56.8)	15.6 (60.1)	17.7 (63.9)	18.8 (65.8)	19.0 (66.2)	18.3 (64.9)	16.6 (61.9)	12.8 (55.0)	10.4 (50.7)	14.8 (58.5)
Mean daily minimum °C (°F)	7.8 (46.0)	7.2 (45.0)	8.7 (47.7)	10.1 (50.2)	12.0 (53.6)	14.1 (57.4)	14.5 (58.1)	14.9 (58.8)	14.4 (57.9)	12.3 (54.1)	8.9 (48.0)	6.4 (43.5)	10.9 (51.7)
Record low °C (°F)	−2.0 (28.4)	−1.7 (28.9)	0.0 (32.0)	2.5 (36.5)	0.6 (33.1)	6.2 (43.2)	6.0 (42.8)	9.5 (49.1)	7.0 (44.6)	2.0 (35.6)	0.8 (33.4)	−2.5 (27.5)	−2.5 (27.5)
Average precipitation mm (inches)	115 (4.5)	102 (4.0)	79 (3.1)	56 (2.2)	53 (2.1)	23 (0.9)	5 (0.2)	10 (0.4)	31 (1.2)	79 (3.1)	89 (3.5)	83 (3.3)	725 (28.5)
Average precipitation days	16	18	15	10	9	6	2	3	6	11	13	13	122
Mean monthly sunshine hours	121	140	160	217	265	262	295	272	202	188	137	134	2,393
Source: IPMA

== Beaches of Figueira da Foz ==
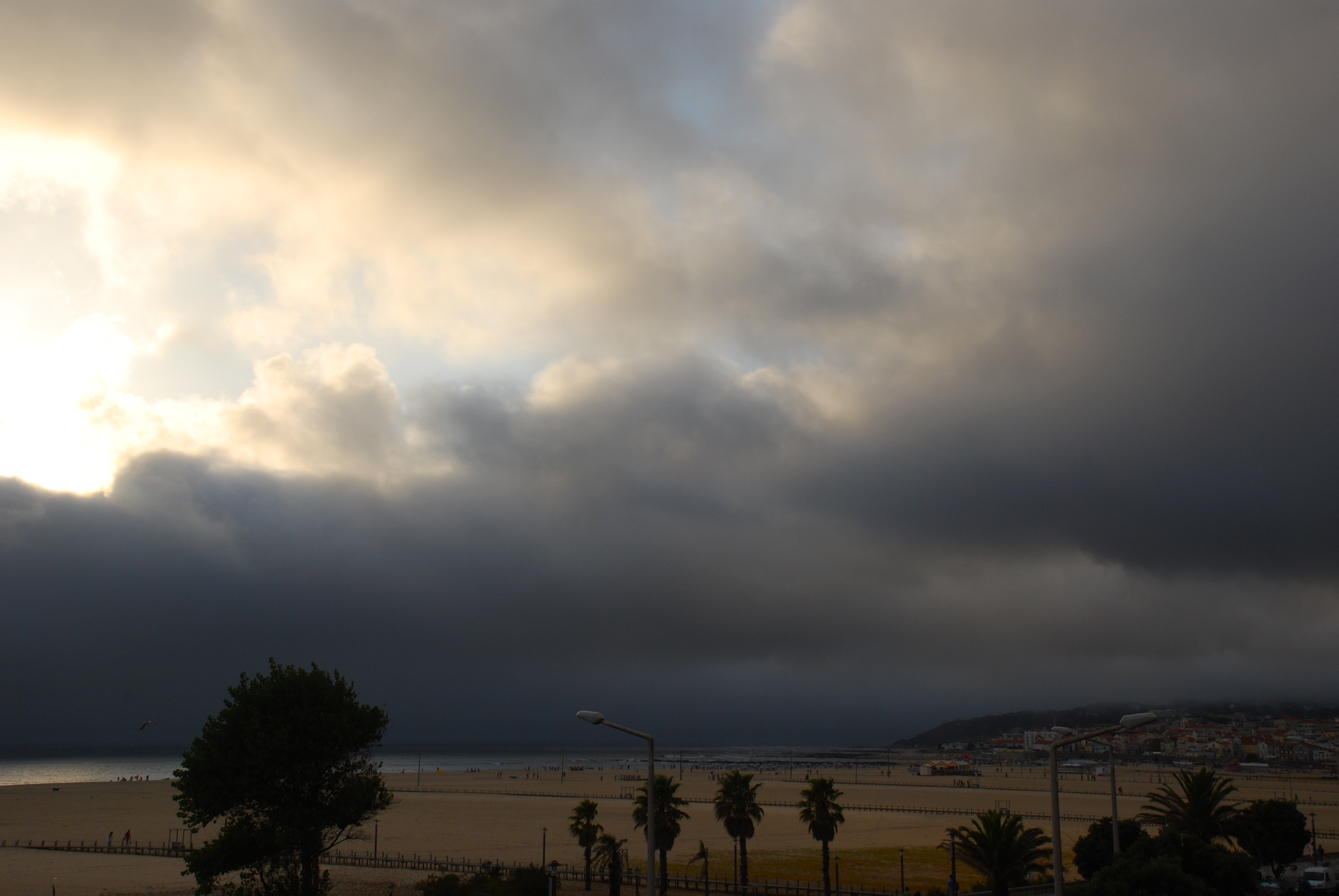
Buarcos Beach before a storm

- Praia da Figueira da Foz – Relógio – Praia da Bola de Nivea (Europe's widest urban beach)
- Praia da Gala – Figueira da Foz (Cova Gala)
- Praia da Murtinheira – Figueira da Foz
- Praia do Cabo Mondego – Figueira da Foz
- Praia da Leirosa – Figueira da Foz
- Praia da Costa de Lavos – Figueira da Foz
- Praia da Orbitur – Figueira da Foz
- Praia da Cova – Cova Gala (Figueira da Foz)
- Praia do Cabedelo – Figueira da Foz (Cova Gala)
- Praia da Claridade – Figueira da Foz
- Praia de Buarcos – Tamargueira (Figueira da Foz) e Plataforma (Figueira da Foz)
- Praia do Vale do Emide – Figueira da Foz
- Praia de Quiaios – Figueira da Foz (Quiaios)

== Gallery ==
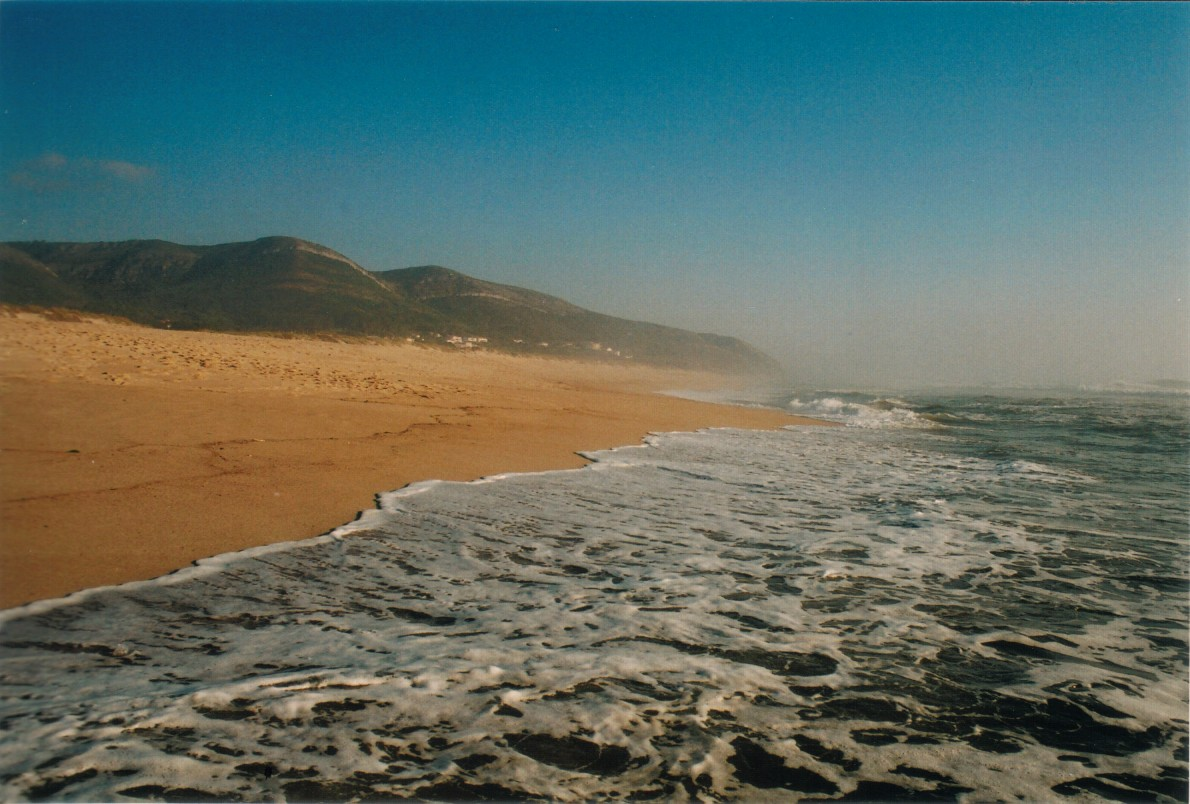
Beach in Quiaios

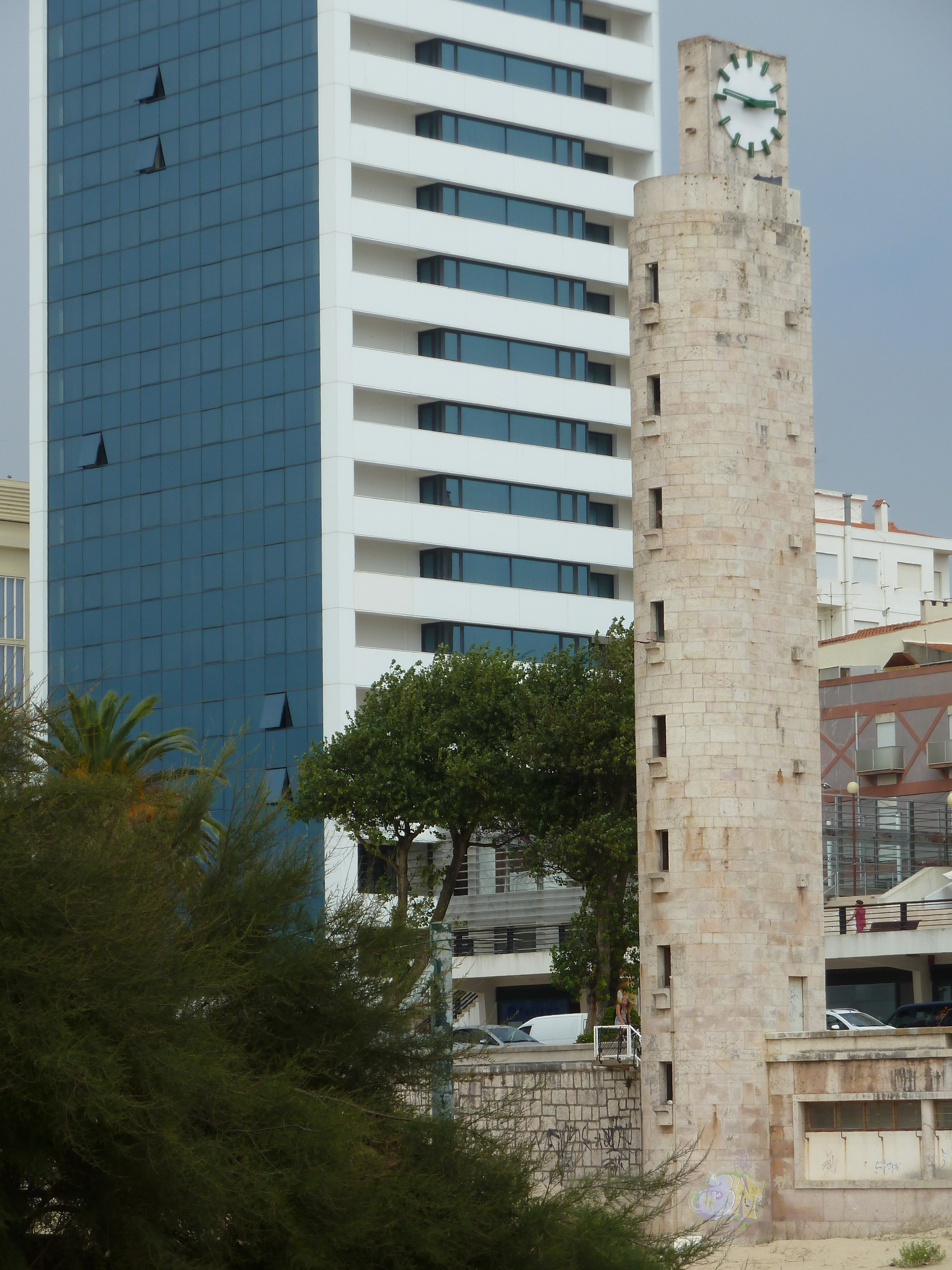
Torre do Relógio, Figueira da Foz

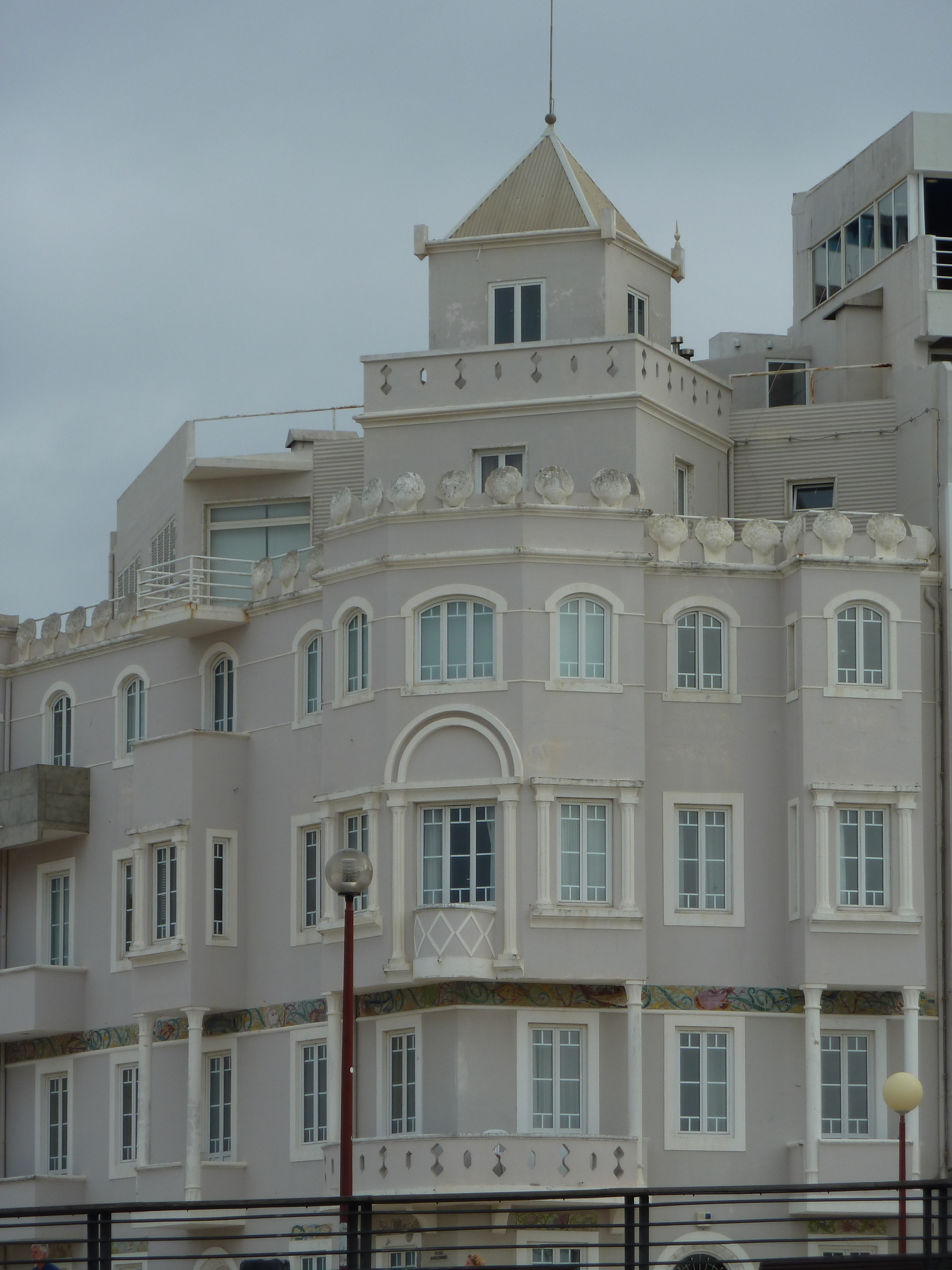
Castelo das Conchas

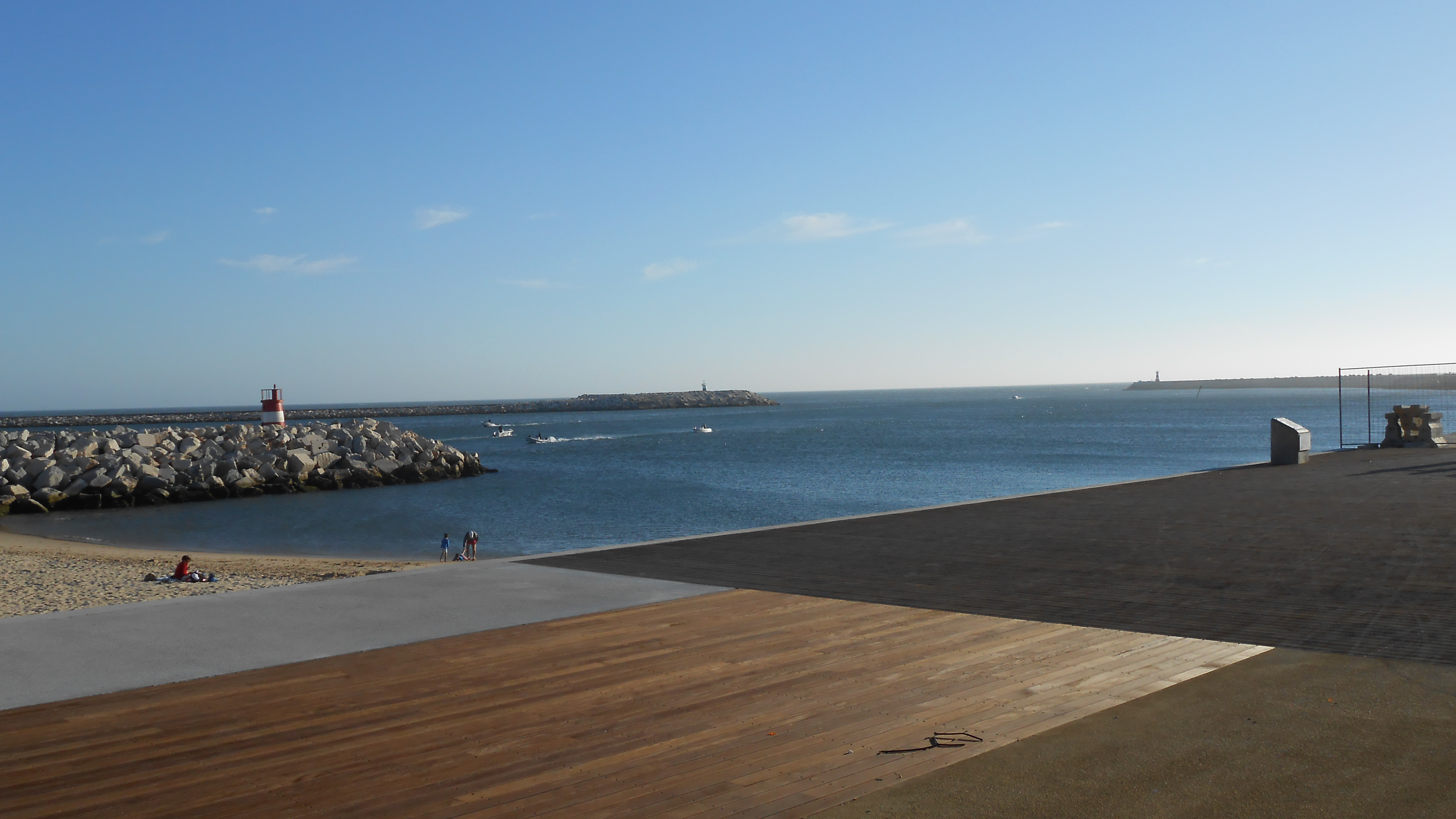
Beach off the city

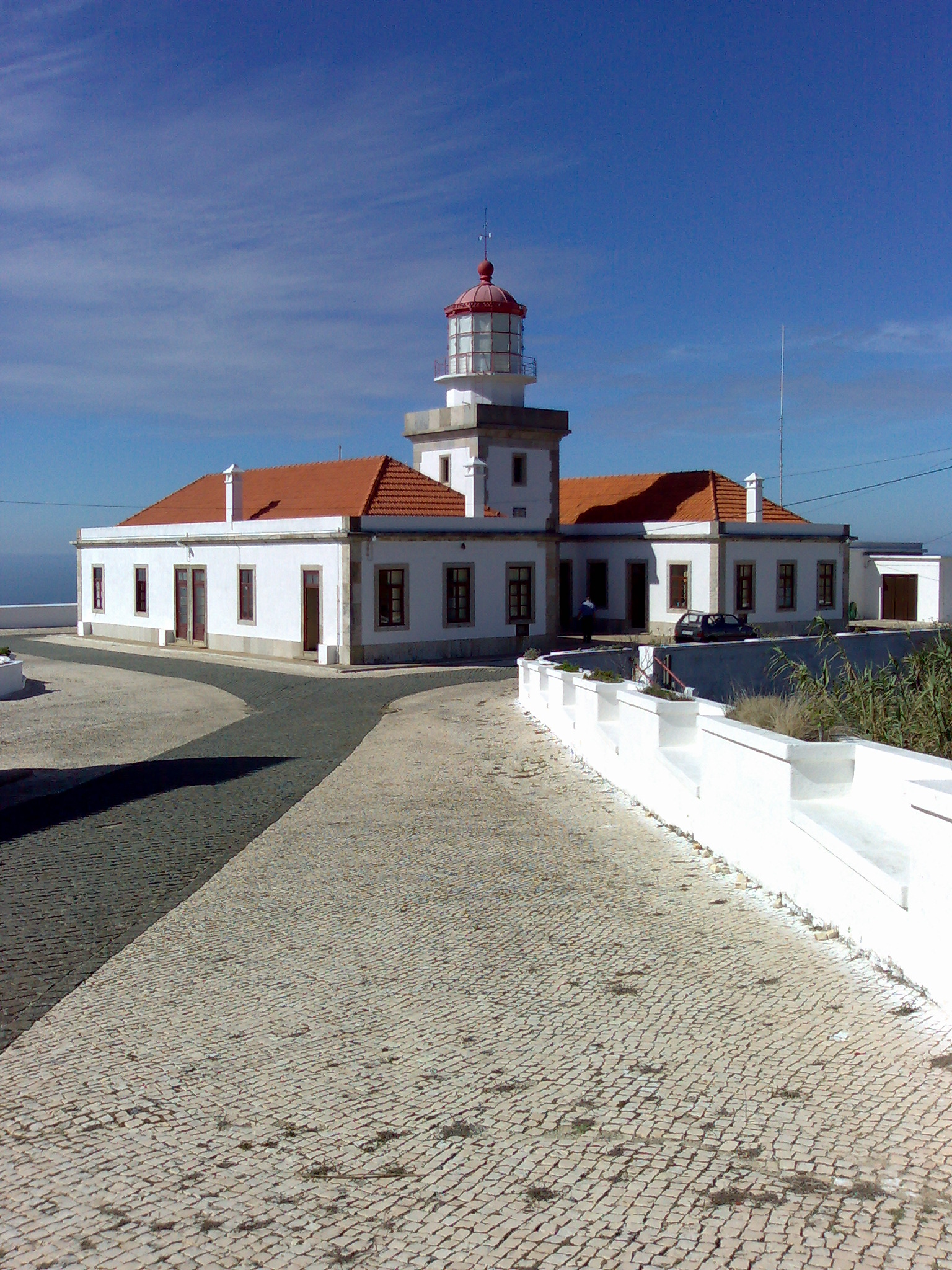
Farol do Mondego Lighthouse

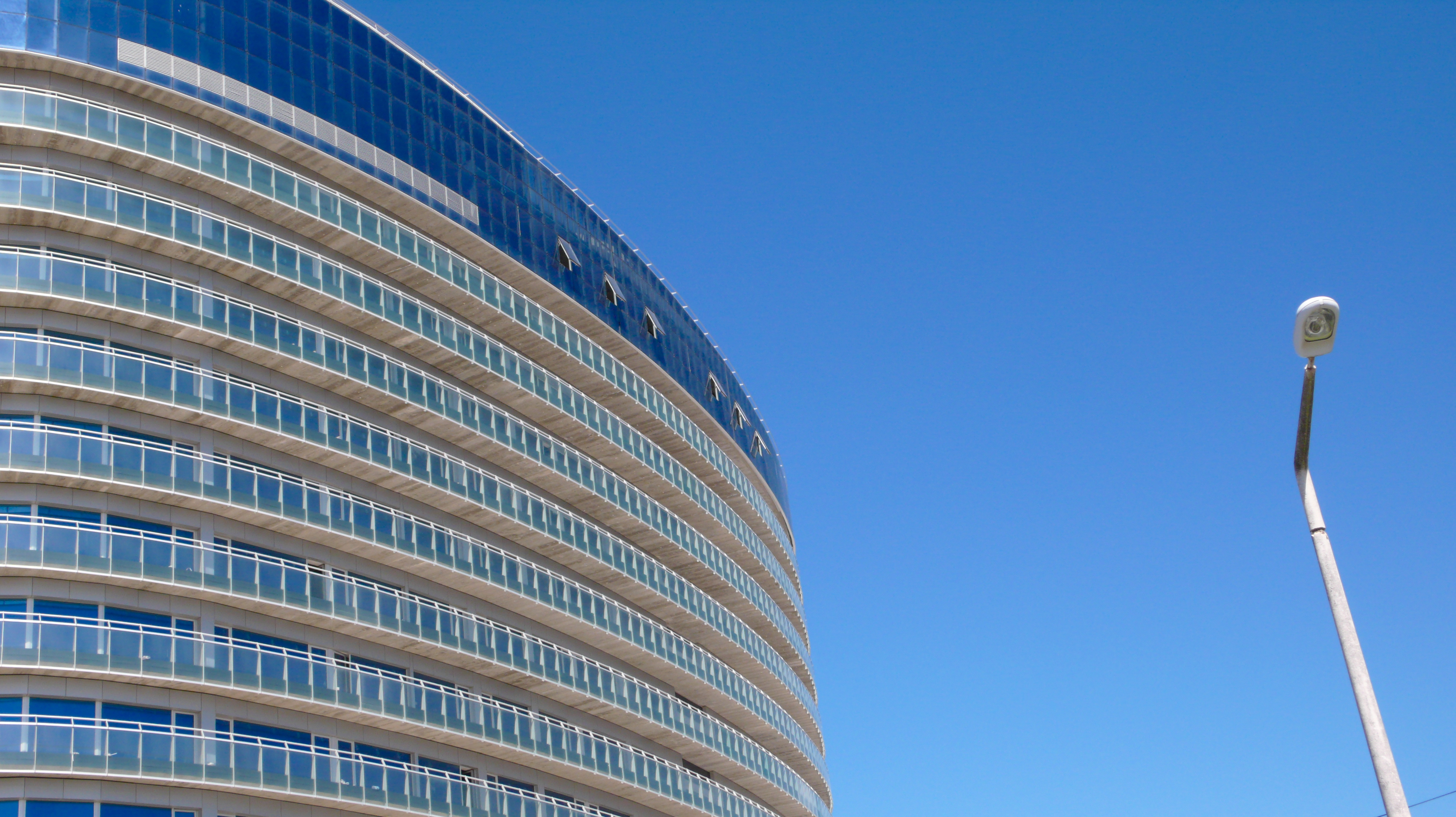
Hotels in Figueira

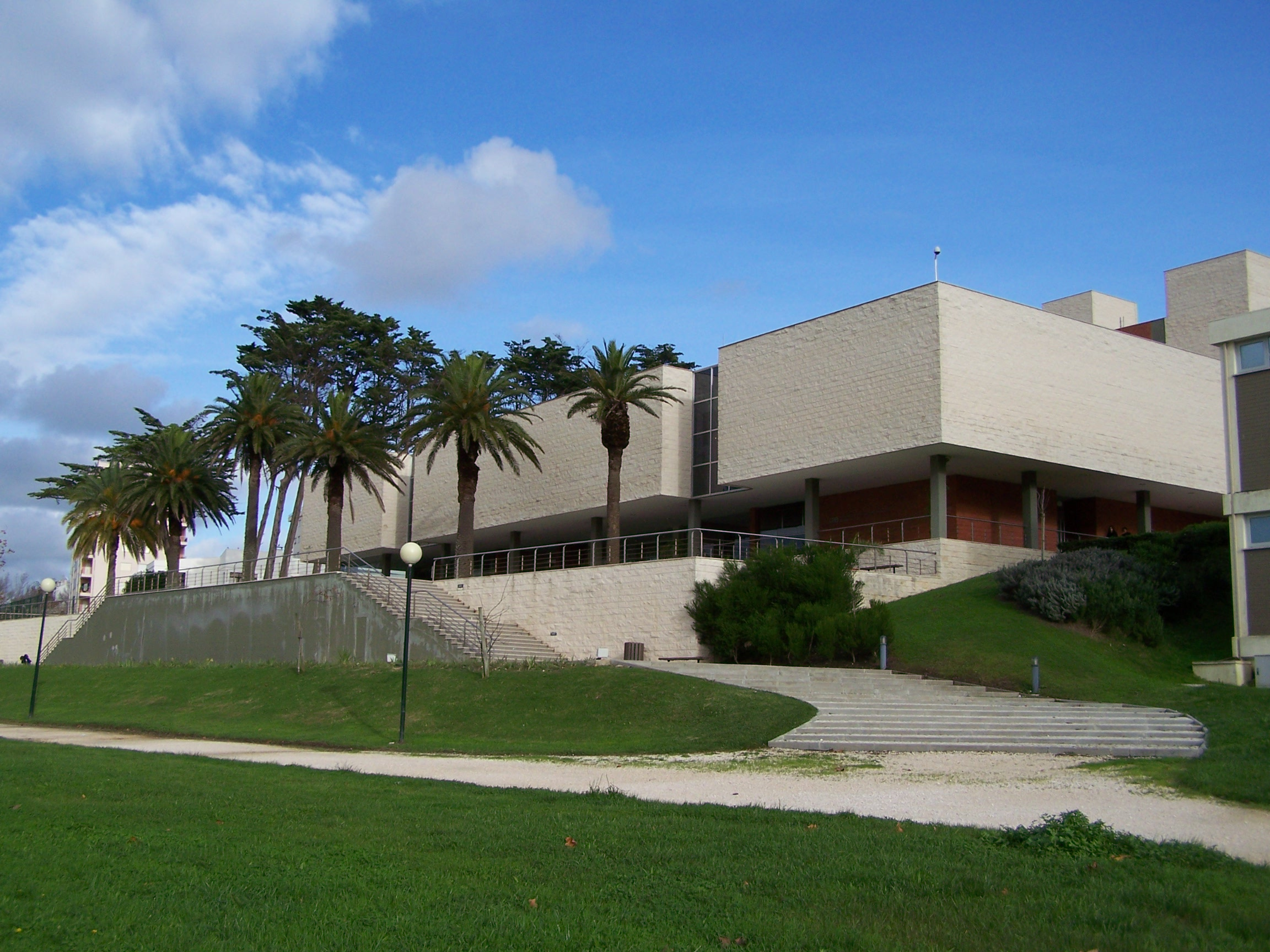
Figueira da Foz Arts Centre

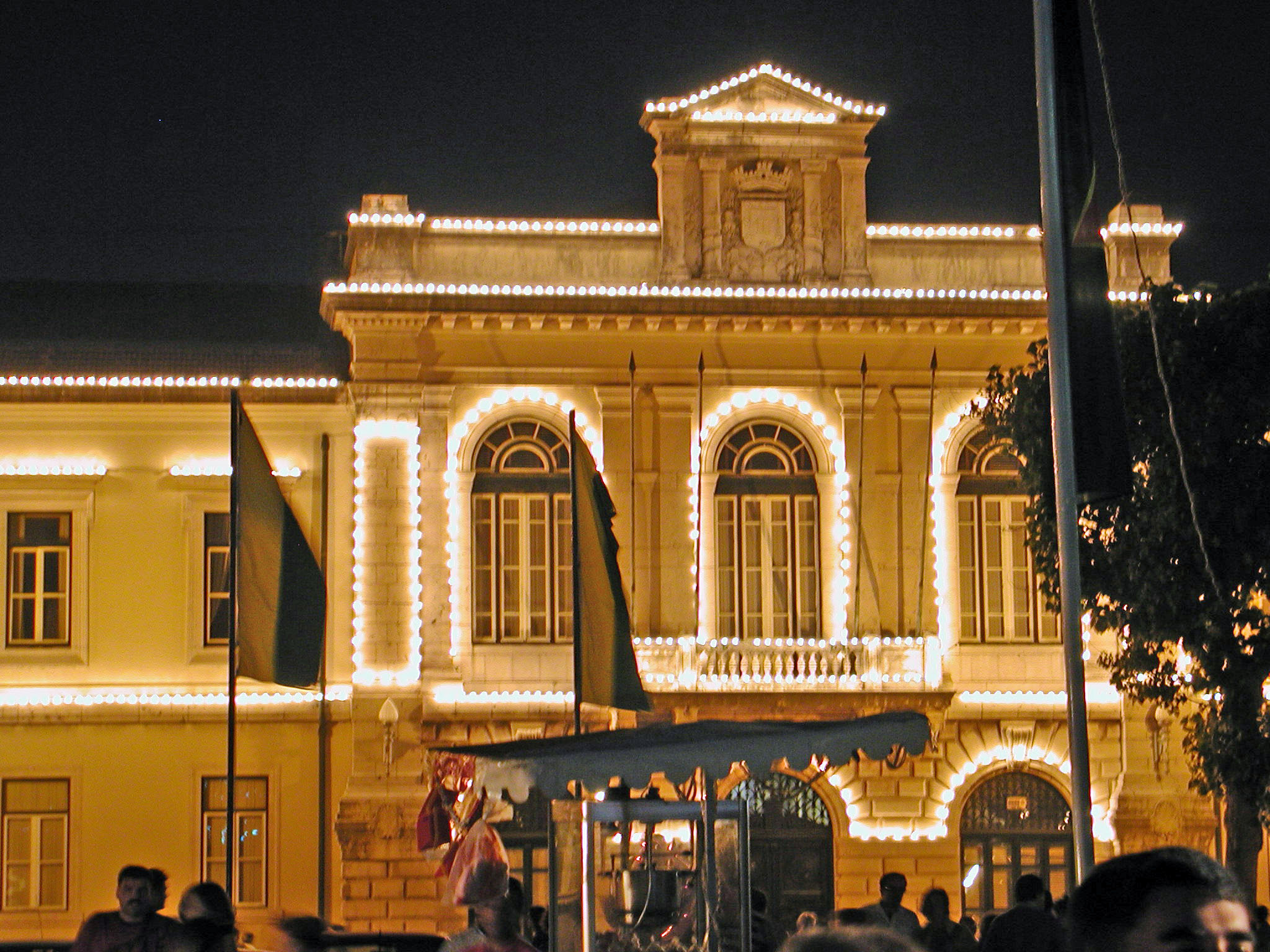
Municipal Council

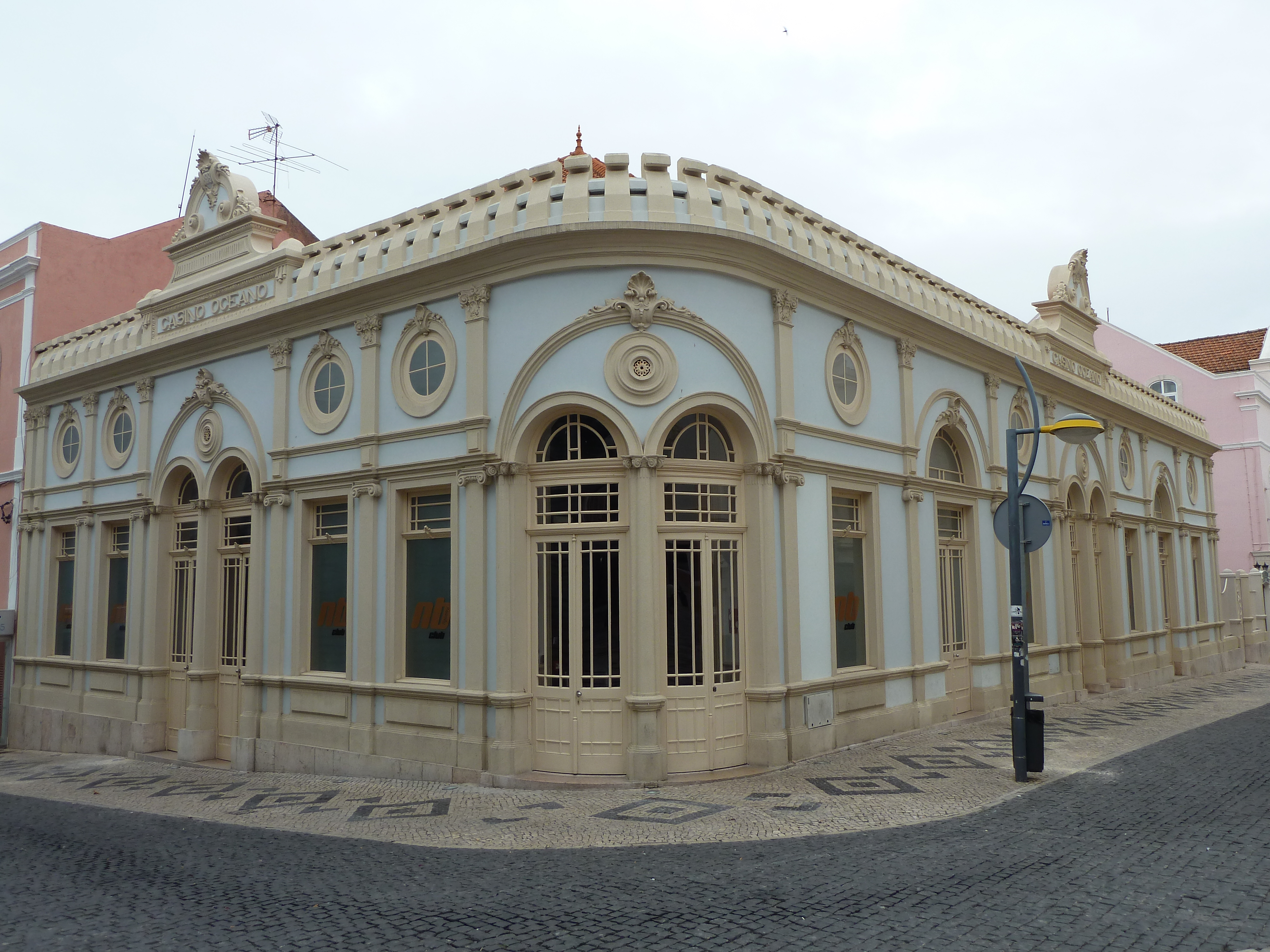
One of the casinos in Figueira da Foz, Portugal

== Sports ==
=== Football ===
Figueira da Foz was home to Associação Naval 1º Maio, best known for its football team which spent six seasons between 2005 and 2011 in the national top tier, the Primeira Liga. The club dissolved in 2017 and was succeeded by the phoenix club Associação Naval 1893.

=== Basketball ===
The city is also the home of the basketball department of Ginásio Clube Figueirense which competes in the Portuguese basketball league, adding rowing and swimming to their more notorious activities.

=== Tennis ===
The Tennis Club da Figueira da Foz was founded in 1917 and is still located next to the Santa Catarina Fort at the mouth of the Mondego River today.

=== Beach soccer ===
The city hosted the Mundialito de Futebol de Praia (also known as the Mundialito of Beach Soccer), an international beach soccer tournament, from 1997 to 2004. Held annually at Praia da Claridade beach in Figueira da Foz, the event featured national teams and served as a prominent international competition in the sport's early development under Beach Soccer Worldwide (BSWW) organization.

The tournament followed an inaugural edition in 1994 in Rio de Janeiro, Brazil, but from 1997 onward, Figueira da Foz became its consistent host for eight consecutive years (1997–2004), establishing the city as a key hub for beach soccer in Europe and a "cradle" for major competitions in Portugal.

Brazil dominated most editions, winning in 1997, 1999, 2000, 2001, and 2002, while the United States won in 1998, and for the home country, Portugal claimed the 2003 title. The 2004 edition marked the final year in Figueira da Foz before the tournament later moved to other locations. The event contributed significantly to the growth of beach soccer in Portugal, paving the way for the country's later successes in competitions like the Euro Beach Soccer League and FIFA Beach Soccer World Cup.

After 2004, Figueira da Foz continued to host major beach soccer events, such as stages of the Euro Beach Soccer League Superfinal.

=== Surfing ===
International surf competitions frequently take place in Figueira like the World Surf Championship 2010 or the IFCA Slaloms Worlds 2008.

== Transport ==
=== Road ===
Figueira da Foz is accessed by motorways A14, linking it to Coimbra and A1, and A17, linking it to Aveiro and A25 (reaching Spain) to the north and Leiria and A8 to the south. As an alternative to tolled motorways, it is served by routes EN109, linking Leiria to Gaia (near Porto), and EN111, linking Figueira da Foz to Coimbra and IC2, the toll-free alternative to A1. There are intercity bus services to Lisbon, Porto, Leiria, Aveiro and Viseu. There are also regional bus services to Coimbra and places in between.

=== Rail ===
The city is served by its own railway terminus, Figueira da Foz railway station, with suburban trains linking it to Coimbra and some regional trains running along the Western Line, although there is no direct railway service to Lisbon or Porto. The closest station to be served by intercity railway services is Alfarelos, at the Northern Line, 18 km to the east. Coimbra-B, 36 km to the east, is the closest station serving high-speed Alfa Pendular trains. Both have scheduled links to Lisbon, Porto and other major cities across Portugal. Pombal, slightly closer at 32 km to the southeast, also serves Alfa Pendular trains, but there is no direct railway link between the two cities.

=== Water ===
Figueira da Foz has its own seaport, Port of Figueira da Foz along river Mondego, featuring a marina, a container terminal and naval shipyards. In addition, there are facilities for watersports, in particular rowing.

=== Air ===
The city does not have its own airport. The closest international airport to Figueira da Foz is Porto Airport (OPO), located 120 km to the north and offering several international destinations primarily in Europe, although Lisbon Airport (LIS), located 155 km to the south, offers more intercontinental destinations, in particular to North America, South America and Africa. The closest aerodrome handling private flights is Bissaya Barreto Aerodrome (CBP) in Coimbra, 32 km to the east, where the Aeroclube da Figueira da Foz is based. The closest runway capable of handling widebody aircraft is at Monte Real Air Base in Leiria, some 40 km to the south, but it is home to the Portuguese Air Force's jet fighter aircraft, making it difficult to convert the airbase to commercial aviation due to its strategic position in Portugal's defence system.

An international airport in Figueira da Foz, the Silver Coast International Airport, was planned in the early 1990s, which was to be located in Lavos, 7 km south of the city centre—it has never been built.

== International Relations ==
Figueira da Foz is twinned with:

- Angoche, Nampula, Mozambique
- Ciudad Rodrigo, Castile and León, Spain
- Gradignan, Gironde, France
- Mortágua, Viseu, Portugal
- (United States) New Bedford, Massachusetts, USA
- (Cape Verde) Praia, Santiago, Cabo Verde
- Yevpatoria, Crimea, Ukraine

== Notable people ==
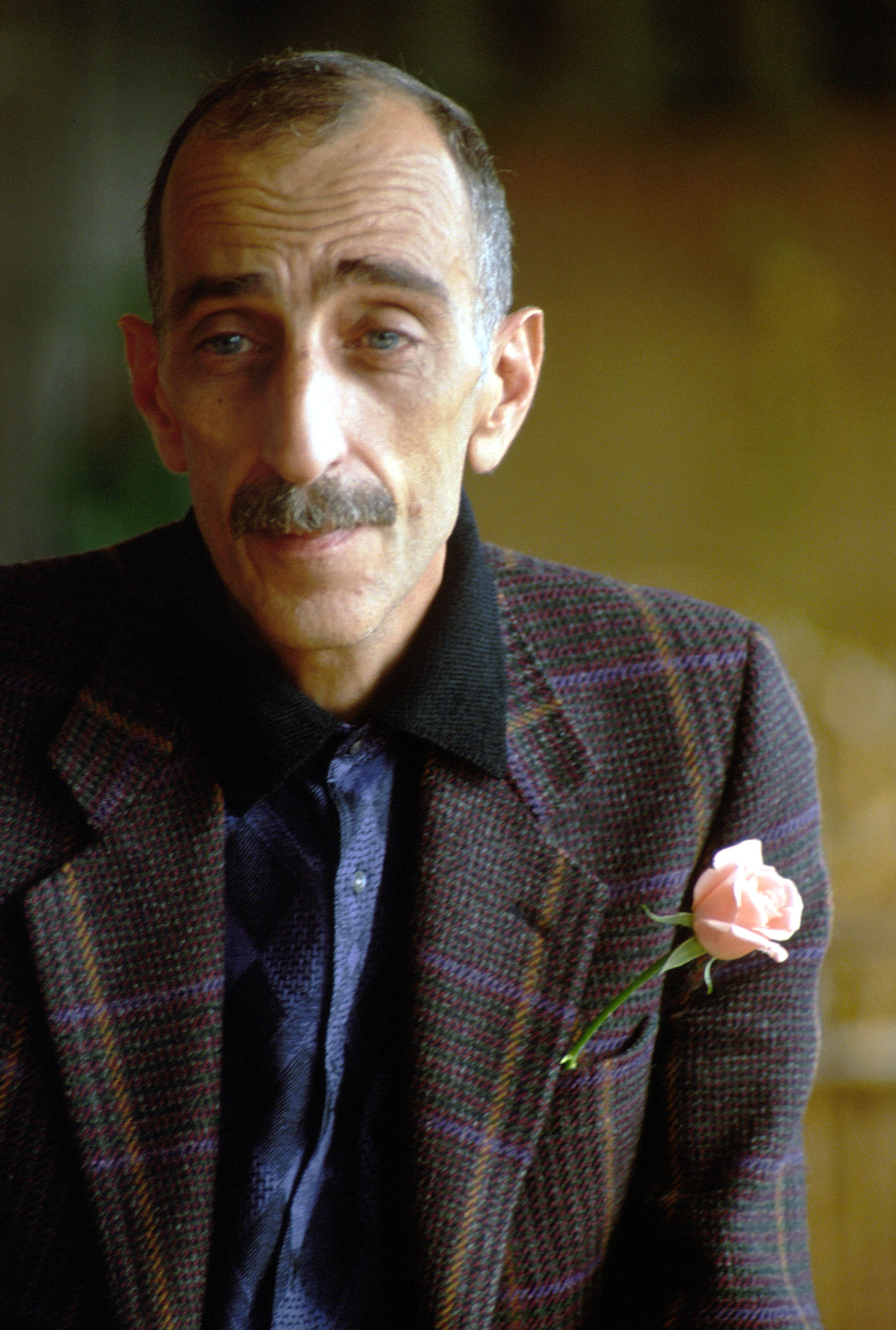
Joao Cesar Monteiro, 1989

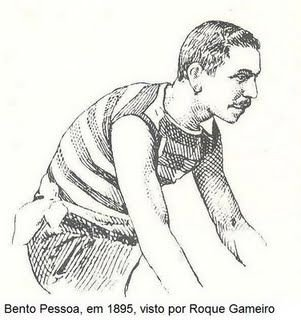
José Bento Pessoa, 1895

- Lucrécia de Arriaga (1844–1927), the wife of Manuel de Arriaga, the first President of Portugal, thus the first First Lady of Portugal, 1911 to 1915
- David de Souza, (Wiki PT) (1880–1918), composer, conductor and cellist
- Luís Wittnich Carrisso (1886–1937), a botanist, professor at the University of Coimbra
- Carlos Galvão de Melo (1921–2008), a Portuguese Air Force officer and politician
- João César Monteiro (1939–2003), film director, actor, writer and film critic.
- João Mário Grilo (born 1958), a film director, author and professor.
- Afonso Cruz (born 1971), a Portuguese novelist, animator, illustrator and musician
- Nuno Camarneiro (born 1977), a Portuguese novelist.
- Marco Mendes (born 1978), a Portuguese artist and comic author.
- Susana Guerra (born 1980), stage name Suzy, singer, rep. for Portugal in Eurovision Song Contest 2014
- Rita Camarneiro (born 1988), TV presenter, actress and comedian.

=== Sport ===
- José Bento Pessoa (1874–1954), a Portuguese record-winning cyclist.
- Alves Barbosa (1931–2018), a Portuguese professional road cyclist.
- Ticha Penicheiro (born 1974), a sports agent and former WNBA basketball player
- Rui Cordeiro (born 1976), rugby union footballer
- Sérgio Grilo (born 1983), a retired footballer and coach with over 300 club caps.
- Hugo Almeida (born 1984), a former footballer with 409 club caps and 57 for Portugal

== See also ==
- Região de Coimbra
- Coimbra District
- Mondego River
- Centro Region, Portugal
