= List of botanical gardens in Portugal =

Botanical gardens in Portugal have collections consisting entirely of Portugal native and endemic species; most have a collection that include plants from around the world. There are botanical gardens and arboreta in all states and territories of Portugal, most are administered by local governments, some are privately owned.

- Porto Botanical Garden, Porto
- Lisbon Tropical Botanical Garden
- Botanical Garden of the University of Coimbra, Coimbra (Botanic Gardens Conservation International accredited)
- Botanical Garden of the University of Lisbon, Lisbon (Botanic Gardens Conservation International accredited)
- Madeira Botanical Garden, Madeira,
- Botanical Garden of Ajuda, Lisbon,
- Botanical Garden of the University of Trás-os-Montes e Alto Douro, Vila Real
- Terra Nostra Park, São Miguel Island
- Orchard of Flavours Botanical Garden, Luz de Tavira, Algarve (Botanic Gardens Conservation International accredited)
