= Lasiodiscus fasciculiflorus =

Conservation status
- Least Concern (IUCN 3.1)

Scientific classification
- Kingdom: Plantae
- Clade: Tracheophytes
- Clade: Angiosperms
- Clade: Eudicots
- Clade: Rosids
- Order: Rosales
- Family: Rhamnaceae
- Genus: Lasiodiscus
- Species: L. fasciculiflorus

Binomial name
- Lasiodiscus fasciculiflorus Engl.

Synonyms
- Lasiodiscus contumax N.Hallé; Lasiodiscus usambarensis var. gossweileri Cavaco

Species of tree

Lasiodiscus fasciculiflorus is a species of shrub or small tree in the family Rhamnaceae that is native to forests of the West African tropics. It occurs from Sierra Leone to Nigeria and the D.R.C. The bark is used in medicine to treat various ailments.
