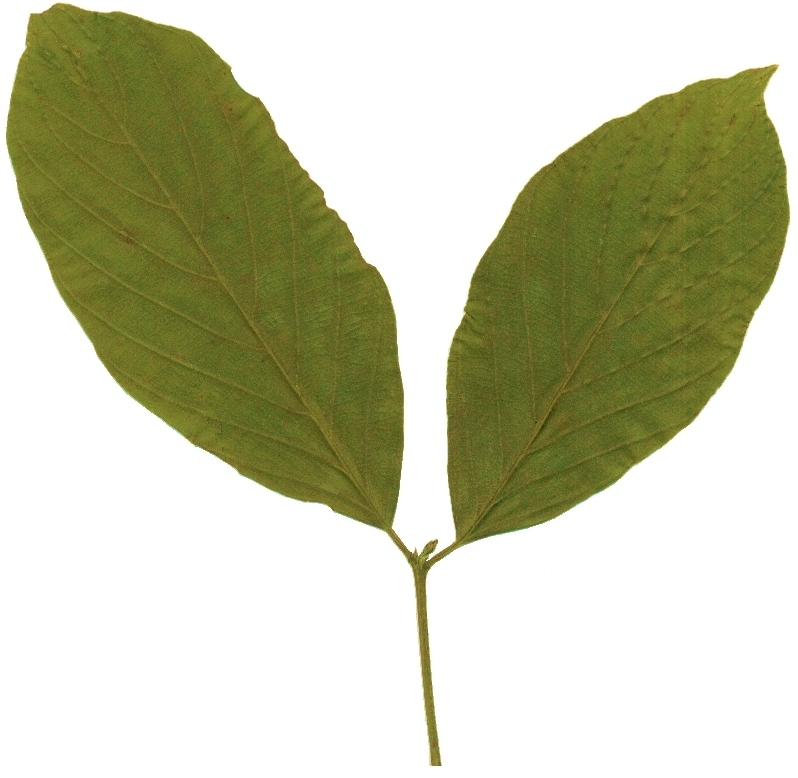
- L. mildbraedii with opposite leaf arrangement

Scientific classification
- Kingdom: Plantae
- Clade: Embryophytes
- Clade: Tracheophytes
- Clade: Angiosperms
- Clade: Eudicots
- Clade: Rosids
- Order: Rosales
- Family: Rhamnaceae
- Genus: Lasiodiscus; J.D. Hook.

Species
- See text

= Lasiodiscus =

Red-hair bushes

Genus of flowering plants

Lasiodiscus, commonly known as red-hair bushes, is a small plant genus in the family Rhamnaceae. It is endemic to Africa and its adjacent islands.

== Description ==
The small trees have opposite, often asymmetric leaves. As with Colubrina, the flower ovaries are surrounded by a nectariferous disc that fills the receptacle.

== Habitat ==
They regularly occur in the understorey of tropical forests, or alternatively in swamp forest. One species, L. rozeirae, is limited to mountain forest understorey.

== Relationships ==
Lasiodiscus is morphologically similar to Colubrina, which occurs in the Neotropics, Asia and Afrotropics, but preliminary molecular analysis failed to group them as nearest relatives.

== Species ==
There are 9 accepted species:

- Lasiodiscus chevalieri Hutch. –
- Lasiodiscus fasciculiflorus Engl. – Sierra Leone to Nigeria, w Cameroon and D.R.C.
- Lasiodiscus holtzii Engl. – East Africa
- Lasiodiscus mannii Hook. – central Africa
- Lasiodiscus marmoratus C.H. Wright – Cameroon
- Lasiodiscus mildbraedii Engl. – African tropics and locally along east coast to South Africa
- Lasiodiscus pervillei Baill. – Africa, Madagascar, Mauritius, Réunion and Comores

L. p. pervillei – widespread in Madagascar
L. p. ferrugineus (Verdc.) Figueiredo – local and vulnerable in East Africa

- Lasiodiscus rozeirae A.W. Exell – São Tomé in Gulf of Guinea, vulnerable
- Lasiodiscus usambarensis Engl. – Usambara Mountains and locally to Zimbabwe
