= Arnaldo Rozeira =

Portuguese botanist (1912–1984)

- Born: Arnaldo Deodato da Fonseca Rozeira; 29 April 1912; Portuguese São Tomé and Príncipe
- Died: March 8, 1984 (aged 71); Lordelo do Ouro, Portugal
- Scientific career
- Fields: Natural History

Arnaldo Deodato da Fonseca Rozeira (São Tomé and Príncipe, 29 April 1912 — Lordelo do Ouro, 8 March 1984), also known as Arnaldo Rozeira or Arnaldo Roseira, was a botanist, Dean of the Faculty of Sciences of the University of Porto between April 1972 and April 1974, and director of the Botanical Garden of Porto between 1960 and 1974 (Jardim Botânico do Porto) and again between January and April 1982.

== Biography ==
He completed his Doctorate in 1944 with the thesis "Flora of Trás-os-Montes and Alto Douro" ("A flora de Trás-os-Montes e Alto Douro"). He was named professor at the University of Porto's Faculty of Sciences in 1949. In 1957, he presented a lecture entitled "Botanical Studies of the Islands of São Tomé and Príncipe. Fundamental Problems" and was later appointed full professor. During his academic career, he made several botanical campaigns in São Tomé and Portugal. He was Director of the Museum of Anthropology in 1958-1959 and Director of the Botanical Institute Gonçalo Sampaio between 1967 and 1970. He was the Dean of the Faculty of Sciences of the University of Porto between April 1972 and April 1974, and director of the Botanical Garden of Porto between 1960 and 1974 and again between January and April 1982.

He is the author of books on flora in the regions of São Tomé and Príncipe, Trás-os-Montes and Alto Douro in Portugal. He organized, together with Américo Pires de Lima, the publication of the first edition in 1949 of "Iconografia Selecta da Flora Portuguesa", a reference treaty written by his professor Gonçalo Sampaio (1865–1937) and illustrated by Sara Cabral Ferreira.

His work on the scientific classification of plants and algae is considered a reference. He discovered new species such as Lasiodiscus rozeirae.

The Herbarium of the Natural History and Science Museum at Porto University harbors a vast collection of Portuguese and former Portuguese colonies flora, such as the collections from São Tomé and Príncipe islands. This collection is composed of specimens brought by several collectors, the majority from the 1950s. Professor Arnaldo Rozeira led three botanical missions to collect specimens to improve the phytosociological knowledge of both islands São Tomé and Príncipe and is the largest contributor to the São Tomé and Príncipe collection at Porto University's Herbarium, being responsible for up to 65% of the total collection. The biological collection is well furbished with documentation such as correspondence, photographs, manuscripts, notebooks, inventories and definitive publications. He also contributed to the Herbarium of University of Coimbra and the National Museum of Natural History and Science, Lisbon.

He married Maria Irene de Mariz Teixeira and had 10 children, Arnaldo Eduardo, Maria Irene, António José, Maria do Céu, Augusto Duarte, Nuno Manuel, João Luís, Armando Jorge, Maria da Graça and Paulo Maria de Mariz Rozeira. He was grandson of Francisco Lopes Roseira (1825–1906), founder of Lamego College in 1859, and a parent of Luís Roseira, politician and member of the Constituent Assembly of Portugal elected in 1975, as well as Maria de Belém Roseira, politician and candidate to the 2016 presidential elections.

== See also ==
- Lasiodiscus rozeirae
