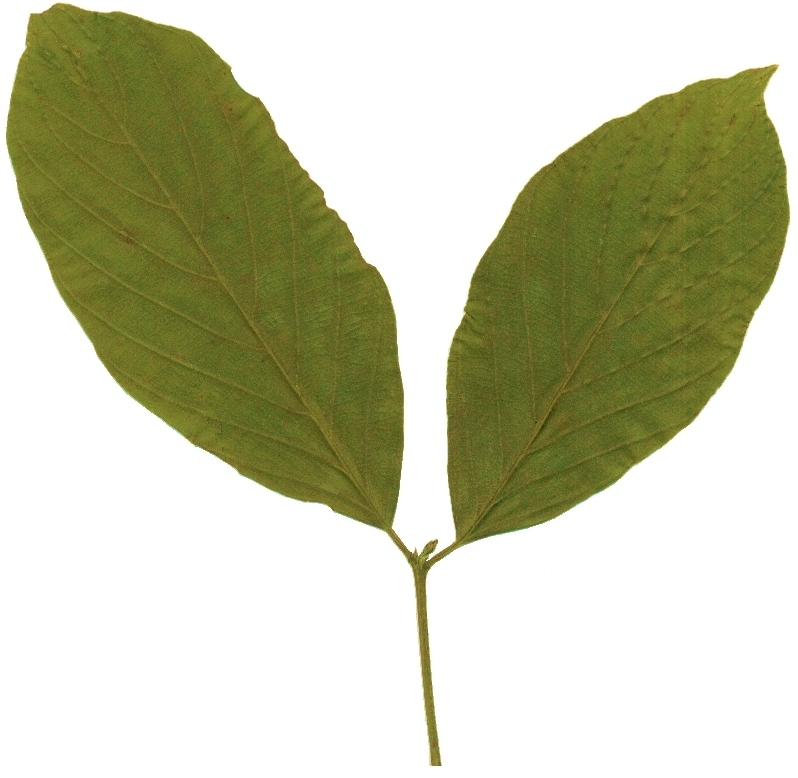
- Lasiodiscus mildbraedii, pressed leaves showing opposite arrangement

Conservation status
- Least Concern (IUCN 3.1)

Scientific classification
- Kingdom: Plantae
- Clade: Tracheophytes
- Clade: Angiosperms
- Clade: Eudicots
- Clade: Rosids
- Order: Rosales
- Family: Rhamnaceae
- Genus: Lasiodiscus
- Species: L. mildbraedii

Binomial name
- Lasiodiscus mildbraedii Engl.

= Lasiodiscus mildbraedii =

Species of tree

Lasiodiscus mildbraedii is small tree in the family Rhamnaceae. It is native to tropical Africa, including Côte d'Ivoire, Ghana, Nigeria, the Gulf of Guinea Islands, and Cameroon in West Africa, the Democratic Republic of the Congo, Sudan, and Uganda in central Africa, and Tanzania and Mozambique in East Africa. It is sometimes a dominant component of tropical forest understorey. Groups of small pale flowers are carried on long stalks in spring. The fruits reach maturity at the end of summer. The leaves have an opposite arrangement as in all members of Lasiodiscus. The leaf texture is somewhat rough and leathery. Leaf undersides are somewhat rufous toned.
