= Lasiodiscus rozeirae =

Conservation status
- Vulnerable (IUCN 2.3)

Scientific classification
- Kingdom: Plantae
- Clade: Tracheophytes
- Clade: Angiosperms
- Clade: Eudicots
- Clade: Rosids
- Order: Rosales
- Family: Rhamnaceae
- Genus: Lasiodiscus
- Species: L. rozeirae

Binomial name
- Lasiodiscus rozeirae Exell

Species of tree

Lasiodiscus rozeirae is a small tree in the family Rhamnaceae. It was first described in 1958 by Arthur Wallis Exell after a specimen collected by Portuguese botanist Arnaldo Rozeira from São Tomé Island in the Gulf of Guinea. The species has not been found since it was collected in 1954. It is not known whether there is still an extant population.
