= Terra Nostra Park =

Botanical Garden. Tourist attractions in the Azores

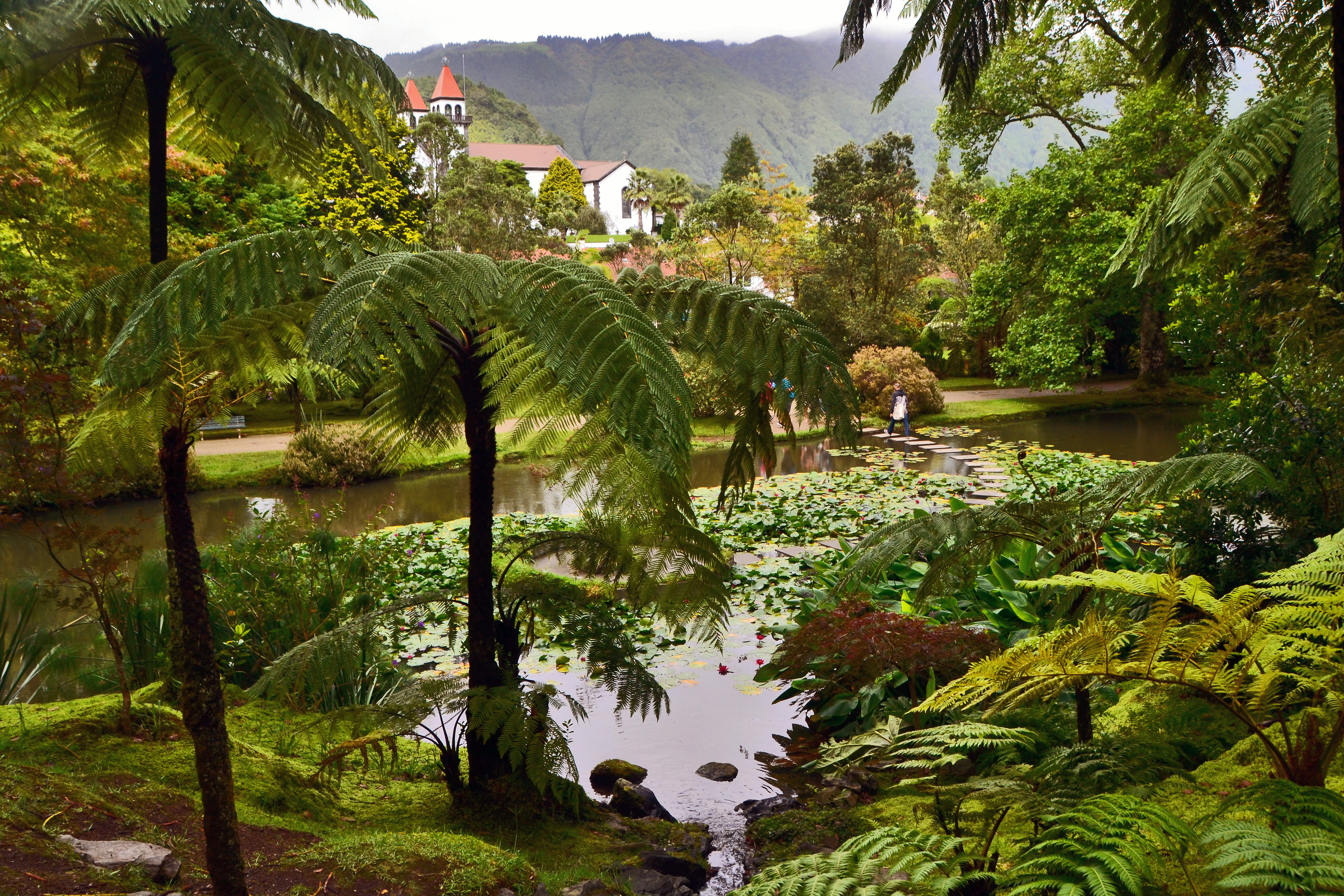
- Terra Nostra - a botanical paradise
- Interactive map of Terra Nostra Park
- Type: Park, botanical garden.
- Location: Furnas, São Miguel Island, Portugal
- Coordinates: 37°46′17″N 25°18′53″W
- Area: circa 12.5 hectares (0.048 sq mi)
- Created: 1780
- Open: Yes
- Website: www.parqueterranostra.com

The Terra Nostra Park (Portuguese: Parque Terra Nostra) is a botanical garden in Furnas in the Povoação municipality on the Portuguese Azores island of São Miguel.:

== History ==
The garden's inception dates back to 1780, when the then United States Consul on the island of São Miguel, Thomas Hickling, in 1775 built his summer residence here, which later became known as Yankee Hall.

Only in the middle of the 19th century did the area of two hectares gradually increase. The Viscondes da Praia, or later the Bensaude family, expanded the site to an attractive size. Water gardens and plantings with dark alleys and flower beds were created, and Yankee Hall was converted into a hotel. In 1872, when the garden was already in the hands of the 2nd Visconde of Praia, he brought in Portuguese and English specialists. These carried out a reconstruction of the existing canal, built caves and avenues of boxwood, but the paths with orange trees have disappeared. Trees have been imported from North America, Australia, New Zealand, China and South Africa.

In the 1930s, the Terra Nostra Park was acquired by Vasco Bensaude, who saw it primarily as an addition to the Terra Nostra Hotel. At that time, the park reached an area of 12.5 hectares, divided into gardens and forest. Vasco Bensaude had a great knowledge of botany and horticulture, as did his gardener of Scottish origin, John McEnroy.

== Thermal Pool ==
One of the park primary attractions is pool with naturally brown iron-rich thermal water at a temperature around 37 °C. It was built by Thomas Hickling in 1780 and enlarged in 1935 The pool features stone carvings and is surrounded by a ring of araucaria trees. Bathing is allowed, but requires a longer shower afterwards.

== Tourist attraction ==
Due to it special beauty Park is considered a "Romantic Botanical Garden". It is "must see" tourist attraction.
