= Jardim Botânico do Porto =

Botanic garden in Portugal

- Porto Botanical Garden
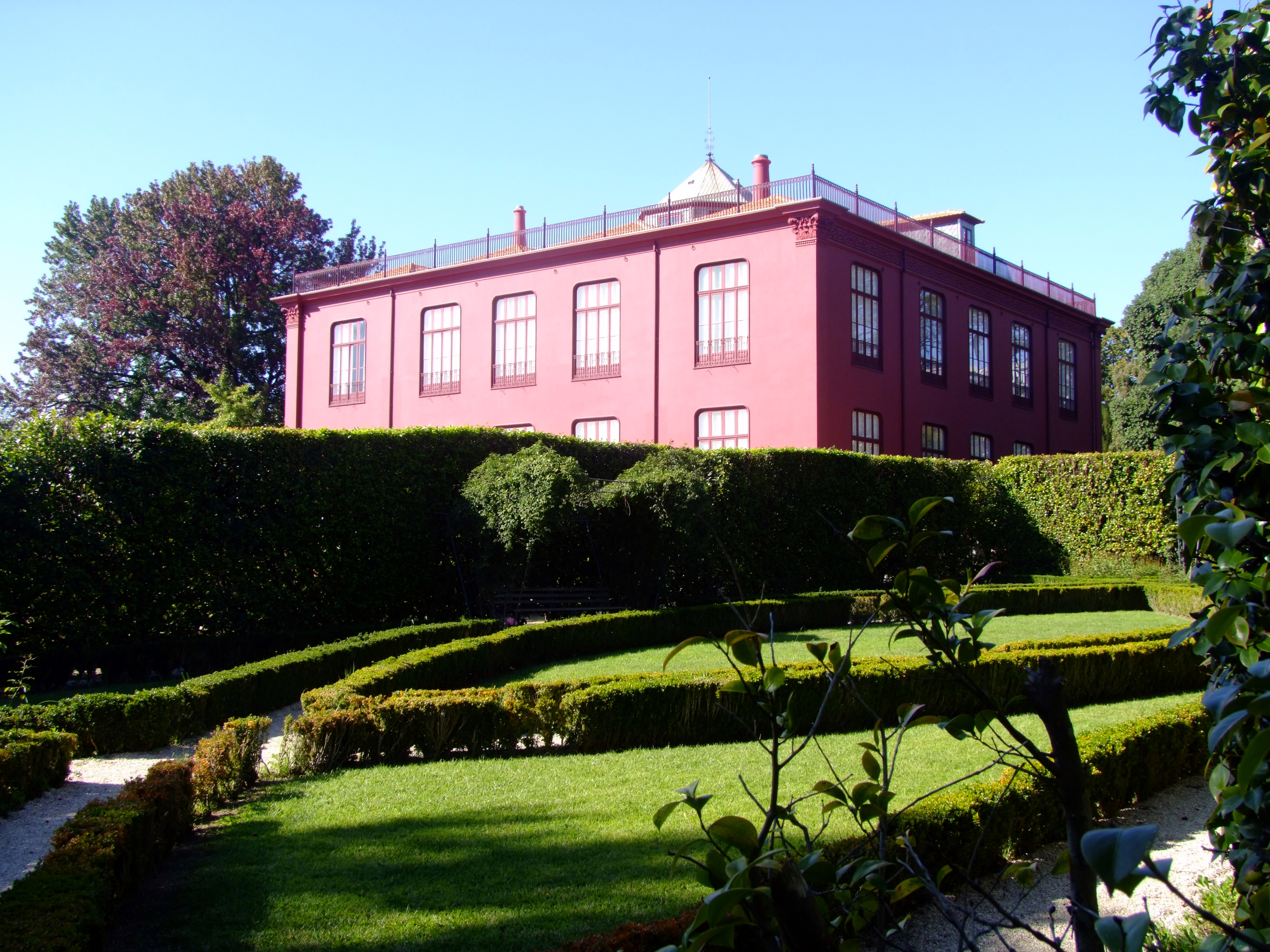
- View of the Porto Botanical Garden.
- Interactive map of Jardim Botânico do Porto
- Type: Botanical garden
- Location: Rua do Campo Alegre 1191, Porto, Portugal
- Coordinates: 41.1536°N 8.6426°W
- Opened: 1951
- Status: Open year round
- Website: Official website

The Porto Botanical Garden (Portuguese: Jardim Botânico do Porto) is a botanical garden located in the gardens of the Campo Alegre Estate (Quinta do Campo Alegre) or Andresen House, in Porto, Portugal. Since 2015, it has been a part of the Museum of Natural History and Science of University of Porto (MHNC-UP).

In recognition of its conservation efforts and botanical significance, the garden received multiple international distinctions. In 2020, it was designated an International Camellia Garden of Excellence by the International Camellia Society. Additionally, since 2019, it has been awarded the Green Flag Award annually by Keep Britain Tidy, acknowledging the garden's value, conservation, and the quality of its maintenance plan.

The current head of the Botanical Garden is the landscape architect Teresa Andresen, a descendant of the former owners of the estate, with Professors Arnaldo Rozeira, Roberto Salema and Barreto Caldas da Costa preceding her.

== History ==
The origins of the Jardim Botânico do Porto as an institution date back to the 19th century, initially linked to the Academia Politécnica, the predecessor of the University of Porto. The first botanical garden in the city was established by decree in 1837, but its existence was short-lived. A more permanent site was designated in 1852 near the former Convent of the Carmelites, though development only began in 1865. However, by the early 20th century, the land was sold, and the city lacked a dedicated botanical garden for several decades.

Alongside the garden, the Herbarium of the University of Porto was founded in 1892 as part of the Academia Politécnica. Spearheaded by botanist Gonçalo Sampaio, the herbarium has grown into a significant collection, now housed within MHNC-UP. It includes an estimated 120,000 specimens of vascular plants, bryophytes, lichens, fungi, and algae, as well as historical botanical documents, illustrations, and maps.

=== The Campo Alegre estate ===
Prior to the 19th century, the Campo Alegre Estate was a property owned by the Order of Christ, named Quinta Grande (Large Estate). In 1802, the property was purchased by Jean Pierre Salabert, also known as João Salabert, a Frenchman who may have been either a hatmaker or a doctor. During his time, the property started being called Quinta Grande do Salabert and he expanded it by acquiring adjacent plots of land. However, his estate was confiscated by the State in 1817, following the Peninsular War, due to suspicions of conspiracy against the state and liberal ideas. By the time of the Liberal Revolution in 1820, the property had passed into the hands of João José da Costa.

In 1875, João Silva Monteiro, a Brazilian emigrant, acquired the estate together with Arnaldo Ribeiro Barbosa. They undertook the construction of a small palace (nowadays known as the Andresen house) and started the surrounding gardens, demolishing the previous house. By then the estate had acquired its modern name.

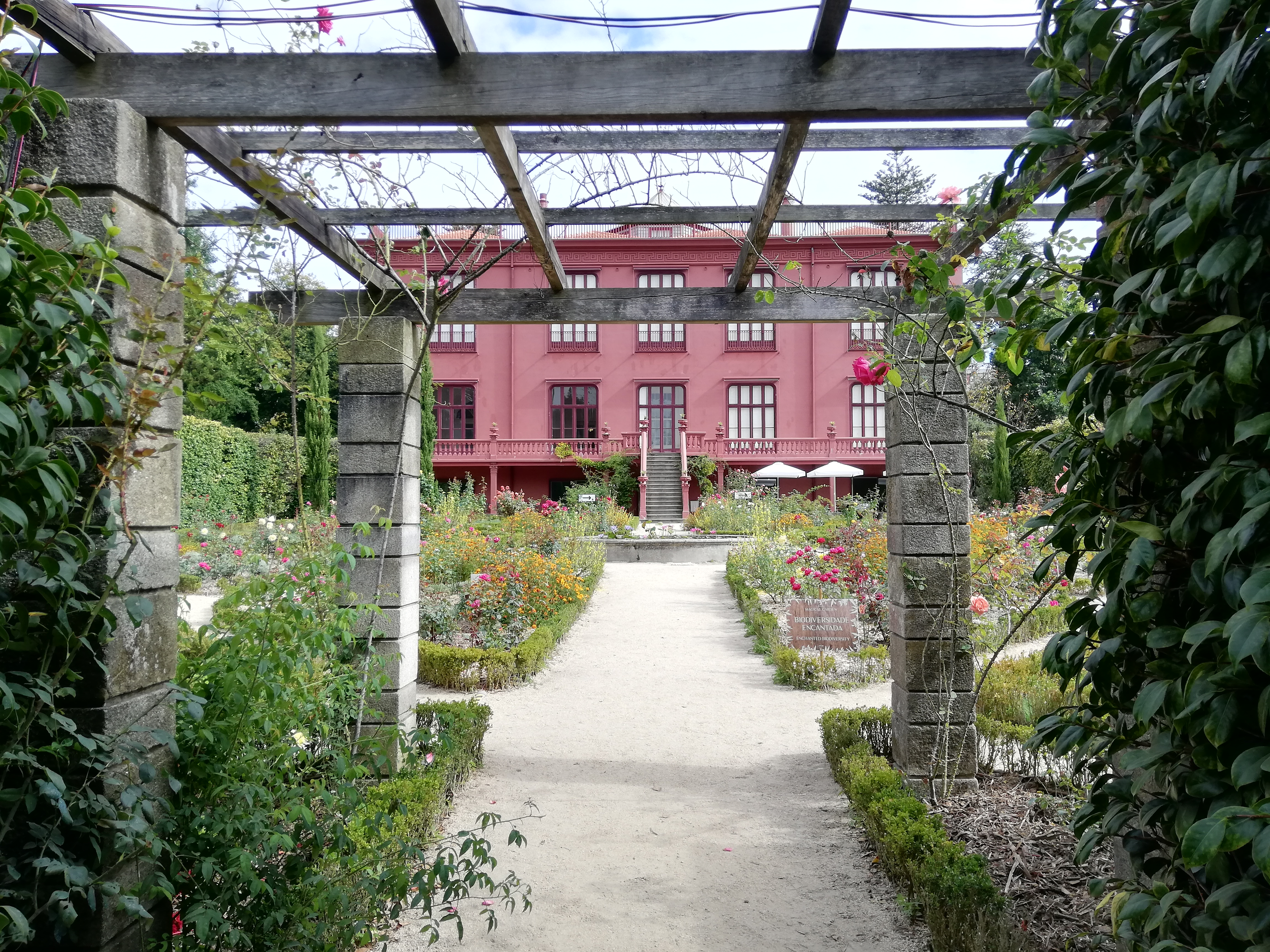
Casa Andresen from the south

In 1895, João Henrique Andresen, son of the Port wine merchant João Andresen, and his wife, Joana Lehmann Andresen, acquired the Quinta do Campo Alegre and undertook extensive renovations to both the house and gardens. One of the most notable architectural changes was the addition of a reinforced concrete balcony and staircase on the south façade of the main house, a project designed by engineer António da Silva, who was also responsible for the construction of several palaces for Porto’s bourgeoisie.

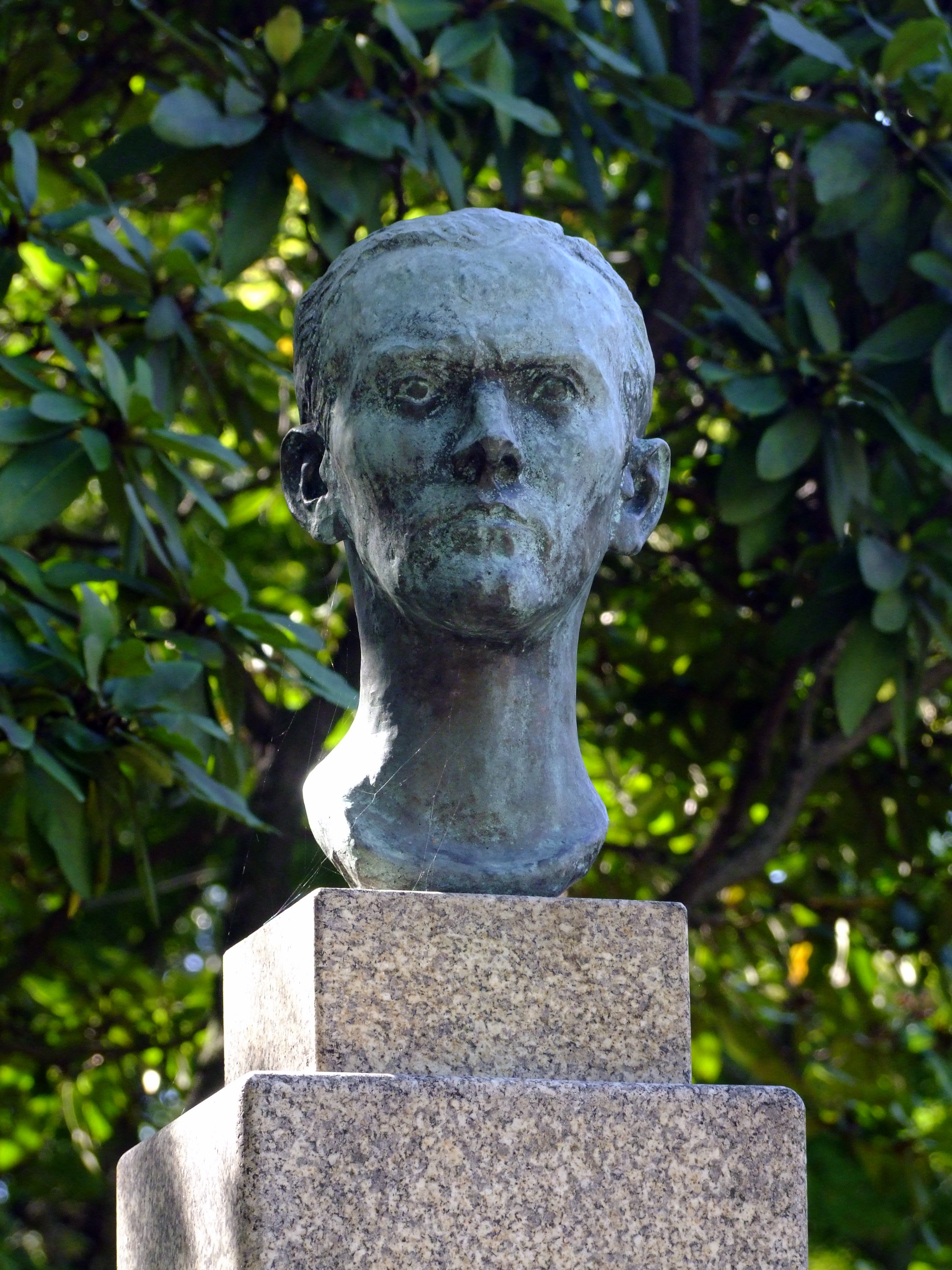
Bust of Ruben A.

The couple also made significant modifications to the estate’s landscape. Joana Lehmann Andresen personally designed the J Letter Garden (Jardim dos Jotas) and the Rose Garden, two ornamental spaces that remain defining features of the site. The camellia hedges that enclose these gardens were sourced from Alfredo Moreira da Silva, a prominent horticulturist and nurseryman from Porto. Additionally, the estate included a tennis court, which has since been transformed into the Schist Garden.

Two of João and Joana's grandchildren would later become famous writers: Sophia de Mello Breyner and Ruben A.. They spent many years of their childhood in this estate and it served as inspiration for their works.

=== The modern botanical gardens ===
By the early 20th century, the Faculty of Sciences at the University of Porto faced significant space constraints for teaching and research. During a University Senate meeting on August 9, 1937, Américo Pires de Lima, then head of the Faculty, proposed the acquisition of the Quinta do Campo Alegre estate to establish a botanical garden, an astronomical observatory, and a sports field. Despite the approval from the government, the purchase faced delays and complications, partly due to urban development plans, including the construction of access routes to the Arrábida Bridge.

Nevertheless, persistent advocacy from the Faculty of Sciences emphasized the importance of acquiring the estate not only for educational purposes but also for providing university students with much-needed recreational facilities. In 1944, Rector António José Adriano Rodrigues formally communicated to the Mayor of Porto the numerous benefits of the estate acquisition.

Finally, in 1949, the Portuguese government purchased the estate, which had been on the market since 1937, and by January 7, 1950, the General Directorate of the Treasury authorized its assignment to the University of Porto. In 1951, the Botanical Garden was started under the management of the Faculty of Sciences of the University of Porto. Between 1952 and 1967, German landscape architect Franz Karl Koepp redesigned the gardens for public use.

During the 1960s, the construction of the Arrábida Bridge and its access roads significantly reduced the Botanical Garden’s area by 8 hectares (20 acres) of its 12 hectares (30 acres). In compensation, the gardens of the adjacent Burmester House, with 1.8 hectares (4.4 acres), were given to the Botanical Garden in 1957.

In 1983, the botanical garden closed to the public, due to its state of disrepair, reopening in 2001, following some interventions. The gardens closed again between July 2006 and May 2007 for restoration works involving the paths, watering system and electrical systems. In 2008, the Department of Botany was relocated, and the Casa Andresen was remodeled by architect Nuno Valentim to host the exhibition "The Evolution of Darwin," marking the centenary celebrations of the University of Porto.

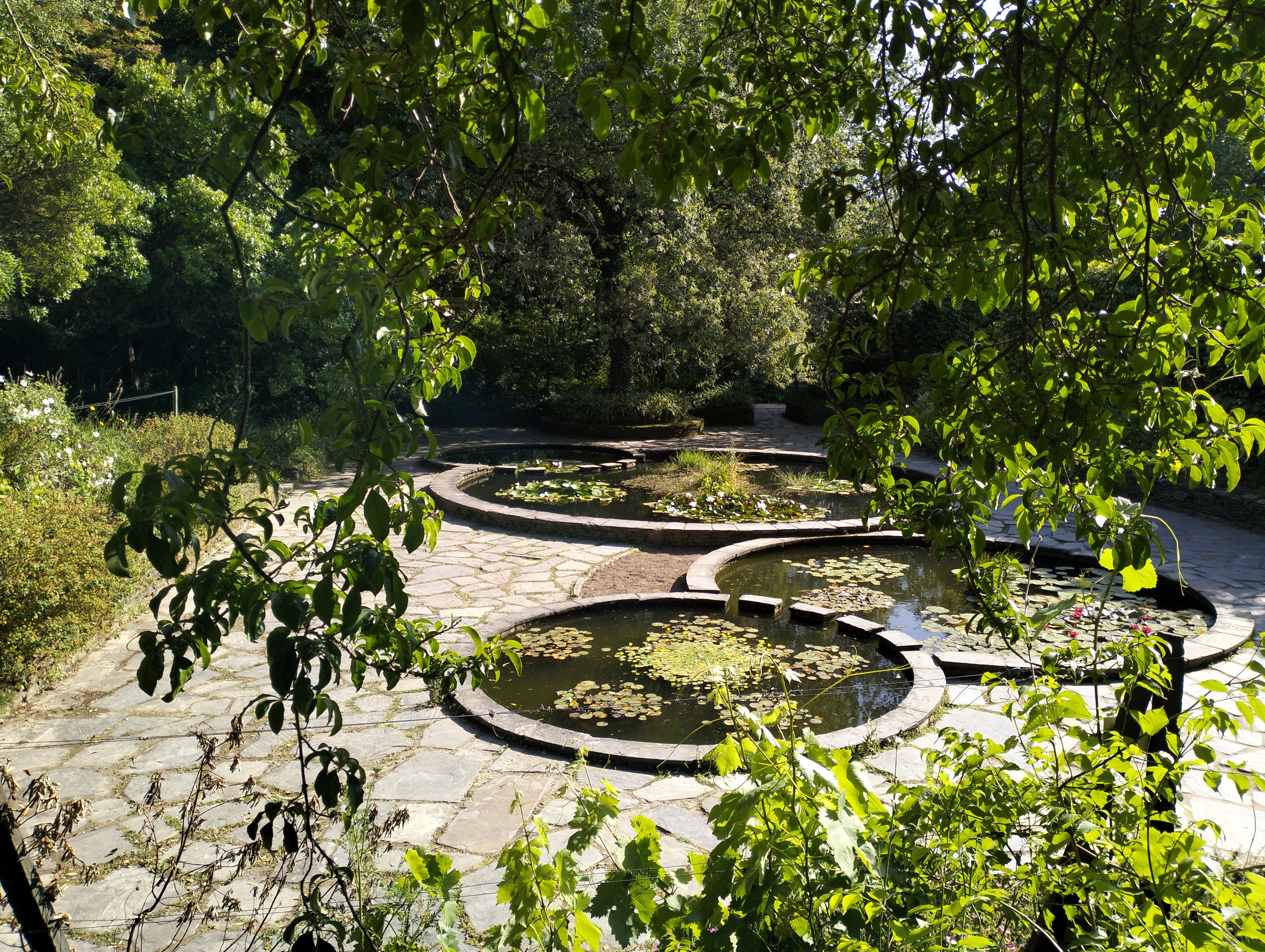
Ponds at the western end

In 2010, the Botanical Garden was integrated into the Natural History Museum of the University of Porto, and in 2015, it became a unit of the Natural History and Science Museum of the University of Porto. Also in 2015, Casa Salabert (a smaller house west of Casa Andresen) was converted into the e-Learning Café Botânico by a team led by Nuno Valentim. The project removed later additions and restored the house to its 1925 form while adapting it into study spaces with modern infrastructure. The renovation earned several awards, including the National Rehabilitation Prize (2016), an Honorable Mention in the João de Almada Prize (2017), and recognition in the Mies van der Rohe Award (2019) and International Architecture Awards (2019). Further, on June 30, 2017, the Hall of Biodiversity– Ciência Viva Center was inaugurated in Casa Andresen.

== Composition ==
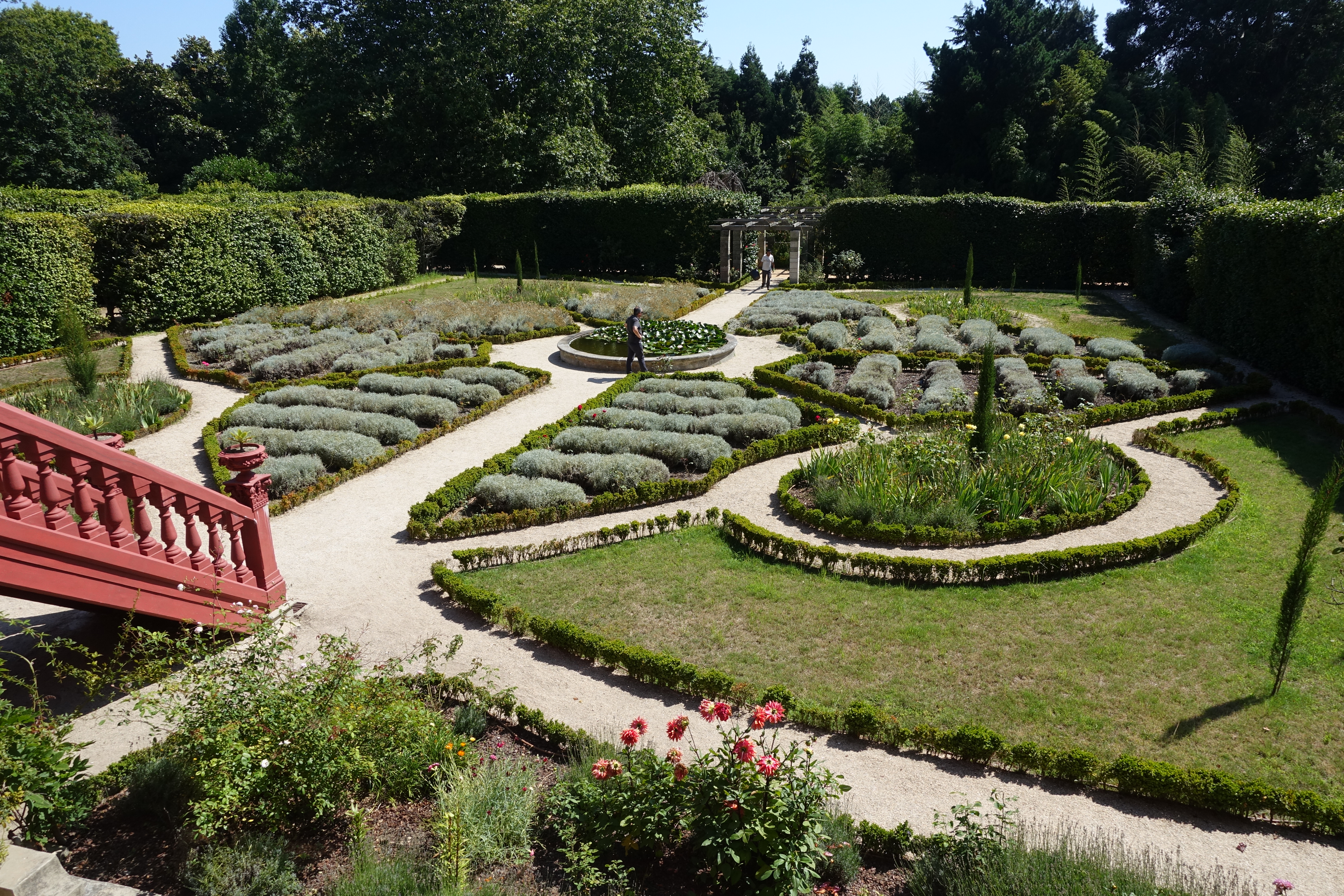
Gardens in front of Andresen house

The Botanical Garden currently includes:

- The Andresen and Salabert houses,
- An historical garden with three distinct parts (the Rose Garden, the J Letter Garden and the Fish Garden), separated by Camellia japonica hedges,
- Two ponds, one of which with waterlilies,
- Greenhouses, including one dedicated to cacti and other succulent plants and another to tropical plants,
- A cacti and succulent plant collection, featuring many Opuntia, Euphorbia, Agave and Aloe species,
- An arboretum, including a conifer collection, several centenary trees and a specimen of Ginkgo biloba planted by Arnaldo Rozeira.
