= Madeira Botanical Garden =

Botanical garden in Funchal, Madeira

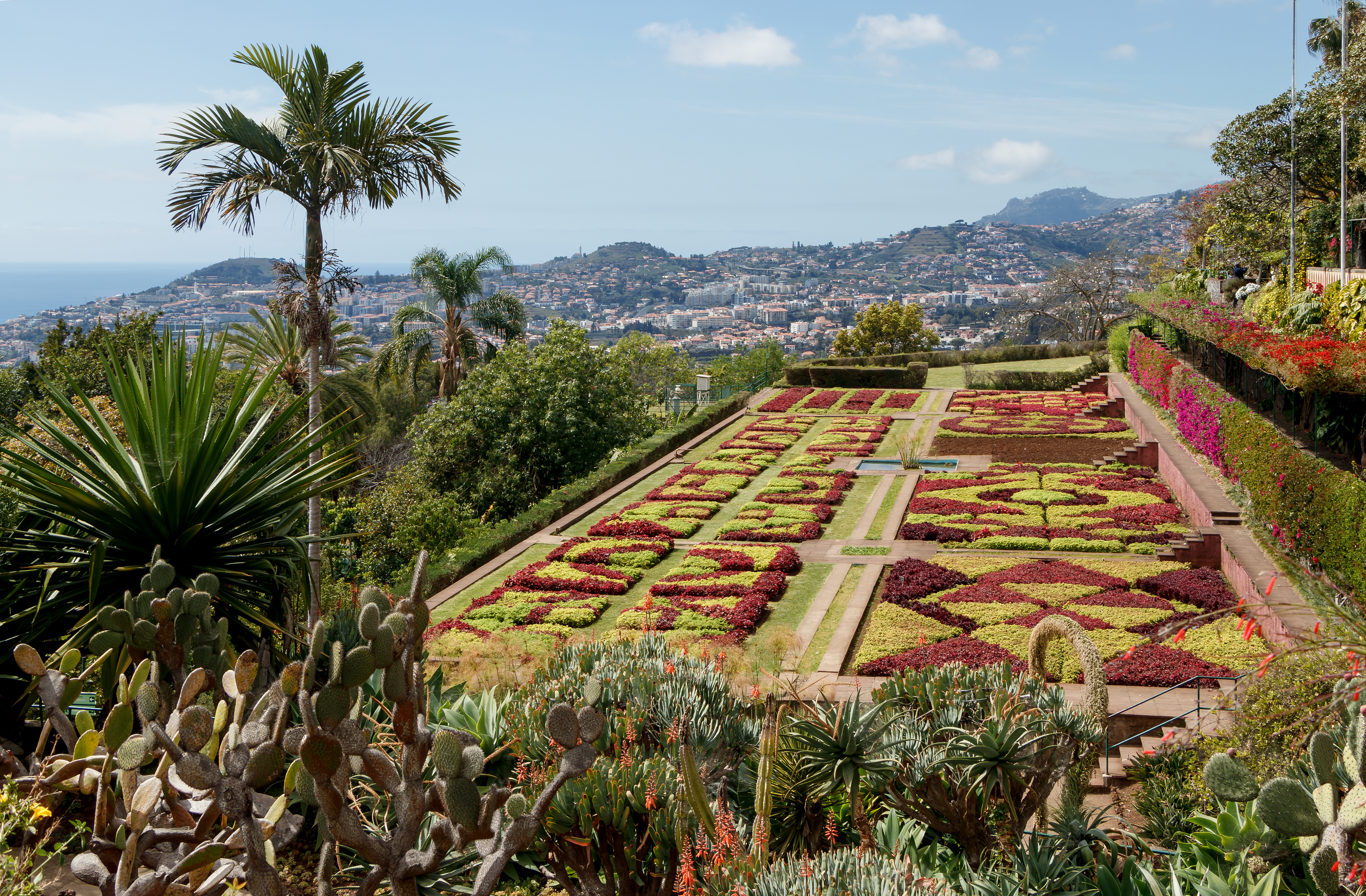
- Madeira Botanical Garden

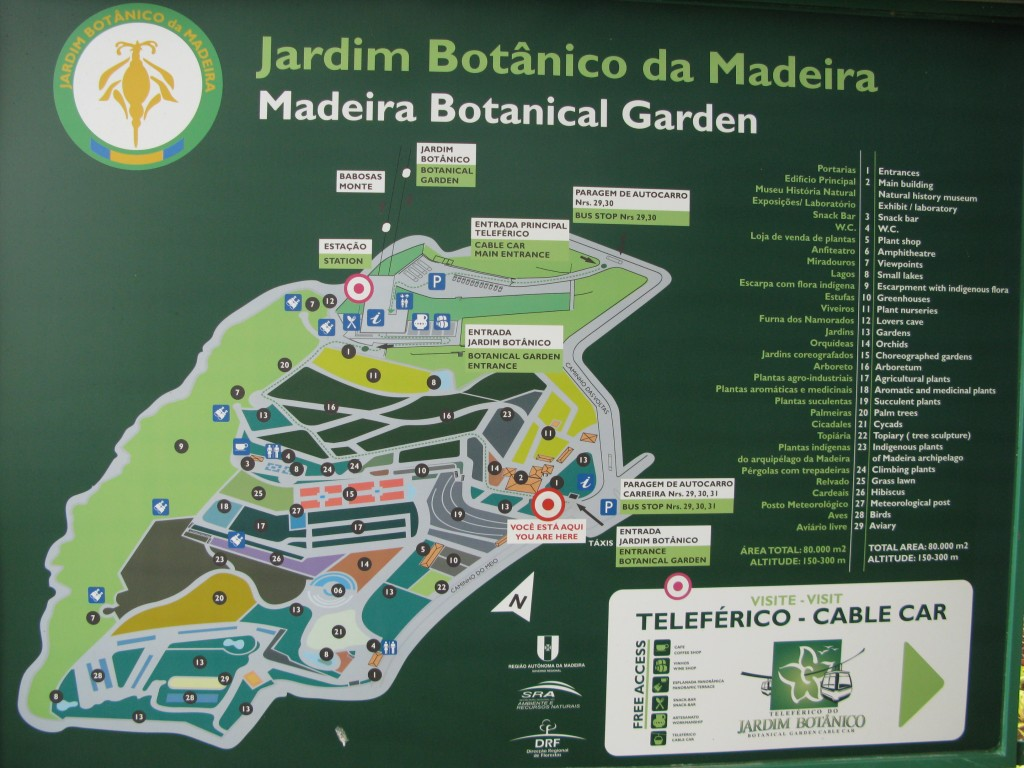
- Type: Botanical
- Location: Santa Maria Maior, Funchal - Madeira
- Coordinates: 32.6622°N 16.8958°W
- Area: 8 hectares (20 acres)
- Opened: 1960
- Visitors: more than 345000 thousand per year
- Website: ifcn.madeira.gov.pt

Madeira Botanical Garden (Portuguese: Jardim Botânico da Madeira) is a botanical garden in Funchal, Madeira, opened to the public in 1960. The area was previously part of an estate belonging to the family of William Reid, founder of Reid's Hotel.

== Collections ==
The garden is divided into six areas:

- Madeiran indigenous and endemic species
- arboretum (collection of trees and shrubs)
- succulent plants
- agro-industrial plants
- medicinal and aromatic plants
- palm trees and cycads

Arboretum is located in the north part of the Garden, succulent plants in centre-east, agro-industrial plants in the center, palm trees in the south. Remaining parts of the Garden are covered with flowers other flora species.

The gardens include a bird park (Louro Bird Park) and a three-room Natural History Museum. There is a collection of around 300 exotic birds, including Blue and Yellow Macaw, Cockatoo, Parrots and Lory in the exotic bird park.

== See also ==
- List of botanical gardens#Portugal
- Category:Flora of Madeira

== Gallery ==
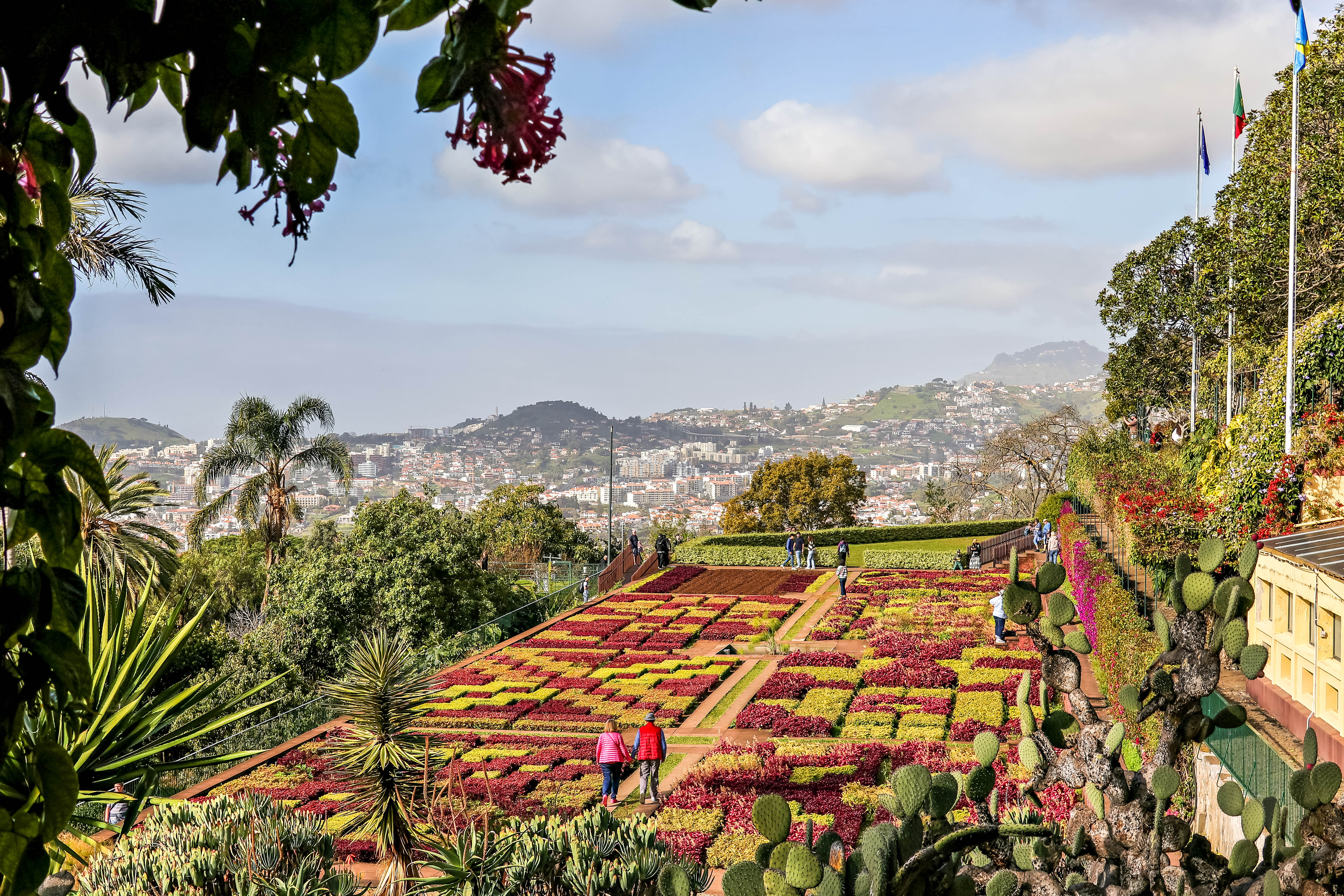
Carpet bedding

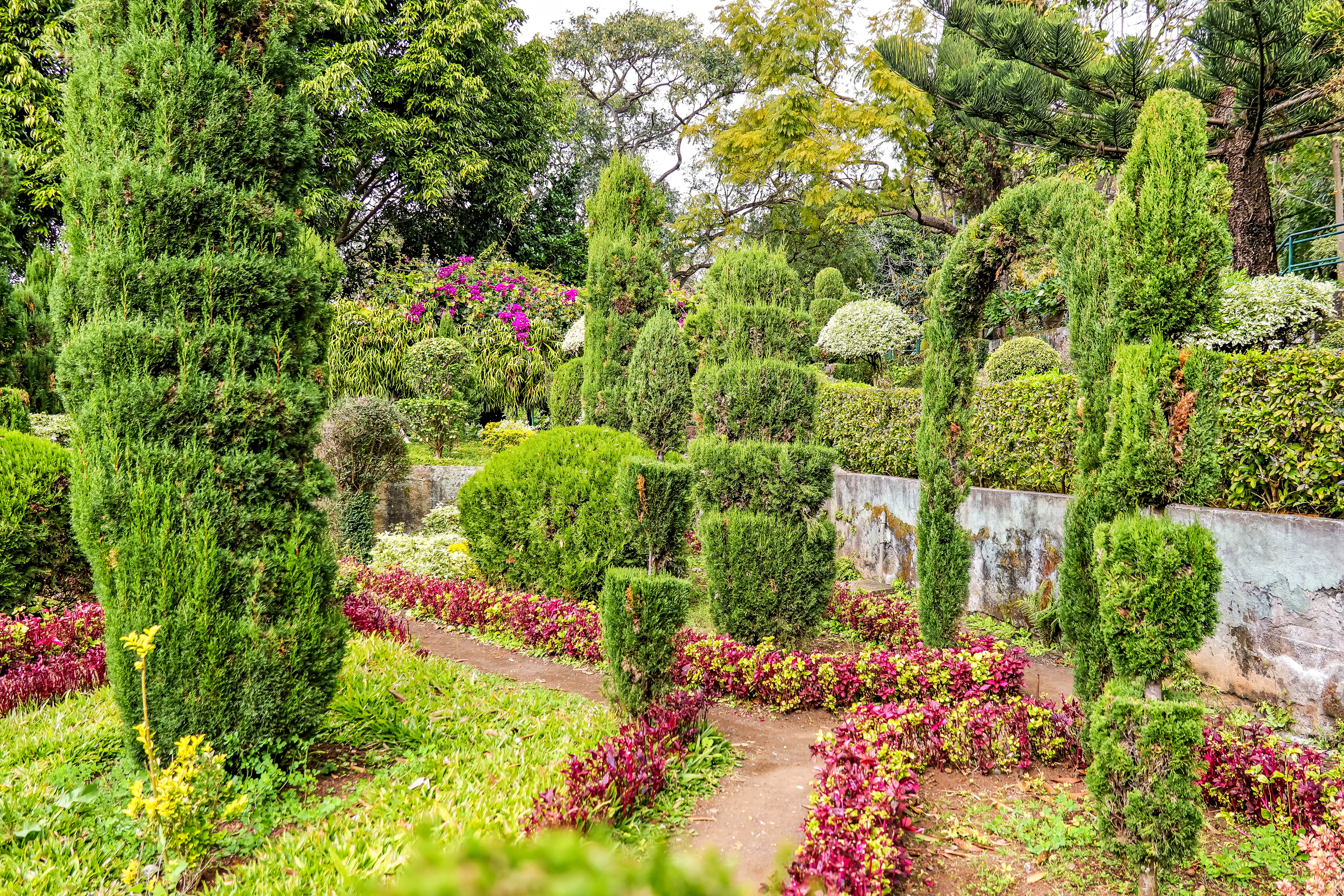
Topiary

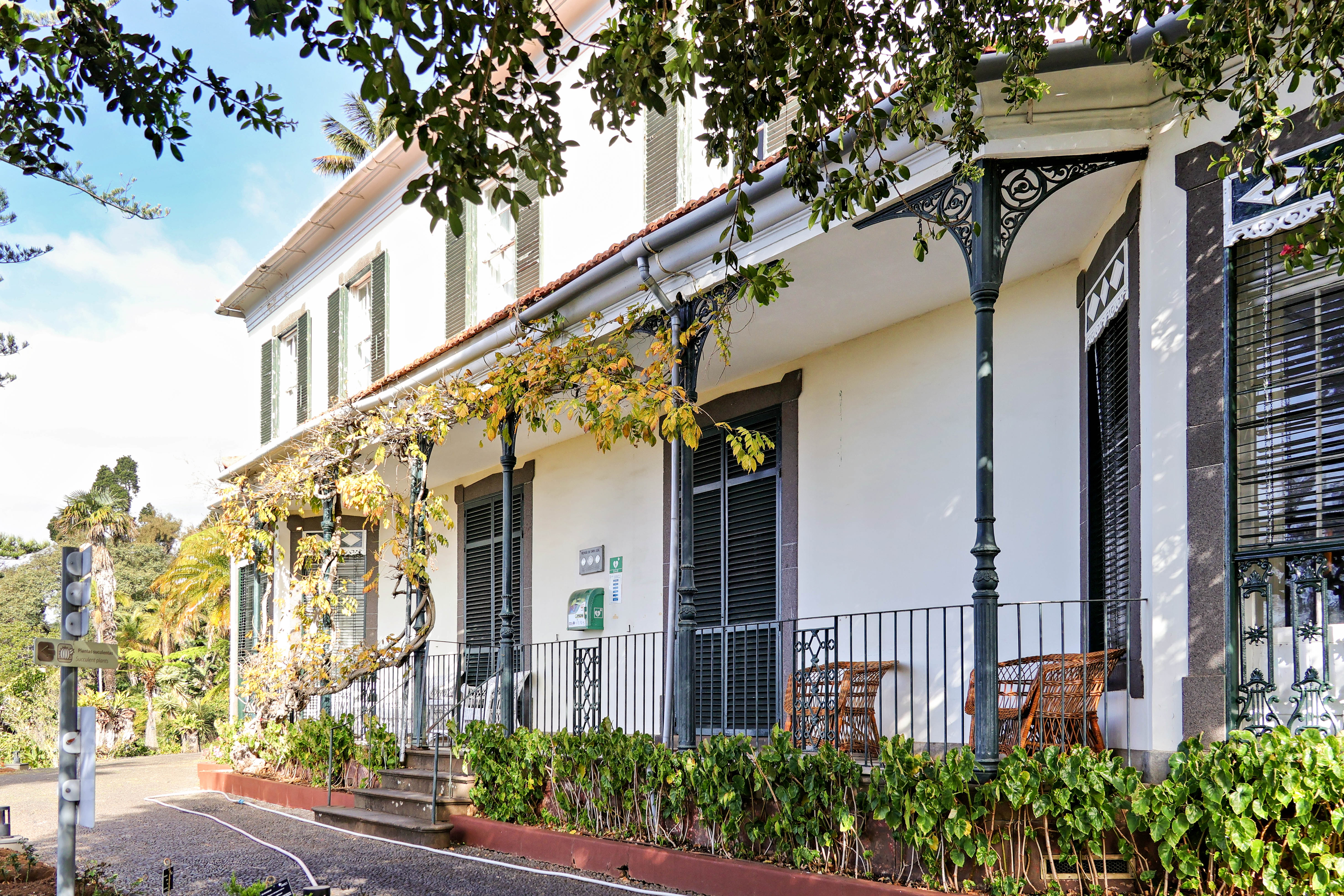
Natural History Museum

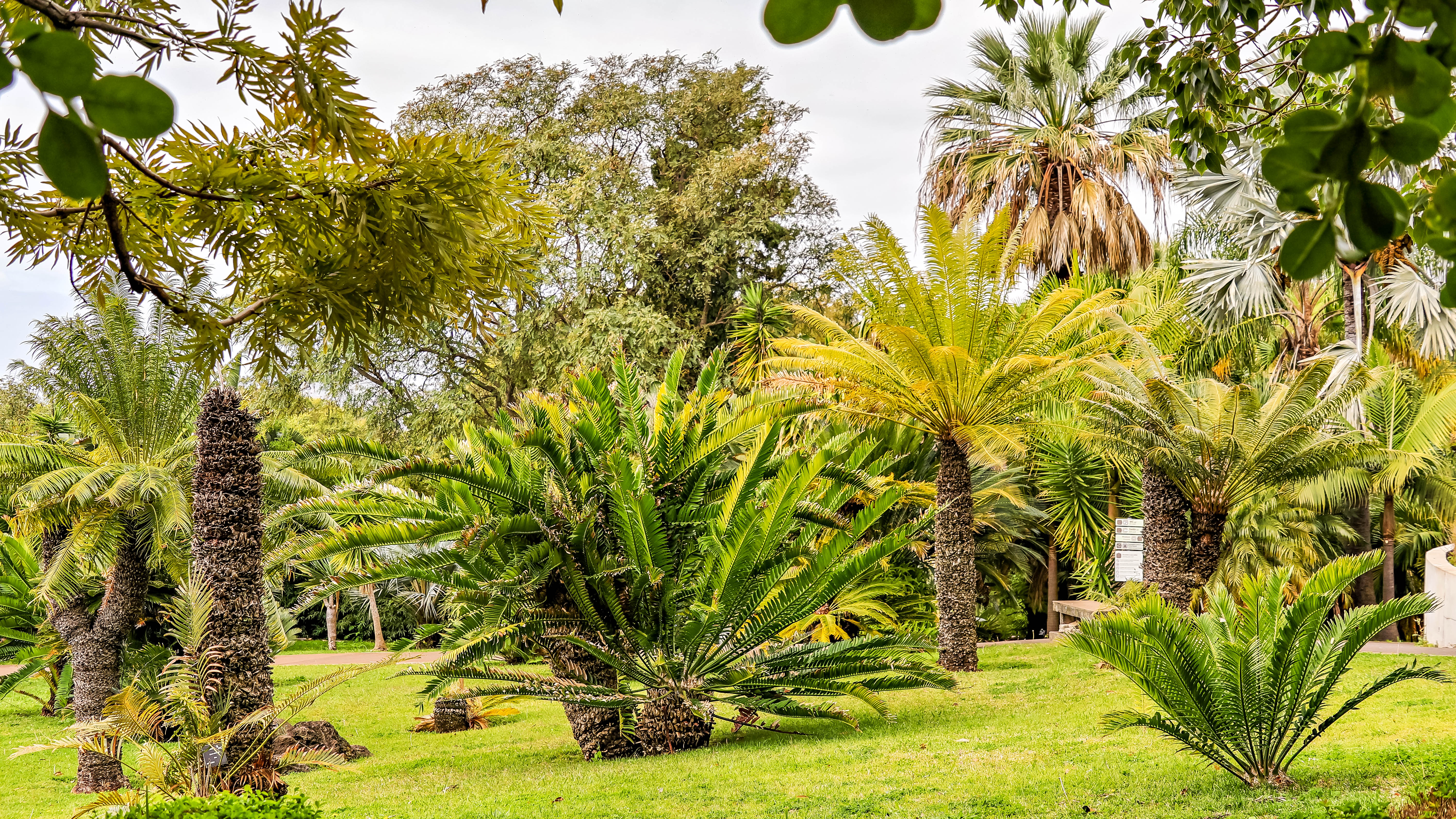
cycads

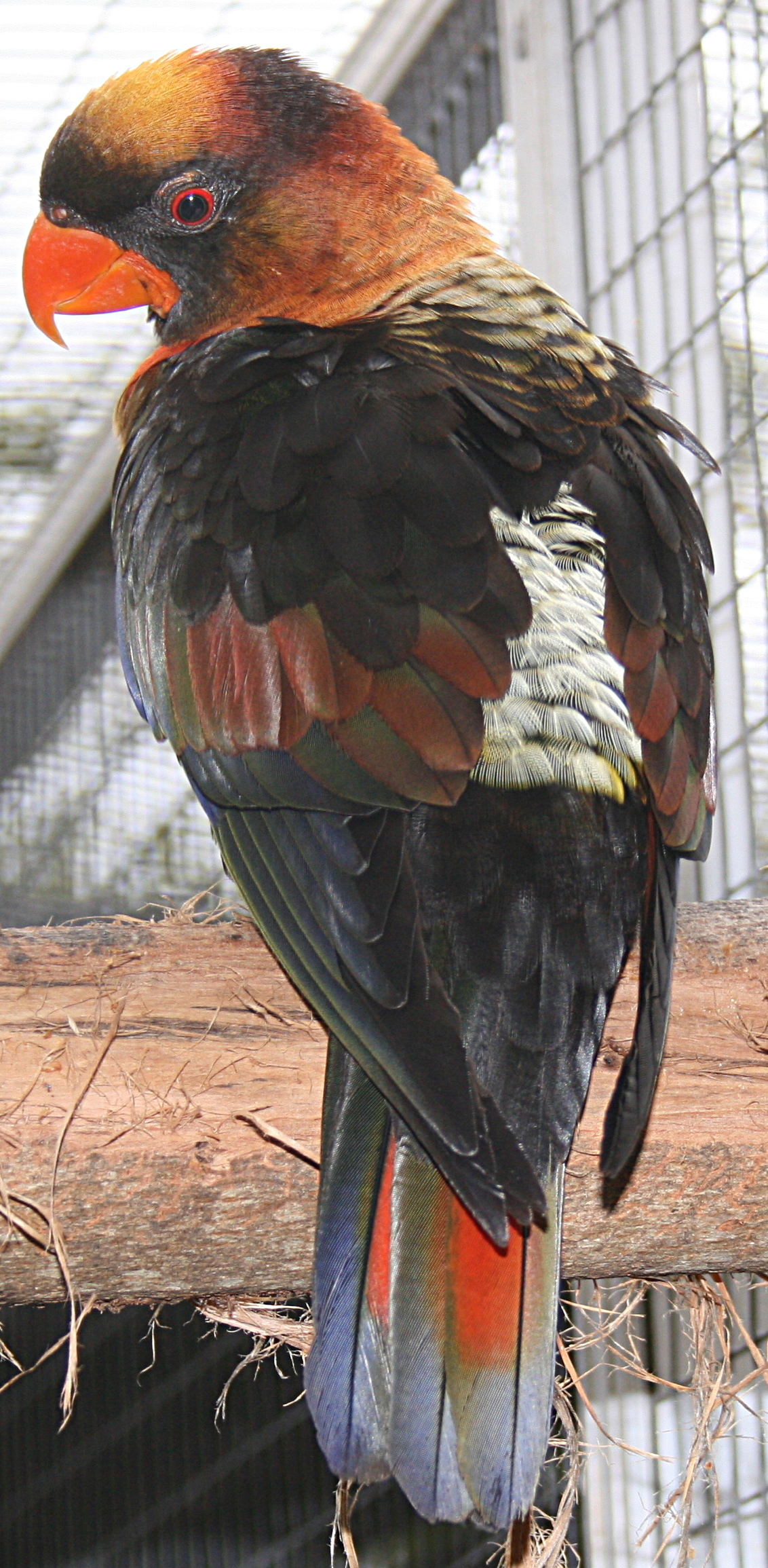
Louro Bird Park (Pseudeos fuscata)

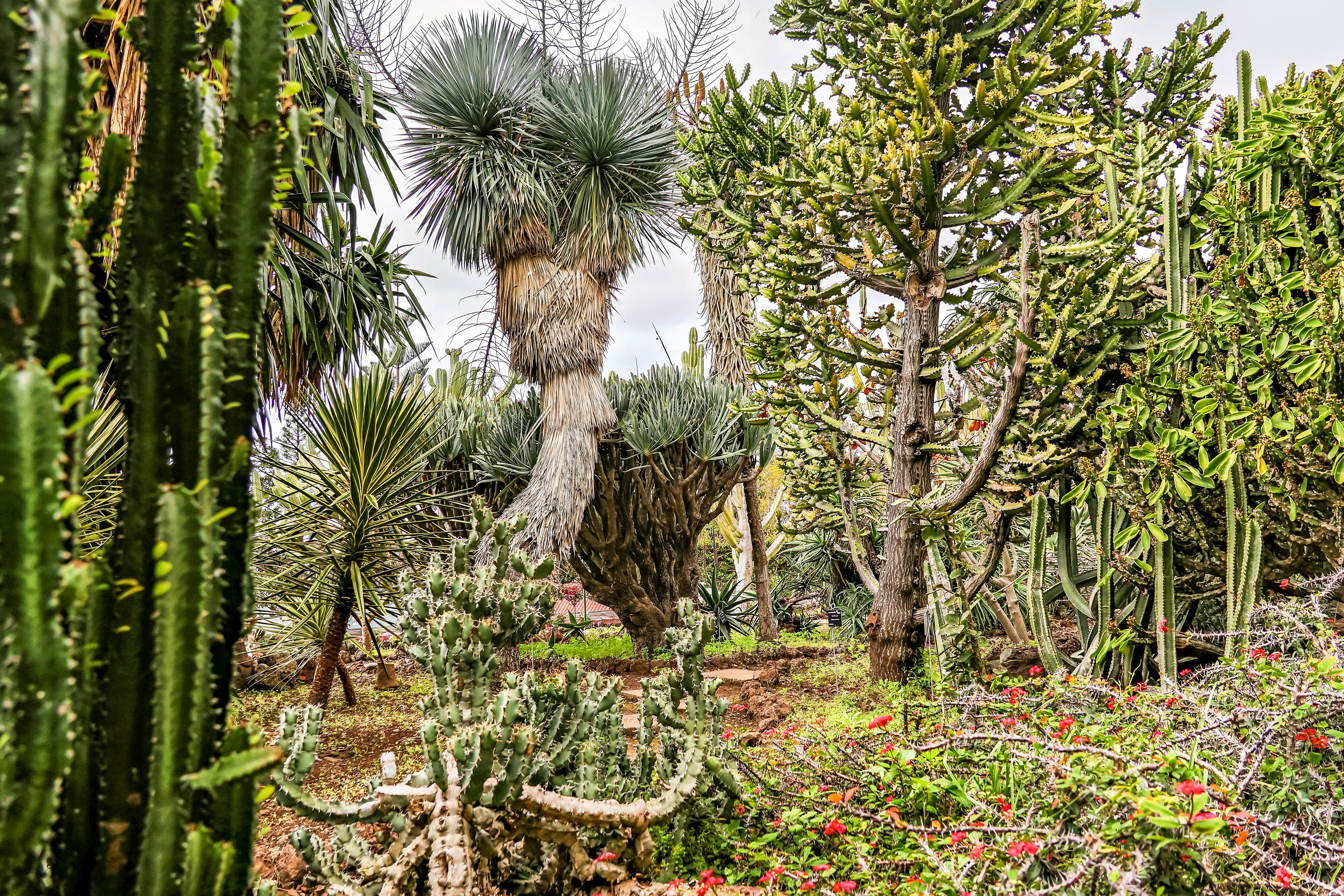
succulent plants

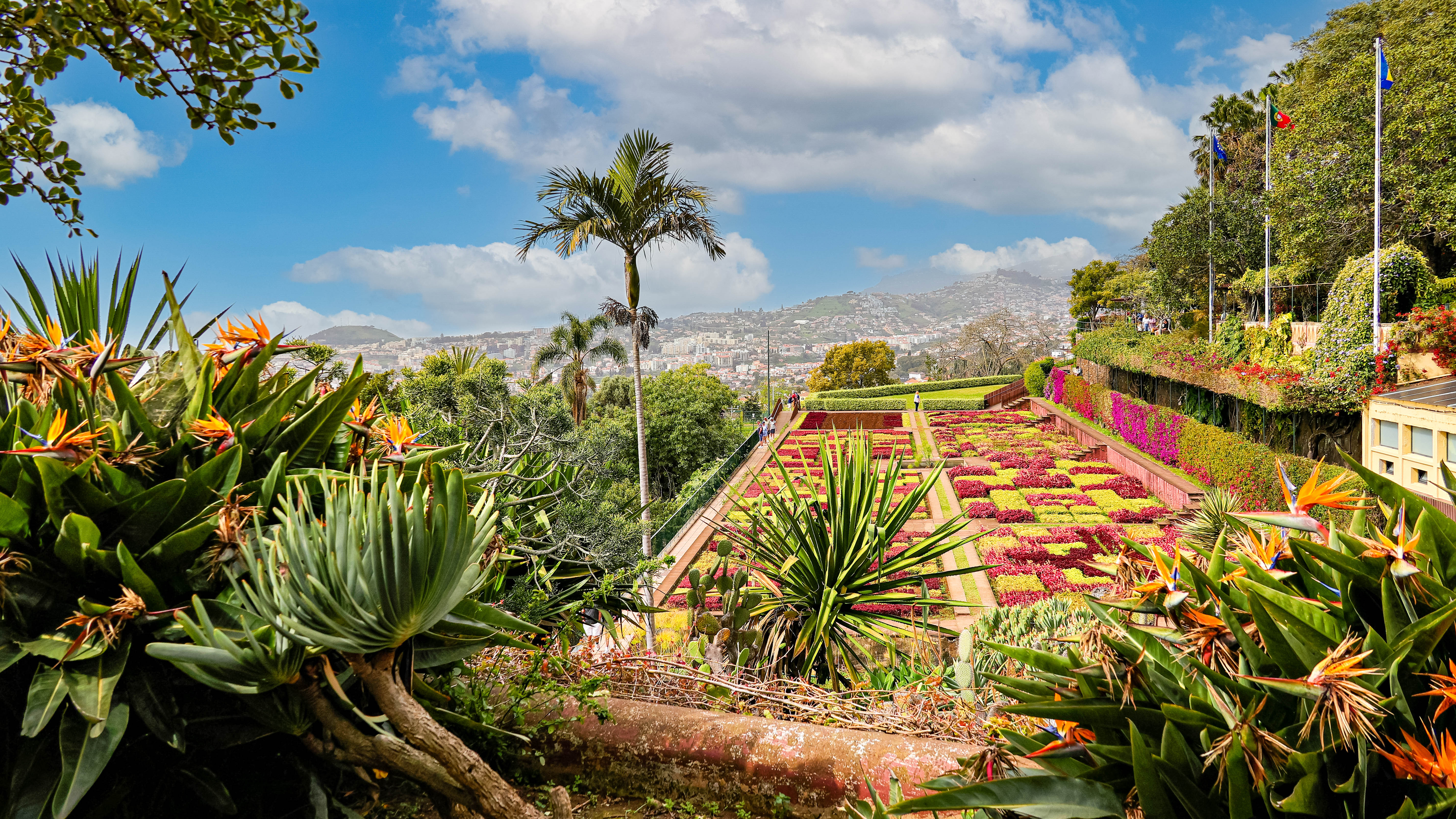
Strelitzias (in the foreground)

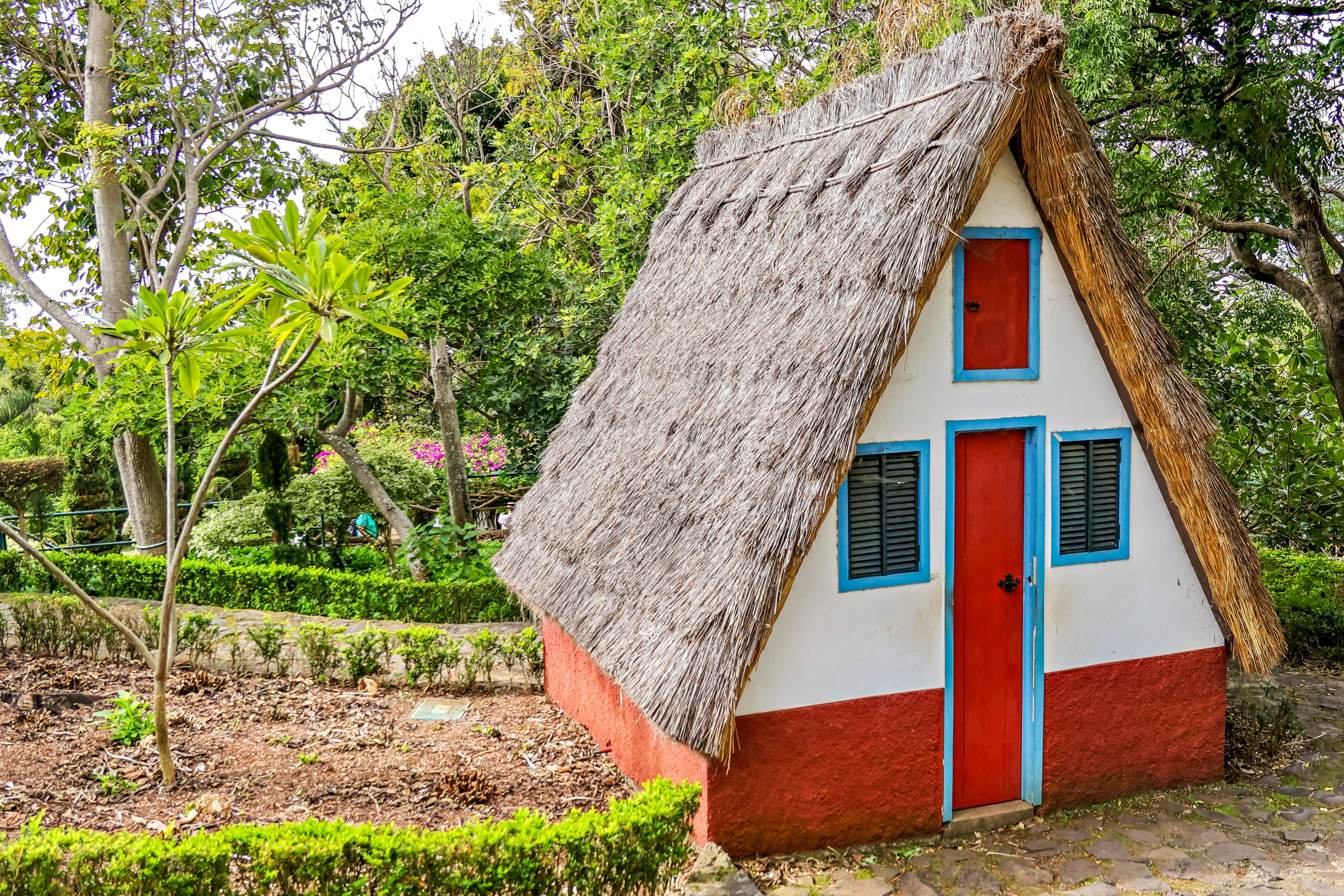
Typical cottage of Santana

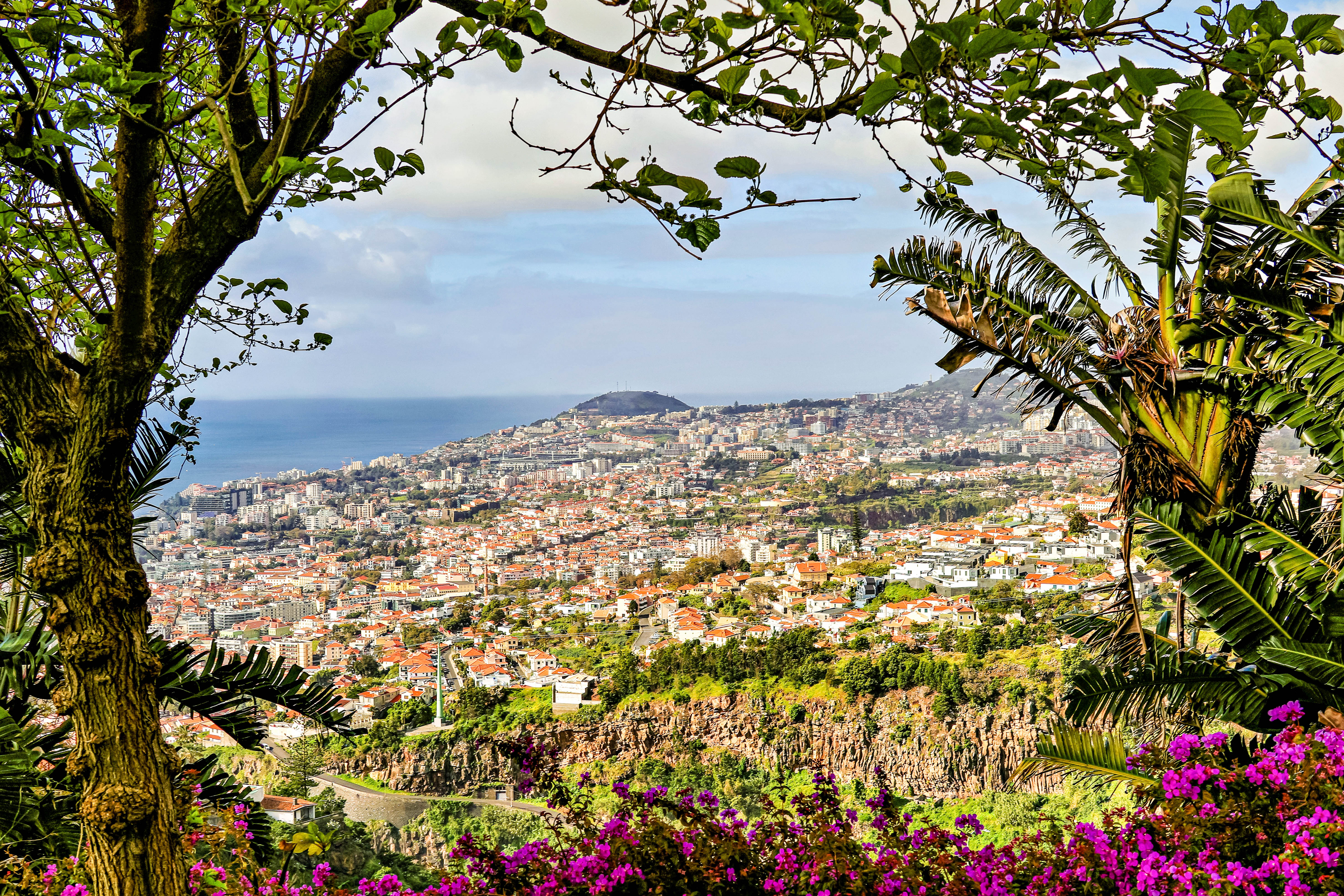
View of Funchal from Jardim Botânico
