= 2026–27 Campeonato Nacional de Rugby Divisão de Honra =

Portugal rugby union season

2026–27 SUPER XV
- Countries: Portugal
- Number of teams: 12

Official website
- www.fpr.pt

The Campeonato Nacional de Rugby Divisão de Honra (more commonly known as the Divisão de Honra) is Portugal's top-level professional men's rugby union competition. The Divisão de Honra Championships are organized by the Federação Portuguesa de Rugby (Portuguese Rugby Federation) and currently consists of 12 teams. The last placed team in the competition is relegated at the end of the season to the Campeonato Nacional de Rugby I Divisão (Portugal's second level of men's rugby union) with one team from the second-tier competition promoted to the Divisão de Honra.

Location of teams in 2026–27 SUPER XV

== Format ==
The championship is divided into two phases:

- Regular Phase
- Final Phase

Regular Phase

The Divisão de Honra will be disputed by 12 (twelve) teams:

- 11 teams from the Divisão de Honra of the 2025/2026;
- 1 team promoted from the national championship of the 1st division.

In the Regular Phase, all teams play against each other, in a single round. At the end of this Phase, the teams classified from 1st to 8th place qualify for the Final season. The teams classified from 9th to 12th place will compete in a maintenance play-off.

Final Phase

In the Final Phase, two Groups of four (4) teams are formed, which play in an all-against-all system, in a single round. The teams ranked 1st and 2nd in each group qualify for the semi-finals.

The final will be played between the two teams that won the semi-finals. The teams that won in the semi-finals compete in one game against each other to award 3rd/4th place. The winning team in the final will be declared the national champion of the Campeonato Português de Rugby (2026/27).

A maintenance play-off to be played by the four teams classified between 9th and 12th place in the Regular Phase, in a free-for-all system, in two rounds (6 matches). The team that finishes last in this play-off will be relegated to the National Championship of the I Division of the following season.

== Teams ==
Team	Manager	Captain	Stadium	Capacity
Académica	(Portugal) Rui Carvoeira		Estádio Municipal Sérgio Conceição	2500
Agronomia	(Argentina) Diego Vidal	(Portugal) Francisco Cabral	Tapada da Ajuda	500
Belenenses	(Portugal) João Mirra	(Portugal) Tomás Sequeira	Belém Rugby Park	500
Benfica	(Portugal) António Aguilar	(Portugal) Tomás Picado	Estádio Universitário de Lisboa / Campo nº2 - Lisbon University	8000 / 1000
Cascais	(Argentina) Gabriel Ascárate		Campo da Guia	1000
CDUL	(New Zealand) Kane Hancy	(Portugal) Tomás Appleton	Estádio Universitário de Lisboa	8000
CDUP	(Portugal) João Bello		Estádio Universitário do Porto	1500
Direito	(Portugal) Gonçalo Malheiro	(Portugal) João Granate	Complexo Desportivo Miguel Nobre Ferreira	2500
CR Setúbal	(Portugal) João Terlim		Algodeia Rugby Park	500
RC Santarém	(Portugal) Pedro Vital		CNEMA / Escola Prática de Cavalaria	2500 / 500
São Miguel	(Portugal) João Uva		Bulldog Rugby Park	800
C. R. Técnico	(New Zealand) Travis Church		Campo das Olaias	800

== Squads 2026/27 ==
Squads are ordered by the last classification of the league. According to Portuguese Rugby Federation and official website of the competition.

The Benfica squad for the 2026–27 Campeonato Nacional de Rugby season
**Props**: (Canada) **Samuel Miller**; (Colombia) **David Henao**; (Samoa) **Brook To'omalatai**; (Argentina) Cristian Antoncic; (Portugal) José Maria Pereira; (Portugal) Serafim Djassi; (Portugal) Eduardo Gomes; **Hookers**: (South Africa) Jason Cornelius* ^{LUS}; (Portugal) Isaías Camará; (Portugal) Pedro Gouveia; **Locks**: (Portugal) **Francisco Almeida** ^{LUS}; (Italy) Giuseppe Piacenza; (South Africa) Simão Dionisio*; (Portugal) Eurico Chichorro; (Portugal) Afonso Boavida	**Backrow**: (Portugal) **Frederico Couto** ^{LUS}; (Portugal) Manuel Fati ^{LUS}; (Argentina) Omar Gutiérrez; (Portugal) Tomás Picado; (Portugal) Pedro Ismael Tavares; (Portugal) Rui Duarte; (Portugal) João Ferreira; (Brazil) Caio Almeida; **Scrum-halves**: (Portugal) **António Campos** ^{LUS}; (Ireland) Elliott Ryan*; **Fly-halves**: (Portugal) **João Lima**; (Luxembourg) **Fintan Lawlor**; (Argentina) Ramiro Pérez Gutiérrez	**Three-quarters**: (Portugal) **José Lima** ^{LUS}; (Portugal) **Guilherme Vasconcelos** ^{LUS}; (Argentina) Juan Pablo Castro; (Argentina) Leopoldo Herrera; (New Zealand) Hayden Hann*; (Guinea-Bissau) Felisbelo Vieira*; (Portugal) Edgar Monteiro; (Portugal) Diego Caeiro; (Portugal) Rodrigo Sampaio; (Portugal) Zé Miguel Carvalho; **Fullbacks**: (Portugal) **José Rodrigues**; (Portugal) António Alves
(c) denotes the team captain: **Bold** denotes internationally capped players.; **LUS** denotes Lusitanos capped players.; ^{*} denotes players qualified to play for Portugal on residency or dual nationality.

The Cascais squad for the 2026–27 Campeonato Nacional de Rugby season
**Props**: (Portugal) **José Lavos** ^{LUS}; (Argentina) Nicolas Griffiths ^{LUS}; (Argentina) José Martinez; (Argentina) Ignácio Urueña; (Portugal) Duarte Conde ^{LUS}; **Hookers**: (Portugal) **Santiago Lopes** ^{LUS}; (Portugal) **Nuno Mascarenhas** ^{LUS}; **Locks**: (Uruguay) **Manuel Ardao**; (Portugal) **Boaventura Almeida** ^{LUS}; (Portugal) **Martim Belo** ^{LUS}; (Argentina) Israel Parnas; (Portugal) Alexandre Fonseca Rodrigues ^{LUS}; (Portugal) Manuel Barros ^{LUS}; (Portugal) António Carvalho Martins; (Portugal) Luis Graça	**Backrow**: (Portugal) Lourenço Durão ^{LUS}; (Portugal) Sebastião Petronilho; (Portugal) Gonçalo Carvalho; (Portugal) António Andrade; (Portugal) Manuel Soares; **Scrum-halves**: (Argentina) Rafael Iriarte; (England) Noah Nash; (Portugal) Duarte Cardoso ^{LUS}; (Portugal) Francisco Carmona Costa; (Portugal) Tomás Martins; **Fly-halves**: (Argentina) Santiago Jara	**Three-quarters**: (Portugal) **António Vidinha** ^{LUS}; (Portugal) **Francisco Vassalo**; (Northern Ireland) Maximilien Coutts* ^{LUS}; (Portugal) Vasco Durão ^{LUS}; (Portugal) Francisco C. Campos; (Portugal) José Villar Gomes; (Portugal) António Sousa; (Portugal) Luis Ferros; (Portugal) Duarte Tavares; (Portugal) Guilherme Taborda; (Portugal) Lucas Machado; **Fullbacks**: (Portugal) **Alfredo Almeida** ^{LUS}; (Portugal) Vasco Correia ^{LUS}; (Portugal) Francisco Pissarra; (Portugal) Henrique Matias
(c) denotes the team captain: **Bold** denotes internationally capped players.; **LUS** denotes Lusitanos capped players.; ^{*} denotes players qualified to play for Portugal on residency or dual nationality.

The Direito squad for the 2026–27 Campeonato Nacional de Rugby season
**Props**: (Portugal) **David Costa** ^{LUS}; (Portugal) **António Prim** ^{LUS}; (Portugal) **José Lupi**; (Portugal) **Luis Lopes**; (Portugal) **Afonso Tapadinhas**; (Portugal) André Bardziy ^{LUS}; (Argentina) Joaquín Blangetti; (Portugal) Lourenço Moita; (Portugal) João Pissarra; (Portugal) Leandro Nunes; **Hookers**: (Portugal) **Duarte Diniz** ^{LUS}; (Argentina) Fabian Contreras; **Locks**: (Portugal) **Duarte Torgal** ^{LUS}; (Portugal) **Pedro Ferreira** ^{LUS}; (Portugal) **Duarte Pedro Nunes** ^{LUS}; (Portugal) António Peixoto ^{LUS}; (Portugal) Henrique Cortes; (Portugal) Nuno Pina	**Backrow**: (Portugal) **Manuel Picão** ^{LUS}; (Portugal) **João Granate** (c) ^{LUS}; (Portugal) **Pedro Afra Rosa**; (Portugal) Nuno Peixoto ^{LUS}; (Portugal) João Vital; (Portugal) Mateus Ferreira; (Portugal) Miguel Romero Rodrigues; (Portugal) António Mello; (Portugal) Diogo Matos; (Portugal) Frederico Castello Branco; (Portugal) Guilherme Spratley; (Portugal) António Carvalho; **Scrum-halves**: (Portugal) **João Dias** ^{LUS}; (Japan) Kenta Kutsuna; (Portugal) Afonso Castiñeira; (Portugal) Salvador Seabra; **Fly-halves**: (Portugal) Martim Dias ^{LUS}; (Portugal) Bernardo Nogueira	**Three-quarters**: (Portugal) João Afra Rosa ^{LUS}; (Portugal) Francisco Afra Rosa ^{LUS}; (Portugal) Manuel Reis ^{LUS}; (Portugal) Tomás Batista ^{LUS}; (Argentina) Joaquin Bustos; (France) Yanis Cornet; (Portugal) João Burnay; (Portugal) Duarte Portela; (Portugal) Ricardo Mieiro; (Portugal) Francisco Teixeira; (Portugal) Francisco Pinto; (Portugal) Manuel Romero Rodrigues; (Portugal) Hugo Miguel Cristóvão; (Portugal) Tomás Cary; **Fullbacks**: (Portugal) **Caetano Castelo Branco**; (Portugal) João Vaz Antunes; (Portugal) Martim Dias; (Portugal) Frederico Roquette; (Portugal) Vasco Trindade
(c) denotes the team captain: **Bold** denotes internationally capped players.; **LUS** denotes Lusitanos capped players.; ^{*} denotes players qualified to play for Portugal on residency or dual nationality.

The CDUL squad for the 2026–27 Campeonato Nacional de Rugby season
**Props**: (Brazil) **Matheus Rocha**; (Portugal) **Miguel Vilaça**; (Argentina) Santiago Bonavento; (Portugal) José Almeida; (Portugal) Gonçalo Alves; (Portugal) António Carmona; (Portugal) Vicente Almeida; (Portugal) Bruno Pinto; (Portugal) Santiago Almeida; **Hookers**: (Argentina) Mariano Muntaner; (Portugal) Samuel Marques; (Portugal) Manuel Magriço; **Locks**: (Portugal) Luis Avides Moreira ^{LUS}; (Portugal) Diogo D'Almeida ^{LUS}; (Netherlands) Rijk Herremans; (Portugal) Guilherme Monteiro; (Portugal) Domingos Gonçalves; (Portugal) Flávio Carvalho; (Portugal) Vasco Leal da Costa	**Backrow**: (Portugal) **José Libano Monteiro** ^{LUS}; (Portugal) **José Roque** ^{LUS}; (Lithuania) **Erikas Zukanskas**; (New Zealand) Braden Stewart; (Portugal) Rodrigo Braz de Oliveira; (Portugal) Nuno Macedo; (Portugal) Francisco Tavares; (Portugal) Eduardo Queiróz; (Portugal) Guilherme Rodrigues; (Portugal) Martim Almeida; (Portugal) Luis Moreira; **Scrum-halves**: (Portugal) Duarte Cortes; (Portugal) Martim Domingues; (Portugal) Tiago Domingues; **Fly-halves**: (Portugal) **Jorge Abecasis** ^{LUS}; (New Zealand) Larenz Tupaea-Thomen; (Portugal) António Nuncio; (Portugal) Faustino Gama; (Portugal) Pedro Neiva; (Portugal) Rodrigo Gingado	**Three-quarters**: (Portugal) **Tomás Appleton** ^{LUS}; (Portugal) **Martim Faro** ^{LUS}; (Portugal) João Vieira ^{LUS}; (Portugal) João Cardoso; (Portugal) Afonso Alvarez; (Portugal) Duarte Duarte; (Portugal) Hussein Sacoor; (Portugal) Salvador Silva; (Portugal) Tomé Lobo; (Portugal) Guilherme Oliveira; (Portugal) Pedro Jaleco; (Portugal) Vicente Tomás; **Fullbacks**: (South Africa) Shane Van Rooyen; (Portugal) Pedro Roldão
(c) denotes the team captain: **Bold** denotes internationally capped players.; **LUS** denotes Lusitanos capped players.; ^{*} denotes players qualified to play for Portugal on residency or dual nationality.

The Belenenses squad for the 2026–27 Campeonato Nacional de Rugby season
**Props**: (Chile) **Lucas Bordigoni**; (Portugal) **Manuel Worm**; (Argentina) Luciano Torres; (Germany) Christoph Obenaus; (Portugal) Frederico Simões; (Portugal) Bernardo Veiga; (Portugal) Joaquim Cunha; (Portugal) Manuel Baptista; (Portugal) Salvador Carvalho; (Portugal) Vicente Gomes; **Hookers**: (Argentina) Guillermo Lawrie; (Portugal) Miguel Nunes ^{LUS}; (Portugal) Diogo Ribeiro; **Locks**: (Samoa) **Jay Tuivaiti**; (England) Ollie Grobler; (Portugal) José Moreira; (Portugal) Francisco Simões; (Portugal) Martim Ferreira; (Portugal) António Andrade	**Backrow**: (Portugal) **David Wallis** ^{LUS}; (Portugal) **Vasco Baptista** ^{LUS}; (Portugal) **André Cunha** ^{LUS}; (Portugal) Manuel Pinto ^{LUS}; (Ireland) André Birdthistle; (Portugal) Tomás Sequeira (c); (Portugal) Diogo Raposo; (Portugal) Martim Ferreira; (Portugal) Pedro Andrade; **Scrum-halves**: (Portugal) **Duarte Azevedo** ^{LUS}; (Portugal) João Menéres; **Fly-halves**: (Portugal) Francisco Menéres ^{LUS}; (Portugal) António Menéres; (Portugal) Manuel Menéres	**Three-quarters**: (Portugal) **José Paiva dos Santos** ^{LUS}; (Portugal) **Duarte Moreira** ^{LUS}; (Portugal) **Diogo Rodrigues** ^{LUS}; (Wales) Owen Jenkins; (Fiji) Filimoni Waqainabete; (Portugal) Lourenço Pedras; (Portugal) Gonçalo Santos; (Portugal) Francisco Galveias; (Portugal) Diogo Norton; (Portugal) Martim Azevedo; (Portugal) Rodrigo Cardoso; (Portugal) Bernardo Macedo; **Fullbacks**: (Portugal) Salvador da Cunha Jr. ^{LUS}; (Portugal) Francisco Murta; (Portugal) Guilherme Marques
(c) denotes the team captain: **Bold** denotes internationally capped players.; **LUS** denotes Lusitanos capped players.; ^{*} denotes players qualified to play for Portugal on residency or dual nationality.

The São Miguel squad for the 2026–27 Campeonato Nacional de Rugby season
**Props**: (Fiji) **Robert Delai**; (Zimbabwe) **Stanley Muranganwa**; (Argentina) Ramiro Pennella; (Argentina) Alexander Arroyo; (Argentina) Mateo Suarez; (Portugal) Afonso Loureiro; (Portugal) Tomas Fernandes Campos; (Portugal) Pedro Botelho; **Hookers**: (Brazil) **Henrique Ferreira**; (Argentina) Thomas Goyochea; (Portugal) Miguel Seoane; (Portugal) Junior Mendes; **Locks**: (Brazil) **Felipe Rosa**; (Argentina) Nicolas Bertoldi; (Argentina) Gonzalo Aguiar; (Portugal) Pedro Oliveira; (Portugal) Duarte Carolino	**Backrow**: (South Africa) Sabata Mokhachane* ^{LUS}; (Argentina) Tomás Bujazha; (New Zealand) Ronan Dynes; (New Zealand) Leslie Hills; (Portugal) Miguel Orrico; (Portugal) Sebastião Coelho; (Portugal) Bernardo Carrelo; (Portugal) Francisco Conde; **Scrum-halves**: (Italy) Niccolo Cristofaro; **Fly-halves**: (Germany) **Bader Pretorius** (c); (Netherlands) Kai Van Kampen; (Spain) Gael Garcia; (Portugal) Francisco Teixeira	**Three-quarters**: (Brazil) **Robson Morais**; (Italy) Luca Pagnani; (France) Evrard Blain; (Portugal) Francisco Cardoso; (Portugal) João Ruivo; (Portugal) Rafael Ferreira; (Portugal) Miguel Azevedo; **Fullbacks**: (Italy) Andrea Ragno*; (Portugal) Tiago Girão
(c) denotes the team captain: **Bold** denotes internationally capped players.; **LUS** denotes Lusitanos capped players.; ^{*} denotes players qualified to play for Portugal on residency or dual nationality.

The Agronomia squad for the 2026–27 Campeonato Nacional de Rugby season
**Props**: (Portugal) **Francisco Domingues** ^{LUS}; (Chile) **Fabián Lagos**; (Argentina) Rodrigo Correa; (Argentina) Mariano García; (Uruguay) Santiago Cagnone; (Portugal) Nicolau Turabelidze ^{LUS}; (Portugal) Luís Souto Barreiros; (Portugal) Diogo Carvalho; **Hookers**: (Portugal) **Pedro Vicente** ^{LUS}; (Portugal) Hugo Oliveira; (Portugal) Bernardo Cardoso; (Portugal) Eduardo Uva; **Locks**: (Portugal) **Duarte Pedro Nunes** ^{LUS}; (Portugal) **José Rebelo de Andrade** ^{LUS}; (Portugal) **António Rebelo de Andrade** ^{LUS}; (Argentina) Tobias Ruffino; (Portugal) Pedro Herédia; (Portugal) Bernardo B. Cardoso; (Portugal) Simão Salgueiro; (Portugal) Diogo Carvalho	**Backrow**: (Portugal) Francisco Cabral (c) ^{LUS}; (Portugal) Diogo Sarmento ^{LUS}; (Argentina) Guido Riva; (Portugal) Manuel Navalhinhas; (Portugal) João P. Fernandes; (Portugal) Duarte Vasco Costa; (Portugal) José Ramalho; **Scrum-halves**: (Portugal) **Tomás Amado** ^{LUS}; (Argentina) Juan de la Cruz Molina; (Portugal) Frederico Barbosa; **Fly-halves**: (Portugal) **Domingos Cabral** ^{LUS}; (Portugal) Simão Sousa; (Portugal) José Maria Cunha	**Three-quarters**: (Portugal) **Vasco Ribeiro** ^{LUS}; (Portugal) Vasco Leite ^{LUS}; (Portugal) José do Carmo Câmara; (Portugal) José Carmo; (Portugal) Bernardo Valente; (Portugal) Manuel Ramalho; (Portugal) Vasco Câmara; (Portugal) Pedro Ribeiro; (Portugal) Eduardo Leite; (Portugal) Salvador Botelho; (Portugal) João Castro; **Full-back**: (Portugal) **Manuel Cardoso Pinto** ^{LUS}; (Ireland) Ciarian Roberts; (Portugal) Gonçalo Vasco Costa
(c) denotes the team captain: **Bold** denotes internationally capped players.; **LUS** denotes Lusitanos capped players.; ^{*} denotes players qualified to play for Portugal on residency or dual nationality.

The CR Técnico squad for the 2026–27 Campeonato Nacional de Rugby season
**Props**: (Portugal) **André Arrojado** ^{LUS}; (Samoa) Tevita Langi; (New Zealand) Meli Sifa; (Portugal) Salvador Patrício; (Portugal) Diogo Teixeira; **Hookers**: (Brazil) **Endy William**; (Portugal) João Nobre; **Locks**: (Portugal) **Guilherme Costa** ^{LUS}; (Portugal) Afonso Cirilo; (Portugal) Gonçalo Costa; (Portugal) Miguel Pereira; (Portugal) Alexandre Rosário Silva; (Portugal) Simão Medeiro; (Portugal) Sérgio Medeiro	**Backrow**: (New Zealand) Reegan Wheeler; (New Zealand) Milan Kriletich; (Portugal) Manuel Serrano; (Portugal) Tomás Mano; (Portugal) Manuel Maia; (Portugal) Pedro Nunes; (Portugal) Salvador Bento; (Portugal) Filipe Caeiro; (Portugal) João D'Orey; (Portugal) Francisco Cirilo; **Scrum-halves**: (Portugal) **Pedro Lucas** ^{LUS}; (Portugal) André Aquino; (Portugal) Manuel Salinas; **Fly-halves**: (Portugal) Hugo Trigueiro; (Portugal) Francisco Correia	**Three-quarters**: (Portugal) Francisco Salgado ^{LUS}; (Italy) Marco Broggin; (France) Lenny Valleyé; (New Zealand) Kanavale Helu; (Portugal) Rodrigo Henriques; (Portugal) Francisco Vallêra; (Portugal) Diogo Salgado; (Portugal) Guilherme Sampaio; (Portugal) Mateus Fontes; (Portugal) António Cardoso; (Portugal) Pedro Madruga; **Fullbacks**: (New Zealand) Rewita Biddle; (Portugal) Miguel Rosa; (Portugal) Manuel Salgado; (Portugal) Nuno Fradinho
(c) denotes the team captain: **Bold** denotes internationally capped players.; **LUS** denotes Lusitanos capped players.; ^{*} denotes players qualified to play for Portugal on residency or dual nationality.

The CDUP squad for the 2026–27 Campeonato Nacional de Rugby season
**Props**: (Georgia (country)) Nikolozi Martiashvili; (Georgia (country)) Zviad Tsamalaidze; (Portugal) Henrique Freitas; **Hookers**: (Portugal) Nuno Figueiredo; (Portugal) Gonçalo Sousa Soares; **Locks**: (Argentina) Gonzalo Poblete; (Portugal) Rodrigo Mateus; (Portugal) Henrique Vieira	**Backrow**: (Georgia (country)) **Ioseb Gusharashvili**; (Portugal) Henrique Santos; (Portugal) Francisco Figueiredo; (Portugal) João Duarte; (Portugal) José Cintra; (Portugal) António Craveiro; **Scrum-halves**: (Portugal) Lourenço Cardoso; (Portugal) Vasco Santos; **Fly-halves**: (Portugal) Tiago Rocha; (Portugal) Luis Agrelos	**Three-quarters**: (Portugal) Mateus Libório Tavares ^{LUS}; (Argentina) Rodrigo Gauna; (Portugal) Tomás Marrana; (Portugal) Lucas Velo; (Portugal) Afonso Aguiar; (Portugal) José Diogo; (Portugal) Salvador Cardoso; (Portugal) Gonçalo Barbosa; (Portugal) Luis Roque; (Portugal) Sebastião Maçanita; **Fullbacks**: (Portugal) **Nuno Sousa Guedes** ^{LUS}; (Portugal) Nuno Maia
(c) denotes the team captain: **Bold** denotes internationally capped players.; **LUS** denotes Lusitanos capped players.; ^{*} denotes players qualified to play for Portugal on residency or dual nationality.

The RC Santarém squad for the 2026–27 Campeonato Nacional de Rugby season
**Props**: (Brazil) **Luan Almeida**; (Brazil) **Aquiles Schlüter**; (Portugal) António Maltez; (Portugal) Tomás Santos Silva; **Hookers**: (Brazil) Jhonatan Dias; (Portugal) João Almeida; (Portugal) Diogo Nogueira; **Locks**: (Brazil) **Matheus Daniel**; (Portugal) Francisco Serra; (Portugal) João Valério; (Portugal) Francisco Aires	**Backrow**: (Portugal) Bernando Almeida; (Portugal) João Faro; (Portugal) João Oliveira; (Portugal) Pedro Baptista; (Portugal) Exequiel Ligios; **Scrum-halves**: (Brazil) **Francisco Sanchis Bouzas**; (Portugal) António Prazeres; (Portugal) Manuel Campos; **Fly-halves**: (Brazil) **Rafael Morales**; (Portugal) Duarte Palha	**Three-quarters**: (Brazil) **Victor Guilherme Souza**; (Brazil) **Sérgio Luna**; (Portugal) Martim Alves; (Portugal) Tiago Dimas; (Portugal) Manuel Mira; (Portugal) João Soares; **Fullbacks**: (Portugal) Francisco Fonseca; (Portugal) Francisco Grilo
(c) denotes the team captain: **Bold** denotes internationally capped players.; **LUS** denotes Lusitanos capped players.; ^{*} denotes players qualified to play for Portugal on residency or dual nationality.

The Académica squad for the 2026–27 Campeonato Nacional de Rugby season
**Props**: (Brazil) **Alexandre Alves**; (Brazil) João Henrique Arnaud; (Argentina) Haidar Eljatib; (Italy) Nahuel Harsh; (Portugal) João Claúdio Dos Santos; (Portugal) Francisco Gonçalves; (Portugal) Filipe Hipólito; **Hookers**: (Portugal) Edmundo Ferreira ^{LUS}; (Portugal) João Aguiar; **Locks**: (Brazil) Artur Lima; (Czech Republic) Matyas Jandik; (Portugal) Daniel Almeida; (Portugal) Francisco Teles; (Portugal) Diogo Sanches; (Portugal) Guilherme Coelho; (Portugal) Afonso Cabral	**Backrow**: (Argentina) Esteban Albornoz; (Portugal) Miguel André; (Portugal) Francisco Curica; (Portugal) Francisco Rovira; (Portugal) Vasco Tojo; **Scrum-halves**: (Brazil) **Rafael Gattino**; (Portugal) Silvio Costa; (Portugal) Ruben Ari; **Fly-halves**: (Uruguay) **Icaro Amarillo**; (South Africa) Ron McCrimmon; (Portugal) Joaquim Couto	**Three-quarters**: (Netherlands) **Tobias Nota**; (Portugal) João Cunha ^{LUS}; (Portugal) David Tender Gomes ^{LUS}; (Portugal) António Pinto Costa ^{LUS}; (Portugal) Francisco Migueis; (Portugal) Nuno Fernandes; (Portugal) Nuno Cardoso; **Fullbacks**: (Portugal) Tiago Pintão; (Portugal) Gaspar Neto; (Portugal) Francisco Carrito
(c) denotes the team captain: **Bold** denotes internationally capped players.; **LUS** denotes Lusitanos capped players.; ^{*} denotes players qualified to play for Portugal on residency or dual nationality.
