= 2024–25 Campeonato Nacional de Rugby Divisão de Honra =

Portugal rugby union season

2024–25 TOP 12
- Countries: Portugal
- Number of teams: 12
- Champions: Belenenses
- Runners-up: Cascais
- Relegated: Lousã
- Top point scorer: Santiago Jara
- Top try scorer: Fabian Contreras

Official website
- www.fpr.pt

The Campeonato Nacional de Rugby Divisão de Honra (more commonly known as the Divisão de Honra) is Portugal's top level professional men's rugby union competition. The Divisão de Honra Championships are organized by the Federação Portuguesa de Rugby (Portuguese Rugby Federation) and currently consists of 12 teams. The last placed team in the competition is relegated at the end of the season to the Campeonato Nacional de Rugby I Divisão (Portugal's second level of men's rugby union) with one team from the second-tier competition promoted to the Divisão de Honra.

Location of teams in 2024–25 TOP 12

== Format ==
The Divisão de Honra will be divided by two tournaments:

- Torneio de Abertura
- Divisão de Honra
  - Regular season
  - Final season

The Torneio de Abertura will be played for an initial tournament consisting of two groups of 6 teams, played for one return, a 1/2 between 1st and 2nd classifieds and the final. The Torneio de Abertura is expected to be played from September 22 to November 28.

The Regular season of Divisão de Honra will be played by three groups of four (4) teams, which play in the system of all against all. At the end of regular season, the top 2 teams of each group will take part in the championship group that will determine the champion while the bottom 2 teams will play in "Plate Cup" group. The Divisão de Honra is expected to be played from December 7 and ends on May 25.

Points are awarded according to the following:

- 4 points for a win
- 2 points for a draw
- 1 bonus point is awarded to a team scoring 4 tries or more in a match, while scoring at least 3 more tries than the opponent.
- 1 bonus point is awarded to a team that loses a match by 7 points or fewer

=== Promotion and relegation ===
Following the extension of the number of teams from 10 to 12, the same 10 teams that played last season will remain and compete again in the championship. The newcomers are the lower division champion Técnico and runner-up RC Montemor.

The bottom team of "Plate Cup" group will be relegated to the lower division.

== Teams ==
Team	Manager	Captain	Stadium	Capacity
Académica	(South Africa) Lodie Van Staden	(Portugal) António Salgueiro	Estádio Municipal Sérgio Conceição	2500
Agronomia	(Portugal) Luís Pissarra	(Portugal) João Lima	Tapada da Ajuda	500
Belenenses	(Portugal) João Mirra	(Portugal) Tomás Sequeira	Belém Rugby Park	500
Benfica	(Portugal) Martim Aguiar	(New Zealand) Hayden Hann	Campo nº2 - Lisbon University	1500
Cascais	(Argentina) Gabriel Ascárate	(Portugal) António Vidinha	Estádio Municipal Dramático Cascais	1000
CDUL	(New Zealand) Kane Hancy	(Portugal) Tomás Appleton	Estádio Universitário de Lisboa	8000
CDUP	(Portugal) Francisco Vareta	(Portugal) Tomás Marrana	Estádio Universitário do Porto	1500
Direito	(Portugal) Bernardo Mota	(Portugal) Duarte Diniz	Complexo Desportivo Miguel Nobre Ferreira	2500
Lousã	(Argentina) Claudio Venturino	(Portugal) Paulo Marques	Estádio Municipal de Rugby José Redondo	500
RC Montemor	(Portugal) João Baptista Malta	(Portugal) Manuel Marques dos Santos	Parque Desportivo Municipal	500
São Miguel	(Portugal) João Uva	(Fiji) Robert Delai	Bulldog Rugby Park	800
C. R. Técnico	(Portugal) António Manzoni de Sequeira	(Portugal) Rodrigo Bento	Campo das Olaias	800

== Torneio de Abertura ==
The teams are distributed by two groups of six teams, in which they play with each other once:

Group A	Group B
Belenenses	Agronomia
Direito	Benfica
Cascais	CDUL
Académica	São Miguel
Lousã	Técnico
CDUP	RC Montemor

The Torneio de Abertura is expected to be played from September 22 to November 28.

=== Group Stage ===
==== Group A ====
Group A Table
	Club	Played	Won	Drawn	Lost	Points For	Points Against	Points Diff.	Try Bonus	Losing Bonus	Points
1	Cascais	5	5	0	0	209	46	163	3	0	23
2	Belenenses	5	4	0	1	235	70	165	3	1	20
3	Direito	5	2	0	3	121	96	25	1	1	10
4	CDUP	5	2	0	3	59	154	-95	0	1	9
5	Lousã	5	1	0	4	90	209	-119	0	1	5
6	Académica	5	1	0	4	41	180	-139	0	0	4
Green background (rows 1 and 2) advance to "Cup" Cup. Blue background (rows 3 and 4) advance to "Plate" Cup Red background (rows 5 and 6) advance to "Silver" Cup. Updated: 24 June 2025

===== Round 1 =====
27 September 2024
20:00

Direito	7-22	Belenenses
Try: 1x Con: 1x Pen: x Drop: x		Try: 3x Con: x Pen: x Drop: x

Complexo Desportivo Miguel Nobre Ferreira

05 October 2024
17:30

Cascais	59-0	Lousã
Try: 9x Con: x Pen: x Drop: x		Try: 0x Con: x Pen: x Drop: x

Estádio Municipal Dramático Cascais

05 October 2024
15:00

Académica	19-12	CDUP
Try: 3x Con: x Pen: x Drop: x		Try: 2x Con: x Pen: x Drop: x

Estádio Municipal Sérgio Conceição

===== Round 2 =====
13 October 2024
16:00

Belenenses	24-27	Cascais
Try: 3x Con: x Pen: x Drop: x		Try: 2x Con: x Pen: x Drop: x

Belém Rugby Park

13 October 2024
14:00

CDUP	21-19	Direito
Try: 3x Con: x Pen: x Drop: x		Try: 3x Con: x Pen: x Drop: x

Estádio Universitário do Porto

11 October 2024
21:00

Lousã	25-7	Académica
Try: 1x Con: x Pen: x Drop: x		Try: 1x Con: 1x Pen: x Drop: x

Estádio Municipal de Rugby José Redondo

===== Round 3 =====
19 October 2024
15:00

Académica	3-67	Belenenses
Try: 0x Con: x Pen: x Drop: x		Try: 11x Con: x Pen: x Drop: x

Estádio Municipal Sérgio Conceição

19 October 2024
15:00

Cascais	26-15	Direito
Try: 3x Con: x Pen: x Drop: x		Try: 2x Con: x Pen: x Drop: x

Estádio Municipal Dramático Cascais

19 October 2024
17:30

CDUP	19-17	Lousã
Try: 3x Con: x Pen: x Drop: x		Try: 2x Con: x Pen: x Drop: x

Estádio Universitário do Porto

===== Round 4 =====
26 October 2024
13:00

Belenenses	91-26	Lousã
Try: 15x Con: x Pen: x Drop: x		Try: 4x Con: x Pen: x Drop: x

Belém Rugby Park

26 October 2024
13:00

Direito	47-5	Académica
Try: 7x Con: x Pen: x Drop: x		Try: 1x Con: x Pen: x Drop: x

Complexo Desportivo Miguel Nobre Ferreira

26 October 2024
15:00

Cascais	68-0	CDUP
Try: 10x Con: x Pen: x Drop: x		Try: 0x Con: x Pen: x Drop: x

Estádio Municipal Dramático Cascais

===== Round 5 =====
01 November 2024
15:00

CDUP	7-31	Belenenses
Try: 1x Con: 1x Pen: x Drop: x		Try: 5x Con: x Pen: x Drop: x

Estádio Universitário do Porto

01 November 2024
15:00

Lousã	22-33	Direito
Try: 3x Con: x Pen: x Drop: x		Try: 5x Con: x Pen: x Drop: x

Estádio Municipal de Rugby José Redondo

01 November 2024
15:00

Académica	7-29	Cascais
Try: 1x Con: 1x Pen: x Drop: x		Try: 4x Con: x Pen: x Drop: x

Estádio Municipal Sérgio Conceição

==== Group B ====
Group B Table
	Club	Played	Won	Drawn	Lost	Points For	Points Against	Points Diff.	Try Bonus	Losing Bonus	Points
1	CDUL	5	5	0	0	167	73	94	3	0	23
2	Benfica	5	4	0	1	216	82	134	2	1	19
3	São Miguel	5	3	0	2	143	103	40	2	1	15
4	Agronomia	5	2	0	3	135	116	19	1	0	9
5	Técnico	5	1	0	4	76	194	-118	0	0	4
6	RC Montemor	5	0	0	5	60	229	-169	0	1	1
Green background (rows 1 and 2) advance to "Cup" Cup. Blue background (rows 3 and 4) advance to "Plate" Cup Red background (rows 5 and 6) advance to "Silver" Cup. Updated: 24 June 2025

===== Round 1 =====
28 September 2024
17:00

Benfica	30-21	Agronomia
Try: 2x Con: x Pen: x Drop: x		Try: 3x Con: x Pen: x Drop: x

Campo nº2 Lisbon University

04 October 2024
20:00

Técnico	17-38	CDUL
Try: 2x Con: x Pen: x Drop: x		Try: 6x Con: x Pen: x Drop: x

Campo das Olaias

28 September 2024
16:00

São Miguel	41-5	RC Montemor
Try: 7x Con: x Pen: x Drop: x		Try: 1x Con: x Pen: x Drop: x

Bulldog Rugby Park

===== Round 2 =====
11 October 2024
21:00

Agronomia	8-28	CDUL
Try: 1x Con: x Pen: x Drop: x		Try: 4x Con: x Pen: x Drop: x

Tapada da Ajuda

12 October 2024
15:00

RC Montemor	15-84	Benfica
Try: 2x Con: x Pen: x Drop: x		Try: 12x Con: x Pen: x Drop: x

Parque Desportivo Municipal

11 October 2024
20:00

Técnico	23-31	São Miguel
Try: 2x Con: x Pen: x Drop: x		Try: 5x Con: x Pen: x Drop: x

Campo das Olaias

===== Round 3 =====
19 October 2024
16:30

São Miguel	40-27	Agronomia
Try: 5x Con: x Pen: x Drop: x		Try: 3x Con: x Pen: x Drop: x

Bulldog Rugby Park

19 October 2024
15:00

CDUL	27-22	Benfica
Try: 3x Con: x Pen: x Drop: x		Try: 3x Con: x Pen: x Drop: x

Estádio Universitário de Lisboa

18 October 2024
20:30

RC Montemor	21-23	Técnico
Try: 3x Con: x Pen: x Drop: x		Try: 3x Con: x Pen: x Drop: x

Parque Desportivo Municipal

===== Round 4 =====
26 October 2024
17:00

Agronomia	52-6	Técnico
Try: 8x Con: x Pen: x Drop: x		Try: 0x Con: x Pen: x Drop: x

Tapada da Ajuda

26 October 2024
15:00

São Miguel	12-28	Benfica
Try: 2x Con: x Pen: x Drop: x		Try: 3x Con: x Pen: x Drop: x

Bulldog Rugby Park

25 October 2024
21:30

CDUL	54-7	RC Montemor
Try: 8x Con: x Pen: x Drop: x		Try: 1x Con: x Pen: x Drop: x

Estádio Universitário de Lisboa

===== Round 5 =====
01 November 2024
11:00

RC Montemor	12-27	Agronomia
Try: 2x Con: x Pen: x Drop: x		Try: 4x Con: x Pen: x Drop: x

Parque Desportivo Municipal

01 November 2024
16:00

Técnico	7-52	Benfica
Try: 1x Con: x Pen: x Drop: x		Try: 8x Con: x Pen: x Drop: x

Campo das Olaias

01 November 2024
16:30

São Miguel	19-20	CDUL
Try: 3x Con: x Pen: x Drop: x		Try: 2x Con: x Pen: x Drop: x

Bulldog Rugby Park

=== Final Phase ===
==== "Cup" Cup ====
Semifinals
1	Cascais	35
2	Benfica	17
1	CDUL	23
2	Belenenses	16

Final
Cascais
CDUL

===== Semifinals =====
16 November 2024
13:00

Cascais	35-17	Benfica
Try: 2x Con: x Pen: x Drop: x		Try: 2x Con: x Pen: x Drop: x

Estádio Municipal Dramático Cascais

16 November 2024
18:30

CDUL	23-16	Belenenses
Try: 2x Con: x Pen: x Drop: x		Try: 1x Con: x Pen: x Drop: x

Estádio Universitário de Lisboa

==== "Plate" Cup ====
Semifinals
3	Direito	13
4	Agronomia	20
3	São Miguel	59
4	CDUP	3

Final
Agronomia
São Miguel

===== Semifinals =====
16 November 2024
12:30

Direito	13-20	Agronomia
Try: 1x Con: x Pen: x Drop: x		Try: 0x Con: x Pen: x Drop: x

Complexo Desportivo Miguel Nobre Ferreira

16 November 2024
15:00

São Miguel	59-3	CDUP
Try: 1x Con: x Pen: x Drop: x		Try: 0x Con: x Pen: x Drop: x

Bulldog Rugby Park

===== Final =====
23 November 2024
14:00

São Miguel	-	Agronomia
Try: x Con: x Pen: x Drop: x		Try: x Con: x Pen: x Drop: x

CAR JAMOR

==== "Silver" Cup ====
Semifinals
5	Lousã
6	RC Montemor
5	Técnico	10
6	Académica	58

Final
Lousã
Académica

===== Semifinals =====
Walkover

Lousã	v	RC Montemor
Try: x Con: x Pen: x Drop: x		Try: x Con: x Pen: x Drop: x

Estádio Municipal de Rugby José Redondo

17 November 2024
14:00

Técnico	10-58	Académica
Try: 1x Con: x Pen: x Drop: x		Try: 8x Con: x Pen: x Drop: x

Campo das Olaias

===== Final =====
23 November 2024
15:00

Académica	v	Lousã
Try: x Con: x Pen: x Drop: x		Try: x Con: x Pen: x Drop: x

Estádio Municipal Sérgio Conceição

== Regular season ==
The teams are distributed by three groups of four teams, in which they play between themselves in home and away matches for the regular season:

Group A	Group B	Group C
Belenenses	Agronomia	Direito
CDUL	Cascais	Benfica
Académica	São Miguel	Lousã
RC Montemor	CDUP	Técnico

The Divisão de Honra is expected to be played from December 7 and ends on May 25.

=== Group Stage ===
==== Group A ====
Group A Table
	Club	Played	Won	Drawn	Lost	Points For	Points Against	Points Diff.	Try Bonus	Losing Bonus	Points
1	Belenenses	6	6	0	0	268	83	185	4	0	28
2	CDUL	6	4	0	2	338	113	225	3	1	20
3	Académica	6	2	0	4	128	258	-130	1	0	9
4	RC Montemor	6	0	0	6	94	374	-280	0	1	1
Green background (rows 1 and 2) advance to "Champion" group.Red background (rows 3 and 4) advance to "Plate" group. Updated: 24 June 2025

===== Round 1 =====
07 December 2024
15:30

Académica	14-28	Belenenses
Try: 1x Con: x Pen: x Drop: x		Try: 4x Con: x Pen: x Drop: x

Estádio Municipal Sérgio Conceição

08 December 2024
12:00

CDUL	94-12	RC Montemor
Try: 14x Con: x Pen: x Drop: x		Try: 2x Con: x Pen: x Drop: x

Estádio Universitário de Lisboa

===== Round 2 =====
14 December 2024
16:00

Belenenses	29-12	CDUL
Try: 3x Con: x Pen: x Drop: x		Try: 0x Con: x Pen: x Drop: x

Belém Rugby Park

14 December 2024
14:00

RC Montemor	36-42	Académica
Try: 5x Con: x Pen: x Drop: x		Try: 6x Con: x Pen: x Drop: x

Parque Desportivo Municipal

===== Round 3 =====
21 December 2024
16:00

RC Montemor	7-97	Belenenses
Try: 1x Con: x Pen: x Drop: x		Try: 15x Con: x Pen: x Drop: x

Parque Desportivo Municipal

22 December 2024
15:00

Académica	26-38	CDUL
Try: 3x Con: x Pen: x Drop: x		Try: 4x Con: x Pen: x Drop: x

Estádio Municipal Sérgio Conceição

===== Round 4 =====
05 January 2025
14:00

Belenenses	43-17	Académica
Try: 7x Con: x Pen: x Drop: x		Try: 2x Con: x Pen: x Drop: x

Belém Rugby Park

04 January 2025
12:00

RC Montemor	17-70	CDUL
Try: 2x Con: x Pen: x Drop: x		Try: 12x Con: x Pen: x Drop: x

Parque Desportivo Municipal

===== Round 5 =====
11 January 2025
18:00

CDUL	19-26	Belenenses
Try: 1x Con: x Pen: x Drop: x		Try: 2x Con: x Pen: x Drop: x

Estádio Universitário de Lisboa

11 January 2025
15:30

Académica	26-8	RC Montemor
Try: 4x Con: x Pen: x Drop: x		Try: 1x Con: x Pen: x Drop: x

Estádio Municipal Sérgio Conceição

===== Round 6 =====
19 January 2025
16:00

Belenenses	45-14	RC Montemor
Try: 7x Con: x Pen: x Drop: x		Try: 2x Con: x Pen: x Drop: x

Belém Rugby Park

18 January 2025
14:00

CDUL	105-3	Académica
Try: 15x Con: x Pen: x Drop: x		Try: 0x Con: x Pen: x Drop: x

Estádio Universitário de Lisboa

==== Group B ====
Group B Table
	Club	Played	Won	Drawn	Lost	Points For	Points Against	Points Diff.	Try Bonus	Losing Bonus	Points
1	Cascais	6	4	1	1	203	85	118	2	0	20
2	São Miguel	6	4	0	2	164	126	38	1	0	17
3	Agronomia	6	3	1	2	132	111	21	1	1	16
4	CDUP	6	0	0	6	84	261	-177	0	1	1
Green background (rows 1 and 2) advance to "Champion" group.Red background (rows 3 and 4) advance to "Plate" group. Updated: 24 June 2025

===== Round 1 =====
07 December 2024
14:30

São Miguel	20-13	Agronomia
Try: 2x Con: x Pen: x Drop: x		Try: 1x Con: x Pen: x Drop: x

Bulldog Rugby Park

07 December 2024
15:00

Cascais	64-14	CDUP
Try: 9x Con: x Pen: x Drop: x		Try: 2x Con: x Pen: x Drop: x

Estádio Municipal Dramático Cascais

===== Round 2 =====
15 December 2024
12:00

Agronomia	13-13	Cascais
Try: 1x Con: x Pen: x Drop: x		Try: 1x Con: x Pen: x Drop: x

Tapada da Ajuda

14 December 2024
17:30

CDUP	28-33	São Miguel
Try: 3x Con: x Pen: x Drop: x		Try: 5x Con: x Pen: x Drop: x

Estádio Universitário do Porto

===== Round 3 =====
21 December 2024
16:00

CDUP	9-25	Agronomia
Try: 0x Con: x Pen: x Drop: x		Try: 3x Con: x Pen: x Drop: x

Estádio Universitário do Porto

21 December 2024
17:00

Cascais	38-13	São Miguel
Try: 2x Con: x Pen: x Drop: x		Try: 2x Con: x Pen: x Drop: x

Estádio Municipal Dramático Cascais

===== Round 4 =====
05 January 2025
15:00

Agronomia	25-17	São Miguel
Try: 1x Con: x Pen: x Drop: x		Try: 1x Con: x Pen: x Drop: x

Tapada da Ajuda

04 January 2025
15:00

CDUP	7-40	Cascais
Try: 1x Con: x Pen: x Drop: x		Try: 6x Con: x Pen: x Drop: x

Estádio Universitário do Porto

===== Round 5 =====
11 January 2025
14:00

Cascais	31-11	Agronomia
Try: 3x Con: x Pen: x Drop: x		Try: 1x Con: x Pen: x Drop: x

Estádio Municipal Dramático Cascais

11 January 2025
16:00

São Miguel	54-5	CDUP
Try: 8x Con: x Pen: x Drop: x		Try: 1x Con: x Pen: x Drop: x

Bulldog Rugby Park

===== Round 6 =====
18 January 2025
15:00

Agronomia	45-21	CDUP
Try: 7x Con: x Pen: x Drop: x		Try: 2x Con: x Pen: x Drop: x

Tapada da Ajuda

19 January 2025
15:00

São Miguel	27-17	Cascais
Try: 3x Con: x Pen: x Drop: x		Try: 2x Con: x Pen: x Drop: x

Bulldog Rugby Park

==== Group C ====
Group C Table
	Club	Played	Won	Drawn	Lost	Points For	Points Against	Points Diff.	Try Bonus	Losing Bonus	Points
1	Direito	6	6	0	0	252	41	211	5	0	29
2	Benfica	6	4	0	2	225	112	113	3	1	20
3	Técnico	6	2	0	4	100	194	-94	2	1	11
4	Lousã	6	0	0	6	47	277	-230	0	0	0
Green background (rows 1 and 2) advance to "Champion" group.Red background (rows 3 and 4) advance to "Plate" group. Updated: 24 June 2025

===== Round 1 =====
08 December 2024
14:00

Técnico	32-5	Lousã
Try: 4x Con: x Pen: x Drop: x		Try: 1x Con: x Pen: x Drop: x

Campo das Olaias

07 December 2024
15:00

Direito	25-10	Benfica
Try: 4x Con: x Pen: x Drop: x		Try: 1x Con: x Pen: x Drop: x

Complexo Desportivo Miguel Nobre Ferreira

===== Round 2 =====
14 December 2024
14:00

Lousã	0-50	Direito
Try: 0x Con: x Pen: x Drop: x		Try: 8x Con: x Pen: x Drop: x

Estádio Municipal de Rugby José Redondo

15 December 2024
16:00

Benfica	31-27	Técnico
Try: 3x Con: x Pen: x Drop: x		Try: 2x Con: x Pen: x Drop: x

Campo nº2 Lisbon University

===== Round 3 =====
21 December 2024
15:00

Benfica	57-22	Lousã
Try: 9x Con: x Pen: x Drop: x		Try: 1x Con: x Pen: x Drop: x

Campo nº2 Lisbon University

22 December 2024
12:00

Direito	57-10	Técnico
Try: 8x Con: x Pen: x Drop: x		Try: 1x Con: x Pen: x Drop: x

Complexo Desportivo Miguel Nobre Ferreira

===== Round 4 =====
04 January 2025
15:00

Lousã	3-26	Técnico
Try: 0x Con: x Pen: x Drop: x		Try: 4x Con: x Pen: x Drop: x

Estádio Municipal de Rugby José Redondo

04 January 2025
15:00

Benfica	18-19	Direito
Try: 2x Con: x Pen: x Drop: x		Try: 3x Con: x Pen: x Drop: x

Campo nº2 Lisbon University

===== Round 5 =====
12 January 2025
14:00

Direito	56-3	Lousã
Try: 8x Con: x Pen: x Drop: x		Try: 0x Con: x Pen: x Drop: x

Complexo Desportivo Miguel Nobre Ferreira

11 January 2025
16:00

Técnico	5-53	Benfica
Try: 1x Con: x Pen: x Drop: x		Try: 7x Con: x Pen: x Drop: x

Campo das Olaias

===== Round 6 =====
19 January 2025
15:00

Lousã	14-56	Benfica
Try: 1x Con: x Pen: x Drop: x		Try: 8x Con: x Pen: x Drop: x

Estádio Municipal de Rugby José Redondo

18 January 2025
12:00

Técnico	0-45	Direito
Try: 0x Con: x Pen: x Drop: x		Try: 7x Con: x Pen: x Drop: x

Campo das Olaias

=== Final Phase ===
==== Champion Group ====
Champion Group Table
	Club	Played	Won	Drawn	Lost	Points For	Points Against	Points Diff.	Try Bonus	Losing Bonus	Points
1	Belenenses	10	9	0	1	304	151	153	4	1	41
2	Cascais	10	7	0	3	292	195	97	5	1	34
3	São Miguel	10	5	0	5	233	268	-35	0	0	20
4	Direito	10	4	0	6	216	249	-33	2	1	19
5	CDUL	10	3	1	6	209	221	-12	2	1	17
6	Benfica	10	1	1	8	178	348	-170	0	0	6
Green background (rows 1) crowned champion. Updated: 24 June 2025

===== Round 1 =====
22 March 2025
18:00

Cascais	27-13	CDUL
Try: 4x Con: x Pen: x Drop: x		Try: 1x Con: x Pen: x Drop: x

Estádio Municipal Dramático Cascais

23 March 2025
15:00

Direito	8-17	Belenenses
Try: 1x Con: x Pen: x Drop: x		Try: 3x Con: x Pen: x Drop: x

Complexo Desportivo Miguel Nobre Ferreira

22 March 2025
12:00

Benfica	40-30	São Miguel
Try: 5x Con: x Pen: x Drop: x		Try: 4x Con: x Pen: x Drop: x

Campo nº2 Lisbon University

===== Round 2 =====
29 March 2025
12:00

CDUL	18-26	Direito
Try: 2x Con: x Pen: x Drop: x		Try: 2x Con: x Pen: x Drop: x

Estádio Universitário de Lisboa

30 March 2025
12:00

São Miguel	34-20	Cascais
Try: 4x Con: x Pen: x Drop: x		Try: 2x Con: x Pen: x Drop: x

Bulldog Rugby Park

29 March 2025
16:00

Belenenses	31-0	Benfica
Try: 4x Con: x Pen: x Drop: x		Try: 0x Con: x Pen: x Drop: x

Belém Rugby Park

===== Round 3 =====
06 April 2025
16:30

Benfica	8-24	CDUL
Try: 1x Con: x Pen: x Drop: x		Try: 4x Con: x Pen: x Drop: x

Campo nº2 Lisbon University

06 April 2025
13:30

Direito	13-23	Cascais
Try: 1x Con: x Pen: x Drop: x		Try: 2x Con: x Pen: x Drop: x

Complexo Desportivo Miguel Nobre Ferreira

05 April 2025
18:00

São Miguel	19-30	Belenenses
Try: 2x Con: x Pen: x Drop: x		Try: 3x Con: x Pen: x Drop: x

Bulldog Rugby Park

===== Round 4 =====
19 April 2025
15:00

CDUL	18-27	Belenenses
Try: 2x Con: x Pen: x Drop: x		Try: 2x Con: x Pen: x Drop: x

Estádio Universitário de Lisboa

18 April 2025
15:00

Cascais	56-15	Benfica
Try: 8x Con: x Pen: x Drop: x		Try: 2x Con: x Pen: x Drop: x

Estádio Municipal Dramático Cascais

19 April 2025
12:00

Direito	29-17	São Miguel
Try: 4x Con: x Pen: x Drop: x		Try: 3x Con: x Pen: x Drop: x

Complexo Desportivo Miguel Nobre Ferreira

===== Round 5 =====
25 April 2025
15:00

São Miguel	24-22	CDUL
Try: 3x Con: x Pen: x Drop: x		Try: 4x Con: x Pen: x Drop: x

Bulldog Rugby Park

25 April 2025
14:00

Belenenses	25-32	Cascais
Try: 3x Con: x Pen: x Drop: x		Try: 4x Con: x Pen: x Drop: x

Belém Rugby Park

25 April 2025
17:00

Benfica	17-39	Direito
Try: 2x Con: x Pen: x Drop: x		Try: 5x Con: x Pen: x Drop: x

Campo nº2 Lisbon University

===== Round 6 =====
06 June 2025
20:00

CDUL	5-31	Cascais
Try: 1x Con: x Pen: x Drop: x		Try: 5x Con: x Pen: x Drop: x

Estádio Universitário de Lisboa

06 June 2025
20:00

Belenenses	47-3	Direito
Try: 7x Con: x Pen: x Drop: x		Try: 0x Con: x Pen: x Drop: x

Belém Rugby Park

06 June 2025
21:00

São Miguel	30-12	Benfica
Try: x Con: x Pen: x Drop: x		Try: 2x Con: x Pen: x Drop: x

Bulldog Rugby Park

===== Round 7 =====
10 May 2025
15:00

Direito	8-24	CDUL
Try: 6x Con: x Pen: x Drop: x		Try: 4x Con: x Pen: x Drop: x

Complexo Desportivo Miguel Nobre Ferreira

10 May 2025
15:00

Cascais	13-23	São Miguel
Try: 7x Con: x Pen: x Drop: x		Try: 3x Con: x Pen: x Drop: x

Estádio Municipal Dramático Cascais

10 May 2025
14:00

Benfica	19-30	Belenenses
Try: 2x Con: x Pen: x Drop: x		Try: 8x Con: x Pen: x Drop: x

Campo nº2 Lisbon University

===== Round 8 =====
17 May 2025
14:00

CDUL	31-31	Benfica
Try: 5x Con: x Pen: x Drop: x		Try: 5x Con: x Pen: x Drop: x

Estádio Universitário de Lisboa

17 May 2025
12:00

Cascais	24-17	Direito
Try: 2x Con: x Pen: x Drop: x		Try: 2x Con: x Pen: x Drop: x

Estádio Municipal Dramático Cascais

16 May 2025
20:30

Belenenses	33-5	São Miguel
Try: 5x Con: x Pen: x Drop: x		Try: 1x Con: x Pen: x Drop: x

Belém Rugby Park

===== Round 9 =====
23 May 2025
20:30

Belenenses	29-17	CDUL
Try: 4x Con: x Pen: x Drop: x		Try: 3x Con: x Pen: x Drop: x

Belém Rugby Park

24 May 2025
20:00

Benfica	15-36	Cascais
Try: 2x Con: x Pen: x Drop: x		Try: 6x Con: x Pen: x Drop: x

Campo nº2 Lisbon University

24 May 2025
15:00

São Miguel	41-32	Direito
Try: 6x Con: x Pen: x Drop: x		Try: 5x Con: x Pen: x Drop: x

Bulldog Rugby Park

===== Round 10 =====
31 May 2025
20:00

CDUL	37-10	São Miguel
Try: 5x Con: x Pen: x Drop: x		Try: 1x Con: x Pen: x Drop: x

Estádio Universitário de Lisboa

31 May 2025
18:00

Cascais	30-35	Belenenses
Try: 3x Con: x Pen: x Drop: x		Try: 5x Con: x Pen: x Drop: x

Estádio Municipal Dramático Cascais

31 May 2025
18:00

Direito	41-21	Benfica
Try: 6x Con: x Pen: x Drop: x		Try: 3x Con: x Pen: x Drop: x

Complexo Desportivo Miguel Nobre Ferreira

== Player of year ==
At the end of the season, "Linha de Ensaio" publishes the Oval d'Ouro for the Top12. This award, voted on by the coaches and team captains of the teams that competed in the competition, rewards the best player in the championship.

#	Name	Club	Pts
1	(Argentina) Santiago Jara	Cascais	43
2	(Portugal) Duarte Azevedo	Belenenses	26
3	(Portugal) Francisco Menéres	Belenenses	25
4	(Portugal) Tomás Sequeira	Belenenses	19
5	(South Africa) Shane Van Rooyen	CDUL	15

== Squads 2024/25 ==
Squads are ordered by the last classification of the league. According to Portuguese Rugby Federation

The Belenenses squad for the 2024–25 Campeonato Nacional de Rugby season
**Props**: (Czech Republic) **Anthony Kent**; (Spain) **Joaquin Dominguez**; (Chile) **Lucas Bordigoni**; (Portugal) **Manuel Worm**; (Portugal) Frederico Simões; (Portugal) Pedro Braga; (Portugal) Bernardo Veiga; **Hookers**: (Argentina) Guillermo Lawrie; (Portugal) Miguel Nunes; **Locks**: (Portugal) **Salvador da Cunha**; (Portugal) Manuel Lima; (Portugal) José Moreira; (Portugal) Francisco Simões; (Portugal) António Andrade; (Portugal) Tomás da Cunha; (Portugal) Martim Ferreira	**Backrow**: (Portugal) **Rafael Simões**; (Portugal) **David Wallis**; (Portugal) **André Cunha**; (Portugal) Manuel Pinto; (Portugal) Pedro Cunha; (Portugal) Tomás Sequeira; (Portugal) Sebastião da Cunha; (Portugal) Diogo Raposo; **Scrum-halves**: (Portugal) **Duarte Azevedo**; (Portugal) Francisco Macedo; **Fly-halves**: (Portugal) Francisco Menéres; (Portugal) Manuel Menéres	**Centres**: (Portugal) **Rodrigo Fruedenthal**; (New Zealand) Alex Thrupp; (Portugal) Lourenço Pedras; (Portugal) António Cunha; (Portugal) António Claro; (Portugal) Gonçalo Santos; (Portugal) Tomás Monteiro; **Wingers**: (Portugal) **José Paiva dos Santos**; (Portugal) **Duarte Moreira**; (Wales) Owen Jenkins; (Portugal) Diogo Rodrigues; (Portugal) Francisco Galveias; (Portugal) Lourenço Pedras; (Portugal) Tomás Reis; **Fullbacks**: (Portugal) **Manuel Marta**; (Portugal) Francisco Murta; (Portugal) Salvador da Cunha Jr.
(c) denotes the team captain, **Bold** denotes internationally capped players.^{*} denotes players qualified to play for Portugal on residency or dual nationality.

The Agronomia squad for the 2024–25 Campeonato Nacional de Rugby season
**Props**: (Portugal) **Abel da Cunha**; (Paraguay) **Estéfano Aranda Cáceres**; (Argentina) Rodrigo Correa; (Angola) Abraão Ambrósio*; (Portugal) Francisco Domingues; (Portugal) Afonso Carreira; (Portugal) Nicolau Turabelidze; (Portugal) António Quiroga; **Hookers**: (Portugal) **Pedro Vicente**; (Portugal) Frederico Tenório; (Portugal) Francisco Cabral; (Portugal) Diogo Carvalho; (Portugal) Hugo Oliveira; (Portugal) Joaquim Raimundo; (Portugal) Bernardo Cardoso; **Locks**: (Portugal) **José Rebelo de Andrade**; (Portugal) **António Rebelo de Andrade**; (Portugal) Pedro Herédia; (Portugal) Bernardo B. Cardoso; (Portugal) Simão Salgueiro; (Portugal) Manuel Bação; (Portugal) Luís Rodolfo; (Portugal) António Maria Andrade	**Backrow**: (Argentina) Omar Gutierrez; (Portugal) Francisco Cabral; (Portugal) Manuel Navalhinhas; (Portugal) João P. Fernandes; (Portugal) Francisco Uva; (Portugal) Diogo Sarmento; (Portugal) Vicente Guerra Pinto; (Portugal) Duarte Vasco Costa; (Portugal) João Louro; (Portugal) Francisco Piano Gonçalves; (Portugal) José Ramalho; **Scrum-halves**: (Chile) **Nicolas Herreros**; (Portugal) João Bandeiras; (Portugal) Tomás Amado; (Portugal) Duarte Alves; **Fly-halves**: (Belgium) **Hugo de Franq**; (Portugal) **Domingos Cabral**; (Portugal) Simão Sousa	**Centres**: (Portugal) **João Lima**; (Portugal) **Vasco Ribeiro**; (Portugal) Vasco Leite; (Portugal) Armand Patricio; (Portugal) Sebastião Cardoso; (Portugal) José do Carmo Câmara; (Portugal) Bernardo Valente; (Portugal) Manuel Ramalho; **Wingers**: (Portugal) José Cortes Pena Monteiro; (Portugal) José Carmo Câmara; (Portugal) Vasco Câmara; (Portugal) António Pena Monteiro; (Portugal) Pedro Ribeiro; (Portugal) Rodrigo Castanheira; (Portugal) Eduardo Leite; (Portugal) Salvador Botelho; (Portugal) João Castro; **Fullbacks**: (Portugal) **Manuel Cardoso Pinto**; (Portugal) Gonçalo Vasco Costa
(c) denotes the team captain, **Bold** denotes internationally capped players.^{*} denotes players qualified to play for Portugal on residency or dual nationality.

The Benfica squad for the 2024–25 Campeonato Nacional de Rugby season
**Props**: (Portugal) João Nobre; (Portugal) Márcio Pinheiro; (Portugal) André Antunes; (Portugal) Isaías Camará; (Portugal) José Maria Pereira; (Portugal) Serafim Djassi; (Portugal) Diogo Bernardo; (Chile) Marco López; **Hookers**: (Brazil) **Luan Almeida**; (South Africa) Jason Cornelius; (Portugal) Pedro Gouveia; (Portugal) Eduardo Gomes; **Locks**: (Portugal) **Volodymyr Grikh**; (South Africa) Lorenzo Palacio*; (South Africa) Sérgio Moreira*; (Switzerland) Philippe Couto*; (Portugal) Eurico Chichorro; (Portugal) Afonso Boavida	**Backrow**: (Portugal) **Frederico Couto**; (Italy) Giuseppe Piacenza; (Portugal) Manuel Fati; (Portugal) Frederico Silva; (Portugal) Tomás Picado; (Portugal) Pedro Ismael Tavares; (Portugal) Rui Duarte; (Portugal) João Ferreira; **Scrum-halves**: (Portugal) **António Campos**; (France) Reymond Dorian; (Portugal) Tomás Boavida; (Portugal) Francisco Russo; (Portugal) Luís Chança; **Fly-halves**: (Portugal) **José Rodrigues**; (Argentina) Facundo Rodriguez Santillan; (Portugal) João Farinha	**Centres**: (Portugal) **José Lima**; (New Zealand) Hayden Hann; (Portugal) Guilherme Vasconcelos; (Portugal) Francisco Bessa; (Portugal) Diogo Salgado; (Portugal) Rodrigo Urzay Soares; **Wingers**: (Portugal) Edgar Monteiro; (Portugal) José Miguel Carvalho; (Portugal) Harrison Stock; (Portugal) Diego Caeiro; (Portugal) Diogo Custódio; (Portugal) Francisco Costa; (Guinea-Bissau) Felisbelo Vieira*; (Morocco) Zyad Al Achouni*; **Fullbacks**: (Ireland) Elliott Ryan; (Portugal) Rodrigo Sampaio
(c) denotes the team captain, **Bold** denotes internationally capped players.^{*} denotes players qualified to play for Portugal on residency or dual nationality.

The Direito squad for the 2024–25 Campeonato Nacional de Rugby season
**Props**: (Portugal) **David Costa**; (Portugal) **António Prim**; (Portugal) **José Lupi**; (Argentina) Giovanni Ramallo; (Portugal) Luis Lopes; (Portugal) Afonso Tapadinhas; (Portugal) Lourenço Moita; (Portugal) João Pissarra; (Portugal) Leandro Nunes; **Hookers**: (Portugal) **Duarte Diniz**; (Portugal) Afonso Bento; **Locks**: (Portugal) **Duarte Torgal**; (Portugal) **Pedro Ferreira**; (Portugal) João Vital; (Portugal) António Peixoto; (Portugal) Guilherme Valente; (Portugal) Luis Semedo; (Portugal) Henrique Cortes; (Portugal) Duarte Pedro Nunes; (Portugal) Guilherme Spratley	**Backrow**: (Portugal) **Manuel Picão**; (Portugal) **João Granate**; (Portugal) **Pedro Afra Rosa**; (Portugal) Nuno Peixoto; (Portugal) Mateus Ferreira; (Portugal) Sebastião Silva; (Portugal) Diogo Matos; (Portugal) Miguel Romero Rodrigues; (Portugal) Luis Pina; (Portugal) António Mello; (Portugal) Frederico Castello Branco; **Scrum-halves**: (Portugal) **João Dias**; (Argentina) Rafael Iriarte; (Portugal) António Amaral; (Portugal) Duarte Cortes; **Fly-halves**: (Portugal) **Manuel Vareiro**; (Argentina) Ariel Diaz; (Portugal) Tomás Redondo; (Portugal) Francisco Teixeira; (Portugal) Nuno Rocha	**Centres**: (Portugal) **José Maria Vareta**; (Portugal) Francisco Nobre; (Portugal) João Afra Rosa; (Portugal) Manuel Reis; **Wingers**: (Portugal) **Caetano Castelo Branco**; (Portugal) José Ferreira; (Portugal) Francisco Afra Rosa; (Portugal) Duarte Portela; (Portugal) Duarte Matos; (Portugal) João Burnay; (Portugal) Ricardo Mieiro; (Portugal) Francisco Pinto; (Portugal) Martim Dias; **Fullbacks**: (Portugal) João Vaz Antunes; (Portugal) Frederico Roquette
(c) denotes the team captain, **Bold** denotes internationally capped players.^{*} denotes players qualified to play for Portugal on residency or dual nationality.

The Cascais squad for the 2024–25 Campeonato Nacional de Rugby season
**Props**: (Portugal) **Nuno Mascarenhas**; (Argentina) Santiago Gramajo; (Argentina) Ignácio Urueña; (Argentina) Nicolas Griffiths; (Portugal) José Lavos; (Portugal) Duarte Conde; (Portugal) Pedro Lopes; **Hookers**: (Portugal) **Santiago Lopes**; (Argentina) José Martinez; (Portugal) Bernardo Gomes; (Portugal) Alexander Vieira; (Portugal) Gonçalo Marques; **Locks**: (Portugal) **Martim Belo**; (Argentina) Israel Parnas; (Portugal) Alexandre Fonseca Rodrigues; (Portugal) Manuel Barros; (Portugal) António Carvalho Martins; (Portugal) Luis Graça; (Portugal) João Cabaço	**Backrow**: (Portugal) **Salvador Vassalo**; (Portugal) **Francisco Sousa**; (Portugal) Sebastião Petronilho; (Portugal) Gonçalo Carvalho; (Portugal) Francisco Martins; (Portugal) Lourenço Durão; (Portugal) Dinis Pitta; **Scrum-halves**: (England) Noah Nash; (Portugal) Duarte Cardoso; (Portugal) João Consciência; (Portugal) Francisco Carmona e Costa; **Fly-halves**: (Argentina) Santiago Jara	**Centres**: (Romania) **Gabriel Pop***; (Portugal) **António Vidinha**; (Portugal) **Francisco Vassalo**; (Portugal) Francisco C. Campos; **Wingers**: (Portugal) Vasco Durão; (Portugal) José Villar Gomes; (Portugal) António Sousa; (Portugal) Luis Ferros; (Portugal) Duarte Tavares; (Portugal) Francisco Pissarra; **Fullbacks**: (Portugal) Vasco Correia; (Portugal) Alfredo Almeida
(c) denotes the team captain, **Bold** denotes internationally capped players.^{*} denotes players qualified to play for Portugal on residency or dual nationality.

The CDUL squad for the 2024–25 Campeonato Nacional de Rugby season
**Props**: (Brazil) **Matheus Rocha**; (Portugal) **Miguel Vilaça**; (Argentina) Mateo Miserez; (New Zealand) Toby Taylor; (Portugal) António Maltez; (Portugal) José Almeida; (Portugal) Gonçalo Madaleno; (Portugal) Gonçalo Alves; (Portugal) Manuel Magriço; **Hookers**: (Portugal) **Duarte Foro**; (Portugal) Francisco Pedro; (Portugal) Samuel Marques; **Locks**: (Portugal) **Duarte Gil**; (Portugal) **Xavier Cerejo**; (Portugal) Francisco Almeida; (Portugal) Rui Amador; (Portugal) Raul Conceição; (Portugal) Diogo D'Almeida; (Portugal) Domingos Gonçalves	**Backrow**: (Portugal) **Vasco Baptista**; (Portugal) **José Roque**; (Australia) Ben Grant; (Portugal) Eduardo Queiroz; (Portugal) Afonso Sousa; (Portugal) Rodrigo Oliveira; (Portugal) Francisco Figueiredo; (Portugal) José Libano Monteiro; (Portugal) David Gracioso; (Portugal) Nuno Macedo; (Portugal) Eduardo Queiroz; (Portugal) Francisco Tavares; **Scrum-halves**: (Portugal) **Francisco Magalhães**; (Portugal) Vasco Félix António; (Portugal) Martim Domingues; **Fly-halves**: (Portugal) **Nuno Penha Costa**; (Portugal) Pedro Neiva Correia; (Portugal) António Nuncio; (Portugal) Faustino Gama; (Portugal) Pedro Anahory; (Portugal) Lourenço Cardoso; (Portugal) José Cerejo	**Centres**: (Portugal) **Tomás Appleton**; (Portugal) **Francisco Appleton**; (Argentina) Ignacio Albornoz; (Portugal) Nuno Macedo; (Portugal) Bernardo Matos; (Portugal) Martim Faro; (Portugal) Afonso Alvarez; (Portugal) Tomé Lobo; **Wingers**: (Portugal) **Fabio Conceiçao**; (Portugal) **Tomás Noronha**; (Portugal) Duarte Duarte; (Portugal) Bernardo Matos; (Portugal) João Cardoso; (Portugal) Hussein Sacoor; (Portugal) Guilherme Oliveira; (Portugal) Manuel Salgado; **Fullbacks**: (Portugal) **Jorge Abecasis**; (South Africa) Shane Van Rooyen; (New Zealand) Josh Honey; (Portugal) José Valadas; (Portugal) Pedro Roldão; (Portugal) Sebastião Stilwell
(c) denotes the team captain, **Bold** denotes internationally capped players.^{*} denotes players qualified to play for Portugal on residency or dual nationality.

The Académica squad for the 2024–25 Campeonato Nacional de Rugby season
**Props**: (Brazil) **Alexandre Alves**; (New Zealand) Niko Manaena; (Portugal) Afonso Machado; (Portugal) André Gonçalves; (Portugal) João Claúdio Dos Santos; **Hookers**: (Portugal) **João Mateus**; (Argentina) Ignacio Failla; (Portugal) João Aguiar; **Locks**: (Portugal) **Sérgio Duarte Franco**; (Brazil) **Matheus Wolf**; (Brazil) **Diogo Paixão Santos**; (South Africa) Jacques Van Aardt; (Brazil) Artur Lima; (Portugal) Guilherme Coelho; (Portugal) Gonçalo Costa; (Portugal) Daniel Almeida; (Portugal) Francisco Teles	**Backrow**: (Australia) Luke Ratcliff; (Portugal) Francisco Silva; (Portugal) Eurico Leitão; (Portugal) Miguel André; (Portugal) Francisco Rovira; (Portugal) Miguel Prata; (Portugal) Lourenço Freitas; (Portugal) Afonso Cabral; **Scrum-halves**: (Portugal) Silvio Costa; (Portugal) José Fernandes; **Fly-halves**: (South Africa) Ron McCrimmon; (Portugal) Nuno Cardoso; (Portugal) Tiago Girão	**Centres**: (Brazil) **Moisés Duque**; (Australia) Marcus Arrindell; (Portugal) Francisco Migueis; (Portugal) Gonçalo Ramos; (Portugal) Nuno Fernandes; **Wingers**: (Portugal) **João Diogo Silva**; (New Zealand) Ceiza James; (Portugal) João Dinis; (Portugal) Edson Paulino; (Portugal) Afonso Monteiro; (Portugal) João Cunha; (Portugal) António Pinto Costa; (Portugal) Miguel Cristóvão; (Portugal) David Tender Gomes; **Fullbacks**: (Argentina) Nicolas Vega; (Portugal) Joaquim Couto; (Portugal) Tiago Pintão
(c) denotes the team captain, **Bold** denotes internationally capped players.^{*} denotes players qualified to play for Portugal on residency or dual nationality.

The São Miguel squad for the 2024–25 Campeonato Nacional de Rugby season
**Props**: (Fiji) **Robert Delai**; (Argentina) Thomas Goyochea; (Argentina) Matias Bueso; (South Africa) Juninho Patricio; (Portugal) Pedro Botelho; (Portugal) Tiago Quitério; **Hookers**: (Portugal) Miguel Seoane; **Locks**: (Brazil) **Felipe Rosa**; (Portugal) Pedro Oliveira; (Portugal) Miguel Máximo; (Portugal) Simão Medeiro	**Backrow**: (South Africa) Sabata Mokhachane; (Portugal) Gonçalo Melo Ribeiro; (Portugal) Manuel de Almeida; (Portugal) Sebastião Petronilho; **Scrum-halves**: (Portugal) Lourenço Ribeiro; (Portugal) Tomás Trincheiras; **Fly-halves**: (Germany) **Bader Pretorius**; (Argentina) Agustin Altamirano; (Portugal) Francisco Teixeira	**Centres**: (Spain) **Ignácio Vega**; (Zimbabwe) Bright Matimba; (Portugal) Tomás Morais; (Portugal) Lourenço Chambel; (Portugal) João Tavares; **Wingers**: (South Africa) Allistair Mumba; (Portugal) Duarte Branquinho; (Portugal) Ricardo Rosa; (Portugal) Rivaldo Pinto; (Portugal) Leandro Ceita; (Portugal) Francisco Cardoso; (Portugal) Francisco Reis; (Portugal) João Ruivo; (Portugal) Jorge Anjinho; **Fullbacks**: (Belgium) **Hugo Ruelle**; (Italy) Andrea Ragno; (Portugal) Miguel Martins
(c) denotes the team captain, **Bold** denotes internationally capped players.^{*} denotes players qualified to play for Portugal on residency or dual nationality.

The RC Lousã squad for the 2024–25 Campeonato Nacional de Rugby season
**Props**: (Spain) Yeray Pastoriza Carrasco; (Argentina) Isaias Such; (Georgia (country)) Nika Beroshvili; (Denmark) Mark Mammen; (Portugal) Paulo Marques; (Portugal) Bruno Pereira; **Hookers**: (England) Fynn Smail; (England) Scott Cunnigham; (Portugal) Rafael Pacurar; **Locks**: (Portugal) Ricardo Reis; (Portugal) Bruno Santos; (Portugal) Bruno Pinheiro; (Portugal) Diogo Forte	**Backrow**: (Argentina) Gonzalo Poblete; (Portugal) Augusto Andrade; (Portugal) José Caetano; (Portugal) Henrique Batista; (Portugal) Eduardo Heredia; (Portugal) João Barreto; (Portugal) Diogo Graça; (Portugal) Leonardo Pinto; **Scrum-halves**: (Ireland) Cirian Roberts; (Portugal) Pedro Dias dos Santos; (Portugal) Tomás Batista; **Fly-halves**: (Argentina) Bruno Balatti	**Centres**: (Netherlands) Mika Zetzema; (Argentina) Agustín Alabos; **Wingers**: (Portugal) João Campos; (Portugal) Francisco Caetano; (Portugal) Gonçalo Graça; (Portugal) Diogo Santos; **Fullbacks**: (Portugal) Manuel Nogueira; (Portugal) Guilherme Costa
(c) denotes the team captain, **Bold** denotes internationally capped players.^{*} denotes players qualified to play for Portugal on residency or dual nationality.

The CDUP squad for the 2024–25 Campeonato Nacional de Rugby season
**Props**: (Wales) Tom Kaijaks; (Portugal) Ricardo Husgen Lanhoso; (Portugal) Bernardo Coelho; (Portugal) Diogo Amaro; (Portugal) Henrique Freitas; **Hookers**: (Portugal) Nuno Figueiredo; (Portugal) António Terroso; **Locks**: (Portugal) Gonçalo Seruca; (Portugal) Tiago Albuquerque; (Portugal) Rodrigo Mateus; (Portugal) Luis Moreira; (Portugal) Henrique Vieira; (Portugal) Gonçalo Santos; (Portugal) Afonso Santos	**Backrow**: (Argentina) Facundo Ojeda; (France) Julien Adamski; (Portugal) João Duarte; (Portugal) António Pires; (Portugal) Henrique Santos; (Portugal) Vasco Sarmento; **Scrum-halves**: (Portugal) **João Belo**; (Portugal) Manuel Mendonça; **Fly-halves**: (Portugal) Tiago Rocha; (Portugal) Luis Agrelos; (Portugal) Bernardo Nogueira	**Centres**: (Portugal) Tomás Marrana; (Portugal) Miguel Trepa; (Portugal) Guilherme Brandão; (Portugal) Eduardo Moreira; **Wingers**: (Argentina) Rodrigo Gauna; (Ukraine) Ihor Lutsenko; (Portugal) Salvador Cardoso; (Portugal) Tomás Ferronha; (Portugal) Lucas Velo; (Portugal) Afonso Aguiar; (Portugal) José Diogo; **Fullbacks**: (Portugal) **Nuno Sousa Guedes**; (Portugal) Nuno Maia; (Portugal) Sebastião Leite
(c) denotes the team captain, **Bold** denotes internationally capped players.^{*} denotes players qualified to play for Portugal on residency or dual nationality.

The CR Técnico squad for the 2024–25 Campeonato Nacional de Rugby season
**Props**: (Portugal) **André Arrojado**; (Argentina) Mariano Leiva; (Portugal) Diogo Teixeira; (Portugal) Vasco Tavares; (Portugal) João Lobo; **Hookers**: (Portugal) **Rodrigo Bento**; (Portugal) Manuel Barral; **Locks**: (Portugal) **Guilherme Costa**; (Argentina) Valentino Larocca; (Portugal) Afonso Cirilo; (Portugal) Manuel Serrano; (Portugal) Gonçalo Costa; (Portugal) Estevão Baltazar; (Portugal) Alexandre Rosário Silva	**Backrow**: (Argentina) José Guillen; (Argentina) Tomas Suárez; (Argentina) Agustin Arburua; (Brazil) Caio Almeida; (France) Léon L'Huillier; (Portugal) Francisco Silva; (Portugal) João D'Orey; (Portugal) Pedro Nunes; **Scrum-halves**: (Portugal) **Pedro Lucas**; (Portugal) Francisco Pedro; (Portugal) Rodrigo Henriques; **Fly-halves**: (Argentina) Simón Walker; (South Africa) Conor Van Eden; (Portugal) Hugo Trigueiro	**Centres**: (Argentina) Renato Abad; (Argentina) Nicolas Marzano; (France) Alexis Delprat; (Portugal) Miguel Rosa; (Portugal) António Cardoso; **Wingers**: (Portugal) Francisco Salgado; (Portugal) Francisco Lacerda; (Portugal) Henrique Lacerda; **Fullbacks**: (Argentina) Matias Bascary; (Portugal) Manuel Vallêra; (Portugal) Francisco Vallêra; (Portugal) Nuno Fradinho
(c) denotes the team captain, **Bold** denotes internationally capped players.^{*} denotes players qualified to play for Portugal on residency or dual nationality.

The RC Montemor squad for the 2024–25 Campeonato Nacional de Rugby season
**Props**: (Argentina) Franco Dellamea; (Argentina) Gerônimo Gomez; (Portugal) António Mendes; (Portugal) António Veiga Malta; **Hookers**: (Argentina) Fabian Contreras; (Georgia (country)) Giorgi Tsverava; **Locks**: (Portugal) João Barbado; (Portugal) Manuel Marques dos Santos; (Portugal) António Mendes; (Portugal) João Potier; (Portugal) Francisco Passareiro	**Backrow**: (Portugal) José Pinto Gouveia; (Portugal) João Camelo; (Portugal) Luis Marques dos Santos; (Portugal) Manuel Silva Borges; (Portugal) Miguel Cecilio; (Portugal) João Redondo; (Portugal) João Vacas de Carvalho; **Scrum-halves**: (Portugal) Afonso Antunes; (Portugal) Augusto Mira; **Fly-halves**: (Portugal) Miguel Casadinho; (Portugal) Simão Costa Pereira	**Centres**: (Argentina) Júlio Piñeda; (Portugal) Pedro Silva Borges; (Portugal) Rodrigo Pereira; (Portugal) Miguel Rosa; (Portugal) António Redondo; **Wingers**: (Portugal) Francisco Mira; (Portugal) Luis Santos Jorge; (Portugal) Gonçalo Silva; (Portugal) Pedro Tigre; **Fullbacks**: (Argentina) Agustín Iza; (Portugal) José Vacas de Carvalho
(c) denotes the team captain, **Bold** denotes internationally capped players.^{*} denotes players qualified to play for Portugal on residency or dual nationality.

== See also ==
- 2024–25 Premiership Rugby
- 2024–25 Top 14 season
- 2024–25 Rugby Pro D2 season
- 2024–25 European Rugby Champions Cup
- 2024–25 EPCR Challenge Cup
- 2024–25 Premiership Rugby Cup
- 2024–25 RFU Championship
- 2024–25 United Rugby Championship
