= Portuguese Rugby Super Cup =

- Founded: 1988; 37 years ago
- Region: Portugal
- Teams: 2
- Current champions: CF Belenenses (9th title)
- Most championships: Direito (12 titles)
- 2024 Portuguese Rugby Super Cup

The Supertaça de Portugal de Rugby (English: Portuguese Rugby Super Cup) is a Portuguese national rugby union organized by the Portuguese Rugby Federation, and disputed by the winners of national championship and Portuguese cup.

Belenenses are the current holders.

== Supertaça de Portugal finals ==
Ed.	Season	Winner	Score	Runner-up
1ª	1988	AA Coimbra (1)	16-10	SL Benfica
2ª	1989	CDUL (1)	57-3	CF Belenenses
3ª	1990	CDUL (2)	21-7	AA Coimbra
4ª	1991	GDS Cascais (1)	47-3	SL Benfica
5ª	1992	GDS Cascais (2)	57-12	SL Benfica
6ª	1993	GDS Cascais (3)	32-6	CDUL
7ª	1994	C. R. Técnico	17-8	GDS Cascais
8ª	1995	GDS Cascais (4)	34-10	AA Coimbra
9ª	1996	AA Coimbra (2)	20-14	GDS Cascais
10ª	1997	GDS Cascais (5)	29-3	AA Coimbra
11ª	1998	Agronomia (1)	17-12	C. R. Técnico
12ª	1999	Direito (1)	30-19	Agronomia
13ª	2000	Direito (2)	23-13	Agronomia
14ª	2001	CF Belenenses (1)	24-8	SL Benfica
15ª	2002	Direito (3)	25-7	Agronomia
16ª	2003	CF Belenenses (2)	41-12	CDUP
17ª	2004	Direito (4)	50-7	AA Coimbra
18ª	2005	CF Belenenses (3)	18-16	Direito
19ª	2006	Direito (5)	33-25	Agronomia
20ª	2007	Agronomia (2)	25-14	CDUP
21ª	2008	Direito (6)	39-3	CF Belenenses
22ª	2009	Direito (7)	16-6	Agronomia
23ª	2010	Direito (8)	26-23	Agronomia
24ª	2011	Agronomia (3)	35-10	Direito
25ª	2012	CDUL (3)	45-11	Agronomia
26ª	2013	Direito (9)	14-8	CDUL
27ª	2014	Direito (10)	33-15	CDUL
28ª	2015	Direito (11)	19-7	CDUL
29ª	2016	Agronomia (4)	17-9	Direito
30ª	2017	Agronomia (5)	29-10	CDUL
31ª	2018	CF Belenenses (4)	30-20	AA Coimbra
32ª	2019	CF Belenenses (5)	46-3	Agronomia
--	2020	Not played		
33ª	2021	CF Belenenses (6)	25-15	C. R. Técnico
34ª	2022	CF Belenenses (7)	32-18	Agronomia
35ª	2023	Direito (12)	39-6	CDUL
36ª	2024	CF Belenenses (8)	32-30	Agronomia
37ª	2025	CF Belenenses (9)	24-14	CDUL

=== Performance by club ===
Club	Titles	Years won
Direito	12	1999, 2000, 2002, 2004, 2006, 2008, 2009, 2010, 2013, 2014, 2015, 2023
CF Belenenses	9	2001, 2003, 2005, 2018, 2019, 2021, 2022, 2024, 2025
Agronomia	5	1998, 2007, 2011, 2016, 2017
GDS Cascais	5	1991, 1992, 1993, 1995, 1997
CDUL	3	1989, 1990, 2012
AA Coimbra	2	1988, 1996
C. R. Técnico	1	1994

== See also ==
- Rugby union in Portugal
- Campeonato Português de Rugby
- Portuguese Rugby Cup
