= Nuno Sousa Guedes =

Portuguese rugby union player

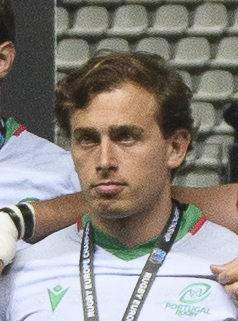
- Born: 21 November 1994 (age 31)
- Height: 1.77 m (5 ft 10 in)
- Weight: 80 kg (176 lb)

Rugby union career
- Position: Fullback
International career
Years	Team	Apps	(Points)
2016–	Portugal	24	(104)
National sevens team
Years	Team		Comps
2012–	Portugal		89 (229 pts)

Nuno Maria Ramos Pinto Sousa Guedes (born Porto, 21 November 1994) is a Portuguese rugby union player. He plays as a fullback.

== Club career ==
He first played for Associação Prazer de Jogar Rugby, in his hometown of Porto. He moved afterwards to CDUP, where he played from 2012/13 to 2013/14. He moved again to Grupo Desportivo Direito, where he would play for four seasons, from 2014/15 to 2017/18, winning twice the Campeonato Português de Rugby, in 2014/15 and 2015/16, and the Portuguese Rugby Cup in 2015/16. He also won the Copa Ibérica de Rugby in 2015. He stayed at Northern Suburbs Rugby Club, in Sydney, in 2019, at the semi-professional Shute Shield, playing in 5 games and scoring 3 tries. He returned to CDUP, in 2019/20, where he has been playing since then.

== International career ==
He has 24 caps for Portugal, since 2016, with 5 tries, 23 conversions and 11 penalties scored, 104 points on aggregate. He had his first cap at the 39–14 loss to Romania, at 6 February 2016, in Cluj, for the Six Nations B, aged 21 years old. He has been a regular player and one of the top scorers for the "Lobos" since then. He won with the national team the 2017–18 Rugby Europe Trophy.

Guedes competed for Portugal at the 2022 Rugby World Cup Sevens in Cape Town.
