= C.F. Os Belenenses (rugby union) =

Portuguese rugby union team

Belenenses Rugby
- Full name: Clube de Futebol «Os Belenenses»
- Union: Portuguese Rugby Federation
- Founded: 30 December 1928 (97 years ago)
- Location: Lisbon, Portugal
- Ground: Belenenses Rugby Park
- Chairman: André Cunha
- League: Campeonato Português de Rugby
- 2023-24: 1st
Team kit

Belenenses is a professional Portuguese rugby union team. Apart from winning several titles as a team, they have also provided five players to the National Team that played at the 2007 Rugby World Cup finals. Their most recent title was the victory in the National Championship of the 2024/2025 season.

== Honours ==
- Campeonato Nacional Honra/Super Bock:
  - Winner (10): 1958/59, 1962/63, 1972/73, 1974/75, 2002/03, 2007/08, 2017/18, 2021/22, 2023/24, 2024/25
- Portuguese Cup:
  - Winner (6): 1958/59, 1963/64, 2000/01, 2018/19, 2020/21, 2021/22
- Portuguese Super Cup:
  - Winners (10): 2001, 2003, 2005, 2018, 2019, 2021, 2022, 2024, 2025, 2026
- Taça Ibérica:
  - Winner (2): 2022/23, 2025/26

== Current squad ==
Information based on Portuguese Rugby Federation

The Belenenses squad for the 2026–27 Super XV season
**Props**: (Portugal) **Manuel Worm**; (Argentina) Luciano Torres; (Germany) Christoph Obenaus; (Portugal) Frederico Simões; (Portugal) Joaquim Cunha; (Portugal) Manuel Baptista; (Portugal) Salvador Carvalho; (Portugal) Vicente Gomes; **Hookers**: (Argentina) Guillermo Lawrie; (Portugal) Miguel Nunes^{LUS}; (Portugal) Diogo Ribeiro; **Locks**: (Samoa) **Jay Tuivaiti**; (England) Ollie Grobler; (Portugal) José Moreira; (Portugal) Francisco Simões; (Portugal) Martim Ferreira; (Portugal) António Andrade	**Backrow**: (Portugal) **David Wallis**^{LUS}; (Portugal) **Vasco Baptista**^{LUS}; (Portugal) **André Cunha**^{LUS}; (Portugal) Manuel Pinto^{LUS}; (Ireland) André Birdthistle; (Portugal) Tomás Sequeira (c); (Portugal) Pedro Andrade; **Scrum-halves**: (Portugal) **Duarte Azevedo**^{LUS}; (Portugal) João Menéres; **Fly-halves**: (Portugal) Francisco Menéres^{LUS}; (Portugal) António Menéres; (Portugal) Manuel Menéres	**Three-quarters**: (Portugal) **José Paiva dos Santos**^{LUS}; (Portugal) **Duarte Moreira**^{LUS}; (Portugal) **Diogo Rodrigues**^{LUS}; (Wales) Owen Jenkins; (Fiji) Filimoni Waqainabete; (Portugal) Lourenço Pedras; (Portugal) Gonçalo Santos; (Portugal) Francisco Galveias; (Portugal) Martim Azevedo; (Portugal) Rodrigo Cardoso; (Portugal) Bernardo Macedo; **Fullbacks**: (Portugal) Salvador da Cunha Jr.^{LUS}; (Portugal) Guilherme Marques
(c) denotes the team captain, **Bold** denotes internationally capped players. ^{LUS} denotes Lusitanos capped players.^{*} denotes players qualified to play for Portugal on residency or dual nationality.

== Previous squads ==
According to Portuguese Rugby Federation

The Belenenses squad for the 2025–26 Campeonato Nacional de Rugby season
**Props**: (Czech Republic) **Anthony Kent**^{LUS}; (Spain) **Joaquin Dominguez**; (Chile) **Lucas Bordigoni**; (Portugal) **Manuel Worm**; (Portugal) Bernardo Veiga; (Portugal) Manuel Baptista; **Hookers**: (Argentina) Guillermo Lawrie; (Portugal) Miguel Nunes^{LUS}; (Portugal) Diogo Norton; **Locks**: (Uruguay) **Ignacio Dotti**; (Portugal) **Salvador da Cunha**^{LUS}; (Portugal) José Moreira; (Portugal) Francisco Simões; (Portugal) Tomás da Cunha; (Portugal) Martim Ferreira	**Backrow**: (Portugal) **Rafael Simões**^{LUS}; (Portugal) **David Wallis**^{LUS}; (Portugal) **Vasco Baptista**^{LUS}; (Portugal) **André Cunha**^{LUS}; (Portugal) Manuel Pinto^{LUS}; (Portugal) Tomás Sequeira; (Portugal) Frederico Simões; (Portugal) Sebastião da Cunha; (Portugal) Diogo Raposo; (Portugal) Pedro Cunha; (Portugal) Lourenço Cunha; **Scrum-halves**: (Portugal) **Duarte Azevedo**^{LUS}; (Portugal) Francisco Macedo; (Portugal) João Menéres; **Fly-halves**: (Portugal) Francisco Menéres^{LUS}; (Portugal) António Menéres; (Portugal) Manuel Menéres	**Three-quarters**: (Portugal) **José Paiva dos Santos**^{LUS}; (Portugal) **Duarte Moreira**^{LUS}; (Portugal) **Diogo Rodrigues**^{LUS}; (Wales) Owen Jenkins; (Australia) Jordan Paes Bacon^{*}^{LUS}; (Australia) Samuel Paes Bacon^{*}^{LUS}; (New Zealand) Alex Thrupp; (Argentina) Ignacio Migliore; (Portugal) Lourenço Pedras; (Portugal) Gonçalo Santos; (Portugal) Tomás Monteiro; (Portugal) Francisco Galveias; (Portugal) Tomás Reis; (Portugal) João H. de Melo; **Fullbacks**: (Portugal) Salvador da Cunha Jr.^{LUS}; (Portugal) Francisco Murta
(c) denotes the team captain, **Bold** denotes internationally capped players. ^{LUS} denotes Lusitanos capped players.^{*} denotes players qualified to play for Portugal on residency or dual nationality.

The Belenenses squad for the 2024–25 Campeonato Nacional de Rugby season
**Props**: (Czech Republic) **Anthony Kent**; (Spain) **Joaquin Dominguez**; (Chile) **Lucas Bordigoni**; (Portugal) **Manuel Worm**; (Portugal) Frederico Simões; (Portugal) Pedro Braga; (Portugal) Bernardo Veiga; **Hookers**: (Argentina) Guillermo Lawrie; (Portugal) Miguel Nunes; **Locks**: (Portugal) **Salvador da Cunha**; (Portugal) Manuel Lima; (Portugal) José Moreira; (Portugal) Francisco Simões; (Portugal) António Andrade; (Portugal) Tomás da Cunha; (Portugal) Martim Ferreira	**Backrow**: (Portugal) **Rafael Simões**; (Portugal) **David Wallis**; (Portugal) **André Cunha**; (Portugal) Manuel Pinto; (Portugal) Pedro Cunha; (Portugal) Tomás Sequeira; (Portugal) Sebastião da Cunha; (Portugal) Diogo Raposo; **Scrum-halves**: (Portugal) **Duarte Azevedo**; (Portugal) Francisco Macedo; **Fly-halves**: (Portugal) Francisco Menéres; (Portugal) Manuel Menéres	**Centres**: (Portugal) **Rodrigo Fruedenthal**; (New Zealand) Alex Thrupp; (Portugal) Lourenço Pedras; (Portugal) António Cunha; (Portugal) António Claro; (Portugal) Gonçalo Santos; (Portugal) Tomás Monteiro; **Wingers**: (Portugal) **José Paiva dos Santos**; (Portugal) **Duarte Moreira**; (Wales) Owen Jenkins; (Portugal) Diogo Rodrigues; (Portugal) Francisco Galveias; (Portugal) Lourenço Pedras; (Portugal) Tomás Reis; **Fullbacks**: (Portugal) Francisco Murta; (Portugal) Salvador da Cunha Jr.
(c) denotes the team captain, **Bold** denotes internationally capped players.^{*} denotes players qualified to play for Portugal on residency or dual nationality.
