= AEIS Agronomia =

Agronomia
- Full name: Associação de Estudantes do Instituto Superior de Agronomia
- Founded: 1935; 91 years ago
- Ground: Tapada da Ajuda
- Coach: Murray Cox
- League: Campeonato Nacional Honra/Super Bock
- 2018/19: 1st
Team kit

Associação de Estudantes do Instituto Superior de Agronomia or Agronomia is a Portuguese multisports club for Instituto Superior de Agronomia students. Agronomia has won two Campeonato Nacional Honra/Super Bock and nine Taça de Portugal de Rugby. It is one of the oldest rugby clubs in Portugal. Three players had represented the club at the 2007 Rugby World Cup finals.

On 18 February 2012 the club won the Taça de Portugal de Rugby for the ninth time.

== Achievements ==
- Campeonato Nacional Honra/Super Bock:
  - Winner (2): 2006–2007, 2018/19
- Taça de Portugal de Rugby:
  - Winner (10):1978, 1998, 1999, 2000, 2006, 2009, 2010, 2011, 2012, 2017
- Taça Ibérica:
  - Winner (1):2008
- Supertaça de Portugal de Rugby:
  - Winner (4):1998, 2007, 2011, 2016

== Current squad ==
Information based on Portuguese Rugby Federation

The Agronomia squad for the 2026–27 Super XV season
**Props**: (Uruguay) **Santiago Cagnone**; (Argentina) Rodrigo Correa; (Chile) **Fabián Figueroa**; (Argentina) Mariano Gracia; (Portugal) Salvador Oostergettel; (Portugal) António Quiroga; (Portugal) Luís Souto Barreiros; (Portugal) Nicolau Turabelidze^{LUS}; **Hookers**: (Portugal) Bernardo Cardoso; (Portugal) Hugo Oliveira; (Portugal) Joaquim Raimundo; (Portugal) Eduardo Uva; (Portugal) **Pedro Vicente**^{LUS}; **Locks**: (Portugal) Bernardo Barreiros Cardoso; (Portugal) Pedro Herédia; (Portugal) **António Rebelo de Andrade**^{LUS}; (Portugal) **José Rebelo de Andrade**^{LUS}; (Argentina) Tobias Ruffino Jenks; (Portugal) Simão Salgueiro	**Backrow**: (Portugal) Francisco Cabral (c)^{LUS}; (Portugal) João P. Fernandes; (Portugal) Manuel Navalhinhas; (Portugal) José Ramalho; (Argentina) Guido Riva; (Portugal) Diogo Sarmento^{LUS}; (Portugal) Duarte Vasco Costa; **Scrum-halves**: (Portugal) Duarte Alves; (Portugal) **Tomás Amado**^{LUS}; (Portugal) João Bandeiras; (Portugal) Frederico Barbosa; (Portugal) José Maria Vacas de Carvalho; **Fly-halves**: (Portugal) **Domingos Cabral**^{LUS}; (Portugal) José Maria Cunha; (Argentina) Juan de la Cruz Molina; (Portugal) Simão Sousa	**Centres**: (Portugal) Salvador Botelho; (Portugal) José do Carmo Câmara; (Portugal) Vasco Câmara; (Portugal) João Castro; (Portugal) Manuel Ramalho; **Wingers**: (Portugal) António Cortes Pena Monteiro; (Portugal) José Cortes Pena Monteiro; (Portugal) Eduardo Leite; (Portugal) Vasco Leite^{LUS}; (Portugal) Pedro Ribeiro; **Fullbacks**: (Portugal) **Manuel Cardoso Pinto**^{LUS}; (Portugal) Luís Herédia; (Ireland) Ciarán Roberts; (Portugal) Gonçalo Vasco Costa
(c) denotes the team captain, **Bold** denotes internationally capped players. ^{LUS} denotes Lusitanos capped players.

== Previous squads ==
According to Portuguese Rugby Federation

The Agronomia squad for the 2025–26 Campeonato Nacional de Rugby season
**Props**: (Portugal) Francisco Domingues^{LUS}; (Portugal) Daniel Cabral; (Argentina) Rodrigo Correa; (New Zealand) Hayze Nepia; (Australia) Dante Santos^{*}; (Angola) Abraão Ambrósio^{*}; (Portugal) Nicolau Turabelidze^{LUS}; (Portugal) Luís Souto Barreiros; (Portugal) Salvador Oostergettel; (Portugal) António Quiroga; (Portugal) Diogo Carvalho; **Hookers**: (Portugal) **Pedro Vicente**^{LUS}; (Portugal) Hugo Oliveira; (Portugal) Joaquim Raimundo; (Portugal) Bernardo Cardoso; (Portugal) Eduardo Uva; **Locks**: (Portugal) **José Rebelo de Andrade**^{LUS}; (Portugal) **António Rebelo de Andrade**^{LUS}; (New Zealand) Manase Taufa; (Portugal) Pedro Herédia; (Portugal) Bernardo B. Cardoso; (Portugal) Simão Salgueiro; (Portugal) Manuel Bação; (Portugal) Luís Rodolfo; (Portugal) António Maria Andrade; (Portugal) Vasco Queiroz	**Backrow**: (New Zealand) Tevyn Anitelea; (New Zealand) Joshua Retter; (Portugal) Francisco Cabral (c)^{LUS}; (Portugal) Diogo Sarmento^{LUS}; (Portugal) Manuel Navalhinhas; (Portugal) João P. Fernandes; (Portugal) Francisco Uva; (Portugal) Vicente Guerra Pinto; (Portugal) Duarte Vasco Costa; (Portugal) João Louro; (Portugal) José Ramalho; **Scrum-halves**: (Portugal) **Tomás Amado**^{LUS}; (Portugal) Duarte Alves; (Portugal) Frederico Barbosa; **Fly-halves**: (Belgium) **Hugo de Franq**; (Portugal) **Domingos Cabral**^{LUS}; (Portugal) Simão Sousa; (Portugal) José Maria Cunha	**Centres and wingers**: (Portugal) **Vasco Ribeiro**^{LUS}; (Canada) **D'Shawn Bowen**; (Portugal) Vasco Leite^{LUS}; (Portugal) Sebastião Cardoso; (Portugal) José do Carmo Câmara; (Portugal) Bernardo Valente; (Portugal) Manuel Ramalho; (Portugal) José Cortes Pena Monteiro; (Portugal) Vasco Câmara; (Portugal) António Pena Monteiro; (Portugal) Pedro Ribeiro; (Portugal) Rodrigo Castanheira; (Portugal) Eduardo Leite; (Portugal) Salvador Botelho; (Portugal) João Castro; (Portugal) Salvador Cabral; **Fullbacks**: (Portugal) **Manuel Cardoso Pinto**^{LUS}; (Ireland) Ciarán Roberts; (Portugal) Gonçalo Vasco Costa; (Portugal) Afonso Vinagre; (Portugal) Luís Herédia
(c) denotes the team captain, **Bold** denotes internationally capped players. ^{LUS} denotes Lusitanos capped players.^{*} denotes players qualified to play for Portugal on residency or dual nationality.

The Agronomia squad for the 2024–25 Campeonato Nacional de Rugby season
**Props**: (Portugal) **Abel da Cunha**; (Paraguay) **Estéfano Aranda Cáceres**; (Argentina) Rodrigo Correa; (Angola) Abraão Ambrósio^{*}; (Portugal) Francisco Domingues; (Portugal) Afonso Carreira; (Portugal) Nicolau Turabelidze; (Portugal) António Quiroga; **Hookers**: (Portugal) **Pedro Vicente**; (Portugal) Frederico Tenório; (Portugal) Francisco Cabral; (Portugal) Diogo Carvalho; (Portugal) Hugo Oliveira; (Portugal) Joaquim Raimundo; (Portugal) Bernardo Cardoso; **Locks**: (Portugal) **José Rebelo de Andrade**; (Portugal) **António Rebelo de Andrade**; (Portugal) Pedro Herédia; (Portugal) Bernardo B. Cardoso; (Portugal) Simão Salgueiro; (Portugal) Manuel Bação; (Portugal) Luís Rodolfo; (Portugal) António Maria Andrade	**Backrow**: (Portugal) Francisco Cabral; (Portugal) Manuel Navalhinhas; (Portugal) João P. Fernandes; (Portugal) Francisco Uva; (Portugal) Diogo Sarmento; (Portugal) Vicente Guerra Pinto; (Portugal) Duarte Vasco Costa; (Portugal) João Louro; (Portugal) Francisco Piano Gonçalves; (Portugal) José Ramalho; **Scrum-halves**: (Chile) **Nicolas Herreros**; (Portugal) João Bandeiras; (Portugal) Tomás Amado; (Portugal) Duarte Alves; **Fly-halves**: (Belgium) **Hugo de Franq**; (Portugal) **Domingos Cabral**; (Portugal) Simão Sousa	**Centres**: (Portugal) **João Lima**; (Portugal) **Vasco Ribeiro**; (Portugal) Vasco Leite; (Portugal) Armand Patricio; (Portugal) Sebastião Cardoso; (Portugal) José do Carmo Câmara; (Portugal) Bernardo Valente; (Portugal) Manuel Ramalho; **Wingers**: (Portugal) José Cortes Pena Monteiro; (Portugal) José Carmo Câmara; (Portugal) Vasco Câmara; (Portugal) António Pena Monteiro; (Portugal) Pedro Ribeiro; (Portugal) Rodrigo Castanheira; (Portugal) Eduardo Leite; (Portugal) Salvador Botelho; (Portugal) João Castro; **Fullbacks**: (Portugal) **Manuel Cardoso Pinto**; (Portugal) Gonçalo Vasco Costa
(c) denotes the team captain, **Bold** denotes internationally capped players.^{*} denotes players qualified to play for Portugal on residency or dual nationality.

The Agronomia squad for the 2023–24 TOP 10 season
**Props**: (Georgia (country)) Giorgi Turabelidze; (Argentina) Luis Carranza; (Portugal) Francisco Domingues; (Portugal) Gil Buchinho; (Portugal) Nicolau Turabelidze; **Hookers**: (Portugal) **Pedro Vicente**; (Argentina) José Nicolás Gea; (Argentina) Mariano Muntaner; (Portugal) Frederico Tenório; (Portugal) Bernardo Cardoso; **Locks**: (Portugal) **José Rebelo de Andrade**; (Portugal) Pedro Herédia; (Portugal) António Maria Andrade; (Portugal) Bernardo B. Cardoso; (Portugal) António Rebelo de Andrade	**Backrow**: (Netherlands) **Wolf Van Djick**; (New Zealand) Xavier Mccorkindale; (Portugal) Francisco Cabral; (Portugal) Manuel Navalhinhas; (Portugal) Francisco Uva; (Portugal) Diogo Sarmento; (Portugal) Vicente Pinto; **Scrum-halves**: (Chile) **Nicolas Herreros**; (Portugal) João Bandeiras; **Fly-halves**: (Belgium) **Hugo de Franq**; (Portugal) **Domingos Cabral**; (Portugal) **João Lima**; (New Zealand) Kane Hancy	**Centres**: (Portugal) **José Lima**; (Portugal) **Vasco Ribeiro**; (Portugal) Vasco Leite; (Portugal) Sebastião Cardoso; (Portugal) José Câmara; **Wingers**: (Portugal) **António Cortes**; (Portugal) José Cortes Pena Monteiro; (Portugal) António Pena Monteiro; (Portugal) Pedro Ribeiro; (Portugal) Rodrigo Castanheira; **Fullbacks**: (Portugal) **Manuel Cardoso Pinto**; (Portugal) Afonso Vinagre; (Portugal) Gonçalo Vasco Costa
(c) denotes the team captain, **Bold** denotes internationally capped players.
