= Pedro Lucas (rugby union) =

Portuguese rugby player

- Born: 16 October 2000 (age 26)
- Height: 177 cm (5 ft 10 in)
- Weight: 75 kg (165 lb; 11 st 11 lb)

Rugby union career
- Position: Scrum-half
International career
Years	Team	Apps	(Points)
2020–	Portugal	20	(10)

Pedro Guia Lucas (16 October 2000) is a Portuguese rugby union player. He plays scrum half for Lusitanos XV and Portugal Rugby at international level.

== Club career ==
Lucas has played for C. R. Técnico since 2018, making his debut for the first team at 17 years of age. At 22 he plays for Portuguese franchise Lusitanos XV.

== International career ==
Having represented Portugal at U18 and U20 level, Lucas made his debut for Portugal Rugby in 2020 against Romania and currently has 16 caps.
