= Grupo Dramático e Sportivo Cascais =

GDS Cascais
- Full name: Grupo Dramático e Sportivo Cascais
- Founded: 3 September 1975 (51 years ago)
- Ground: Cascais
- Chairman: José Maria Correia de Sampaio
- Coach(es): Gabriel Ascarate, Roberto Pintado e João Bettencourt (Bico)
- League: Divisão de Honra
- 2011-12: 1st (Promoted)
Team kit

Grupo Dramático e Sportivo Cascais is a sports club founded in 1915. The club also has a Portuguese rugby union team among other sports. The club has won 6 rugby championships, 5 in a row (https://pt.m.wikipedia.org/wiki/Campeonato_Nacional_de_Rugby). The club rugby section was founded in 1975. It had a player, Paulo Murinello, in the Portuguese squad that participated at the 2007 Rugby World Cup finals. It also has a team that plays in Liga Portuguesa de Futsal.

== Honors ==
- Campeonato Nacional Honra/Super Bock:
  - Winner (6): 1986/1987, 1991/1992, 1992/93, 1993/94, 1994/95, 1995/96
- Taça de Portugal de Rugby:
  - Winner (5): 1986/87, 1990/91, 1991/92, 1992/93, 2025/26
- Supertaça de Portugal de Rugby:
  - Winner (5): 1991, 1992, 1993, 1995, 1997
- Taça Ibérica:
  - Winner (3): 1992/93, 1993/94, 1996/97

== Current squad ==
Information based on Portuguese Rugby Federation

The Cascais squad for the 2026–27 Super XV season
**Props**: (Portugal) **José Lavos**^{LUS}; (Argentina) Nicolas Griffiths^{LUS}; (Argentina) José Martinez; (Argentina) Ignácio Urueña; (Portugal) Duarte Conde^{LUS}; **Hookers**: (Portugal) **Santiago Lopes**^{LUS}; (Portugal) **Nuno Mascarenhas**^{LUS}; **Locks**: (Portugal) **Martim Belo**^{LUS}; (Argentina) Israel Parnas; (Portugal) Alexandre Fonseca Rodrigues^{LUS}; (Portugal) Manuel Barros^{LUS}; (Portugal) António Carvalho Martins; (Portugal) Luis Graça	**Backrow**: (Uruguay) **Manuel Ardao**; (Portugal) **Boaventura Almeida**^{LUS}; (Portugal) **Duarte Costa Campos**; (Portugal) Lourenço Durão^{LUS}; (Portugal) Gonçalo Carvalho; (Portugal) Manuel Soares; **Scrum-halves**: (Argentina) Rafael Iriarte; (England) Noah Nash; (Portugal) Francisco Carmona Costa; (Portugal) Tomás Martins; **Fly-halves**: (Argentina) Santiago Jara; (Portugal) Duarte Cardoso^{LUS}	**Three-quarters**: (Portugal) **António Vidinha**^{LUS}; (Portugal) **Francisco Vassalo**; (Ireland) Maximilien Coutts^{*}^{LUS}; (Portugal) Vasco Durão^{LUS}; (Portugal) Francisco C. Campos; (Portugal) José Villar Gomes; (Portugal) António Sousa; (Portugal) Luis Ferros; **Fullbacks**: (Portugal) **Alfredo Almeida**^{LUS}; (Portugal) Vasco Correia^{LUS}; (Portugal) Francisco Pissarra; (Portugal) Henrique Matias
(c) denotes the team captain, **Bold** denotes internationally capped players. ^{LUS} denotes Lusitanos capped players.^{*} denotes players qualified to play for Portugal on residency or dual nationality.

== Previous squads ==
According to Portuguese Rugby Federation

The Cascais squad for the 2025–26 Campeonato Nacional de Rugby season
**Props**: (Portugal) **José Lavos**^{LUS}; (Argentina) Nicolas Griffiths^{LUS}; (Argentina) José Martinez; (Argentina) Ignácio Urueña; (Portugal) Duarte Conde^{LUS}; **Hookers**: (Portugal) **Santiago Lopes**^{LUS}; (Portugal) **Nuno Mascarenhas**^{LUS}; **Locks**: (Portugal) **Boaventura Almeida**^{LUS}; (Portugal) **Martim Belo**^{LUS}; (Portugal) Alexandre Fonseca Rodrigues^{LUS}; (Portugal) Manuel Barros^{LUS}; (Argentina) Israel Parnas; (Portugal) António Carvalho Martins; (Portugal) Luis Graça; (Portugal) Francisco Aranha Martins	**Backrow**: (Portugal) **Francisco Sousa**; (Portugal) **Duarte Costa Campos**; (Portugal) Lourenço Durão^{LUS}; (Portugal) Sebastião Petronilho; (Portugal) Francisco Martins; (Portugal) Dinis Pitta; (Portugal) Gonçalo Carvalho; (Portugal) António Andrade; (Portugal) Manuel Soares; **Scrum-halves**: (England) Noah Nash; (Argentina) Rafael Iriarte; (Portugal) Duarte Cardoso^{LUS}; (Portugal) Francisco Carmona Costa; (Portugal) Tomás Martins; **Fly-halves**: (Argentina) Santiago Jara; (Portugal) Francisco Pissarra	**Three-quarters**: (Portugal) **António Vidinha**^{LUS}; (Portugal) **Francisco Vassalo**; (Northern Ireland) Maximilien Coutts^{*}^{LUS}; (Portugal) Vasco Durão^{LUS}; (Portugal) Francisco C. Campos; (Portugal) José Villar Gomes; (Portugal) António Sousa; (Portugal) Luis Ferros; (Portugal) Duarte Tavares; **Fullbacks**: (Portugal) Vasco Correia^{LUS}; (Portugal) Alfredo Almeida^{LUS}; (Portugal) José Lopes; (Portugal) Henrique Matias
(c) denotes the team captain, **Bold** denotes internationally capped players. ^{LUS} denotes Lusitanos capped players.^{*} denotes players qualified to play for Portugal on residency or dual nationality.

The Cascais squad for the 2023–24 TOP 10 season
**Props**: (Portugal) **Nuno Mascarenhas**; (Brazil) **Pedro Bengaló**; (Argentina) Ignácio Urueña; (Argentina) Nicolas Griffiths; (Portugal) José Lavos; (Portugal) Duarte Conde; (Portugal) Pedro Lopes; **Hookers**: (Portugal) Santiago Lopes; (Argentina) José Martinez; (England) Joseph Duffy; (Portugal) Bernardo Gomes; (Portugal) Alexander Vieira; **Locks**: (Portugal) **Martim Belo**; (Portugal) Alexandre Fonseca Rodrigues; (Portugal) Manuel Barros; (Portugal) Gustavo Freire; (Portugal) António Carvalho Martins; (Portugal) Luis Graça; (Portugal) João Cabaço	**Backrow**: (Argentina) **Gonzalo Paulin**; (Portugal) **Salvador Vassalo**; (Portugal) **Duarte Costa Campos**; (Portugal) **Boaventura Almeida**; (Portugal) **Francisco Sousa**; (Portugal) Sebastião Petronilho; (Portugal) Gonçalo Carvalho; (Portugal) Diogo Pina; (Portugal) Lourenço Durão; **Scrum-halves**: (England) Noah Nash; (Portugal) Duarte Cardoso; (Portugal) Domingos Albuquerque; (Portugal) Francisco Carmona e Costa; **Fly-halves**: (Argentina) **Gabriel Ascárate**; (Argentina) Santiago Jara	**Centres**: (Romania) **Gabriel Pop**; (Portugal) **António Vidinha**; (Portugal) Francisco C. Campos; **Wingers**: (Portugal) Vasco Durão; (Portugal) José Villar Gomes; (Portugal) António Sousa; (Portugal) Francisco Pissarra; (Portugal) Duarte Tavares; **Fullbacks**: (Portugal) Vasco Correia; (Portugal) Alfredo Almeida
(c) denotes the team captain, **Bold** denotes internationally capped players.^{*} denotes players qualified to play for Portugal on residency or dual nationality.
