= Owen Jenkins (rugby union) =

Welsh rugby union footballer

- Born: Owen Jenkins; 20 July 1993 (age 33) Ynysybwl, Wales
- Height: 183 cm (6 ft 0 in)
- Weight: 92 kg (203 lb; 14 st 7 lb)
- Notable relative: Garin Jenkins (father)

Rugby union career
- Position: Wing/Centre
Senior career
Years	Team	Apps	(Points)
2013–2019	Cardiff Blues	5	(0)
2019–2022	Dragons	19	(15)
- Correct as of 23 January 2023
International career
Years	Team	Apps	(Points)
- Wales U20
–	Wales Sevens		

Owen Jenkins (born 20 July 1993) is a Welsh rugby union player who plays as a hooker for Wales Sevens. He was a Wales under-20 international and also played for Cardiff Blues and the Dragons. He is the son of former Wales hooker Garin Jenkins.

Jenkins made his professional debut in 2013 having previously played for the academy team and Pontypridd RFC. He competed for Wales at the 2022 Rugby World Cup Sevens in Cape Town.

Jenkins joined the Dragons in 2019. In 2020, Jenkins signed a long-term contract with the Dragons. He departed the club at the end of the 2021–22 United Rugby Championship season.

He has played for Belenenses Rugby in Portugal since 2022/23.
