= Portuguese Rugby Cup =

- Founded: 1959; 67 years ago
- Region: Portugal
- Teams: 38
- Current champions: Cascais (5th title)
- Most championships: Agronomia (11 titles)
- 2026–27 Portuguese Rugby Cup

The Taça de Portugal de Rugby (English: Portuguese Rugby Cup) is the major Portuguese national rugby union knock-out competition. It has occurred, almost on a yearly basis since 1959, and is organized by the Portuguese Rugby Federation.

Cascais are the current holders.

== Taça de Portugal finals ==
Season	Winner	Score	Runner-up
1958–59	Belenenses	8 – 3	Benfica
1959–60		Not Played	
1960–61	Benfica	11 – 8	CDUL
1961–62		Not Played	
1962–63		Not Played	
1963–64	Belenenses	15 – 0	Sporting
1964–65	Benfica	4 – 3	Agronomia
1965–66	Benfica	21 - 6	Agronomia
1966–67		Not Played	
1967–68	CDUL	33 – 3	Agronomia
1968–69	Técnico	6 – 5	CDUL
1969–70	Benfica	27 – 3	Direito
1970–71	Técnico	12 – 6	Belenenses
1971–72	Benfica	13 – 11	CDUL
1972–73	Técnico	15 – 12	Benfica
1973–74	Académica	15 – 12	Benfica
1974–75	Benfica	30 – 0	Estrela da Amadora
1975–76	Direito	16 – 8	Académica
1976–77	CDUL	9 – 7	Benfica
1977–78	Agronomia	12 – 11	Belenenses
1978–79	CDUL	13 – 11	Benfica
1979–80	Académica	23 – 6	CDUL
1980–81	Direito	7 – 0	CDUP
1981–82	Direito	16 – 13	Belenenses
1982–83	Benfica	15 – 9	Direito
1983–84	Benfica	10 – 9	CDUL
1984–85	Benfica	18 – 12	CDUL
1985–86	CDUL	19 – 12	Benfica
1986–87	Cascais	20 – 9	CDUL
1987–88	CDUL	22 – 9	Académica
1988–89	CDUL	13 – 12	Belenenses
1989–90	Académica	14 – 13	Cascais
1990–91	Cascais	18 – 3	Benfica
1991–92	Cascais	18 – 8	Benfica
1992–93	Cascais	37 – 13	CDUL
1993–94	Técnico	19 – 11	Académica
1994–95	Académica	5 – 3	Cascais
1995–96	Académica	13 – 10	Benfica
1996–97	Académica	19 – 15	Cascais
1997–98	Agronomia	33 – 15	Académica
1998–99	Agronomia	32 – 18	Benfica
1999–00	Agronomia	9 – 5	Cascais
2000–01	Belenenses	13 – 12	Direito
2001–02	Direito	28 – 7	Agronomia
2002–03	CDUP	3 – 3 (15 – 9 pen)	Direito
2003–04	Direito	32 – 15	Agronomia
2004–05	Direito	19 – 12	Belenenses
2005–06	Agronomia	23 – 19	CDUP
2006–07	CDUP	23 – 9	Técnico
2007–08	Direito	30 – 13	Agronomia
2008–09	Agronomia	38 – 0	Belenenses
2009–10	Agronomia	23 – 16	CDUL
2010–11	Agronomia	24 – 12	Direito
2011–12	Agronomia	35 – 21	Académica
2012–13	CDUL	35 – 23	Agronomia
2013–14	Direito	26 – 24	CDUL
2014–15	CDUL	20 – 17	Cascais
2015–16	Direito	30 – 12	Agronomia
2016–17	Agronomia	16 – 8	Cascais
2017-18	Académica	20-15	Agronomia
2018-19	Belenenses	28-15	Técnico
2019-20		Not Played (covid)	
2020-21	Belenenses	27-15	Técnico
2021-22	Belenenses	25-20	Agronomia
2022-23	CDUL	20-18	Belenenses
2023-24	Agronomia	15-9	Direito
2024-25	CDUL	23-19	Cascais
2025-26	Cascais	25-20	Belenenses

=== Performance by club ===
Club	Titles	Years won
Agronomia	11	1978, 1998, 1999, 2000, 2006, 2009, 2010, 2011, 2012, 2017, 2024
CDUL	10	1968, 1977, 1979, 1986, 1988, 1989, 2013, 2015, 2023, 2025
Benfica	9	1961, 1965, 1966, 1970, 1972, 1975, 1983, 1984, 1985
Direito	9	1976, 1981, 1982, 2002, 2004, 2005, 2008, 2014, 2016
Académica	7	1974, 1980, 1990, 1995, 1996, 1997, 2018
Belenenses	6	1959, 1964, 2001, 2019, 2021, 2022
Cascais	5	1987, 1991, 1992, 1993, 2026
Técnico	4	1969, 1971, 1973, 1994
CDUP	2	2003, 2007

== See also ==
- Rugby union in Portugal
