= Associação Académica de Coimbra (rugby union) =

- Union: FPR
- Nickname: Académica
- Founded: 1936; 90 years ago
- Location: Coimbra, Portugal
- Region: Coimbra
- Ground: Estádio Municipal Sérgio Conceição (Capacity: 2,500)
- Chairman: Joaquim Neto Murta
- Coach: Rui Rodrigues
- League: Campeonato Português de Rugby

Official website
- rugbyaac.com

Associação Académica de Coimbra, Rugby is one of the leading teams of rugby union in Portugal. It is currently one of Portugal's top 8 clubs and plays in the Super Bock above the 1st Division. The club is one of the most successful of the sports sections of the Associação Académica de Coimbra, and is based at the same Estadio Municipal as the fully independent football team.

The club was founded in 1936 and won the Campeonato Português de Rugby in 1977, 1979, 1997 and 2004, and the Portuguese Rugby Cup in 1974, 1980, 1990, 1995, 1996, 1997 and 2018.

== Honors ==
- Campeonato Nacional Honra/Super Bock:
  - Winner (4): 1976/77, 1978/79, 1996/97, 2003/04
- Taça de Portugal de Rugby:
  - Winner (7): 1973/74, 1979/80, 1989/90, 1994/95, 1995/96, 1996/97, 2017/18
- Supertaça de Portugal de Rugby:
  - Winner (2): 1988, 1996
- Taça Ibérica:
  - Winner (1): 1997/98

== Current squad ==
Information based on Portuguese Rugby Federation

The Académica squad for the 2026–27 Super XV season
**Props**: (Brazil) **Alexandre Alves**; (Brazil) **João Henrique Arnaud**; (Argentina) Haidar Eljatib; (Italy) Nahuel Harsch; (Portugal) João Cláudio Dos Santos; (Portugal) Francisco Gonçalves; (Portugal) Filipe Hipólito; **Hookers**: (Portugal) Edmundo Ferreira^{LUS}; (Portugal) João Aguiar; **Locks**: (Brazil) **Artur Lima**; (Czech Republic) **Matyáš Jandík**; (Portugal) Daniel Almeida; (Portugal) Francisco Teles; (Portugal) Diogo Sanches; (Portugal) Guilherme Coelho; (Portugal) Afonso Cabral	**Backrow**: (Argentina) Esteban Albornoz; (Portugal) Miguel André; (Portugal) Francisco Curica; (Portugal) Francisco Rovira; (Portugal) Vasco Tojo; **Scrum-halves**: (Brazil) **Rafael Gattino**; (Portugal) Silvio Costa; (Portugal) Ruben Ari; **Fly-halves**: (Uruguay) **Icaro Amarillo**	**Three-quarters**: (Netherlands) **Tobias Nota**; (Portugal) João Cunha^{LUS}; (Portugal) David Tender Gomes^{LUS}; (Portugal) António Pinto Costa^{LUS}; (Portugal) Francisco Migueis; (Portugal) Nuno Fernandes; (Portugal) Nuno Cardoso; **Fullbacks**: (Portugal) Tiago Pintão; (Portugal) Gaspar Neto; (Portugal) Francisco Carrito
(c) denotes the team captain, **Bold** denotes internationally capped players. ^{LUS} denotes Lusitanos capped players.^{*} denotes players qualified to play for Portugal on residency or dual nationality.

== Previous squads ==
According to Portuguese Rugby Federation

The Académica squad for the 2025–26 Campeonato Nacional de Rugby season
**Props**: (Brazil) **Alexandre Alves**; (Brazil) João Henrique Arnaud; (Portugal) Afonso Machado; (Portugal) João Cláudio Dos Santos; (Portugal) Francisco Gonçalves; (Portugal) Martim Pereira; **Hookers**: (Portugal) **João Mateus**^{LUS}; (Argentina) Ignacio Failla; (Portugal) João Aguiar; (Portugal) João Sousa; **Locks**: (Portugal) **Sérgio Duarte Franco**; (Brazil) **Matheus Wolf** (c); (Brazil) **Kauã Guimarães**; (Brazil) Artur Lima; (Portugal) Gonçalo Costa; (Portugal) Daniel Almeida; (Portugal) Francisco Teles; (Portugal) Diogo Sanches; (Portugal) Guilherme Coelho	**Backrow**: (Brazil) **Diogo Paixão Santos**; (Wales) Joe Greaves; (Portugal) Edmundo Ferreira^{LUS}; (Portugal) Miguel André; (Portugal) Francisco Silva; (Portugal) Francisco Curica; (Portugal) Francisco Rovira; (Portugal) Afonso Cabral; (Portugal) Vasco Tojo; (Portugal) Pedro Arinto; (Portugal) Miguel Prata; **Scrum-halves**: (Brazil) **Rafael Gattino**; (Portugal) José Fernandes; (Portugal) Silvio Costa; **Fly-halves**: (South Africa) Charles Williams; (South Africa) Ron McCrimmon; (Portugal) Gustavo Rocha; (Portugal) Joaquim Couto	**Three-quarters**: (Portugal) **João Diogo Silva**; (Brazil) **Victor Guilherme Souza**; (Portugal) João Cunha^{LUS}; (Portugal) David Tender Gomes^{LUS}; (Portugal) António Pinto Costa^{LUS}; (Portugal) Francisco Migueis; (Portugal) Edson Paulino; (Portugal) Nuno Fernandes; (Portugal) Afonso Monteiro; (Portugal) Nuno Cardoso; **Fullbacks**: (Ireland) Ross Doogan; (Portugal) Tiago Pintão; (Portugal) Gaspar Neto; (Portugal) Rodrigo Silva; (Portugal) Francisco Carrito
(c) denotes the team captain, **Bold** denotes internationally capped players. ^{LUS} denotes Lusitanos capped players.^{*} denotes players qualified to play for Portugal on residency or dual nationality.

The Académica squad for the 2023–24 TOP 10 season
**Props**: (Brazil) **Alexandre Alves**; (South Africa) Mzo Buthelezi; (Portugal) André Gonçalves; (Portugal) Afonso Machado; (Portugal) João Cláudio Dos Santos; **Hookers**: (Portugal) **João Mateus**; (Argentina) Santiago Bonavento; (Portugal) João Aguiar; (Portugal) Guilherme Coelho; **Locks**: (Brazil) **Matheus Wolf**; (Brazil) **Diogo Paixão Santos**; (Portugal) **Sérgio Duarte Franco**; (Brazil) Artur Lima; (Portugal) Gonçalo Costa; (Portugal) Daniel Almeida; (Portugal) Rafael Espirito Santo	**Backrow**: (South Africa) Ntokozo Vidima; (Argentina) Genaro Fissore; (Portugal) João Tavares; (Portugal) Edmundo Ferreira; (Portugal) Francisco Curica; (Portugal) Antonio Salgueiro; (Portugal) Gonçalo Breda; (Portugal) Miguel André; **Scrum-halves**: (Argentina) Tomás Cornejo; (Portugal) Silvio Costa; **Fly-halves**: (Argentina) Geronimo Boccazzi; (Australia) Blake Rixon	**Centres**: (Brazil) **Moisés Duque**; (Australia) Marcus Arrindell; (Portugal) Francisco Migueis; (Portugal) Gonçalo Ramos; **Wingers**: (Portugal) **João Diogo Silva**; (Portugal) João Dinis; (Portugal) Rodrigo Barradas; (Portugal) Afonso Monteiro; (Portugal) João Cunha; (Portugal) António Costa; **Fullbacks**: (Portugal) Nuno Cardoso; (Portugal) Joaquim Couto; (Portugal) Tiago Pintão
(c) denotes the team captain, **Bold** denotes internationally capped players.^{*} denotes players qualified to play for Portugal on residency or dual nationality.
