= Grupo Desportivo Direito =

Direito
- Full name: Grupo Desportivo Direito
- Founded: 14 October 1952 (74 years ago)
- Ground: Monsanto (Capacity: 1500)
- Chairman: Antonio Aguilar
- Coach: Enrique Pichot
- League: Campeonato Nacional Honra/Super Bock
- 2024/25: 3rd Place
Team kit

Grupo Desportivo Direito, nicknamed Os Advogados (The Lawyers), is an amateur Portuguese rugby union team based in Lisbon. Since its foundation in 1952, Direito has been one of the most successful teams in Portugal, having won the Campeonato Nacional Honra/Super Bock 12 times, the Taça de Portugal de Rugby 9 times and the Taça Ibérica 4 times.

== Honours ==
- Campeonato Nacional Honra/Super Bock:
  - Winner (12): 1998/99, 1999/00, 2001/02, 2004/05, 2005/06, 2008/09, 2009/10, 2010/11, 2012/13, 2014/15, 2015/16 and 2022/23
- Taça de Portugal de Rugby:
  - Winner (9): 1975/76, 1980/81, 1981/82, 2001/02, 2003/04, 2004/05, 2007/08, 2013/14 and 2015/16
- Taça Ibérica:
  - Winner (4): 2000, 2003, 2013, 2015
- Supertaça de Portugal de Rugby:
  - Winner (12): 1999, 2000, 2002, 2004, 2006, 2008, 2009, 2010, 2013, 2014, 2015, 2023

== Current squad ==
Information based on Portuguese Rugby Federation

The Direito squad for the 2026–27 Super XV season
**Props**: (Portugal) **David Costa**^{LUS}; (Portugal) **António Prim**^{LUS}; (Portugal) **José Lupi**; (Portugal) **Luis Lopes**; (Portugal) **Afonso Tapadinhas**; (Portugal) André Bardziy^{LUS}; (Portugal) Lourenço Moita; (Portugal) João Pissarra; **Hookers**: (Portugal) **Duarte Diniz**^{LUS}; (Argentina) Fabian Contreras; **Locks**: (Portugal) **Duarte Torgal**^{LUS}; (Portugal) **Pedro Ferreira**^{LUS}; (Portugal) **Duarte Pedro Nunes**^{LUS}; (Portugal) António Peixoto^{LUS}; (Portugal) Henrique Cortes; (Portugal) Nuno Pina	**Backrow**: (Portugal) **Manuel Picão**^{LUS}; (Portugal) **João Granate** (c)^{LUS}; (Portugal) **Pedro Afra Rosa**; (Portugal) Nuno Peixoto^{LUS}; (Portugal) João Vital; (Portugal) Mateus Ferreira; (Portugal) Miguel Romero Rodrigues; (Portugal) António Mello; (Portugal) Diogo Matos; (Portugal) Frederico Castello Branco; (Portugal) Guilherme Spratley; (Portugal) António Carvalho; **Scrum-halves**: (Portugal) **João Dias**^{LUS}; (Japan) Kenta Kutsuna; (Portugal) Afonso Castiñeira; (Portugal) Salvador Seabra; **Fly-halves**: (Portugal) Martim Dias^{LUS}; (Portugal) Bernardo Nogueira	**Three-quarters**: (Portugal) João Afra Rosa^{LUS}; (Portugal) Manuel Reis^{LUS}; (Portugal) Tomás Batista^{LUS}; (Argentina) Joaquin Bustos; (France) Yanis Cornet; (Portugal) João Burnay; (Portugal) Duarte Portela; (Portugal) Ricardo Mieiro; (Portugal) Francisco Teixeira; (Portugal) Francisco Pinto; (Portugal) Manuel Romero Rodrigues; (Portugal) Hugo Miguel Cristóvão; **Fullbacks**: (Portugal) **Caetano Castelo Branco**; (Portugal) João Vaz Antunes; (Portugal) Martim Dias; (Portugal) Frederico Roquette; (Portugal) Vasco Trindade
(c) denotes the team captain, **Bold** denotes internationally capped players. ^{LUS} denotes Lusitanos capped players.^{*} denotes players qualified to play for Portugal on residency or dual nationality.

== Previous squads ==
According to Portuguese Rugby Federation

The Direito squad for the 2025–26 Campeonato Nacional de Rugby season
**Props**: (Portugal) **David Costa**^{LUS}; (Portugal) **António Prim**^{LUS}; (Portugal) **José Lupi**; (Portugal) **Luis Lopes**; (Portugal) **Afonso Tapadinhas**; (Argentina) Javier Corvalan; (Argentina) Giovanni Ramallo; (Portugal) André Bardziy^{LUS}; (Portugal) Lourenço Moita; (Portugal) João Pissarra; (Portugal) Leandro Nunes; **Hookers**: (Portugal) **Duarte Diniz**^{LUS}; (Argentina) Fabian Contreras; **Locks**: (Portugal) **Duarte Torgal**^{LUS}; (Portugal) **Pedro Ferreira**^{LUS}; (Portugal) **Duarte Pedro Nunes**^{LUS}; (Portugal) António Peixoto^{LUS}; (Portugal) Henrique Cortes; (Portugal) Nuno Pina	**Backrow**: (Portugal) **Manuel Picão**^{LUS}; (Portugal) **João Granate** (c)^{LUS}; (Portugal) **Pedro Afra Rosa**; (Argentina) Tomas Suárez; (Portugal) João Vital; (Portugal) Mateus Ferreira; (Portugal) Miguel Romero Rodrigues; (Portugal) António Mello; (Portugal) Diogo Matos; (Portugal) Luis Pina; (Portugal) Frederico Castello Branco; (Portugal) Guilherme Spratley; **Scrum-halves**: (Portugal) **João Dias**^{LUS}; (Portugal) Afonso Castiñeira; (Portugal) Salvador Seabra; **Fly-halves**: (Argentina) Joaquin Mihura; (Portugal) Martim Dias; (Portugal) Bernardo Nogueira	**Three-quarters**: (Portugal) João Afra Rosa^{LUS}; (Portugal) Francisco Afra Rosa^{LUS}; (Portugal) Manuel Reis^{LUS}; (Argentina) Joaquin Bustos; (Portugal) Francisco Nobre; (Portugal) José Ferreira; (Portugal) João Burnay; (Portugal) Francisco Teixeira; (Portugal) Tomás Cary; (Portugal) Francisco Pinto; (Portugal) Manuel Romero Rodrigues; (Portugal) Hugo Miguel Cristóvão; **Fullbacks**: (Portugal) **Caetano Castelo Branco**; (Portugal) João Vaz Antunes; (Portugal) Martim Dias; (Portugal) Duarte Matos; (Portugal) Frederico Roquette; (Portugal) Francisco Perloiro
(c) denotes the team captain, **Bold** denotes internationally capped players. ^{LUS} denotes Lusitanos capped players.^{*} denotes players qualified to play for Portugal on residency or dual nationality.

The Direito squad for the 2023–24 TOP 10 season
**Props**: (Portugal) **David Costa**; (Portugal) **António Prim**; (Portugal) **Francisco Bruno**; (Portugal) **José Lupi**; (Argentina) Guillermo Durán; (Portugal) Luis Lopes; (Portugal) Afonso Tapadinhas; (Portugal) Lourenço Moita; **Hookers**: (Portugal) **Duarte Diniz**; (Portugal) Afonso Bento; **Locks**: (Portugal) **Duarte Torgal**; (Portugal) **Rui D'Orey**; (Portugal) João Vital; (Portugal) António Peixoto; (Portugal) Guilherme Valente; (Portugal) Pedro Ferreira; (Portugal) Luis Semedo; (Portugal) Henrique Cortes; (Portugal) Duarte Pedro Nunes	**Backrow**: (Portugal) **Manuel Picão**; (Portugal) **João Granate**; (Portugal) **Vasco Fragoso Mendes**; (Portugal) **Pedro Afra Rosa**; (Portugal) Nuno Peixoto; (New Zealand) Tama Faitotonu; (Portugal) Mateus Ferreira; (Portugal) Sebastião Silva; (Portugal) Diogo Matos; (Portugal) Miguel Romero Rodrigues; (Portugal) Luis Pina; **Scrum-halves**: (Portugal) **João Dias**; (Portugal) **Manuel Queirós**; (Portugal) António Amaral; (Portugal) Duarte Cortes; (Portugal) Afonso Castiñeira; **Fly-halves**: (Portugal) **Jerónimo Portela**; (Portugal) **Frederico Filipe**; (Portugal) Manuel Vareiro	**Centres**: (Portugal) **José Maria Vareta**; (Portugal) Francisco Nobre; (Portugal) João Afra Rosa; (Portugal) Tomás Cary; **Wingers**: (Portugal) João Vaz Antunes; (Portugal) Duarte Portela; (Portugal) Duarte Matos; (Portugal) Diogo Custódio; (Portugal) João Burnay; (Portugal) Francisco Pinto; **Fullbacks**: (Portugal) **Manuel Vilela Pereira**; (Portugal) João Maria Silva; (Portugal) Francisco Perloiro; (Portugal) Frederico Roquette
(c) denotes the team captain, **Bold** denotes internationally capped players.^{*} denotes players qualified to play for Portugal on residency or dual nationality.

== History ==
Season	Manager	Championship	Cup	Super Cup	Iberian Cup
1996/97	(Portugal) Tomaz Morais	Second tier CH	QF		
1997/98	(Portugal) Tomaz Morais	RU	SF		
1998/99	(Portugal) Tomaz Morais	CH	QF		
1999/00	(Portugal) Tomaz Morais	CH	SF	CH	CH
2000/01	(Portugal) Tomaz Morais	RU	RU	CH	RU
2001/02	(Portugal) Dídio de Aguiar	CH	CH		
2002/03	(Portugal) José Mendes da Silva	RU	RU	CH	CH
2003/04	(Portugal) José Mendes da Silva	3rd	CH		
2004/05	(Argentina) Daniel Hourcade	CH	CH	CH	
2005/06	(Argentina) Daniel Hourcade	CH	SF	RU	RU
2006/07	(Argentina) Daniel Hourcade	RU	QF	RU	RU
2007/08	(Argentina) Daniel Hourcade	5th	CH		RU
2008/09	(Portugal) Frederico Sousa	CH	QF	CH	
2009/10	(Portugal) Frederico Sousa	CH	SF	CH	
2010/11	(New Zealand) Aaron Jones	CH	RU	CH	
2011/12	(New Zealand) Aaron Jones	3rd	SF	RU	
2012/13	(Portugal) Martim Aguiar	CH	R16		
2013/14	(Portugal) Martim Aguiar	RU	CH	CH	CH
2014/15	(Portugal) Martim Aguiar	CH	R16	CH	
2015/16	(Portugal) Martim Aguiar	CH	CH	CH	CH
2016/17	(Portugal) Francisco Aguiar	3rd	QF	RU	RU
2017/18	(Portugal) Miguel Leal	4th	QF		
2018/19	(Portugal) Miguel Leal	5th	QF		
2019/20	(Portugal) Miguel Leal	cancelled	cancelled		
2020/21	(Portugal) Miguel Leal	RU	SF		
2021/22	(Portugal) António Aguilar	RU	QF		
2022/23	(Argentina) Enrique Pichot	CH	R16		
2023/24	(Argentina) Enrique Pichot	4th	RU	CH	RU
2024/25	(Portugal) Bernardo Mota	3rd	SF		
2025/26	(Portugal) Gonçalo Malheiro	3rd	SF		
