= C. R. Técnico =

Técnico
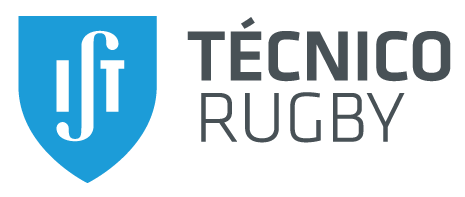
- Full name: Associação de Estudantes do Instituto Superior Técnico
- Founded: 1963; 63 years ago
- Ground: Campo das Olaias
- Coach: António Manzoni de Sequeira (2024/2025)
- League: Campeonato Nacional Honra/Super Bock
- 2020–21: 1st
Team kit

Clube de Rugby do Técnico or C.R. Técnico is a Portuguese rugby union club.

Técnico has won 3 Championships and 4 Portuguese Cup's. It was founded in 1963, by four rugby union players and students of Técnico, Alfredo Santos, José Luis Steiger, José Metelo and Pedro Sousa Ribeiro.

In the late eighties, it set out to build his own field in Olaias, leaving Estádio Universitário de Lisboa where it used to play.

C.R Técnico has all age groups teams, from Under 8 to Veterans, including 2 senior teams, women's side and also Touch Rugby.

== Honours ==
- Campeonato Nacional Honra/Super Bock:
  - Winner (3): 1981, 1998, 2021
- Taça de Portugal de Rugby:
  - Winner (4): 1969, 1971, 1973, 1994

== Current squad ==
Information based on Portuguese Rugby Federation

The CR Técnico squad for the 2026–27 Super XV season
**Props**: (Portugal) **André Arrojado**^{LUS}; (Samoa) Tevita Langi; (New Zealand) Meli Sifa; (Portugal) Salvador Patrício; (Portugal) Diogo Teixeira; **Hookers**: (Brazil) **Endy William**; (Portugal) João Nobre; **Locks**: (Portugal) Afonso Cirilo; (Portugal) Gonçalo Costa; (Portugal) Miguel Pereira; (Portugal) Alexandre Rosário Silva; (Portugal) Simão Medeiro	**Backrow**: (New Zealand) Reegan Wheeler; (New Zealand) Milan Kriletich; (Portugal) Tomás Mano; (Portugal) Manuel Maia; (Portugal) Pedro Nunes; (Portugal) Salvador Bento; (Portugal) Filipe Caeiro; **Scrum-halves**: (Portugal) **Pedro Lucas**^{LUS}; (Portugal) André Aquino; (Portugal) Manuel Salinas; **Fly-halves**: (Portugal) Hugo Trigueiro; (Portugal) Francisco Correia	**Three-quarters**: (Portugal) Francisco Salgado^{LUS}; (Italy) Marco Broggin; (France) Lenny Valleyé; (New Zealand) Kanavale Helu; (Portugal) Rodrigo Henriques; (Portugal) Francisco Vallêra; (Portugal) Diogo Salgado; (Portugal) Guilherme Sampaio; (Portugal) Mateus Fontes; (Portugal) António Cardoso; **Fullbacks**: (New Zealand) Rewita Biddle; (Portugal) Miguel Rosa; (Portugal) Manuel Salgado
(c) denotes the team captain, **Bold** denotes internationally capped players. ^{LUS} denotes Lusitanos capped players.^{*} denotes players qualified to play for Portugal on residency or dual nationality.

== Previous squads ==
According to Portuguese Rugby Federation

The CR Técnico squad for the 2025–26 Campeonato Nacional de Rugby season
**Props**: (Portugal) **André Arrojado**^{LUS}; (New Zealand) Tevita Langi; (Portugal) João Nobre; (Portugal) Diogo Teixeira; (Portugal) Vasco Tavares; (Portugal) João Lobo; **Hookers**: (Portugal) **Rodrigo Bento**^{LUS}; (Portugal) Miguel Seoane; (Portugal) Manuel Barral; **Locks**: (Samoa) **Jonathan Toelupe**; (Portugal) **Guilherme Costa**^{LUS}; (Portugal) Afonso Cirilo; (Portugal) Gonçalo Costa; (Portugal) Estevão Baltazar; (Portugal) Miguel Pereira; (Portugal) Alexandre Rosário Silva; (Portugal) Sérgio Medeiro; (Portugal) Simão Medeiro	**Backrow**: (New Zealand) Reegan Wheeler; (New Zealand) Irirangi Taniere; (Portugal) Francisco Silva; (Portugal) Manuel Serrano; (Portugal) João D'Orey; (Portugal) Diogo Teixeira; (Portugal) Tomás Mano; (Portugal) Manuel Maia; (Portugal) Pedro Nunes; **Scrum-halves**: (Portugal) **Pedro Lucas**^{LUS}; (Portugal) Francisco Pedro; **Fly-halves**: (Portugal) Hugo Trigueiro	**Three-quarters**: (Samoa) **Pisi Leilua**; (New Zealand) Kanavale Helu; (New Zealand) Blake Makiri; (South Africa) Jaryd de Jager; (France) Noah Ménard; (Portugal) Francisco Salgado^{LUS}; (Portugal) Rodrigo Henriques; (Portugal) António Cardoso; (Portugal) Francisco Vallêra; (Portugal) Lourenço Chambel; (Portugal) Diogo Salgado; (Portugal) Guilherme Sampaio; (Portugal) Henrique Lacerda; **Fullbacks**: (Italy) Levi Conti; (Portugal) Miguel Rosa; (Portugal) Nuno Fradinho
(c) denotes the team captain, **Bold** denotes internationally capped players. ^{LUS} denotes Lusitanos capped players.^{*} denotes players qualified to play for Portugal on residency or dual nationality.

The CR Técnico squad for the 2024–25 Campeonato Nacional de Rugby season
**Props**: (Portugal) **André Arrojado**; (Portugal) Diogo Teixeira; (Portugal) Vasco Tavares; (Portugal) João Lobo; **Hookers**: (Portugal) **Rodrigo Bento**; (Portugal) Manuel Barral; **Locks**: (Portugal) Guilherme Costa; (Portugal) Gonçalo Costa; (Portugal) Afonso Cirilo; (Portugal) Estevão Baltazar; (Portugal) Alexandre Rosário Silva	**Backrow**: (Argentina) José Guillen; (Argentina) Tomas Suárez; (Argentina) Agustin Arburua; (Brazil) Caio Almeida; (France) Léon L'Huillier; (Portugal) Francisco Silva; (Portugal) João D'Orey; (Portugal) Pedro Nunes; **Scrum-halves**: (Portugal) **Pedro Lucas**; (Portugal) Francisco Pedro; (Portugal) Rodrigo Henriques; **Fly-halves**: (South Africa) Conor Van Eden; (Portugal) Hugo Trigueiro	**Centres**: (France) Alexis Delprat; (Portugal) Miguel Rosa; (Portugal) António Cardoso; **Wingers**: (Portugal) Francisco Lacerda; (Portugal) Henrique Lacerda; **Fullbacks**: (Portugal) Manuel Vallêra; (Portugal) Francisco Vallêra; (Portugal) Nuno Fradinho
(c) denotes the team captain, **Bold** denotes internationally capped players.^{*} denotes players qualified to play for Portugal on residency or dual nationality.
