= Centro Desportivo Universitário do Porto =

CDUP
- Full name: Centro Desportivo Universitario do Porto
- Founded: 1963; 63 years ago
- Ground: Estádio Universitário do Porto
- Coach: (Portugal) Marcello d'Orey
- League: Campeonato Nacional Honra/Super Bock
- 2011-12: 6th
Team kit

Centro Desportivo Universitário do Porto or CDUP (Sports Center of University of Porto) is a Portuguese amateur sports club for students at the University of Porto, in Porto, Portugal.

== History ==
=== The dispute resolution with the University of Porto (2012–present) ===
In November 2012, CDUP and the University of Porto reached an agreement to settle the dispute they have been having since 2003, due to the refuse of the University to support and fund the federated sports side of the club.

Resulting from this agreement, the University of Porto published, in January 2013, the articles of association of a new autonomous service of the University called "CDUP-UP - Centro de Desporto da Universidade do Porto" with the responsibility of promoting and organizing university sports.

CDUP remained juridical autonomous from the University of Porto, although without the responsibility of university sports. Because of that, it was proposed to change its name to "CDUP-AD - Centro Desportivo Universitário do Porto, associação desportiva autónoma" and it became responsible only for federated non university sports, with the condition that, at least 50% of the total registered athletes, must be part of the academic community.

Until today, the club name hasn't changed and it is still called "CDUP - Centro Desportivo Universitário do Porto".

== Sports ==
CDUP enables students to practise a large number of sports and has sections dedicated to several sports at the competitive level, including athletics, handball, badminton, basketball, bridge, canoeing, swimming, water polo, rowing, table tennis, tennis, volleyball, chess, and the sport for which they are best known in Portugal — rugby.

The CDUP team is one of the best Portuguese rugby union teams and three of its players were included in the Portuguese squad for the 2007 Rugby World Cup. In Portugal, rugby is considered a traditional university sport.

== Facilities ==
CDUP facilities are located in two places in the city — the University Stadium and the Rua da Boa Hora. The CDUP headquarters are located in the Rua da Boa Hora n.º 20 (20, Boa Hora street) where there is also a swimming pool, rooms for martial arts, gymnastics, chess and table tennis. At the University Stadium, by the Arrábida Bridge, there are a multisports arena with two indoor sports fields, two tennis courts, an outdoor futsal field, and in stadium one athletics tartan track and one football/rugby grass pitch.

== Honors ==
- Taça de Portugal de Rugby:
  - Winner (3): 2002–03, 2006–07
- Athletics Portuguese Championship 1994: 3rd Place
- Chess Portuguese Team Championship 1985: Winner

== Rugby Squad 2023/24 ==
The CDUP squad for the 2023–24 TOP 10 season
| **Props**: (Portugal) **Filipe Granja**; (Argentina) Gonzalo Vidal; (Portugal) Bernardo Coelho; (Portugal) Diogo Amaro; **Hookers**: (Portugal) Nuno Figueiredo; (Portugal) António Terroso; **Locks**: (Portugal) Gonçalo Seruca; (Portugal) Tiago Albuquerque; (Portugal) Francisco Bastos; (Portugal) Luis Moreira; (Portugal) Henrique Vieira; (Portugal) Gonçalo Santos; (Portugal) Tiago Anjos; (Portugal) Afonso Santos | **Backrow**: (Argentina) Facundo Ojeda; (Portugal) Pedro Cálem; (Portugal) João Duarte; (Portugal) Luis Leão; (Portugal) Henrique Santos; (Portugal) Vasco Sarmento; (Portugal) Tomás Pereira; **Scrum-halves**: (Portugal) **João Belo**; (Portugal) Manuel Mendonça; **Fly-halves**: (Portugal) Tiago Rocha; (Portugal) Luis Agrelos; (Portugal) Bernardo Nogueira | **Centres**: (Portugal) Tomás Marrana; (Portugal) Miguel Trepa; (Portugal) Guilherme Brandão; (Portugal) Eduardo Moreira; **Wingers**: (Argentina) Rodrigo Gauna; (Portugal) Salvador Cardoso; (Portugal) Lucas Velo; (Portugal) Afonso Aguiar; (Portugal) José Diogo; **Fullbacks**: (Portugal) **Nuno Sousa Guedes**; (Portugal) Sebastião Leite; (Portugal) Nuno Maia |
(c) denotes the team captain, **Bold** denotes internationally capped players.^{*} denotes players qualified to play for Portugal on residency or dual nationality.
