= 2025–26 Campeonato Nacional de Rugby Divisão de Honra =

Portugal rugby union season

2025–26 TOP 12
- Countries: Portugal
- Number of teams: 12
- Champions: SL Benfica
- Runners-up: GDS Cascais
- Relegated: RC Montemor
- Top point scorer: Santiago Jara
- Top try scorer: Rodrigo Bento

Official website
- www.fpr.pt

The Campeonato Nacional de Rugby Divisão de Honra (more commonly known as the Divisão de Honra) is Portugal's top-level professional men's rugby union competition. The Divisão de Honra Championships are organized by the Federação Portuguesa de Rugby (Portuguese Rugby Federation) and currently consists of 12 teams. The last placed team in the competition is relegated at the end of the season to the Campeonato Nacional de Rugby I Divisão (Portugal's second level of men's rugby union) with one team from the second-tier competition promoted to the Divisão de Honra.

Location of teams in 2025–26 TOP 12

== Format ==
The championship is divided into two phases:

- Regular season
- Final season

Regular season The Divisão de Honra will be disputed by 12 (twelve) teams:

- 11 teams from the Divisão de Honra of the time 2024/2025;
- 1 team promoted from the national championship of the 1st division.

The Regular season of Divisão de Honra will be played by three groups of four (4) teams (Group A, Group B and Group C), which play in the system of all against all. At the end of the regular season, the top 2 teams of each group will take part in the championship group that will determine the champion, while the bottom 2 teams will play in "Plate Cup" group.

Group A	Group B	Group C
Belenenses	Cascais	Direito
Benfica	CDUL	São Miguel
Agronomia	CDUP	Técnico
RC Santarém	RC Montemor	Académica

Final season The final season will be disputed by two groups:

- Title Group - integrated by the first two classified teams of each group of the regular season.
- Relegation Group - integrated by teams classified in 3rd and 4th places of each group of the regular season.

The final classification of each group will define the champions and the final positions at the time 2025/26. The national champion of the 2025/2026 Divisão de Honra will be the first classified of the title group. The bottom team of "Relegation" group will be relegated to the lower division.

== Teams ==
Team	Manager	Captain	Stadium	Capacity
Académica	(South Africa) Lodie Van Staden	(Brazil) Matheus Wolf	Estádio Municipal Sérgio Conceição	2500
Agronomia	(Portugal) Luís Pissarra	(Portugal) Francisco Cabral	Tapada da Ajuda	500
Belenenses	(Portugal) João Mirra	(Portugal) Tomás Sequeira	Belém Rugby Park	500
Benfica	(Portugal) António Aguilar	(New Zealand) Hayden Hann	Campo nº2 - Lisbon University	1500
Cascais	(Argentina) Gabriel Ascárate	(Portugal) António Vidinha	Campo da Guia	1000
CDUL	(New Zealand) Kane Hancy	(Portugal) Tomás Appleton	Estádio Universitário de Lisboa	8000
CDUP	(Portugal) Francisco Vareta	(Portugal) Tomás Marrana	Estádio Universitário do Porto	1500
Direito	(Portugal) Gonçalo Malheiro	(Portugal) João Granate	Complexo Desportivo Miguel Nobre Ferreira	2500
RC Montemor	(Portugal) Rodrigo Costa Pereira	(Portugal) José Pinto Gouveia	Parque Desportivo Municipal	500
RC Santarém			Escola Prática de Cavalaria	500
São Miguel	(Portugal) João Uva	(Germany) Bader Pretorius	Bulldog Rugby Park	800
C. R. Técnico	(Australia) Marco Caputo	(Portugal) Rodrigo Bento	Campo das Olaias	800

== Regular season ==
=== Group Stage ===
==== Group A ====
Group A Table
	Club	Played	Won	Drawn	Lost	Points For	Points Against	Points Diff.	Try Bonus	Losing Bonus	Points
1	Benfica	6	5	0	1	243	100	143	3	0	23
2	Belenenses	6	5	0	1	220	109	111	2	0	22
3	Agronomia	6	2	0	4	162	125	37	2	3	13
4	RC Santarém	6	0	0	6	74	365	-291	0	0	0
Green background (rows 1 and 2) advance to "Champion" group.Red background (rows 3 and 4) advance to "Relegation" group. Updated: 29 January 2025

===== Round 1 =====
29 November 2026
15:00

Belenenses	31-29	Agronomia
Try: 5x Con: x Pen: x Drop: x		Try: 4x Con: x Pen: x Drop: x

Belém Rugby Park

30 November 2026
16:00

Benfica	62-21	RC Santarém
Try: 10x Con: x Pen: x Drop: x		Try: 3x Con: x Pen: x Drop: x

Campo nº2 Lisbon University

===== Round 2 =====
07 December 2026
14:00

Agronomia	16-20	Benfica
Try: 1x Con: x Pen: x Drop: x		Try: 2x Con: x Pen: x Drop: x

Tapada da Ajuda

07 December 2026
15:00

RC Santarém	12-64	Belenenses
Try: 2x Con: x Pen: x Drop: x		Try: 10x Con: x Pen: x Drop: x

CNEMA

===== Round 3 =====
13 December 2026
15:00

RC Santarém	17-40	Agronomia
Try: 2x Con: x Pen: x Drop: x		Try: 6x Con: x Pen: x Drop: x

CNEMA

13 December 2026
14:00

Belenenses	17-41	Benfica
Try: 2x Con: x Pen: x Drop: x		Try: 6x Con: x Pen: x Drop: x

Belém Rugby Park

===== Round 4 =====
21 December 2026
15:00

Agronomia	3-22	Belenenses
Try: 0x Con: x Pen: x Drop: x		Try: 3x Con: x Pen: x Drop: x

Tapada da Ajuda

20 December 2026
15:00

RC Santarém	0-85	Benfica
Try: 0x Con: x Pen: x Drop: x		Try: 13x Con: x Pen: x Drop: x

CNEMA

===== Round 5 =====
04 January 2026
16:00

Benfica	23-22	Agronomia
Try: 2x Con: x Pen: x Drop: x		Try: 3x Con: x Pen: x Drop: x

Campo nº2 Lisbon University

03 January 2026
15:00

Belenenses	62-12	RC Santarém
Try: 10x Con: x Pen: x Drop: x		Try: 2x Con: x Pen: x Drop: x

Belém Rugby Park

===== Round 6 =====
17 January 2026
12:00

Agronomia	52-12	RC Santarém
Try: 8x Con: x Pen: x Drop: x		Try: 2x Con: x Pen: x Drop: x

Tapada da Ajuda

17 January 2026
12:00

Benfica	12-24	Belenenses
Try: 2x Con: x Pen: x Drop: x		Try: 2x Con: x Pen: x Drop: x

Campo nº2 Lisbon University

==== Group B ====
Group B Table
	Club	Played	Won	Drawn	Lost	Points For	Points Against	Points Diff.	Try Bonus	Losing Bonus	Points
1	Cascais	6	6	0	0	401	52	349	5	0	29
2	CDUL	6	4	0	2	241	82	159	3	0	19
3	CDUP	6	2	0	4	132	247	-115	1	0	9
4	RC Montemor	6	0	0	6	36	429	-393	0	0	0
Green background (rows 1 and 2) advance to "Champion" group.Red background (rows 3 and 4) advance to "Relegation" group. Updated: 29 January 2025

===== Round 1 =====
29 November 2026
15:00

RC Montemor	0-110	Cascais
Try: 0x Con: x Pen: x Drop: x		Try: 16x Con: x Pen: x Drop: x

Parque Desportivo Municipal

29 November 2026
16:30

CDUP	22-44	CDUL
Try: 3x Con: x Pen: x Drop: x		Try: 5x Con: x Pen: x Drop: x

Estádio Universitário do Porto

===== Round 2 =====
06 December 2026
15:00

Cascais	66-9	CDUP
Try: 10x Con: x Pen: x Drop: x		Try: 0x Con: x Pen: x Drop: x

Estádio Municipal Dramático Cascais

06 December 2026
15:00

CDUL	86-0	RC Montemor
Try: 14x Con: x Pen: x Drop: x		Try: 0x Con: x Pen: x Drop: x

Estádio Universitário de Lisboa

===== Round 3 =====
13 December 2026
18:00

CDUL	17-34	Cascais
Try: 2x Con: x Pen: x Drop: x		Try: 3x Con: x Pen: x Drop: x

Estádio Universitário de Lisboa

13 December 2026
15:00

CDUP	49-12	RC Montemor
Try: 7x Con: x Pen: x Drop: x		Try: 2x Con: x Pen: x Drop: x

Estádio Universitário do Porto

===== Round 4 =====
20 December 2026
15:00

Cascais	104-0	RC Montemor
Try: 16x Con: x Pen: x Drop: x		Try: 0x Con: x Pen: x Drop: x

Estádio Municipal Dramático Cascais

20 December 2026
15:00

CDUL	40-0	CDUP
Try: 6x Con: x Pen: x Drop: x		Try: 0x Con: x Pen: x Drop: x

Estádio Universitário de Lisboa

===== Round 5 =====
10 January 2026
14:30

CDUP	17-61	Cascais
Try: 2x Con: x Pen: x Drop: x		Try: 9x Con: x Pen: x Drop: x

Estádio Universitário do Porto

04 January 2026
14:00

RC Montemor	0-45	CDUL
Try: 0x Con: x Pen: x Drop: x		Try: 7x Con: x Pen: x Drop: x

Parque Desportivo Municipal

===== Round 6 =====
17 January 2026
15:00

Cascais	26-9	CDUL
Try: 4x Con: x Pen: x Drop: x		Try: 0x Con: x Pen: x Drop: x

Estádio Municipal Dramático Cascais

17 January 2026
15:00

RC Montemor	24-35	CDUP
Try: 4x Con: x Pen: x Drop: x		Try: 5x Con: x Pen: x Drop: x

Parque Desportivo Municipal

==== Group C ====
Group C Table
	Club	Played	Won	Drawn	Lost	Points For	Points Against	Points Diff.	Try Bonus	Losing Bonus	Points
1	Direito	6	6	0	0	275	86	189	5	0	29
2	São Miguel	6	4	0	2	176	166	10	1	0	17
3	Técnico	6	2	0	4	137	197	-60	1	1	10
4	Académica	6	0	0	6	99	238	-139	0	1	1
Green background (rows 1 and 2) advance to "Champion" group.Red background (rows 3 and 4) advance to "Relegation" group. Updated: 29 January 2025

===== Round 1 =====
30 November 2026
14:00

Técnico	25-28	São Miguel
Try: 3x Con: x Pen: x Drop: x		Try: 3x Con: x Pen: x Drop: x

Campo das Olaias

29 November 2026
15:00

Académica	13-45	Direito
Try: 1x Con: x Pen: x Drop: x		Try: 7x Con: x Pen: x Drop: x

Estádio Municipal Sérgio Conceição

===== Round 2 =====
06 December 2026
15:00

São Miguel	56-10	Académica
Try: 8x Con: x Pen: x Drop: x		Try: 1x Con: x Pen: x Drop: x

Bulldog Rugby Park

06 December 2026
12:00

Direito	43-15	Técnico
Try: 6x Con: x Pen: x Drop: x		Try: 2x Con: x Pen: x Drop: x

Complexo Desportivo Miguel Nobre Ferreira

===== Round 3 =====
14 December 2026
12:00

Direito	48-0	São Miguel
Try: 8x Con: x Pen: x Drop: x		Try: 0x Con: x Pen: x Drop: x

Complexo Desportivo Miguel Nobre Ferreira

13 December 2026
15:00

Académica	13-26	Técnico
Try: 1x Con: x Pen: x Drop: x		Try: 4x Con: x Pen: x Drop: x

Estádio Municipal Sérgio Conceição

===== Round 4 =====
20 December 2026
14:00

São Miguel	32-21	Técnico
Try: 4x Con: x Pen: x Drop: x		Try: 2x Con: x Pen: x Drop: x

Bulldog Rugby Park

20 December 2026
15:00

Direito	47-12	Académica
Try: 7x Con: x Pen: x Drop: x		Try: 2x Con: x Pen: x Drop: x

Complexo Desportivo Miguel Nobre Ferreira

===== Round 5 =====
10 January 2026
15:00

Académica	29-38	São Miguel
Try: 4x Con: x Pen: x Drop: x		Try: 6x Con: x Pen: x Drop: x

Estádio Municipal Sérgio Conceição

10 January 2026
12:00

Técnico	24-59	Direito
Try: 4x Con: x Pen: x Drop: x		Try: 9x Con: x Pen: x Drop: x

Campo das Olaias

===== Round 6 =====
17 January 2026
16:00

São Miguel	22-33	Direito
Try: 3x Con: x Pen: x Drop: x		Try: 5x Con: x Pen: x Drop: x

Bulldog Rugby Park

17 January 2026
16:00

Técnico	26-22	Académica
Try: 4x Con: x Pen: x Drop: x		Try: 3x Con: x Pen: x Drop: x

Campo das Olaias

=== Final Phase ===
==== Champion Group ====
Champion Group Table
	Club	Played	Won	Drawn	Lost	Points For	Points Against	Points Diff.	Try Bonus	Losing Bonus	Points
1	Benfica	10	7	1	2	259	175	84	3	1	34
2	Cascais	10	7	0	3	339	182	157	4	1	33
3	Direito	10	7	0	3	268	179	89	4	1	33
4	Belenenses	10	4	0	6	223	234	-11	3	2	21
5	CDUL	10	4	1	5	258	241	17	2	1	21
6	São Miguel	10	0	0	10	120	456	-336	0	0	0
Green background (rows 1) crowned champion. Updated: 11 June 2026

===== Round 1 =====
24 January 2026
14:00

Cascais	21-8	CDUL
Try: 2x Con: x Pen: x Drop: x		Try: 1x Con: 0x Pen: x Drop: x

Estádio Municipal Dramático Cascais

25 January 2026
12:00

Direito	13-25	Benfica
Try: 1x Con: x Pen: x Drop: x		Try: 4x Con: x Pen: x Drop: x

Complexo Desportivo Miguel Nobre Ferreira

24 January 2026
18:00

Belenenses	40-19	São Miguel
Try: 6x Con: x Pen: x Drop: x		Try: 3x Con: x Pen: x Drop: x

Belém Rugby Park

===== Round 2 =====
31 January 2026
15:00

CDUL	16-39	Direito
Try: 1x Con: x Pen: x Drop: x		Try: 5x Con: x Pen: x Drop: x

Estádio Universitário de Lisboa

31 January 2026
15:00

São Miguel	10-77	Cascais
Try: 1x Con: x Pen: x Drop: x		Try: 11x Con: x Pen: x Drop: x

Bulldog Rugby Park

01 February 2026
16:00

Benfica	6-13	Belenenses
Try: 0x Con: 0x Pen: x Drop: x		Try: 1x Con: x Pen: x Drop: x

Campo nº2 Lisbon University

===== Round 3 =====
21 March 2026
15:00

Belenenses	43-31	CDUL
Try: 7x Con: x Pen: x Drop: x		Try: 4x Con: x Pen: x Drop: x

Belém Rugby Park

21 March 2026
18:00

Direito	13-9	Cascais
Try: 1x Con: x Pen: x Drop: x		Try: 0x Con: 0x Pen: x Drop: x

Complexo Desportivo Miguel Nobre Ferreira

22 March 2026
14:00

São Miguel	0-29	Benfica
Try: 0x Con: 0x Pen: x Drop: x		Try: 5x Con: x Pen: x Drop: x

Bulldog Rugby Park

===== Round 4 =====
28 March 2026
20:00

CDUL	27-33	Benfica
Try: 3x Con: x Pen: x Drop: x		Try: 3x Con: x Pen: x Drop: x

Estádio Universitário de Lisboa

28 March 2026
14:00

Cascais	28-15	Belenenses
Try: 1x Con: x Pen: x Drop: x		Try: 2x Con: x Pen: x Drop: x

Estádio Municipal Dramático Cascais

28 March 2026
17:00

Direito	38-3	São Miguel
Try: 6x Con: x Pen: x Drop: x		Try: 0x Con: 0x Pen: x Drop: x

Complexo Desportivo Miguel Nobre Ferreira

===== Round 5 =====
04 April 2026
13:00

São Miguel	14-38	CDUL
Try: 2x Con: x Pen: x Drop: x		Try: 5x Con: x Pen: x Drop: x

Bulldog Rugby Park

03 April 2026
15:00

Benfica	42-28	Cascais
Try: 5x Con: x Pen: x Drop: x		Try: 3x Con: x Pen: x Drop: x

Campo nº2 Lisbon University

03 April 2026
17:00

Belenenses	16-21	Direito
Try: 1x Con: x Pen: x Drop: x		Try: 2x Con: x Pen: x Drop: x

Belém Rugby Park

===== Round 6 =====
11 April 2026
15:00

CDUL	14-35	Cascais
Try: 1x Con: x Pen: x Drop: x		Try: 4x Con: x Pen: x Drop: x

Estádio Universitário de Lisboa

12 April 2026
16:00

Benfica	24-17	Direito
Try: 3x Con: x Pen: x Drop: x		Try: 2x Con: x Pen: x Drop: x

Campo nº2 Lisbon University

11 April 2026
18:00

São Miguel	19-45	Belenenses
Try: 3x Con: x Pen: x Drop: x		Try: 7x Con: x Pen: x Drop: x

Bulldog Rugby Park

===== Round 7 =====
26 April 2026
12:00

Direito	12-27	CDUL
Try: 2x Con: x Pen: x Drop: x		Try: 3x Con: x Pen: x Drop: x

Complexo Desportivo Miguel Nobre Ferreira

25 April 2026
17:00

Cascais	61-17	São Miguel
Try: 9x Con: x Pen: x Drop: x		Try: 2x Con: x Pen: x Drop: x

Estádio Municipal Dramático Cascais

25 April 2026
13:00

Belenenses	15-21	Benfica
Try: 2x Con: x Pen: x Drop: x		Try: 2x Con: x Pen: x Drop: x

Belém Rugby Park

===== Round 8 =====
01 May 2026
15:00

CDUL	23-10	Belenenses
Try: 2x Con: x Pen: x Drop: x		Try: 2x Con: x Pen: x Drop: x

Estádio Universitário de Lisboa

01 May 2026
18:00

Cascais	21-37	Direito
Try: 2x Con: x Pen: x Drop: x		Try: 4x Con: x Pen: x Drop: x

Estádio Municipal Dramático Cascais

03 May 2026
16:00

Benfica	38-7	São Miguel
Try: 6x Con: x Pen: x Drop: x		Try: 1x Con: x Pen: x Drop: x

Campo nº2 Lisbon University

===== Round 9 =====
09 May 2026
17:00

Benfica	27-27	CDUL
Try: 2x Con: x Pen: x Drop: x		Try: 3x Con: x Pen: x Drop: x

Campo nº2 Lisbon University

10 May 2026
15:00

Belenenses	12-31	Cascais
Try: 2x Con: x Pen: x Drop: x		Try: 5x Con: x Pen: x Drop: x

Belém Rugby Park

09 May 2026
15:00

São Miguel	24-43	Direito
Try: 3x Con: x Pen: x Drop: x		Try: 7x Con: x Pen: x Drop: x

Bulldog Rugby Park

===== Round 10 =====
16 May 2026
17:00

CDUL	47-7	São Miguel
Try: 7x Con: x Pen: x Drop: x		Try: 1x Con: 1x Pen: x Drop: x

Estádio Universitário de Lisboa

16 May 2026
17:00

Cascais	28-14	Benfica
Try: 4x Con: x Pen: x Drop: x		Try: 2x Con: x Pen: x Drop: x

Estádio Municipal Dramático Cascais

16 May 2026
17:00

Direito	35-14	Belenenses
Try: 5x Con: x Pen: x Drop: x		Try: 2x Con: x Pen: x Drop: x

Complexo Desportivo Miguel Nobre Ferreira

== Leading scorers ==
=== Most points ===
As of 30 May 2026

Rank	Player	Club	Points
1	(Argentina) Santiago Jara	Cascais	239
2	(Portugal) Hugo Trigueiro	Técnico	169
3	(Argentina) Joaquin Mihura	Direito	153
4	(Brazil) Francisco Sanchis Bouzas	RC Santarém	124
5	(Portugal) Francisco Menéres	Belenenses	106
6	(Belgium) Hugo de Franq	Agronomia	105
7	(Germany) Bader Pretorius	São Miguel	99
8	(Portugal) Jorge Abecasis	CDUL	98
9	(South Africa) Charles Williams	Académica	88
10	(Argentina) Juan Pablo Castro	Benfica	87

=== Most tries ===
As of 30 May 2026

Rank	Player	Club	Tries
1	(Portugal) Rodrigo Bento	Técnico	14
2	(Republic of Ireland) Elliott Ryan	Benfica	12
2	(Portugal) Alfredo Almeida	Cascais	12
4	(Argentina) Ignacio Migliore	Belenenses	11
4	(Portugal) Manuel Cardoso Pinto	Agronomia	11
6	(Portugal) João Vaz Antunes	Direito	10
7	(Republic of Ireland) Ciarian Roberts	Agronomia	9
7	(Portugal) Francisco Cabral	Agronomia	9
7	(Samoa) Pisi Leilua	Técnico	9

== Player of year ==
At the end of the season, "Linha de Ensaio" publishes the Oval d'Ouro for the Top12. This award, voted on by the coaches and team captains of the teams that competed in the competition, rewards the best player in the championship.

#	Name	Club	Pts
1	(Republic of Ireland) Elliott Ryan	Benfica	92
2	(Argentina) Santiago Jara	Cascais	37
3	(Portugal) Guilherme Vasconcelos	Benfica	11
4	(Portugal) Manuel Fati	Benfica	10
4	(Argentina) Juan Pablo Castro	Benfica	10
5	(Portugal) João Vaz Antunes	Direito	8

== Squads 2025/26 ==
Squads are ordered by the last classification of the league. According to Portuguese Rugby Federation

The Belenenses squad for the 2025–26 Campeonato Nacional de Rugby season
**Props**: (Czech Republic) **Anthony Kent** ^{LUS}; (Spain) **Joaquin Dominguez**; (Chile) **Lucas Bordigoni**; (Portugal) **Manuel Worm**; (Portugal) Frederico Simões; (Portugal) Bernardo Veiga; **Hookers**: (Argentina) Guillermo Lawrie; (Portugal) Miguel Nunes ^{LUS}; (Portugal) Diogo Norton; **Locks**: (Uruguay) **Ignacio Dotti**; (Portugal) **Salvador da Cunha** ^{LUS}; (Portugal) José Moreira; (Portugal) Francisco Simões; (Portugal) Tomás da Cunha; (Portugal) Martim Ferreira	**Backrow**: (Portugal) **Rafael Simões** ^{LUS}; (Portugal) **David Wallis** ^{LUS}; (Portugal) **Vasco Baptista** ^{LUS}; (Portugal) **André Cunha** ^{LUS}; (Portugal) Manuel Pinto ^{LUS}; (Portugal) Tomás Sequeira; (Portugal) Sebastião da Cunha; (Portugal) Diogo Raposo; (Portugal) Pedro Cunha; (Portugal) Lourenço Cunha; **Scrum-halves**: (Portugal) **Duarte Azevedo** ^{LUS}; (Portugal) Francisco Macedo; (Portugal) João Menéres; **Fly-halves**: (Portugal) Francisco Menéres ^{LUS}; (Portugal) António Menéres; (Portugal) Manuel Menéres	**Three-quarters**: (Portugal) **José Paiva dos Santos** ^{LUS}; (Portugal) **Duarte Moreira** ^{LUS}; (Portugal) **Diogo Rodrigues** ^{LUS}; (Wales) Owen Jenkins; (Australia) Jordan Paes Bacon* ^{LUS}; (Australia) Samuel Paes Bacon* ^{LUS}; (New Zealand) Alex Thrupp; (Argentina) Ignacio Migliore; (Portugal) Lourenço Pedras; (Portugal) Gonçalo Santos; (Portugal) Tomás Monteiro; (Portugal) Francisco Galveias; (Portugal) Tomás Reis; (Portugal) João H. de Melo; **Fullbacks**: (Portugal) Salvador da Cunha Jr. ^{LUS}; (Portugal) Francisco Murta
(c) denotes the team captain: **Bold** denotes internationally capped players.; **LUS** denotes Lusitanos capped players.; ^{*} denotes players qualified to play for Portugal on residency or dual nationality.

The Cascais squad for the 2025–26 Campeonato Nacional de Rugby season
**Props**: (Portugal) **José Lavos** ^{LUS}; (Argentina) Nicolas Griffiths ^{LUS}; (Argentina) José Martinez; (Argentina) Ignácio Urueña; (Portugal) Duarte Conde ^{LUS}; **Hookers**: (Portugal) **Santiago Lopes** ^{LUS}; (Portugal) **Nuno Mascarenhas** ^{LUS}; **Locks**: (Portugal) **Boaventura Almeida** ^{LUS}; (Portugal) **Martim Belo** ^{LUS}; (Portugal) Alexandre Fonseca Rodrigues ^{LUS}; (Portugal) Manuel Barros ^{LUS}; (Argentina) Israel Parnas; (Portugal) António Carvalho Martins; (Portugal) Luis Graça; (Portugal) Francisco Aranha Martins	**Backrow**: (Portugal) **Francisco Sousa**; (Portugal) **Duarte Costa Campos**; (Portugal) Lourenço Durão ^{LUS}; (Portugal) Sebastião Petronilho; (Portugal) Francisco Martins; (Portugal) Dinis Pitta; (Portugal) Gonçalo Carvalho; (Portugal) António Andrade; (Portugal) Manuel Soares; **Scrum-halves**: (England) Noah Nash; (Argentina) Rafael Iriarte; (Portugal) Duarte Cardoso ^{LUS}; (Portugal) Francisco Carmona Costa; (Portugal) Tomás Martins; **Fly-halves**: (Argentina) Santiago Jara; (Portugal) Francisco Pissarra	**Three-quarters**: (Portugal) **António Vidinha** ^{LUS}; (Portugal) **Francisco Vassalo**; (Northern Ireland) Maximilien Coutts* ^{LUS}; (Portugal) Vasco Durão ^{LUS}; (Portugal) Francisco C. Campos; (Portugal) José Villar Gomes; (Portugal) António Sousa; (Portugal) Luis Ferros; (Portugal) Duarte Tavares; **Fullbacks**: (Portugal) Vasco Correia ^{LUS}; (Portugal) Alfredo Almeida ^{LUS}; (Portugal) José Lopes; (Portugal) Henrique Matias
(c) denotes the team captain: **Bold** denotes internationally capped players.; **LUS** denotes Lusitanos capped players.; ^{*} denotes players qualified to play for Portugal on residency or dual nationality.

The São Miguel squad for the 2025–26 Campeonato Nacional de Rugby season
**Props**: (Fiji) **Robert Delai**; (Argentina) Matias Bueso; (Argentina) Ramiro Pennella; (Argentina) Alexander Arroyo; (Portugal) Tiago Quitério; (Portugal) Afonso Loureiro; (Portugal) Tomas Fernandes Campos; **Hookers**: (England) Jake Pope; (Argentina) Thomas Goyochea; **Locks**: (Brazil) **Felipe Rosa**; (Argentina) Nicolas Bertoldi; (Portugal) Pedro Oliveira; (Portugal) Vicente Trancoso; (Portugal) Duarte Carolino	**Backrow**: (South Africa) Sabata Mokhachane* ^{LUS}; (England) Joseph Duffy; (Portugal) Miguel Orrico; (Portugal) Sebastião Petronilho; (Portugal) Sebastião Coelho; (Portugal) Bernardo Carrelo; **Scrum-halves**: (Portugal) João Bandeira; (Portugal) Tomás Trincheiras; **Fly-halves**: (Germany) **Bader Pretorius** (c); (Argentina) Agustin Altamirano; (Portugal) Francisco Teixeira; (Portugal) Tomás Aquino	**Three-quarters**: (Argentina) Nacho Huaier de la Vega; (Zimbabwe) Bright Matimba; (South Africa) Allistair Mumba; (France) Evrard Blain; (Portugal) José Pena Monteiro; (Portugal) João Tavares; (Portugal) Duarte Branquinho; (Portugal) Ricardo Rosa; (Portugal) Leandro Ceita; (Portugal) Francisco Cardoso; (Portugal) João Ruivo; (Portugal) Jorge Anjinho; (Portugal) Rafael Ferreira; **Fullbacks**: (Italy) Andrea Ragno*; (Portugal) Miguel Martins; (Portugal) Tiago Girão
(c) denotes the team captain: **Bold** denotes internationally capped players.; **LUS** denotes Lusitanos capped players.; ^{*} denotes players qualified to play for Portugal on residency or dual nationality.

The Direito squad for the 2025–26 Campeonato Nacional de Rugby season
**Props**: (Portugal) **David Costa** ^{LUS}; (Portugal) **António Prim** ^{LUS}; (Portugal) **José Lupi**; (Portugal) **Luis Lopes**; (Portugal) **Afonso Tapadinhas**; (Argentina) Javier Corvalan; (Argentina) Giovanni Ramallo; (Portugal) André Bardziy ^{LUS}; (Portugal) Lourenço Moita; (Portugal) João Pissarra; (Portugal) Leandro Nunes; **Hookers**: (Portugal) **Duarte Diniz** ^{LUS}; (Argentina) Fabian Contreras; **Locks**: (Portugal) **Duarte Torgal** ^{LUS}; (Portugal) **Pedro Ferreira** ^{LUS}; (Portugal) **Duarte Pedro Nunes** ^{LUS}; (Portugal) António Peixoto ^{LUS}; (Portugal) Henrique Cortes; (Portugal) Nuno Pina	**Backrow**: (Portugal) **Manuel Picão** ^{LUS}; (Portugal) **João Granate** (c) ^{LUS}; (Portugal) **Pedro Afra Rosa**; (Argentina) Tomas Suárez; (Portugal) João Vital; (Portugal) Mateus Ferreira; (Portugal) Miguel Romero Rodrigues; (Portugal) António Mello; (Portugal) Diogo Matos; (Portugal) Luis Pina; (Portugal) Frederico Castello Branco; (Portugal) Guilherme Spratley; **Scrum-halves**: (Portugal) **João Dias** ^{LUS}; (Portugal) Afonso Castiñeira; (Portugal) Salvador Seabra; **Fly-halves**: (Argentina) Joaquin Mihura; (Portugal) Martim Dias; (Portugal) Bernardo Nogueira	**Three-quarters**: (Portugal) João Afra Rosa ^{LUS}; (Portugal) Francisco Afra Rosa ^{LUS}; (Portugal) Manuel Reis ^{LUS}; (Argentina) Joaquin Bustos; (Portugal) Francisco Nobre; (Portugal) José Ferreira; (Portugal) João Burnay; (Portugal) Francisco Teixeira; (Portugal) Tomás Cary; (Portugal) Francisco Pinto; (Portugal) Manuel Romero Rodrigues; (Portugal) Hugo Miguel Cristóvão; **Fullbacks**: (Portugal) **Caetano Castelo Branco**; (Portugal) João Vaz Antunes; (Portugal) Martim Dias; (Portugal) Duarte Matos; (Portugal) Frederico Roquette; (Portugal) Francisco Perloiro
(c) denotes the team captain: **Bold** denotes internationally capped players.; **LUS** denotes Lusitanos capped players.; ^{*} denotes players qualified to play for Portugal on residency or dual nationality.

The CDUL squad for the 2025–26 Campeonato Nacional de Rugby season
**Props**: (Brazil) **Matheus Rocha**; (Argentina) Mariano Leiva; (Argentina) Mariano Filomeno; (Portugal) António Maltez; (Portugal) José Almeida; (Portugal) Gonçalo Alves; (Portugal) António Carmona; (Portugal) Vicente Almeida; **Hookers**: (Portugal) **Duarte Foro** ^{LUS}; (Argentina) Matias Secco; (Portugal) Samuel Marques; (Portugal) Manuel Magriço; **Locks**: (Portugal) Francisco Almeida ^{LUS}; (Portugal) Diogo D'Almeida ^{LUS}; (Portugal) Guilherme Monteiro; (Portugal) Domingos Gonçalves; (Portugal) Flávio Carvalho; (Argentina) Tobias Ruffino	**Backrow**: (Portugal) **José Libano Monteiro** ^{LUS}; (Portugal) **José Roque** ^{LUS}; (Portugal) **Xavier Cerejo** ^{LUS}; (Portugal) Francisco Borges; (Portugal) Francisco Pinto; (Portugal) Rodrigo Oliveira; (Portugal) Nuno Macedo; (Portugal) Francisco Tavares; (Portugal) David Gracioso; (Portugal) Afonso Sousa; (Portugal) Eduardo Queiróz; (Portugal) Guilherme Rodrigues; (Portugal) Martim Almeida; (Portugal) Luis Moreira; **Scrum-halves**: (Portugal) **Francisco Magalhães** ^{LUS}; (Portugal) Vasco Félix António; (Portugal) Duarte Cortes; (Portugal) Martim Domingues; (Portugal) Tiago Domingues; **Fly-halves**: (Portugal) **Jorge Abecasis** ^{LUS}; (Portugal) António Nuncio; (Portugal) Faustino Gama; (Portugal) José Cerejo; (Portugal) Pedro Neiva	**Three-quarters**: (Portugal) **Tomás Appleton** ^{LUS}; (Portugal) **Martim Faro** ^{LUS}; (Portugal) **Tomás Noronha**; (Portugal) **Francisco Appleton**; (Argentina) Ignacio Albornoz; (Argentina) Gonzalo Albornoz; (Portugal) João Vieira ^{LUS}; (Portugal) João Cardoso; (Portugal) Afonso Alvarez; (Portugal) Bernardo Canas; (Portugal) Duarte Duarte; (Portugal) Xavier Gama; (Portugal) João Cardoso; (Portugal) Hussein Sacoor; (Portugal) Pedro Coito; (Portugal) Salvador Silva; (Portugal) Tomé Lobo; (Portugal) Guilherme Oliveira; **Fullbacks**: (South Africa) Shane Van Rooyen; (Portugal) Pedro Roldão; (Portugal) Manuel Salgado
(c) denotes the team captain: **Bold** denotes internationally capped players.; **LUS** denotes Lusitanos capped players.; ^{*} denotes players qualified to play for Portugal on residency or dual nationality.

The Benfica squad for the 2025–26 Campeonato Nacional de Rugby season
**Props**: (Canada) **Samuel Miller**; (Colombia) **Juan David Henao**; (Uruguay) **Santiago Cagnone**; (England) Oliver Adkins; (Portugal) José Maria Pereira; (Portugal) Serafim Djassi; (Portugal) Gonçalo Jorge; (Portugal) Tomás Boavida; **Hookers**: (South Africa) Jason Cornelius ^{LUS}; (Portugal) Pedro Gouveia; (Portugal) Eduardo Gomes; (Portugal) Isaías Camará; **Locks**: (Canada) **Izzak Kelly**; (Canada) **Karl Hunger**; (Italy) Giuseppe Piacenza; (Portugal) Eurico Chichorro; (Portugal) Afonso Boavida; (Portugal) Vicente Quaresma	**Backrow**: (Portugal) **Frederico Couto** ^{LUS}; (Portugal) Manuel Fati ^{LUS}; (Portugal) Frederico Silva; (Portugal) Tomás Picado; (Portugal) Pedro Ismael Tavares; (Portugal) Rui Duarte; (Portugal) João Ferreira; **Scrum-halves**: (Portugal) **António Campos** ^{LUS}; (Ireland) Elliott Ryan; (Portugal) Luís Chança; **Fly-halves**: (Portugal) **João Lima**	**Three-quarters**: (Portugal) **José Lima** ^{LUS}; (Portugal) **Guilherme Vasconcelos** ^{LUS}; (Argentina) Juan Pablo Castro; (Argentina) Leopoldo Herrera; (New Zealand) Hayden Hann; (South Africa) Kyle Alves*; (Portugal) Rodrigo Urzay Soares; (Portugal) Edgar Monteiro; (Portugal) Harrison Stock; (Portugal) Diego Caeiro; (Portugal) Francisco Costa; (Portugal) Rodrigo Sampaio; (Portugal) Zé Miguel Carvalho; (Guinea-Bissau) Felisbelo Vieira*; **Fullbacks**: (Portugal) **José Rodrigues**; (Portugal) António Valadares; (Portugal) António Alves
(c) denotes the team captain: **Bold** denotes internationally capped players.; **LUS** denotes Lusitanos capped players.; ^{*} denotes players qualified to play for Portugal on residency or dual nationality.

The Agronomia squad for the 2025–26 Campeonato Nacional de Rugby season
**Props**: (Portugal) **Francisco Domingues** ^{LUS}; (Paraguay) **Daniel Cabral**; (Argentina) Rodrigo Correa; (New Zealand) Hayze Nepia; (Australia) Dante Santos*; (Angola) Abraão Ambrósio*; (Portugal) Nicolau Turabelidze ^{LUS}; (Portugal) Luís Souto Barreiros; (Portugal) Salvador Oostergettel; (Portugal) António Quiroga; (Portugal) Diogo Carvalho; **Hookers**: (Portugal) **Pedro Vicente** ^{LUS}; (Portugal) Hugo Oliveira; (Portugal) Joaquim Raimundo; (Portugal) Bernardo Cardoso; (Portugal) Eduardo Uva; **Locks**: (Portugal) **José Rebelo de Andrade** ^{LUS}; (Portugal) **António Rebelo de Andrade** ^{LUS}; (New Zealand) Manase Taufa; (Portugal) Pedro Herédia; (Portugal) Bernardo B. Cardoso; (Portugal) Simão Salgueiro; (Portugal) Diogo Carvalho; (Portugal) Manuel Bação; (Portugal) Luís Rodolfo; (Portugal) António Maria Andrade; (Portugal) Vasco Queiroz	**Backrow**: (New Zealand) Tevyn Anitelea; (New Zealand) Joshua Retter; (Portugal) Francisco Cabral (c) ^{LUS}; (Portugal) Diogo Sarmento ^{LUS}; (Portugal) Manuel Navalhinhas; (Portugal) João P. Fernandes; (Portugal) Francisco Uva; (Portugal) Vicente Guerra Pinto; (Portugal) Duarte Vasco Costa; (Portugal) João Louro; (Portugal) José Ramalho; **Scrum-halves**: (Portugal) **Tomás Amado** ^{LUS}; (Portugal) Duarte Alves; (Portugal) Frederico Barbosa; **Fly-halves**: (Belgium) **Hugo de Franq**; (Portugal) **Domingos Cabral** ^{LUS}; (Portugal) Simão Sousa; (Portugal) José Maria Cunha	**Three-quarters**: (Portugal) **Vasco Ribeiro** ^{LUS}; (Canada) **D'Shawn Bowen**; (Portugal) Vasco Leite ^{LUS}; (Portugal) Sebastião Cardoso; (Portugal) José do Carmo Câmara; (Portugal) José Carmo; (Portugal) Bernardo Valente; (Portugal) Manuel Ramalho; (Portugal) José Cortes Pena Monteiro; (Portugal) Vasco Câmara; (Portugal) António Pena Monteiro; (Portugal) Pedro Ribeiro; (Portugal) Rodrigo Castanheira; (Portugal) Eduardo Leite; (Portugal) Salvador Botelho; (Portugal) João Castro; (Portugal) Salvador Cabral; **Full-back**: (Portugal) **Manuel Cardoso Pinto** ^{LUS}; (Ireland) Ciarian Roberts; (Portugal) Gonçalo Vasco Costa; (Portugal) Afonso Vinagre; (Portugal) Luis Heredia
(c) denotes the team captain: **Bold** denotes internationally capped players.; **LUS** denotes Lusitanos capped players.; ^{*} denotes players qualified to play for Portugal on residency or dual nationality.

The CDUP squad for the 2025–26 Campeonato Nacional de Rugby season
**Props**: (Portugal) **João Vasco Côrte-Real**; (Portugal) **Filipe Granja**; (Argentina) Julian Ramos; (Netherlands) Maik Timmerman; (Portugal) António Magalhães ^{LUS}; (Portugal) Bernardo Coelho; (Portugal) Nuno Figueiredo; (Portugal) Henrique Freitas; **Hookers**: (Argentina) Agustin Lescano; (Portugal) António Terroso; (Portugal) Gonçalo Sousa Soares; **Locks**: (Portugal) Gonçalo Seruca; (Portugal) Rodrigo Mateus; (Portugal) Henrique Vieira; (Portugal) João Silva	**Backrow**: (Argentina) Lorenzo Cicarelli; (Uruguay) Francisco Bartorelli; (Portugal) Luis Avides Moreira ^{LUS}; (Portugal) Henrique Santos; (Portugal) António Pires; (Portugal) Luis Leão; (Portugal) Francisco Figueiredo; **Scrum-halves**: (Argentina) Santiago Burgos; **Fly-halves**: (Portugal) Tiago Rocha; (Portugal) Nuno Rocha; (Portugal) Lourenço Cardoso	**Three-quarters**: (Portugal) Mateus Libório Tavares ^{LUS}; (Netherlands) Mika Zetzema; (Ukraine) Ihor Lutsenko; (Portugal) Tomás Marrana; (Portugal) Lucas Velo; (Portugal) Afonso Aguiar; (Portugal) José Diogo; (Portugal) Salvador Cardoso; (Portugal) Tomás Ferronha; (Portugal) Miguel Trepa; **Fullbacks**: (Portugal) **Nuno Sousa Guedes** ^{LUS}; (Portugal) Nuno Maia; (Portugal) Luis Agrelos
(c) denotes the team captain: **Bold** denotes internationally capped players.; **LUS** denotes Lusitanos capped players.; ^{*} denotes players qualified to play for Portugal on residency or dual nationality.

The Académica squad for the 2025–26 Campeonato Nacional de Rugby season
**Props**: (Brazil) **Alexandre Alves**; (Brazil) João Henrique Arnaud; (Portugal) Afonso Machado; (Portugal) João Claúdio Dos Santos; (Portugal) Francisco Gonçalves; (Portugal) Martim Pereira; **Hookers**: (Portugal) **João Mateus** ^{LUS}; (Argentina) Ignacio Failla; (Portugal) João Aguiar; (Portugal) João Sousa; **Locks**: (Portugal) **Sérgio Duarte Franco**; (Brazil) **Matheus Wolf** (c); (Brazil) **Kauã Guimarães**; (Brazil) Artur Lima; (Portugal) Gonçalo Costa; (Portugal) Daniel Almeida; (Portugal) Francisco Teles; (Portugal) Diogo Sanches; (Portugal) Guilherme Coelho	**Backrow**: (Brazil) **Diogo Paixão Santos**; (Wales) Joe Greaves; (Portugal) Edmundo Ferreira ^{LUS}; (Portugal) Miguel André; (Portugal) Francisco Silva; (Portugal) Francisco Curica; (Portugal) Francisco Rovira; (Portugal) Afonso Cabral; (Portugal) Vasco Tojo; (Portugal) Pedro Arinto; (Portugal) Miguel Prata; **Scrum-halves**: (Brazil) **Rafael Gattino**; (Portugal) José Fernandes; (Portugal) Silvio Costa; **Fly-halves**: (South Africa) Charles Williams; (South Africa) Ron McCrimmon; (Portugal) Gustavo Rocha; (Portugal) Joaquim Couto	**Three-quarters**: (Portugal) **João Diogo Silva**; (Brazil) **Victor Guilherme Souza**; (Portugal) João Cunha ^{LUS}; (Portugal) David Tender Gomes ^{LUS}; (Portugal) António Pinto Costa ^{LUS}; (Portugal) Francisco Migueis; (Portugal) Edson Paulino; (Portugal) Nuno Fernandes; (Portugal) Afonso Monteiro; (Portugal) Nuno Cardoso; **Fullbacks**: (Ireland) Ross Doogan; (Portugal) Tiago Pintão; (Portugal) Gaspar Neto; (Portugal) Rodrigo Silva; (Portugal) Francisco Carrito
(c) denotes the team captain: **Bold** denotes internationally capped players.; **LUS** denotes Lusitanos capped players.; ^{*} denotes players qualified to play for Portugal on residency or dual nationality.

The CR Técnico squad for the 2025–26 Campeonato Nacional de Rugby season
**Props**: (Portugal) **André Arrojado** ^{LUS}; (New Zealand) Tevita Langi; (Portugal) João Nobre; (Portugal) Diogo Teixeira; (Portugal) Vasco Tavares; (Portugal) João Lobo; **Hookers**: (Portugal) **Rodrigo Bento** ^{LUS}; (Portugal) Miguel Seoane; (Portugal) Manuel Barral; **Locks**: (Samoa) **Jonathan Toelupe**; (Portugal) **Guilherme Costa** ^{LUS}; (Portugal) Afonso Cirilo; (Portugal) Gonçalo Costa; (Portugal) Estevão Baltazar; (Portugal) Miguel Pereira; (Portugal) Alexandre Rosário Silva; (Portugal) Sérgio Medeiro; (Portugal) Simão Medeiro	**Backrow**: (New Zealand) Reegan Wheeler; (New Zealand) Irirangi Taniere; (Portugal) Francisco Silva; (Portugal) Manuel Serrano; (Portugal) João D'Orey; (Portugal) Diogo Teixeira; (Portugal) Tomás Mano; (Portugal) Manuel Maia; (Portugal) Pedro Nunes; **Scrum-halves**: (Portugal) **Pedro Lucas** ^{LUS}; (Portugal) Francisco Pedro; **Fly-halves**: (Portugal) Hugo Trigueiro	**Three-quarters**: (Samoa) **Pisi Leilua**; (New Zealand) Kanavale Helu; (New Zealand) Blake Makiri; (South Africa) Jaryd de Jager; (France) Noah Ménard; (Portugal) Francisco Salgado ^{LUS}; (Portugal) Rodrigo Henriques; (Portugal) António Cardoso; (Portugal) Francisco Vallêra; (Portugal) Lourenço Chambel; (Portugal) Diogo Salgado; (Portugal) Guilherme Sampaio; (Portugal) Henrique Lacerda; **Fullbacks**: (Italy) Levi Conti; (Portugal) Miguel Rosa; (Portugal) Nuno Fradinho
(c) denotes the team captain: **Bold** denotes internationally capped players.; **LUS** denotes Lusitanos capped players.; ^{*} denotes players qualified to play for Portugal on residency or dual nationality.

The RC Montemor squad for the 2025–26 Campeonato Nacional de Rugby season
**Props**: (Argentina) Franco Dellamea; (Fiji) Marika Toga; (Mozambique) Lucas Maundza; (Portugal) António Mendes; (Portugal) António Veiga Malta; (Portugal) Tomé Borrazeiro; **Hookers**: (Georgia (country)) Giorgi Tsverava; (Portugal) Alexandre Palma; **Locks**: (Fiji) Solomoni Kunatauga; (Portugal) Manuel Marques dos Santos; (Portugal) João Potier; (Portugal) Francisco Passareiro; (Portugal) Miguel Cecilio; (Portugal) Manuel Silva Borges	**Backrow**: (United States) Ben Taylor; (Portugal) José Pinto Gouveia; (Portugal) João Camelo; (Portugal) Luis Marques dos Santos; (Portugal) João Vacas de Carvalho; **Scrum-halves**: (Portugal) Afonso Antunes; (Portugal) Ricardo Romeiras; (Portugal) António Vacas; (Portugal) Augusto Mira; **Fly-halves**: (Portugal) Gonçalo Silva; (Portugal) Miguel Casadinho	**Three-quarters**: (France) Yann Lucas; (Mozambique) Manuel Elias Junior; (Portugal) Pedro Silva Borges; (Portugal) Rodrigo Costa Pereira; (Portugal) Miguel Rosa; (Portugal) António Redondo; (Portugal) Francisco Mira; (Portugal) Luis Santos Jorge; (Portugal) Rodrigo Carvoeiro; (Portugal) Pedro Tigre; (Portugal) João Ribeiro; **Fullbacks**: (Argentina) Agustín Iza; (Portugal) José Vacas de Carvalho
(c) denotes the team captain: **Bold** denotes internationally capped players.; **LUS** denotes Lusitanos capped players.; ^{*} denotes players qualified to play for Portugal on residency or dual nationality.

The RC Santarém squad for the 2025–26 Campeonato Nacional de Rugby season
**Props**: (Brazil) **Luan Almeida**; (Brazil) **Aquiles Schlüter**; (Argentina) Alan Falcon; (Portugal) Tomás Santos Silva; (Portugal) Francisco Vinagre; (Portugal) André Gomes; (Portugal) Martim Coste; (Portugal) Filipe Rodrigues; **Hookers**: (Brazil) Jhonatan Dias; (Portugal) João Almeida; (Portugal) António Figueiredo; (Portugal) Diogo Nogueira; **Locks**: (Brazil) **Matheus Daniel**; (Portugal) Francisco Serra; (Portugal) Manuel Campilho; (Portugal) João Valério; (Portugal) Henrique Silva	**Backrow**: (Portugal) Bernando Almeida; (Portugal) João Faro; (Portugal) João Oliveira; (Portugal) António Rosa; (Portugal) Manuel Carreira; (Portugal) Pedro Baptista; (Portugal) Manuel Landureza; (Portugal) Exequiel Ligios; **Scrum-halves**: (Brazil) **Francisco Sanchis Bouzas**; (Portugal) António Prazeres; **Fly-halves**: (Brazil) **Rafael Morales**; (Argentina) Maxi Figueroa; (Portugal) Duarte Palha	**Three-quarters**: (Portugal) Martim Alves; (Portugal) Belgidio Mascarenhas; (Portugal) Tomás Dimas; (Portugal) Tiago Dimas; (Portugal) António Pena Monteiro; (Portugal) Manuel Mira; (Portugal) Alex Vieira; (Portugal) Sabastião Morgado; (Portugal) Rafael Canhoto; (Portugal) João Soares; (Portugal) Francisco Vinagre; (Portugal) José Moreira; **Fullbacks**: (Portugal) Francisco Fonseca; (Portugal) Sabastião Fonseca
(c) denotes the team captain: **Bold** denotes internationally capped players.; **LUS** denotes Lusitanos capped players.; ^{*} denotes players qualified to play for Portugal on residency or dual nationality.

== See also ==
- 2025–26 Rugby Europe Super Cup
- 2025–26 Premiership Rugby
- 2025–26 Top 14 season
- 2025–26 Rugby Pro D2 season
- 2025–26 European Rugby Champions Cup
- 2025–26 EPCR Challenge Cup
- 2025–26 Premiership Rugby Cup
- 2025–26 RFU Championship
- 2025–26 United Rugby Championship
