= Campeonato Nacional de Rugby I Divisão =

Rugby competition in Portugal

- Sport: Rugby union
- No. of teams: 12
- Country: Portugal
- Most recent champion: Montemor

The Campeonato Nacional de Rugby I Divisão is the second tier competition of the Portuguese domestic rugby championship and is organised by the Portuguese Rugby Federation. The winner gets promoted to the Campeonato Português de Rugby and the last positioned team gets relegated to the Campeonato Nacional de Rugby II Divisão. The current champions are Montemor, from Montemor-o-Novo. The league consists of 12 teams.

== Season 2023–24 teams ==
=== Group North ===
- Braga Rugby
- CDUP "B"
- CR Arcos de Valdevez
- Guimarães Rugby

=== Group Center ===
- Bairrada
- Caldas
- Santarém
- Técnico

=== Group South ===
- Évora
- Loulé
- Montemor
- Setúbal

== Champions ==
Season	Champion	Runner-up	3rd place
1963-64	Agronomia	NA	NA
1964-65	Técnico	NA	NA
1965-66 to 1968-69	Not held
1969-70	Belenenses	NA	NA
1970-71	AE Fac. Medicina Lisboa	NA	NA
1971-72	São Miguel	NA	NA
1972-73	Estrela da Amadora	NA	NA
1973-74	E.Regentes Agrícolas Coimbra	NA	NA
1974-75	SL Benfica B	NA	NA
1975-76	SL Benfica B	NA	NA
1976-77	CDUP	NA	NA
1977-78	Estrela da Amadora	NA	NA
1978-79	CDUP	NA	NA
1979-80	Técnico	NA	NA
1980-81	Cascais	NA	NA
1981-82	Cascais	NA	NA
1982-83	Agronomia	NA	NA
1983-84	Benfica	NA	NA
1984-85	CDUP	NA	NA
1985-86	Técnico	NA	NA
1986-87	Universidade Livre	NA	NA
1987-88	AE Fac. Medicina do Porto	NA	NA
1988-89	CD Moitense	NA	NA
1989-90	Loulé	NA	NA
1990-91	CDUP	NA	NA
1991-92	CRAV	NA	NA
1992-93	Évora	NA	NA
1993-94	Académica	CRAV	NA
1994-95	Agronomia	NA	NA
1995-96	Benfica	NA	NA
1996-97	Direito	NA	NA
1997-98	UTAD	NA	NA
1998-99	Costa da Caparica	NA	NA
1999-00	CDUL	NA	NA
2000-01	UTAD	Montemor	Caldas
2001-02	Lousã	Évora	Caldas
2002-03	Évora	Montemor	Tecnologia
2003-04	Cascais	Técnico	Lousã
2004-05	Técnico	CRAV	Lousã
2005-06	Cascais	CRAV	Lousã
2006-07	Académica	Évora	Lousã
2007-08	Técnico	Lousã	Évora
2008-09	Académica	Vitória de Setúbal	Évora
2009-10	CRAV	Évora	Lousã
2010-11	CDUP	Cascais	Évora
2011-12	Cascais	CRAV	Lousã
2012-13	Montemor	Évora	Lousã
2013-14	Caldas	Lousã	Évora & Benfica
2014-15	Lousã	Évora	Santarém & Benfica
2015-16	Montemor	Évora	Santarém & Benfica
2016-17	Benfica	Évora	Bairrada & CRAV
2017-18	CRAV	São Miguel	Guimarães Rugby & Caldas
2018-19	Montemor	Benfica	Lousã & Évora
2019-20	Not held (due to covid-19)
2020-21	Évora	Santarém	NA
2021-22	Lousã	Santarém	NA
2022-23	Montemor	Caldas	NA
2023-24	Técnico	-	-

== See also ==
- Rugby union in Portugal
