= Campeonato Português de Rugby =

Rugby union competition in Portugal

Campeonato Nacional de Rugby Divisão de Honra
- Current season, competition or edition: 2026–27 Campeonato Nacional de Rugby Divisão de Honra
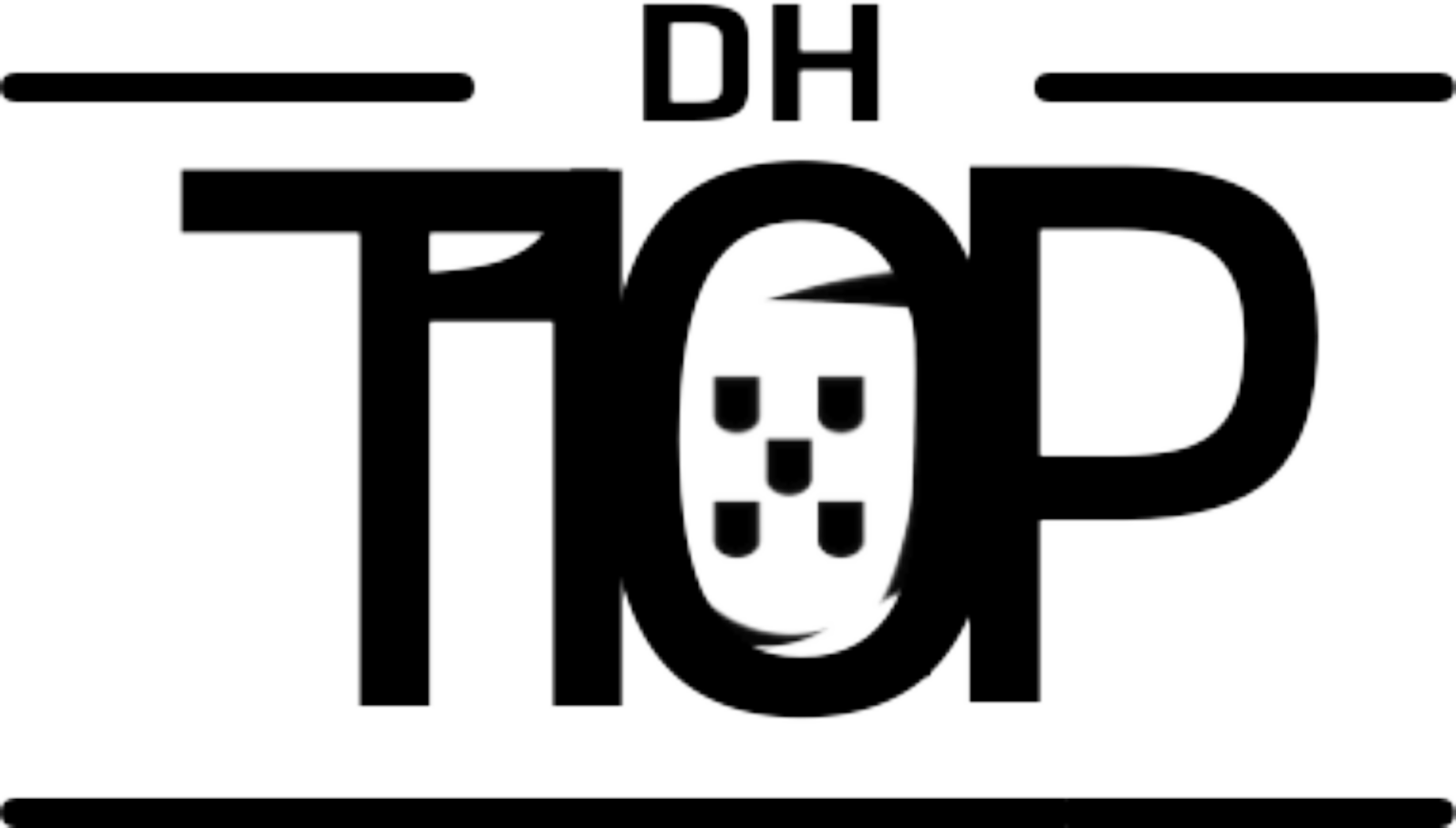
- Formerly: Campeonato SuperBock
- Sport: Rugby union
- Founded: 1958; 68 years ago
- First season: 1958
- Owner: Federação Portuguesa de Rugby
- No. of teams: 12
- Country: Portugal
- Most recent champion: Benfica
- Most titles: CDUL (20 titles)
- Broadcaster: RugbyTV.pt (Live Streams)
- Relegation to: Campeonato Nacional de Rugby I Divisão
- International cups: European Rugby Challenge Cup; European Rugby Continental Shield
- Related competitions: Taça de Portugal de Rugby; Supertaça de Portugal de Rugby
- Website: fpr.pt

The Campeonato Nacional de Rugby Divisão de Honra (more commonly known as the Divisão de Honra) is Portugal's top level professional men's rugby union competition. The Divisão de Honra Championships are organised by the Federação Portuguesa de Rugby (Portuguese Rugby Federation) and currently consists of 12 teams. The last placed team in the competition is relegated at the end of the season to the Campeonato Nacional de Rugby I Divisão (Portugal's second level of men's rugby union) with one team from the second-tier competition promoting to the Divisão de Honra.

== Format ==
The Divisão de Honra season takes place between September and March, with three teams being randomly drawn into four groups, playing each other home and away twice for a total of 6 matches per group (24 matches in total). Points are awarded according to the following:

- 4 points for a win
- 2 points for a draw
- 1 bonus point is awarded to a team scoring 4 tries or more in a match
- 1 bonus point is awarded to a team that loses a match by 7 points or fewer

The highest placed teams with the highest number of points within each group will meet each other in a round-robin play-off to determine the champions of the Divisão de Honra while the two bottom placed teams in each group will play in a round-robin play-out to determine which team (that finishes last place) will be relegated in the respective season.

=== Promotion and relegation ===
The bottom team in the relegation play-out is relegated to the Campeonato Nacional de Rugby I Divisão, while the team that finishes 1st in the second tier of rugby union competitions in Portugal will replace the latter.

== Current Teams ==
Location of the teams competing in the 2025-26 Season.

=== Stadia and locations ===
Team	Manager	Captain	Stadium	Capacity
Académica	(South Africa) Lodie Van Staden	(Portugal) António Salgueiro	Estádio Municipal Sérgio Conceição	2500
Agronomia	(Portugal) Luís Pissarra	(Portugal) Francisco Cabral	Tapada da Ajuda	500
Belenenses	(Portugal) João Mirra	(Portugal) Tomás Sequeira	Belém Rugby Park	500
Benfica	(Portugal) Martim Aguiar	(Portugal) Tomás Picado	Lisbon University Stadium	1500
Cascais	(Argentina) Gabriel Ascárate	(Portugal) António Vidinha	Estádio Municipal Dramático Cascais	1000
CDUL	(New Zealand) Kane Hancy	(Portugal) Tomás Appleton	Estádio Universitário de Lisboa	8000
CDUP	(Portugal) Francisco Vareta	(Portugal) Tomás Marrana	Estádio Universitário do Porto	1500
Direito	(Portugal) Bernardo Mota	(Portugal) Duarte Diniz	Complexo Desportivo Miguel Nobre Ferreira	2500
RC Montemor	(Portugal) João Baptista Malta		Parque Desportivo Municipal	500
RC Santarém				500
São Miguel	(Portugal) João Uva	(Fiji) Robert Delai	Bulldog Rugby Park	800
C. R. Técnico	(Portugal) António Manzoni de Sequeira	(Portugal) Rodrigo Bento	Campo das Olaias	800

== Champions ==
Season	Champion	Game	Second Place	Third Place	Fourth Place	1st before playoffs	Ref
1958/59	Belenenses #1						
1959/60	Benfica #1						
1960/61	Benfica #2						
1961/62	Benfica #3						
1962/63	Belenenses #2						
1963/64	CDUL #1		Belenenses				
1964/65	CDUL #2		Belenenses				
1965/66	CDUL #3		Académica				
1966/67	CDUL #4		Académica				
1967/68	CDUL #5		Benfica				
1968/69	CDUL #6		Académica				
1969/70	Benfica #4		Técnico				
1970/71	CDUL #7						
1971/72	CDUL #8						
1972/73	Belenenses #3						
1973/74	CDUL #9						
1974/75	Belenenses #4						
1975/76	Benfica #5						
1976/77	Académica #1						
1977/78	CDUL #10						
1978/79	Académica #2						
1979/80	CDUL #11		Benfica	Direito	Académica		
1980/81	Técnico #1		CDUL	Académica	CDUP		
1981/82	CDUL #12		Académica	Benfica	Direito		
1982/83	CDUL #13		Académica	Belenenses	Direito		
1983/84	CDUL #14						
1984/85	CDUL #15						
1985/86	Benfica #6						
1986/87	Cascais #1						
1987/88	Benfica #7						
1988/89	CDUL #16						
1989/90	CDUL #17						
1990/91	Benfica #8						
1991/92	Cascais #2						
1992/93	Cascais #3		Benfica	Belenenses	CDUL		
1993/94	Cascais #4		Direito	Benfica	CDUL		
1994/95	Cascais #5		Belenenses	Académica	CDUL		
1995/96	Cascais #6		CDUL	Belenenses	Lousã		
1996/97	Académica #3		Cascais	CDUL	Técnico		
1997/98	Técnico #2		Direito	Académica	Cascais		
1998/99	Direito #1		Académica	Técnico	CDUP		
1999/00	Direito #2		Agronomia	Técnico	CDUP		
2000/01	Benfica #9		Direito	Agronomia	Belenenses		
2001/02	Direito #3		CDUP	Benfica	Académica		
2002/03	Belenenses #5		Direito	CDUP	Agronomia		
2003/04	Académica #4		Agronomia	Direito	Belenenses		
2004/05	Direito #4		Agronomia	Belenenses	Benfica		
2005/06	Direito #5	22-06	Belenenses	Agronomia	Benfica	Belenenses	
2006/07	Agronomia #1	15-08	Direito	CDUL	CDUP	Agronomia	
2007/08	Belenenses #6	22-21	Agronomia	CDUL	Benfica	Agronomia	
2008/09	Direito #6	32-25	Agronomia	CDUL	Belenenses	Agronomia	
2009/10	Direito #7	22-12	Agronomia	CDUL	Belenenses	Agronomia	
2010/11	Direito #8	09-03	Belenenses	Agronomia	CDUL	CDUL	
2011/12	CDUL #18	23-15	Agronomia	Direito	Académica	CDUL	
2012/13	Direito #9	17-09	CDUL	Belenenses	Agronomia	CDUL	
2013/14	CDUL #19	19-15	Direito	Técnico	Belenenses	Direito	
2014/15	Direito #10	26-19	CDUL	Técnico	Agronomia	CDUL	
2015/16	Direito #11	11-06	CDUL	Cascais	Técnico	CDUL	
2016/17	CDUL #20	25-21	Agronomia	Direito	Cascais	Agronomia	
2017/18	Belenenses #7	17-09	Agronomia	Cascais	Direito	Agronomia	
2018/19	Agronomia #2	18-10	Belenenses	Técnico	CDUL	Belenenses	
2019/20	Cancelled due to the COVID-19 pandemic in Portugal					Belenenses	
2020/21	Técnico #3	15-11	Direito	Belenenses	CDUL	Direito	
2021/22	Belenenses #8	31-08	Direito	Cascais	CDUL	Belenenses	
2022/23	Direito #12	31-23	Cascais	Agronomia	Benfica	Cascais	
2023/24	Belenenses #9	19-18	Agronomia	Benfica	Direito	Belenenses	
2024/25	Belenenses #10		Cascais	Direito	São Miguel		
2025/26	Benfica #10		Cascais	Direito	CDUL		

Club	Titles	Years won
CDUL	20	1964, 1965, 1966, 1967, 1968, 1969, 1971, 1972, 1974, 1978, 1980, 1982, 1983, 1984, 1985, 1989, 1990, 2012, 2014, 2017
Direito	12	1999, 2000, 2002, 2005, 2006, 2009, 2010, 2011, 2013, 2015, 2016, 2023
Benfica	10	1960, 1961, 1962, 1970, 1976, 1986, 1988, 1991, 2001, 2026
Belenenses	10	1959, 1963, 1973, 1975, 2003, 2008, 2018, 2022, 2024, 2025
Cascais	6	1987, 1992, 1993, 1994, 1995, 1996
Académica	4	1977, 1979, 1997, 2004
Técnico	3	1981, 1998, 2021
Agronomia	2	2007, 2019

Head Coach	Years won
(Portugal) João Mirra	2018, 2022, 2024, 2025
(Portugal) João Paulo Bessa	1992, 1993, 1994, 1995
(Portugal) Frederico Sousa	2009, 2010, 2019
(Portugal) Martim Aguiar	2013, 2015, 2016
(Argentina) Daniel Hourcade	2005, 2006
(Portugal) Tomaz Morais	1999, 2000
(Portugal) António Aguilar	2026
(Argentina) Enrique Pichot	2023
(New Zealand) Kane Hancy	2021
(Australia) Jack Farrer	2017
(Australia) Damian Steele	2014
(Portugal) Luís Cassiano Neves	2012
(New Zealand) Aaron Jones	2011
(New Zealand) Bryce Bevin	2008
(Portugal) Ricardo Sequeira	2007
(Portugal) Rui Carvoeira	2004
(Spain) Marcelo Lavoine	2003
(Portugal) Dídio de Aguiar	2002
(Portugal) José Mendes da Silva	2001
(Portugal) José Paixão	1998
(Portugal) Sérgio Franco	1997
(Portugal) Nuno Durão	1996

== See also ==
- Campeonato Nacional de Rugby I Divisão
- Campeonato Nacional de Rugby II Divisão
- Taça de Portugal de Rugby
- Supertaça de Portugal de Rugby
- Copa Ibérica de Rugby/Taça Iberica de Rugby
- Rugby union in Portugal
