= Rugby Clube de Montemor =

Portuguese rugby union club, based in Montemor-o-Novo

RC Montemor
- Full name: Rugby Clube de Montemor
- Union: Portuguese Rugby Federation
- Founded: 20 July 1995 (31 years ago)
- Location: Montemor-o-Novo, Portugal
- Ground(s): Parque Desportivo, Montemor-o-Novo
- President: João Baptista Reis
- Coach: João Baptista Veiga Malta
- League: Campeonato Português de Rugby - Divisão de Honra
- 2018–19: Campeonato Nacional de Rugby I Divisão, winners (promoted)
1st kit	2nd kit

Official website
- www.rcmontemor.pt

Rugby Clube de Montemor is a rugby union team based in Montemor-o-Novo, Portugal. The team competes in the Campeonato Português de Rugby - Divisão de Honra, the first tier of rugby union in Portugal, having won the Campeonato Nacional de Rugby I Divisão in 2018/2019 and returned to the top flight following the 2023/2024 season.

Founded on 20 July 1995, Montemor is the most successful rugby club in Alentejo, with over 15 trophies in the last 20 years. Since 2007, their home ground has been the Parque Desportivo, Montemor-o-Novo.

== Honours ==
- Campeonato Nacional de Rugby I Divisão

Winners (4): 2012/2013, 2015/2016, 2018/2019, 2022/2023

- Campeonato Português de Rugby - Divisão de Honra Under-18

Winners: 2015/2016

- Portuguese Cup Under-18

Winners: 2014/2015

- Iberian Cup Under-18

Winners: 2016/2017

- Portuguese Super Cup Under-18

Winners: 2015/2016

== Competitive history ==
The following table summarises the recent record of Rugby Clube Montemor's senior team in Portuguese national competitions.

Season	Competition	Position / result	Notes
2024–25	Divisão de Honra	11th	Retained top-flight status
2023–24	Campeonato Nacional de Rugby I Divisão	2nd	Lost the final to Clube de Rugby do Técnico; promoted to the Divisão de Honra following a restructuring of the competition.
2022–23	Campeonato Nacional de Rugby I Divisão	Champions	Defeated Caldas Rugby Clube in the final. The club remained in the second tier following a decision by its board.
2021–22	Divisão de Honra	11th	Relegated following a restructuring of the championship, with two teams relegated
2020–21	Divisão de Honra	11th	—
2019–20	—	Season interrupted	Competitions affected by the COVID-19 pandemic
2018–19	Campeonato Nacional de Rugby I Divisão	Champions	Defeated Benfica in the final
2017–18	Divisão de Honra	9th	Relegated following a restructuring of the championship, with four teams relegated
2016–17	Divisão de Honra	9th	—
2015–16	Campeonato Nacional de Rugby I Divisão	Champions	—
2014–15	Divisão de Honra	10th	Relegated
2013–14	Divisão de Honra	10th	Retained top-flight status after Caldas Rugby Clube declined promotion
2012–13	Campeonato Nacional de Rugby I Divisão	Champions	—
2011–12	Campeonato Nacional de Rugby I Divisão	5th	—
2010–11	Campeonato Nacional de Rugby I Divisão	4th	—
2009–10	Campeonato Nacional de Rugby II Divisão	Champions	Defeated Caldas Rugby Clube in the final
2008–09	Campeonato Nacional de Rugby II Divisão	2nd	Lost to Rugby da Linha
2007–08	Campeonato Nacional de Rugby II Divisão	3rd	—
2006–07	Campeonato Nacional de Rugby II Divisão	3rd	—
2005–06	Campeonato Nacional de Rugby II Divisão	2nd	—
2004–05	Campeonato Nacional de Rugby I Divisão	8th	Relegated
2003–04	Campeonato Nacional de Rugby I Divisão	5th	—
2002–03	Second Division	2nd	Championship restructuring, with an additional division introduced
2001–02	Second Division	6th	—
2000–01	Second Division	2nd	—
