= Clube de Rugby de Arcos de Valdevez =

Portuguese rugby union club

CRAV
- Full name: Clube de Rugby de Arcos de Valdevez
- Founded: 1981; 44 years ago
- Ground: Municipal de Arcos de Valdevez
- Chairman: (Portugal) Filipe Machado
- Coach: (Portugal) Nuno Vaz
- League: Campeonato Nacional Honra/Super Bock
- 2012–13: 9th
1st kit	2nd kit

Clube de Rugby de Arcos de Valdevez (CRAV) is a rugby union club located in Arcos de Valdevez, Portugal. The men's team plays at the Campeonato Nacional Honra/Super Bock, Portugal's top level rugby union championship. The club also features women, youth and veteran teams and a B team that plays in Campeonato Nacional de Rugby II Divisão, Portuguese third division.

The club organises the international rugby sevens tournament Arcos Sevens.

== History ==
The club was founded on 1981-07-09 by a group of former students of University of Porto and University of Coimbra, where they had also played. Shortly after, in 1983, the club became champion of the Portuguese Third Division. Also in that year, the club started to have youth teams.

On 1986-05-01 the Coutada sports field was inaugurated, created exclusively for practising rugby.

In the season of 1986–87, CRAV promoted to Portugal top rugby union level league, Campeonato Nacional de Rugby, and have stayed on that level most of the seasons since then. In 2005, CRAV eventually played, and lost, the championship finals to Dramático de Cascais.

In 2006, the municipal stadium of Arcos de Valdevez was inaugurated. In 2007, the juvenile team became national champion of Rugby of 8; also the women's team reached the top national level.

In 2012, CRAV returned to the Portuguese top division, after the Portuguese Rugby Federation increased the number of teams in the Campeonato Nacional Honra/Super Bock to 10.
