= S.L. Benfica (rugby union) =

Portuguese rugby union team

Benfica
- Union: Portuguese Rugby Federation
- Founded: 4 October 1924 (102 years ago)
- Location: Lisbon, Portugal
- Ground: Lisbon University Stadium
- Coach: António Aguilar Francisco Fernandes
- League: Campeonato Português de Rugby
- 2025–26: Champions
Team kit

Official website
- www.slbenfica.pt/pt-pt/modalidades/rugby

Sport Lisboa e Benfica (Portuguese pronunciation: [sɨˈpɔɾ liʒˈβoɐ i βɐ̃jˈfikɐ]), commonly known as Benfica, is a Portuguese rugby union team based in Lisbon. Founded in 1924, Benfica is one of the oldest Portuguese rugby teams. The men's team competes in the Campeonato Português de Rugby, the first tier of rugby union in Portugal. In June 2014, the club refused the invitation to join the first division. The women's team play in the Campeonato Nacional, the first tier, but recent changes in the competition mean they only compete in Sevens.

== Honours ==
According to Benfica's official website

=== Men's ===
- Iberian Cup

Winners (4): 1970, 1986, 1988, 2001

- Portuguese Championship

Winners (10): 1959–60, 1960–61, 1961–62, 1969–70, 1975–76, 1985–86, 1987–88, 1990–91, 2000–01, 2025-26

- Portuguese Cup

Winners (9): 1961, 1965, 1966, 1970, 1972, 1975, 1983, 1984, 1985

- Campeonato Regional de Lisboa

Winners (12): 1931, 1936, 1937, 1939, 1942, 1947, 1948, 1949, 1950, 1951, 1954, 1955

- Taça de Honra da FPR

Winners (3): 1949, 1950, 1966

=== Women's ===
- Campeonato Nacional

Winners (7): 2006–07, 2007–08, 2008–09, 2010–11, 2012–13, 2017-18, 2023–24

- Taça de Portugal

Winners (8): 2005, 2008, 2009, 2010, 2011, 2012, 2014, 2016

- Supertaça

Winner (8): 2007, 2008, 2009, 2010, 2011, 2012, 2013, 2016

- Campeonato Nacional de Sevens

Winners (8): 2009–10, 2012–13, 2013–14, 2014–15, 2015–16, 2023-24, 2024-25, 2025-26

- Taça de Portugal de Sevens

Winners (2): 2013-14, 2015-16

== Current squad ==
Information based on Portuguese Rugby Federation

The Benfica squad for the 2026–27 Super XV season
**Props**: (Canada) **Samuel Miller**; (Colombia) **David Henao**; (Samoa) **Brook To'omalatai**; (Argentina) Cristian Antoncic; (Portugal) José Maria Pereira; (Portugal) Serafim Djassi; (Portugal) Gonçalo Jorge; **Hookers**: (South Africa) Jason Cornelius^{*}^{LUS}; (Portugal) Isaías Camará; (Portugal) Pedro Gouveia; **Locks**: (Portugal) **Francisco Almeida**^{LUS}; (Italy) Giuseppe Piacenza; (South Africa) Simão Dionísio^{*}; (Portugal) Eurico Chichorro; (Portugal) Afonso Boavida; (Portugal) Vicente Quaresma	**Backrow**: (Portugal) **Frederico Couto**^{LUS}; (Portugal) **Manuel Fati**^{LUS}; (Argentina) Omar Gutiérrez; (Portugal) Tomás Picado (c); (Portugal) Pedro Ismael Tavares; (Portugal) Rui Duarte; (Portugal) João Ferreira; (Brazil) Caio Almeida; **Scrum-halves**: (Portugal) **António Campos**^{LUS}; (Ireland) Elliott Ryan^{*}; **Fly-halves**: (Portugal) **João Lima**; (Luxembourg) **Fintan Lawlor**; (Argentina) Ramiro Pérez Gutiérrez	**Three-quarters**: (Portugal) **José Lima**^{LUS}; (Portugal) **Guilherme Vasconcelos**^{LUS}; (Argentina) Juan Pablo Castro; (Argentina) Leopoldo Herrera; (New Zealand) Hayden Hann^{*}; (Guinea-Bissau) Felisbelo Vieira^{*}; (Portugal) Edgar Monteiro; (Portugal) Diego Caeiro; (Portugal) Rodrigo Sampaio; (Portugal) Zé Miguel Carvalho; **Fullbacks**: (Portugal) **José Rodrigues**; (Portugal) António Alves
(c) denotes the team captain, **Bold** denotes internationally capped players. ^{LUS} denotes Lusitanos capped players.^{*} denotes players qualified to play for Portugal on residency or dual nationality.

== Previous squads ==
According to Portuguese Rugby Federation

The Benfica squad for the 2025–26 Campeonato Nacional de Rugby season
**Props**: (Canada) **Samuel Miller**; (Colombia) **Juan David Henao**; (Uruguay) **Santiago Cagnone**; (England) Oliver Adkins; (Portugal) José Maria Pereira; (Portugal) Serafim Djassi; (Portugal) Gonçalo Jorge; (Portugal) Tomás Boavida; **Hookers**: (South Africa) Jason Cornelius^{LUS}; (Portugal) Pedro Gouveia; (Portugal) Eduardo Gomes; (Portugal) Isaías Camará; **Locks**: (Canada) Izzak Kelly; (Canada) **Karl Hunger**; (Italy) Giuseppe Piacenza; (Portugal) Eurico Chichorro; (Portugal) Afonso Boavida; (Portugal) Vicente Quaresma	**Backrow**: (Portugal) **Frederico Couto**^{LUS}; (Portugal) **Manuel Fati**^{LUS}; (Portugal) Frederico Silva; (Portugal) Tomás Picado; (Portugal) Pedro Ismael Tavares; (Portugal) Rui Duarte; (Portugal) João Ferreira; **Scrum-halves**: (Portugal) **António Campos**^{LUS}; (Ireland) Elliott Ryan; (Portugal) Luís Chança; **Fly-halves**: (Portugal) **João Lima**	**Three-quarters**: (Portugal) **José Lima**^{LUS}; (Portugal) **Guilherme Vasconcelos**^{LUS}; (Argentina) Juan Pablo Castro; (Argentina) Leopoldo Herrera; (New Zealand) Hayden Hann; (South Africa) Kyle Alves^{*}; (Portugal) Rodrigo Urzay Soares; (Portugal) Edgar Monteiro; (Portugal) Harrison Stock; (Portugal) Diego Caeiro; (Portugal) Francisco Costa; (Portugal) Rodrigo Sampaio; (Portugal) Zé Miguel Carvalho; (Guinea-Bissau) Felisbelo Vieira^{*}; **Fullbacks**: (Portugal) **José Rodrigues**; (Portugal) António Valadares; (Portugal) António Alves
(c) denotes the team captain, **Bold** denotes internationally capped players. ^{LUS} denotes Lusitanos capped players.^{*} denotes players qualified to play for Portugal on residency or dual nationality.
