= Copa Ibérica de Rugby =

- Founded: 1965
- Region: (Portugal) (Spain)
- Teams: 2
- Current champions: Belenenses (2nd title)
- Most championships: VRAC Quesos Entrepinares (8 titles)

The Copa Ibérica de Rugby (Iberian Rugby Cup) is a rugby union knock-out competition played annually by clubs of the Spanish Rugby Federation and Portuguese Rugby Federation. It was played for the first time in 1965.

Between 1965 and 1971, it was played by 4 clubs (2 of each country, both Champion's and both Runner's-up), that face each other in ligule type competition. The competition stopped being played in 1972, but returned in 1983 with a new format, with the 2 Champion's facing each other in just one game. In the season 2007–2008 it returned to the ligule type competition.

In 2009, a new competition named Iberian Rugby Cup was designed. This style of rugby was meant to be played with 8 teams, four of each federation, although it was suspended.

On 6 January 2013, CDUL defeated Quesos Entrepinares by 24–13, winning their 3rd title, in the return of the Copa Ibérica after a 5-year gap.

== Winners by year ==
Edition	Season	Date	Venue	Winner	Score	Runner-up
1st	1964/65	28-02-1965	(Community of Madrid) Estadio Nacional Complutense	(Spain) Canoe	12-9	(Portugal) CDUL
2nd	1965/66	19-02-1966	(Lisbon) Estádio Universitário de Lisboa	(Spain) Universitari	14-0	(Spain) Barcelona
3rd	1966/67	19-02-1967	(Catalonia) La Teixonera	(Spain) Canoe (2)	11-3	(Portugal) CDUL
4th	1967/68	03-03-1968	Estádio Universitário de Coimbra	(Spain) Cisneros	5-0	(Portugal) CDUL
5th	1968/69	16-02-1969	(Basque Country (autonomous community)) San Sebastián	(Spain) San Sebastián	3-3 (p.)	(Portugal) CDUL
6th	1969/70	01-03-1970	(Lisbon) Estádio Universitário de Lisboa	(Spain) Barcelona	12-8	(Spain) Cisneros
7th	1970/71	28-02-1971	(Community of Madrid) Estadio Nacional Complutense	(Portugal) Benfica	13-3	(Spain) Canoe
8th	1983/84	10-12-1983	(Valencian Community) Quatre Carreres	(Portugal) CDUL	13–3	(Spain) Valencia
9th	1984/85	08-12-1984	(Lisbon) Estádio Universitário de Lisboa	(Portugal) CDUL (2)	32–9	(Spain) Santboiana
10th	1985/86	14-12-1985	(Community of Madrid) Estadio Nacional Complutense	(Spain) Cisneros (2)	13–10	(Portugal) CDUL
11th	1986/87	06-12-1986	(Lisbon) Estádio Universitário de Lisboa	(Portugal) Benfica (2)	21–16	(Spain) Arquitectura
12th	1987/88	03-01-1988	(Catalonia) Estadi Baldiri Aleu	(Spain) Santboiana	23–16	(Portugal) Cascais
13th	1988/89	04-12-1988	(Lisbon) Estádio Universitário de Lisboa	(Portugal) Benfica (3)	25–4	(Spain) Arquitectura
14th	1989/90	09-12-1989	(Catalonia) Estadi Baldiri Aleu	(Spain) Santboiana (2)	13–6	(Portugal) CDUL
15th	1990/91	08-12-1990	(Lisbon) Estádio Universitário de Lisboa	(Spain) Arquitectura	25–16	(Portugal) CDUL
16th	1991/92	08-12-1991	(Castile and León) Estadio Pepe Rojo	(Spain) El Salvador	13–0	(Portugal) Benfica
17th	1992/93	06-12-1992	(Lisbon) Estádio Municipal Dramático Cascais	(Portugal) Cascais	12–11	(Spain) Ciencias
18th	1993/94	19-12-1993	(Basque Country (autonomous community)) Campos Deportivos de Fadura	(Portugal) Cascais (2)	21–19	(Spain) Getxo
19th	1994/95	08-12-1994	(Lisbon) Estádio Municipal Dramático Cascais	(Spain) Ciencias	31–14	(Portugal) Cascais
20th	1995/96	09-12-1995	(Community of Madrid) Estadio Nacional Complutense	(Spain) Arquitectura (2)	18–16	(Portugal) Cascais
21st	1996/97	28-12-1996	(Lisbon) Estádio Universitário de Lisboa	(Portugal) Cascais (3)	14–9	(Spain) Santboiana
22nd	1997/98	28-12-1997	(Catalonia) Estadi Baldiri Aleu	(Portugal) Académica	15–8	(Spain) Santboiana
23rd	1998/99	27-12-1998	(Lisbon) Campo das Olaias	(Spain) El Salvador (2)	29–15	(Portugal) Técnico
24th	1999/00	28-11-1999	(Castile and León) Estadio Pepe Rojo	(Portugal) Direito	20–16	(Spain) VRAC
25th	2000/01	09-12-2000	(Lisbon) Complexo Desportivo Miguel Nobre Ferreira	(Spain) Canoe (3)	26–11	(Portugal) Direito
26th	2001/02	29-12-2001	(Castile and León) Estadio Pepe Rojo	(Portugal) Benfica (4)	19–16	(Spain) VRAC
27th	2002/03	28-12-2002	(Lisbon) Complexo Desportivo Miguel Nobre Ferreira	(Portugal) Direito (2)	24–18	(Spain) Alcobendas
28th	2003/04	28-12-2003	(Castile and León) Estadio Pepe Rojo	(Spain) El Salvador (3)	40–34	(Portugal) Belenenses
29th	2004/05	04-06-2005	Estádio Universitário de Coimbra	(Spain) El Salvador (4)	32–0	(Portugal) Académica
30th	2005/06	26-11-2005	(Catalonia) Estadi Baldiri Aleu	(Spain) Santboiana (3)	20-26	(Portugal) Direito
31st	2006/07	16-12-2006	(Lisbon) Complexo Desportivo Miguel Nobre Ferreira	(Spain) Santboiana (4)	22-16	(Portugal) Direito
32nd	2007/08	05-01-2008	(Lisbon) Tapada da Ajuda	(Portugal) Agronomia	26–18	(Portugal) Direito
33rd	2012/13	06-01-2013	(Castile and León) Estadio Pepe Rojo	(Portugal) CDUL	24–13	(Spain) VRAC
34th	2013/14	28-12-2013	(Lisbon) Complexo Desportivo Miguel Nobre Ferreira	(Portugal) Direito (3)	41–11	(Spain) VRAC
35th	2014/15	28-12-2014	(Castile and León) Estadio Pepe Rojo	(Spain) VRAC (1)	32–8	(Portugal) CDUL
36th	2015/16	09-01-2016	(Lisbon) Complexo Desportivo Miguel Nobre Ferreira	(Portugal) Direito (4)	22–12	(Spain) VRAC
37th	2016/17	15-01-2017	(Castile and León) Estadio Pepe Rojo	(Spain) El Salvador (5)	27–22	(Portugal) Direito
38th	2017/18	23-12-2017	(Lisbon) Estádio Universitário de Lisboa	(Spain) VRAC (2)	27–13	(Portugal) CDUL
39th	2018/19	29-12-2018	(Castile and León) Estadio Pepe Rojo	(Spain) VRAC (3)	34–25	(Portugal) Belenenses
40th	2019/20	28-12-2019	(Lisbon) Tapada da Ajuda	(Spain) VRAC (4)	28–27	(Portugal) Agronomia
41st	2020/21	27-12-2020	(Castile and León) Estadio Pepe Rojo	(Spain) VRAC (5)	19–13	(Portugal) Belenenses
42nd	2021/22	03-04-2022	(Lisbon) Campo das Olaias	(Spain) VRAC (6)	44–8	(Portugal) Técnico
43rd	2022/23	26-03-2023	(Catalonia) Estadi Baldiri Aleu	(Portugal) Belenenses	45–15	(Spain) Santboiana
44th	2023/24	25-11-2023	(Lisbon) Complexo Desportivo Miguel Nobre Ferreira	(Spain) VRAC (7)	13–8	(Portugal) Direito
45th	2024/25	12-04-2025	(Castile and León) Estadio Pepe Rojo	(Spain) VRAC (8)	43–39 (OT)	(Portugal) Belenenses
46th	2025/26	11-01-2026	(Lisbon) Estádio do Restelo	(Portugal) Belenenses (2)	23–9	(Spain) El Salvador

=== Performance by club ===
Team	Title	Years Won	Federation
VRAC	8	2015, 2018, 2019, 2020, 2021, 2022, 2024, 2025	(Spain)
El Salvador	5	1992, 1999, 2004, 2005, 2017	(Spain)
Direito	4	2000, 2003, 2014, 2016	(Portugal)
Santboiana	4	1988, 1990, 2006, 2007	(Spain)
Benfica	4	1971, 1987, 1989, 2002	(Portugal)
CDUL	3	1984, 1985, 2013	(Portugal)
Pozuelo	3	1965, 1967, 2001	(Spain)
Cascais	3	1993, 1994, 1997	(Portugal)
Arquitectura	2	1991, 1996	(Spain)
Cisneros	2	1968, 1986	(Spain)
Belenenses	2	2023, 2026	(Portugal)
Agronomia	1	2008	(Portugal)
Académica	1	1998	(Portugal)
Ciencias	1	1995	(Spain)
Barcelona	1	1970	(Spain)
San Sebastián	1	1969	(Spain)
Universitari	1	1966	(Spain)

== Titles by country ==
Flag	Federation	Title count
(Spain)	Spain	28
(Portugal)	Portugal	18

== See also ==
- Rugby union in Portugal
- Rugby union in Spain
