= Braga Rugby =

Braga
- Full name: Braga Rugby
- Founded: November 2010
- Ground: Campo da Caseta
- President: Miguel Portela
- League: Campeonato Nacional de Rugby I Divisão
Team kit

Official website
- bragarugby.com

Braga Rugby is a rugby team based in Braga, Portugal. As of the 2018/19 season, they play in the Second Division of the Campeonato Nacional de Rugby (National Championship).

== History ==
The club was founded in November 2010 as the rugby section of the Centro Cultural e Social de Santo Adrião (Cultural and Social Center of Saint Adrian). The symbol of the club is a Gladiator helmet that reminds of the history of the city, once one of the most important cities in the Iberian Peninsula in Roman Empire. The players are also known as "Gladiadores" (Gladiators).

The club has mini, youth and senior level rugby as well as a feminine side, and most recently a veteran side with old players from the team and other players that live in the region, their first game was played in Santiago de Compostela, Spain, against a local veteran team.

The club organizes an international youth tournament that had its third edition in 2013, the "Braga Rugby Youth Cup". The tournament is open to the u-12, u-14 and u-16 club teams and regional federations.

Braga Rugby also organizes a beach rugby tournament in Ofir that had his second edition in 2013 and was included in the "Lusiaves Circuito Nacional de Beach Rugby Powered by MEO" (National Rugby Circuit), and was the last stage of it, crowning Tecnico in men sides and Sport Club do Porto in the feminine side. The tournament had u-14, u-18, seniors and feminine sides playing. The 2013 edition had a total of €750 in prize money.
