= AA UTAD Rugby =

Rugby team in Portugal

UTAD
- Full name: Associação Académica Universidade de Trás-os-Montes e Alto Douro Rugby
- Founded: 1984
- League: Campeonato Nacional de Rugby II Divisão
1st kit	2nd kit

AA UTAD Rugby is a rugby team based in Vila Real, Portugal. As of the 2012/13 season, they play in the Second Division of the Campeonato Nacional de Rugby (National Championship). The club is the official rugby team of the University of Trás-os-Montes and Alto Douro.

== History ==
The club was founded in 1984. They played their first match on 14 October of that year, winning 18–3 against GD Moitense (now Moita Rugby Clube da Bairrada).

== Honours ==
- Campeonato Nacional de Rugby II Divisão
  - 1998, 2001
