= Centro Desportivo Universitário de Lisboa =

Portuguese sports club based in Lisbon

CDUL
- Full name: Centro Desportivo Universitário de Lisboa
- Founded: 3 March 1952 (74 years ago)
- Ground: Estádio Universitário de Lisboa (Capacity: 8,000)
- Chairman: Francisco Figueiredo
- Coach: Julio Farias
- League: Campeonato Nacional Honra/Super Bock
- 2022–2023: Quarter-Finals & Cup Winners
| 1st kit | 2nd kit |

Centro Desportivo Universitário de Lisboa, or CDUL, is a Portuguese multisports club originally created for Lisbon's university students that evolved into a club for all ages, its prime sport being rugby. CDUL is the most decorated Portuguese rugby union team and was represented by four players at the 2007 Rugby World Cup finals. In 31/01/14 the senior rugby team won the 2014 main championship title after defeating GD Direito 19-15 While studying economics, the former Prime Minister and President of the Republic of Portugal Aníbal Cavaco Silva was an athlete of CDUL athletics department from 1958 to 1963.

On 6 January 2013, CDUL defeated Quesos Entrepinares by 24–13, winning their third Iberic Cup.

== Honors ==
- Campeonato Nacional Honra/Super Bock:
  - Winners (20): 1964, 1965, 1966, 1967, 1968, 1969, 1971, 1972, 1974, 1978, 1980, 1982, 1983, 1984, 1985, 1989, 1990, 2012, 2014, 2017
- Taça de Portugal de Rugby:
  - Winners (10): 1968, 1977, 1979, 1986, 1988, 1989, 2013, 2015, 2023, 2025
- Supertaça de Portugal de Rugby:
  - Winners (3): 1989, 1990, 2012
- Taça Ibérica:
  - Winners (3): 1984, 1985, 2012

According to Portuguese Rugby Federation

The CDUL squad for the 2023–24 TOP 10 season
| **Props**: (Brazil) **Matheus Rocha**; (Argentina) Cristian Zurita; (Portugal) Gonçalo Madaleno; (Portugal) José Almeida; (Portugal) Gonçalo Alves; (Portugal) Manuel Magriço; **Hookers**: (Portugal) **Duarte Foro**; (Portugal) Francisco Pedro; (Portugal) Isaías Camará; (Portugal) Samuel Marques; **Locks**: (Argentina) Gonzalo Aguiar; (Portugal) Francisco Almeida; (Portugal) António Stilwell; (Portugal) Diogo D'Almeida | **Backrow**: (Portugal) **Sebastião Villax**; (Portugal) **Xavier Cerejo**; (Portugal) **José Roque**; (Portugal) Manuel Fati; (Portugal) Eduardo Queiroz; (Portugal) Rodrigo Oliveira; (Portugal) Francisco Figueiredo; (Portugal) José Libano Monteiro; **Scrum-halves**: (Portugal) **Francisco Magalhães**; (France) Reymond Dorian; (Portugal) Martim Domingues; **Fly-halves**: (Portugal) **Jorge Abecasis**; (Portugal) **Nuno Penha Costa**; (Portugal) Pedro Neiva; (Portugal) Pedro Anahory; (Portugal) Lourenço Cardoso; (Portugal) Faustino Gama | **Centres**: (Portugal) **Tomás Appleton**; (Portugal) **Francisco Appleton**; (Argentina) Ignacio Albornoz; (Portugal) Nuno Macedo; (Portugal) Bernardo Matos; (Portugal) Guilherme Vasconcelos; (Portugal) Martim Faro; (Portugal) Francisco Teiga Vieira; (Portugal) Afonso Alvarez; **Wingers**: (Portugal) **Fabio Conceiçao**; (Portugal) **Tomás Noronha**; (Portugal) Bernardo Canas; (Portugal) Hussein Sacoor; (Portugal) Tomás Passaro; (Portugal) João Cardoso; **Fullbacks**: (New Zealand) Sam Aitken; (Portugal) Manuel Salgado; (Portugal) Diogo Cardoso; (Portugal) Sebastião Stilwell |
(c) denotes the team captain, **Bold** denotes internationally capped players.^{*} denotes players qualified to play for Portugal on residency or dual nationality.

== History ==
| Season | Manager | Championship | Cup | Super Cup | Iberian Cup |
|---|---|---|---|---|---|
| 2007/08 | (Portugal) Salvador Amaral | 3rd | QF | | |
| 2008/09 | (New Zealand) Craig Sandland | 3rd | SF | | |
| 2009/10 | (New Zealand) Craig Sandland | 3rd | RU | | |
| 2010/11 | (Portugal) Pedro Melo e Castro | 4th | SF | | |
| 2011/12 | (Portugal) Luís Cassano Neves | CH | QF | | |
| 2012/13 | (Portugal) Manuel Sommer Ribeiro | RU | CH | CH | CH |
| 2013/14 | (Australia) Damian Steele | CH | RU | RU | |
| 2014/15 | (Australia) Damian Steele | RU | CH | RU | RU |
| 2015/16 | (Australia) Damian Steele | RU | SF | RU | |
| 2016/17 | (Australia) Jack Farrer | CH | R16 | | |
| 2017/18 | (Portugal) João Pedro Varela | 5th | QF | RU | RU |
| 2018/19 | (Portugal) João Pedro Varela | 4th | SF | | |
| 2019/20 | (Portugal) Gonçalo Foro | cancelled | cancelled | | |
| 2020/21 | (Portugal) Gonçalo Foro | 4th | SF | | |
| 2021/22 | (Portugal) Gonçalo Foro | 4th | R16 | | |
| 2022/23 | (Argentina) Julio Farías | 6th | CH | | |
| 2023/24 | (Argentina) Julio Farías | 6th | QF | RU | |
| 2024/25 | (New Zealand) Kane Hancy | 5th | CH | | |
