= Bader Pretorius =

South African rugby union player

- Full name: Bader-Werner Pretorius
- Born: 16 May 1997 (age 29) Johannesburg, South Africa
- Height: 1.80 m (5 ft 11 in)
- Weight: 90 kg (200 lb)
- School: Michaelhouse

Rugby union career
- Position: Fly-half
- Current team: São Miguel RC
Youth career
- 2010: Western Province
- 2013–2015: Sharks
- 2016–2018: Golden Lions
Senior career
Years	Team	Apps	(Points)
2019–2020	Southern Kings	12	(33)
2020-2023	Jersey Reds	5	(76)
2020-2021	Chinnor RFC	3	(7)
2023-	São Miguel RC		
- Correct as of 15 May 2026
International career
Years	Team	Apps	(Points)
2015	South Africa Schools 'A'	3	(19)
2025-	Germany	5	(19)
- Correct as of 15 May 2026

Bader-Werner Pretorius (born 16 May 1997) is a German, South African-born rugby union player who currently plays for São Miguel RC in the Campeonato Nacional de Rugby league. His regular position is fly-half.

Pretorius was born in Johannesburg. He went to Michaelhouse boarding school in South Africa where he played for the schools first team for 2 years and captained the 2015 side that went on to finish the season unbeaten. He represented Western Province and the Sharks at school level and played for the South Africa Schools 'A' team in the Under-18 International Series in 2015. Bader has also represented Germany at Senior level.

== Club Career ==
=== Golden Lions ===
After school, Pretorius joined the Golden Lions academy, playing for them at Under-19 and Under-21 level between 2016 and 2018. He was released by the Golden Lions at the end of 2018, and joined Pro14 side the Southern Kings.

=== Southern Kings ===
Bader made his first class debut for the Southern Kings in their match against Edinburgh, scoring a try seven minutes after coming on as a replacement in a 25–21 victory.

Following the disbandment of Southern Kings, Pretorius signed for RFU Championship side Jersey Reds ahead of the 2020–21 season.

=== Jersey Reds ===
Bader featured for the Jersey Reds during the delayed 2021 Championship season, making a number of appearances and scoring a try against Hartpury University.

=== Chinnor ===
Following his spell with Jersey Reds, Pretorius spent time with English National League side Chinnor R.F.C., making appearances during the 2021–22 season.

=== Rugby São Miguel ===
Pretorius later moved to Portugal to join São Miguel RC, where he has played primarily as a fly-half. He has been a regular member of the squad in domestic and European competition and remained with the club into the mid-2020s.

== International career ==
=== Germany ===
Eligible for Germany through his parentage, Pretorius represented the Germany national rugby union team in the Rugby Europe Championship. He featured during the 2025 competition, appearing in matches against Portugal and Switzerland and contributing points through his kicking game.
