= Caldas Rugby Clube =

Rugby team in Portugal

Caldas
- Full name: Caldas Rugby Clube
- Ground(s): Campo de Rugby Complexo Desportivo Avenida Dobrynine, Caldas da Rainha
- Coach: [[]]
- League: Campeonato Nacional de Rugby I Divisão
Team kit

Caldas Rugby Clube is a rugby team based in Caldas da Rainha, Portugal. As of the 2012/13 season, they play in the First Division of the Campeonato Nacional de Rugby (National Championship).

== Stadium ==
Complexo Desportivo Das Caldas da Rainha

== Team ==
- 1.Ricardo Correia
- 2.Tomás Cambournac
- 3.Marcos Pedregal
- 4.José Contreras(C)
- 5.Wilson Bento
- 6.Leonardo Ferreira
- 7.Augusto Andrade
- 8.Filipe Gil
- 9.Lautaro Vaca
- 10.Ruan Botha
- 11.Diogo Vasconcelos
- 12.Tomás Jacinto
- 13.Diogo Silva
- 14.Àlvaro Peña
- 15.Corrado Berti
- -
- 16.Alexis Scotto
- 17.Luis Ravina
- 18.David Esteves
- 19.Rafael Cavaco
- 20.Pedro Arruda
- 21.André Filipe
- 22.Weber Nunes
- 23.António Pardal
- 24.Afonso Oliveira
- 25.João Carlos

Head Coach-Brendon Snyman

== Lendas ==
- Pedro Madaleno
- Nelson Madaleno
- Luis Lalanda
- Luis Gaspar
- João Maia
- Paulo Cunha
- Paulo Santos
- Fernando Silva
- Daniel Pedro
- Pedro Leite
- Bruno Silva
- Salvador Carvalho
- Francisco Calado
- Henrique Frasão
- Filipe Vieirinha
- Dario Vieirinha
- Nuno Berjano
- António Vidigal
- João Vidigal
- Eduardo Pecegueiro
- Óscar Carvalho
- Rafael Lusio
- Pedro Gomes

== U16 CRC ==
- Alexandre Vinagre
- Arthur Auwerkerken
- Bernardo Carvalho
- Bruno Nascimento
- Diogo Heitor
- Eden Luxemborg
- Francisco Madaleno
- Francisco Fardilha
- Giorgi Lamazoshvili
- João Duarte Carvalho
- Manuel Madaleno
- Miguel Carvalho
- Rodrigo Bastos
- Sacha Teeuw

U14

- Lourenço Carvalho
