= Rugby Clube de Loulé =

Portuguese rugby union club, based in Loulé

Loulé
- Full name: Rugby Clube de Loulé
- Ground(s): Parque Municipal, Loulé
- President: José Moura
- League: Campeonato Nacional de Rugby II Divisão
Team kit

Rugby Clube de Loulé is a rugby union team based in Loulé, Portugal. As of the 2012/13 season, they play in the First Division of the Campeonato Nacional de Rugby (National Championship).

== Staff ==
- Head coach: André Gomes
- Assistant coach: Rui Mendonça
- Assistant coach: João Matos

Lima

- Assistant coach: Nuno Otão
- Physiotherapist:
