= Clube de Rugby de Évora =

Portuguese rugby team

C.R.Évora
- Full name: Clube de Rugby de Évora
- Founded: 1992
- Ground(s): Complexo Desportivo de Évora (Capacity: 180 Pessoas)
- President: Carlos Santana
- Coach(es): Cristian Zurita, Diogo Pinheiro
- League(s): Primeiro Escalão Sénior
Team kit

Clube de Rugby de Évora is a rugby union team based in Évora, Portugal. In the 2016/17 season, they played in the First Division of the Campeonato Português de Rugby. (National Championship).
