= Moita Rugby Clube da Bairrada =

- Full name: Moita Rugby Clube da Bairrada
- League: Campeonato Nacional de Rugby I Divisão
Team kit

Moita Rugby Clube da Bairrada is a rugby team based in Anadia, Portugal. As of the 2012/13 season, they play in the Second Division of the Campeonato Nacional de Rugby.
