= Tomás Appleton =

Portuguese rugby union player

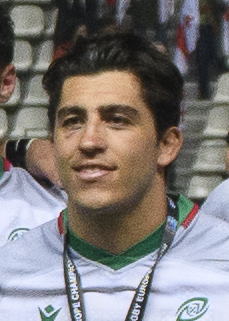
- Full name: Tomás Mourato Vermelho Mega Appleton
- Born: 29 July 1993 (age 33) Lisbon, Portugal
- Height: 1.82 m (6 ft 0 in)
- Weight: 95 kg (209 lb; 14 st 13 lb)

Rugby union career
- Position(s): Centre, Fly-half
- Current team: CDUL, Lusitanos XV
Senior career
Years	Team	Apps	(Points)
2010–	CDUL		
2015–2016	Darlington Mowden Park	17	(13)
2021–	Lusitanos XV	10	(10)
- Correct as of 4 August 2023
International career
Years	Team	Apps	(Points)
2013	Portugal U20	2	(0)
2014–	Portugal	74	(80)
- Correct as of 4 August 2023
National sevens team
Years	Team		Comps
2014–2019	Portugal		20
- Correct as of 4 August 2023

Tomás Mourato Vermelho Mega Appleton (born 29 July 1993) is a Portuguese semi-professional rugby union player who plays as a centre for Lusitanos XV and captains the Portugal national team. He is also a qualified and practising dentist.

== Club career ==
He has played for CDUL since he was 6 years old, and was promoted to the first team in 2011/12. He won the Campeonato Português de Rugby with them in 2011/12, 2013/14 and 2016/17. He spent a season in England at Darlington Mowden Park, in National League One in 2015/16, returning to CDUL afterwards.

== International career ==
He has won 48 caps for Portugal, scoring 10 tries, 50 points on aggregate. He won his first cap at the 29–20 victory over Namibia, on 22 November 2014, in Lisbon. He has been a regular player for the "Lobos" ever since then. He played in the 2019 Rugby World Cup qualification tournament. He is currently the captain of the national team.
