= Francisco Cabral =

Francisco Cabral may refer to:

- Francisco Cabral (Jesuit)
- Francisco Cabral (tennis)
