= Clube Rugby São Miguel =

São Miguel
- Full name: Clube Rugby São Miguel
- Nickname: Buldogues (Bulldogs)
- Founded: 31 March 1970 (56 years ago)
- Ground: Bulldog Stadium
- President: Miguel Texeira
- Coach: Rui Carvoeira
- League: Campeonato Nacional de Rugby I Divisão
Team kit

Clube Rugby São Miguel is a rugby team based in the neighbourhood of São Miguel in Lisbon, Portugal. As of the 2012/13 season, they play in the Second Division of the Campeonato Nacional de Rugby (National Championship).

== History ==
The club was founded in 1970. After a gap in activity the club returned to activity in 2009 following a large meeting of former players and families to celebrate the 40th anniversary of Afonso Costa Pereira.

In 2010 the club returned to competition with the senior team playing the II Division of the Portuguese Championship. In 2012-2013 the team finished 2nd and was promoted to the 1st Division. In 2017/2018 the senior team reached the final and almost got promoted to Honor Division however they lost against CRAV.

== Current squad ==
Information based on Portuguese Rugby Federation

The São Miguel squad for the 2026–27 Super XV season
| **Props**: (Zimbabwe) **Stanley Muranganwa**; (Argentina) Ramiro Pennella; (Argentina) Alexander Arroyo; (Argentina) Mateo Suarez; (Portugal) Afonso Loureiro; (Portugal) Pedro Botelho; **Hookers**: (Brazil) **Henrique Ferreira**; (Argentina) Thomas Goyochea; (Portugal) Junior Mendes; (Portugal) Emilio Venceslau Banaru; **Locks**: (Brazil) **Felipe Rosa**; (Argentina) Nicolas Bertoldi; (Argentina) Gonzalo Aguiar; (Portugal) Pedro Oliveira; (Portugal) Duarte Carolino | **Backrow**: (South Africa) Sabata Mokhachane^{*}^{LUS}; (Argentina) Tomás Bujazha; (New Zealand) Ronan Dynes; (New Zealand) Leslie Hills; (Portugal) Miguel Orrico; (Portugal) Sebastião Coelho; (Portugal) Francisco Conde; **Scrum-halves**: (Italy) Niccolo Cristofaro; **Fly-halves**: (Germany) **Bader Pretorius (c)**; (Netherlands) **Kai Van Kampen**; (Spain) Gael Garcia; (Portugal) Francisco Teixeira | **Three-quarters**: (Brazil) **Robson Morais**; (Australia) Oliver Arcus; (Italy) Luca Pagnani; (France) Evrard Blain; (Portugal) Francisco Cardoso; (Portugal) João Ruivo; (Portugal) Duarte Branquinho; (Portugal) Rafael Ferreira; **Fullbacks**: (Italy) Andrea Ragno^{*}; (Portugal) Tiago Girão |
(c) denotes the team captain, **Bold** denotes internationally capped players. ^{LUS} denotes Lusitanos capped players.^{*} denotes players qualified to play for Portugal on residency or dual nationality.

== Previous squads ==
According to Portuguese Rugby Federation

The São Miguel squad for the 2025–26 Campeonato Nacional de Rugby season
| **Props**: (Fiji) **Robert Delai**; (Argentina) Matias Bueso; (Argentina) Ramiro Pennella; (Argentina) Alexander Arroyo; (Portugal) Tiago Quitério; (Portugal) Afonso Loureiro; (Portugal) Tomas Fernandes Campos; **Hookers**: (England) Jake Pope; (Argentina) Thomas Goyochea; **Locks**: (Brazil) **Felipe Rosa**; (Argentina) Nicolas Bertoldi; (Portugal) Pedro Oliveira; (Portugal) Vicente Trancoso; (Portugal) Duarte Carolino | **Backrow**: (South Africa) Sabata Mokhachane^{*}^{LUS}; (England) Joseph Duffy; (Portugal) Miguel Orrico; (Portugal) Sebastião Petronilho; (Portugal) Sebastião Coelho; (Portugal) Bernardo Carrelo; **Scrum-halves**: (Portugal) João Bandeira; (Portugal) Tomás Trincheiras; **Fly-halves**: (Germany) Bader Pretorius (c); (Argentina) Agustin Altamirano; (Portugal) Francisco Teixeira; (Portugal) Tomás Aquino | **Three-quarters**: (Argentina) Nacho Huaier de la Vega; (Zimbabwe) Bright Matimba; (South Africa) Allistair Mumba; (France) Evrard Blain; (Portugal) José Pena Monteiro; (Portugal) João Tavares; (Portugal) Duarte Branquinho; (Portugal) Ricardo Rosa; (Portugal) Leandro Ceita; (Portugal) Francisco Cardoso; (Portugal) João Ruivo; (Portugal) Jorge Anjinho; (Portugal) Rafael Ferreira; **Fullbacks**: (Italy) Andrea Ragno^{*}; (Portugal) Miguel Martins; (Portugal) Tiago Girão |
(c) denotes the team captain, **Bold** denotes internationally capped players. ^{LUS} denotes Lusitanos capped players.^{*} denotes players qualified to play for Portugal on residency or dual nationality.

The São Miguel squad for the 2023–24 TOP 10 season
| **Props**: (Fiji) **Robert Delai**; (Argentina) José Santucho; (Argentina) Giovanni Ramallo; (South Africa) Juninho Patricio; (United States) Jayson Jackson; (Portugal) Tiago Quitério; **Hookers**: (Portugal) Miguel Seoane; (Portugal) Emilio Venceslau Banaru; **Locks**: (Portugal) Pedro Oliveira; (Portugal) Volodymyr Grikh; (Portugal) Francisco Silva; (Portugal) Simão Oliveira; (Portugal) Miguel Máximo; (Portugal) Simão Medeiro | **Backrow**: (South Africa) Sabata Mokhachane; (Portugal) Gonçalo Melo; (Portugal) Miguel Orrico; (Portugal) Tommy; (Portugal) Duarte Carolino; (Portugal) Diogo Pina; (Portugal) Rui Duarte; **Scrum-halves**: (Portugal) Tomás Trincheiras; (Portugal) Carlos; (Portugal) Mike; **Fly-halves**: (South Africa) Danny Mokhoabane; (Germany) Bader Pretorius; (Portugal) Francisco Teixeira | **Centres**: (South Africa) Charles Goedhals; (Portugal) Rivaldo Pinto; (Portugal) Tomás Morais; (Portugal) Lourenço Chambel; **Wingers**: (Zimbabwe) Bright Matimba; (Portugal) Ricardo Rosa; (Portugal) Francisco Cardoso; (Portugal) Francisco Reis; (Portugal) Tomás Aquino; **Fullbacks**: (Italy) Andrea Ragno; (Portugal) Duarte Branquinho; (Portugal) José Nascimento |
(c) denotes the team captain, **Bold** denotes internationally capped players.^{*} denotes players qualified to play for Portugal on residency or dual nationality.
