= Rugby union in Portugal =

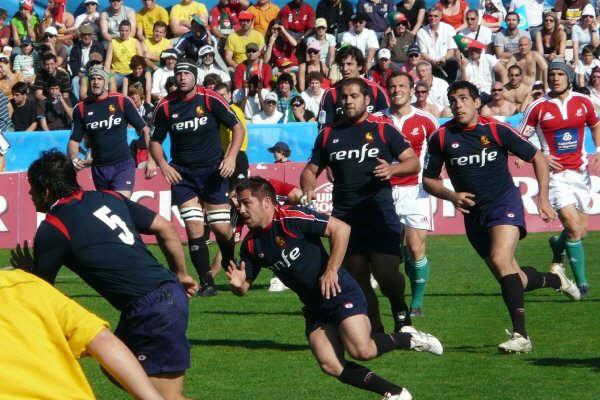
- Rugby match between Portugal and Spain
- Country: Portugal
- Governing body: Portuguese Rugby Federation
- National team: Portugal
- First played: 1903
- Registered players: 48000-60000

National competitions
- Rugby World Cup; Rugby World Cup Sevens; IRB Sevens World Series; European Nations Cup

Club competitions
- Campeonato Nacional Honra/Super Bock; Campeonato Nacional de Rugby I Divisão; Copa Ibérica de Rugby; European Challenge Cup; European Shield

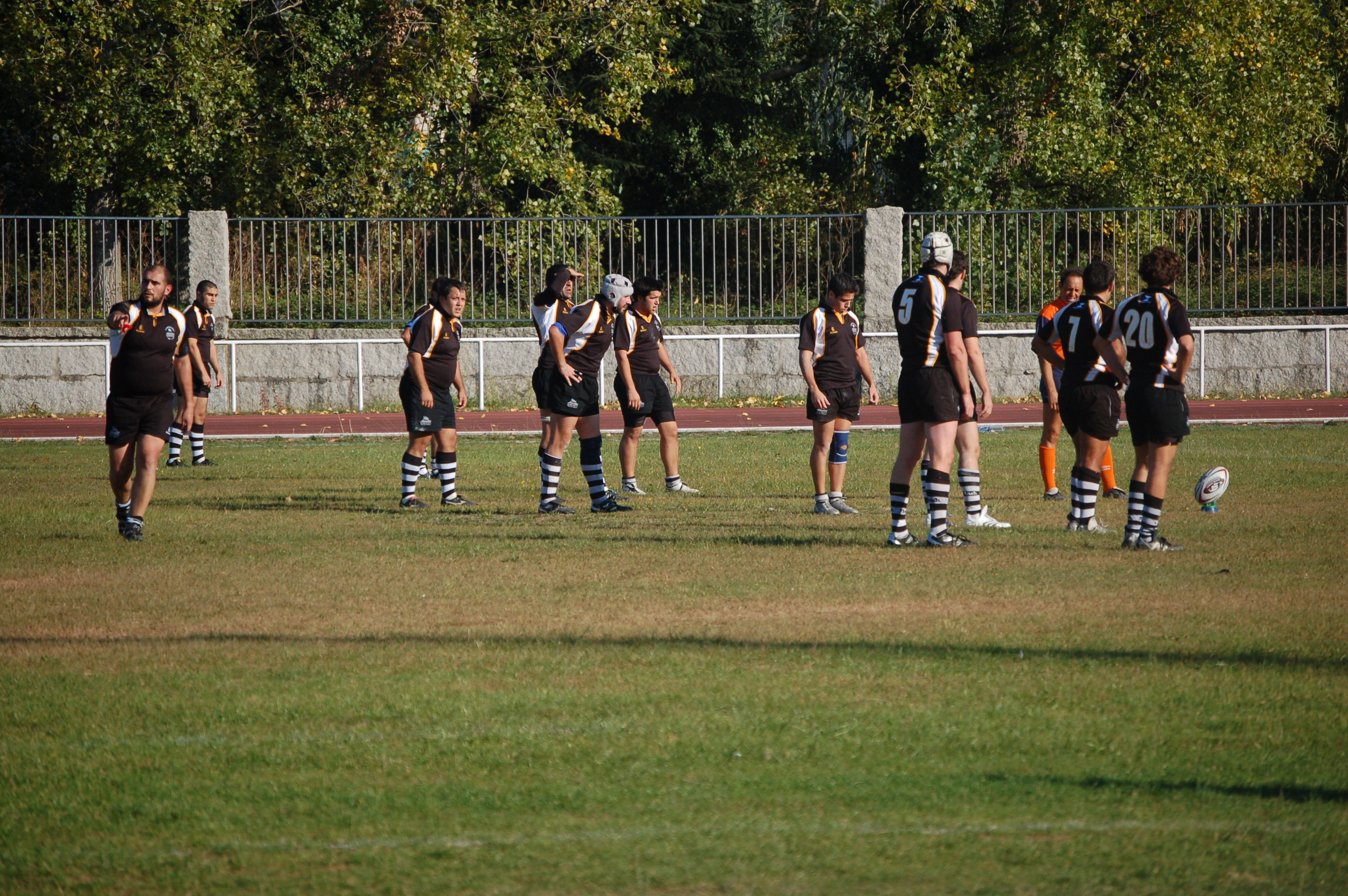
Players from Mareantes Rugby Clube before kickoff

Rugby union in Portugal is a very prevalent sport, though still a long distance from association football. The sport is essentially amateur in Portugal, with some professionalisation in its top flight league and the national rugby union team. The rugby union teams in Portugal are mostly university sides, from Lisbon, Porto and Coimbra, with multi-sport clubs like Benfica and Belenenses having rugby union collectivities.

== Governing body ==
Rugby union in Portugal is administered by the Federação Portuguesa de Rugby. It was founded in 1926 and became affiliated to the International Rugby Board in 1988.

== History ==
The first recorded game in Portugal occurred at Cruz Quebrada on the outskirts of Lisbon in 1903. All the players were British. However, it was only in the 1920s, and, later, in the 1950s that periods of consolidation occurred.

=== 1920s ===
In 1922 that the game began to be organized on a formal basis. The Anglo-Portuguese playing pool at this point had been severely depleted by the First World War, and the local population began to become involved. In many cases, the players were students, or ex-students, who had encountered the game abroad. The first match was played on 12 March, when a team from the Royal Football Club beat a team from Carcavelos. A second game was played in April, with the same result. Sporting recruited Maurice Baillehache, a Frenchman, as a player and coach. This led to a match between Sporting and the Royal Club on 11 November 1922, with Sporting emerging victorious. In 1927, the clubs of Benfica, the Royal Football Club, Carcavelinhos, Ginasio and Sporting came together to form the Portuguese Rugby Federation. A rugby football league was created in the same year, being won in that year by Sporting. Rugby arrived later in Porto, being played first at the Oporto Cricket and Lawn Tennis Club in 1908. The Oporto Rugby Club was founded in 1937. Lisbon first sent a team to play Porto in 1936.

=== 1950s ===
Portuguese rugby had once again been set back by the effects of another world war, but it was still dominated by students and ex-students.

Portuguese rugby was heavily influenced by French rugby in this period.

=== 1990s ===
Portuguese rugby had a much needed "facelift" in this period, with some of its various problems being addressed. The shortage of facilities was partly remedied, and a proper youth recruitment programme put in place. In three years during the mid-1990s, Portugal managed to double its number of registered players from around 3,000 to around 6,000

In 1995, however, Portugal had a major setback when they were beaten at home 102-11 by Wales in the 1995 Rugby World Cup qualifiers. This set their morale back, and led to criticism of weaknesses in scrummaging, rucking and mauling.

=== Present day ===
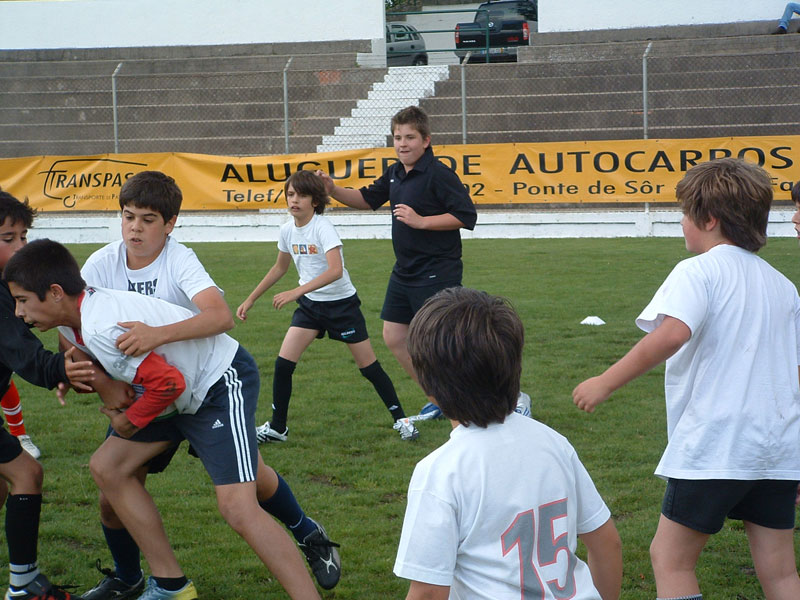
Schools development rugby

Portuguese rugby continues to hover around the 50,000 mark, but the main aim at the moment is to improve the national infrastructure, which has partly paid off, since the Portuguese rugby team managed to get into the 2007 Rugby World Cup - the first all amateur team to do so since professionalization. They were the only new team in the tournament since all the rest had appeared in the 2003 Rugby World Cup, and they got there by knocking out Uruguay.

In 2008 the Portuguese Rugby Federation, the Spanish Rugby Federation, the Gibraltar rugby authority and various clubs agreed to the formation of a Liga Superibérica (Super Iberian League), which will operate on a franchise system (similar to rugby league's Super League or Japan's bj league of basketball). The new league shall operate with 5 Spanish clubs, 4 Portuguese, and one from Gibraltar. It will operate on a different season from the main leagues.

Because Portugal is a popular holiday destination for people from the United Kingdom and Ireland, with reasonably priced flights etc., it has emerged as a popular tour destination.

Since 2023, after an upset win over Fiji in the 2023 Rugby World Cup, Portuguese rugby has become far more widespread and popular throughout the country.

== Competitions ==
=== Current hierarchical divisional breakdowns ===
- Campeonato Português de Rugby (12 teams)
- Campeonato Nacional de Rugby I Divisão (10 teams)
- Campeonato Nacional de Rugby II Divisão (2 groups of 8 teams each)

== National team ==
The national rugby union team made a dramatic qualification into the 2007 Rugby World Cup and become the first all amateur team to qualify for the World Cup since the sport opened itself up to professionals in August 1995 (after that year's World Cup). They qualified for the 2023 Rugby World Cup by winning the Final Qualification Tournament. Samuel Marques kicked an overtime penalty that would see "Os Lobos" win that qualification group on points difference. The Portuguese national rugby sevens team has performed well, becoming one of the strongest teams in Europe, and proved their status as European champions in several occasions.

The Portugal national rugby union team, nicknamed "Os Lobos," Portuguese for "The Wolves", is a second tier rugby union side representing Portugal. They first played in 1935 and now compete in the European Nations Cup. Portugal qualified for their first Rugby World Cup in 2007. Portugal were in Pool C along with the New Zealand, Italy, Romania and Scotland. In the tournament, open side João Uva and outside half Duarte Cardoso Pinto were noted as particularly outstanding players. They were heavily beaten by New Zealand but gave both Italy and Romania serious matches with Romania being held to a 14-10 victory, only through their muscle and the second half appearance of skilled Romanian hooker Marius Țincu.

Portugal have experienced unprecedented success in recent years. They were surprise winners of the 2003-4 European Nations Cup and have continued to record impressive results as they have now officially qualified for the 2023 Rugby World Cup after winning the Repechage Tournament for the final spot in the competition, beating teams such as Spain, Russia, Romania, Hong Kong and drawing with Georgia and The United States in the process. Portugal is in pool C and will play Wales, Australia, Fiji and Georgia.

=== Sevens ===
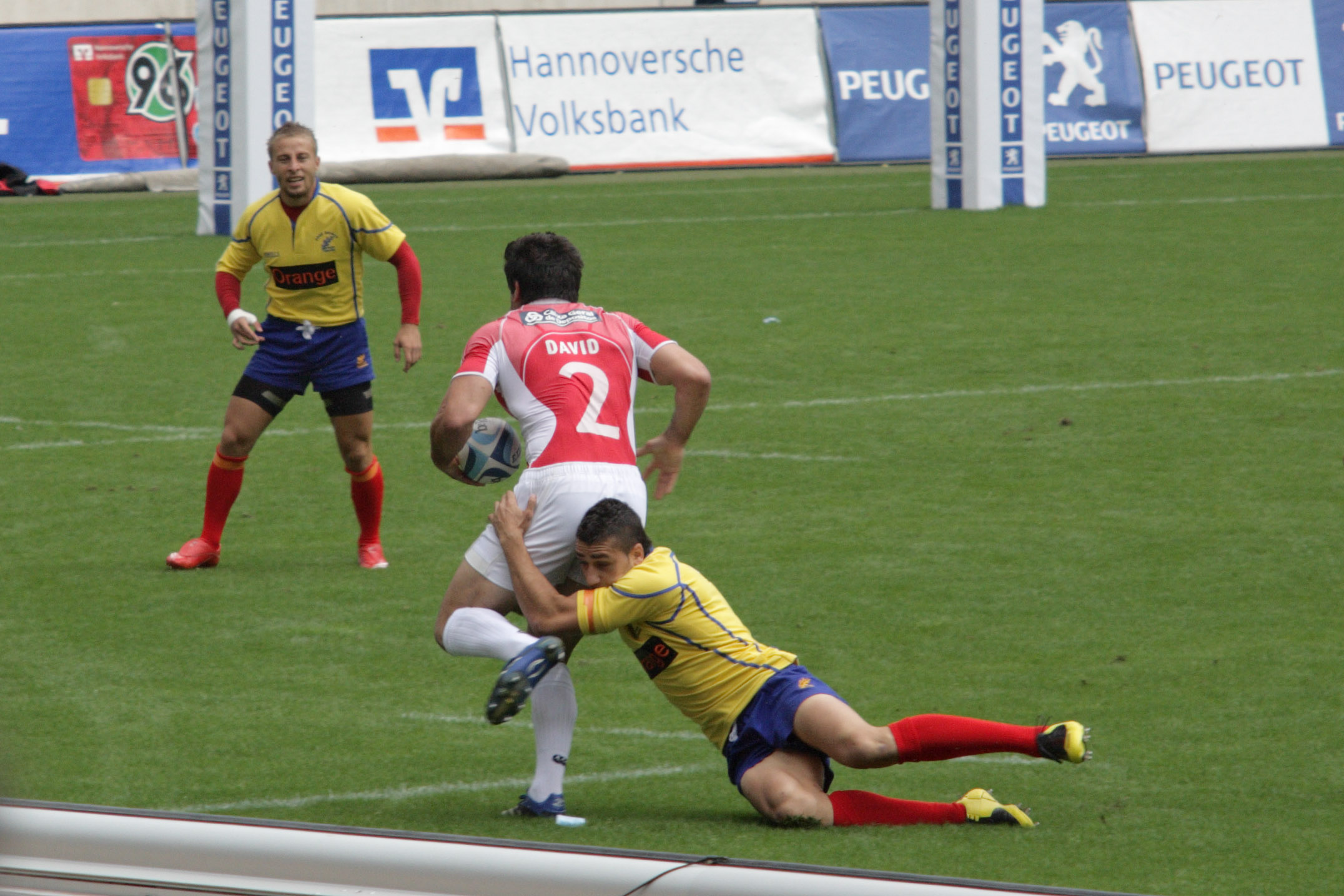
Portugal playing Romania, 2008

The Portugal national rugby sevens team represent Portugal in international rugby sevens. The team compete in competitions such as the World Sevens Series and the Rugby World Cup Sevens. Pedro Leal and Pedro Cabral are two notable sevens players.

The IRB Sevens World Series circuit has allowed the Portuguese players to demonstrate their competence to the wider rugby world. In 2006-07 Portugal was an IRB Sevens "core team", participating in each of the season's events, for the first time. They have become an established power in the abbreviated form of the game. They lost core team status a year later, but regained it for the 2012–13 series in a qualifying tournament held as part of the 2012 Hong Kong Sevens.

== See also ==
- Sport in Portugal
- Rugby union in Brazil - the game has a small foothold in the largest Portuguese speaking nation.
- Rugby union in Macau, a Portuguese territory until 1999.
