= Rugby Clube de Santarém =

Portuguese rugby union team

Santarém
- Full name: Rugby Clube de Santarém
- Founded: 1995 (as Escola Superior Agrária de Santarém)
- President: George Stilwell (also captain)
- Coach(es): Diogo Campilho
- League(s): Campeonato Nacional de Rugby I Divisão
Team kit

Rugby Clube de Santarém is a rugby team based in Santarém, Portugal. As of the 2012/13 season, they play in the First Division of the Campeonato Nacional de Rugby (National Championship).

== History ==
The club was founded in 1995 as Escola Superior Agrária de Santarém.
