= St. John de Britto College =

- Portuguese: Colégio de São João de Brito
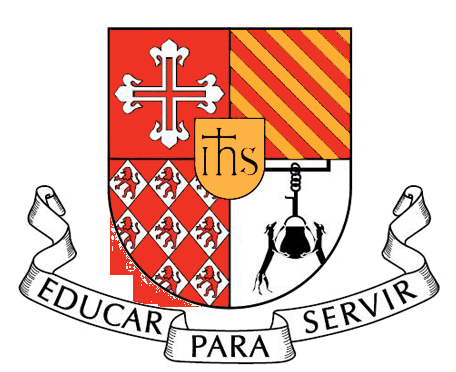

Location
- Lisbon, Lumiar; Portugal
- Coordinates: 38°46′25.25″N 9°9′28.4″W

Information
- Type: Private primary and secondary school
- Motto: Portuguese: Educar para Servir (Educate to Serve)
- Religious affiliation: Catholicism
- Denomination: Jesuit
- Patron saint: John de Britto
- Established: 1947; 79 years ago
- Gender: Co-educational
- Enrollment: 1,500
- Colors: Red, blue, and sometimes yellow
- Athletics: Football, handball, volleyball, biathlon, chess, swimming
- Affiliations: Colégio das Caldinhas (INA); Colégio da Imaculada Conceição de Coimbra
- Website: www.csjb.pt

St. John de Britto College (Portuguese: Colégio de São João de Brito) is a private Catholic primary and secondary school, located in Lumiar, Portugal. The school was founded by the Society of Jesus in 1947 and its teachings are based on Ignatian pedagogy and spirituality. The school is chartered and has autonomy for an indefinite period.

== Notable alumni ==
- Ricardo Araújo Pereira - actor and comedian
- Paulo Portas - politician
- Miguel Portas - politician
- António Pires de Lima - politician
- Ary dos Santos - poet
- João Só - musician
- João Vale e Azevedo - S.L.Benfica president
- Inês Sousa Real - Politician and extra e popular portuguese TV show Morangos com Açucar

== See also ==
- Catholic Church in Portugal
- Education in Portugal
- List of Jesuit schools
