= Estádio Municipal Sérgio Conceição =

Soccer stadium in Portugal

Coordinates: 40°11′12.59″N 8°30′34.86″W

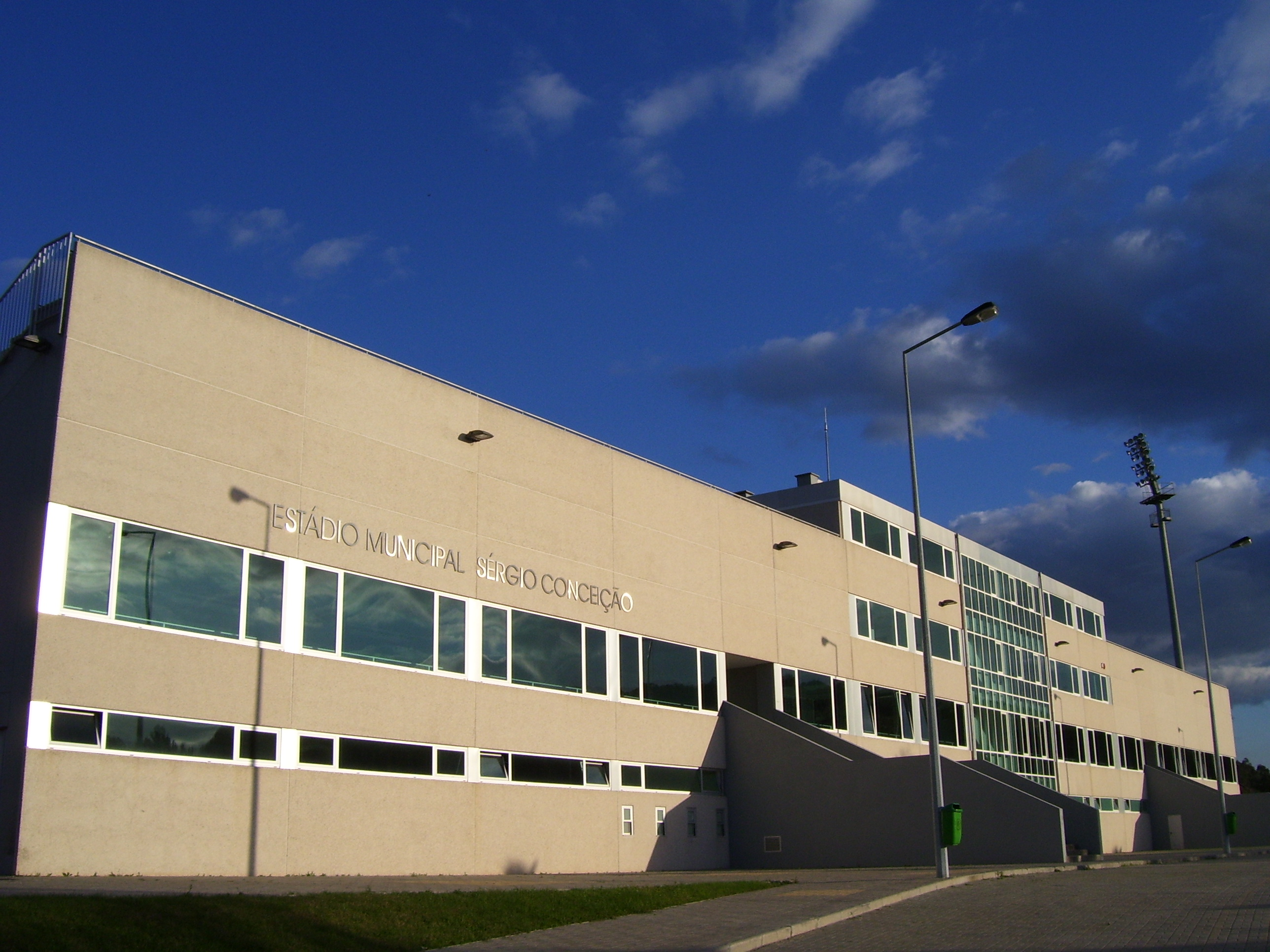
Estádio Municipal Sérgio Conceição

Estádio Municipal Sérgio Conceição (Sérgio Conceição Municipal Stadium) is a football stadium in Taveiro, in the city of Coimbra, Portugal. Built in 2002, it has 2,500 seats and was named after Sérgio Conceição, a football player born in Coimbra.

The stadium belongs to the municipality of Coimbra and is the home ground for the football teams of two local sports clubs: Clube de Futebol União de Coimbra and União Desportiva Taveirense.

Académica de Coimbra's home ground, the Estádio Cidade de Coimbra, was rebuilt, expanded, and modernized to host some UEFA Euro 2004 matches, and because of it, during most of the 2002–03 season Académica de Coimbra played their home games at this stadium.
