= Campeonato Nacional de Rugby =

Portuguese rugby union competition

Campeonato Nacional de Rugby is the main rugby union competition in Portugal. This championship is organized by the Portuguese Rugby Federation. The competition is organized into three Divisions:

- CN Honra/Super Bock (8 teams)
- Campeonato Nacional de Rugby I Divisão (8 teams)
- Campeonato Nacional de Rugby II Divisão (4 groups of 5/6 teams each)
