= Tapada da Ajuda =

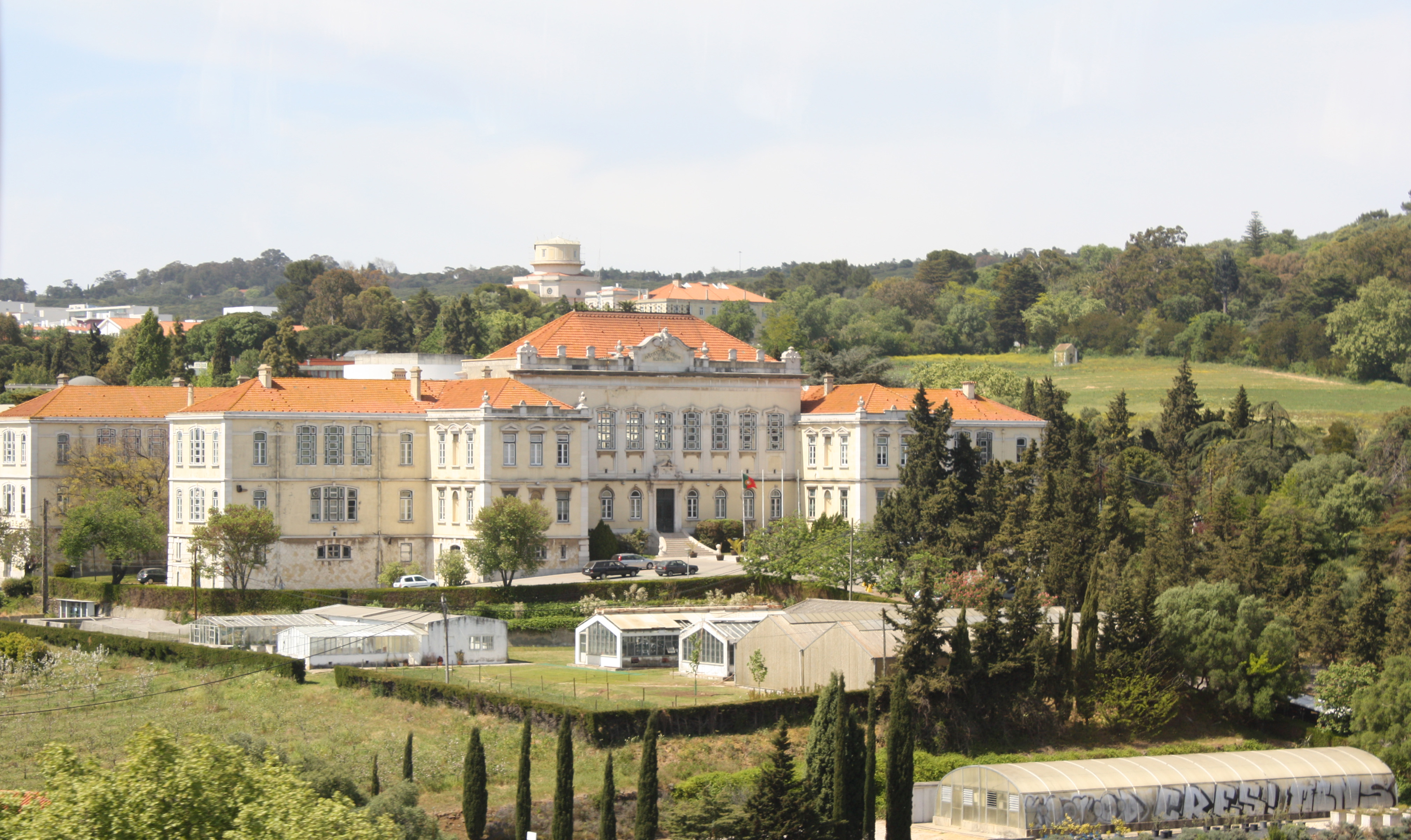
- View of the Higher Institute of Agronomy in Tapada da Ajuda
- Interactive map of Tapada da Ajuda
- Type: Public
- Location: Lisbon, Portugal
- Area: 100 ha (250 acres)
- Operator: Instituto Superior de Agronomia

Tapada da Ajuda is a green space located in Lisbon, in the parish of Alcântara.

It occupies a walled area of one hundred hectares, of free entrance. The main entrance is located on Calçada da Tapada, in the Alcântara area.

In this space, corresponding to a former royal and confining north to the Monsanto Forest Park, there are the Lisbon Astronomical Observatory, the Instituto Superior de Agronomia, an Exhibition Pavilion and the playing fields of Agronomia (rugby). At the highest point of Tapada, next to the geodesic landmark (134 m; 440 ft altitude), there is a belvedere that offers a vast panorama over the river Tagus.

In addition, a city from the end of the Bronze Age has been discovered in the place.
