= Lisbon University Stadium =

Sports venue in Lisbon, Portugal

- Estádio Universitário de Lisboa
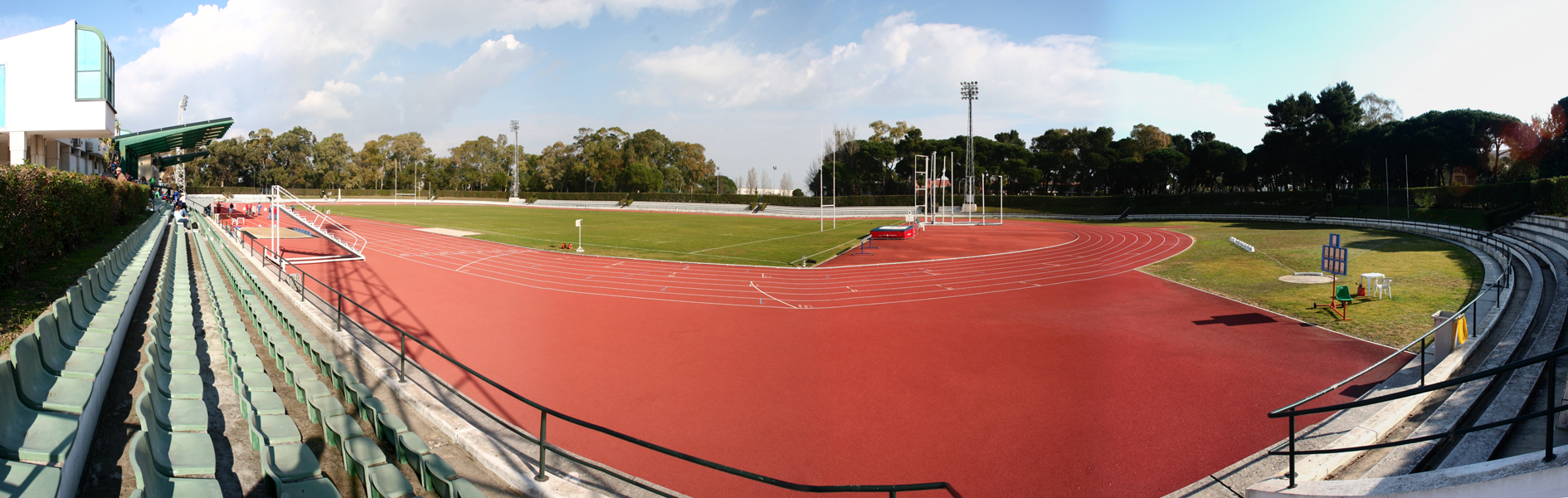
- Panoramic view of the stadium
- Interactive map of Lisbon University Stadium
- Location: Lisbon, Portugal
- Coordinates: 38.7520°N 9.1618°W
- Owner: University of Lisbon
- Capacity: 3,677 (Estádio de Honra)

Construction
- Opened: 1956

Tenants
- Portugal national rugby union team S.L. Benfica (rugby union)

The Lisbon University Stadium (Portuguese: Estádio Universitário de Lisboa) is a unit within the University of Lisbon, and a multivenue park located in Alvalade, Lisbon, comprising several sports facilities, and mostly known for its main venue and namesake, the Estádio de Honra, a multi-use stadium. It also includes several indoors arenas, tennis courts, football fields, a golf course, a swimming pool complex and a medical centre. It was under direct government management until 2013, when it was integrated in the university.

== History ==
The stadium was created as part of the Cidade Universitária de Lisboa, the university campus promoted by the Estado Novo to house (most) faculties of the University of Lisbon. It was built following a plan by architects João Simões and Norberto Correia and was inaugurated on May 7, 1956.

In 1962 the stadium was one of the main stages of the Academic Crisis that would eventually lead to the resignation of the then-Rector of the university (and later Prime Minister of Portugal) Marcello Caetano.

In 2024, the board of directors of Sporting CP headed by Frederico Varandas renewed the protocol with the University of Lisbon, thus continuing the link that had been in place since 2007, and announced an investment of 3 million euros in the modernisation of the EUL Pole (Lisbon University Stadium Pole) in Lisbon, the home of the club's academy for under-13 football players, athletics and other sports. The improvements included the construction of new football pitches, the remodelling of the synthetic turf, the construction of new stands and nine changing rooms, as well as the use of the EUL swimming pool at specific times for Sporting CP's swimming teams and the remodelling and expansion of the administrative building, thus, in addition to men's and women's football, Sporting CP's swimming and rugby departments would also benefit from the works.

== Venues ==
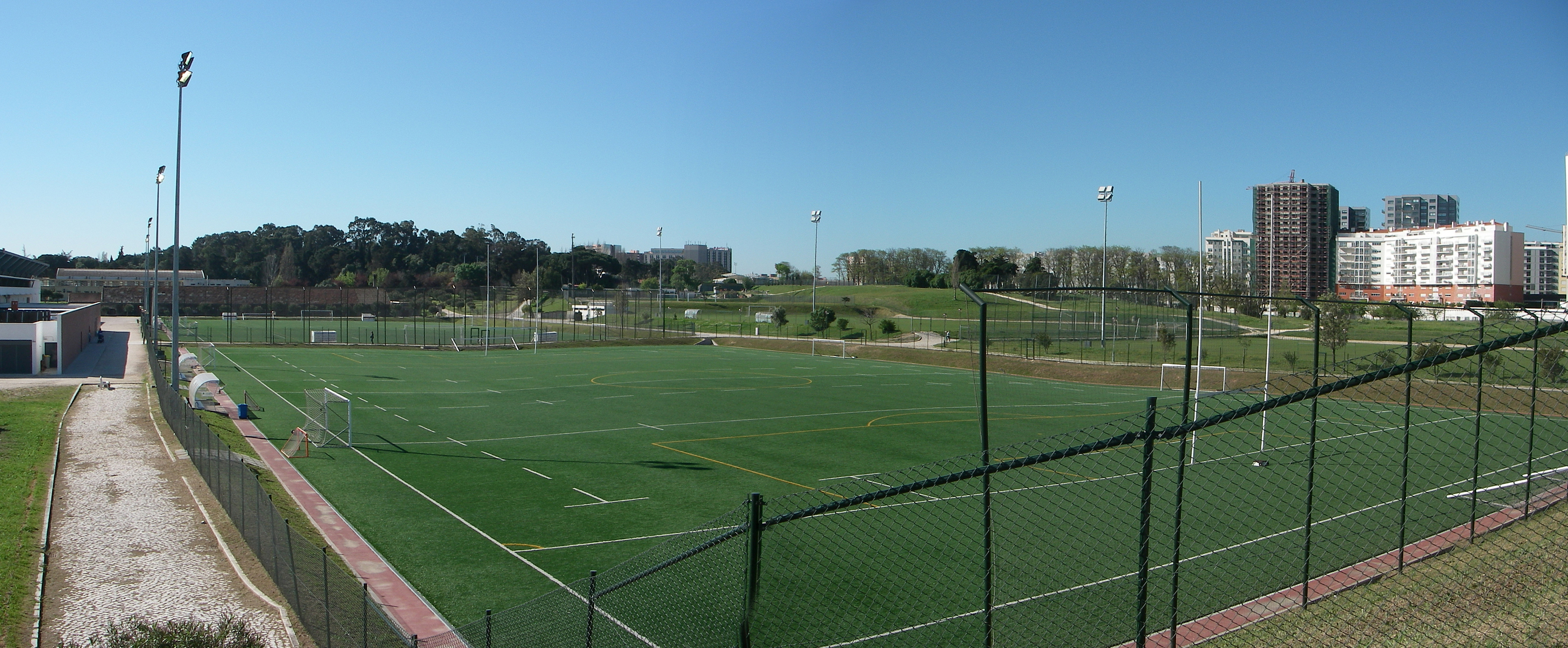
Training pitches at EUL

== Estádio de Honra ==
The capacity of the Estádio de Honra is 3,677 spectators. It is used as the home stadium of Portugal national rugby union team matches. It also hosted the 1994 World Junior Championships in Athletics.

=== Lusitanos XV ===
The Rugby governing body ERC announced on September 2 that the Portuguese representative club Lusitanos XV would hold their home games of the 2013-14 Amlin Challenge Cup at Estádio Nacional. However, all their home games of the 2013-14 Amlin Challenge Cup were played at the Estádio Universitário de Lisboa instead of Estádio Nacional.

== Swimming pools ==
The swimming pool complex was built in 1995-97 following a project by Frederico Valsassina Arquitectos. It opened in 1997 and includes a 50-metre olympic indoor pool.
