= Portuguese Rugby Federation =

Sports governing body in Portugal

Federação Portuguesa de Rugby
- Sport: Rugby union
- Founded: 1926; 100 years ago
- World Rugby affiliation: 1988
- Rugby Europe affiliation: 1934
- President: Carlos Amado da Silva
- Men's coach: Simon Mannix
- Women's coach: João Moura
- Website: www.fpr.pt

The Portuguese Rugby Federation (Portuguese: Federação Portuguesa de Rugby) is the governing body for rugby union in Portugal. It was founded in 1926 and became affiliated to the International Rugby Board in 1988.

== History ==
The first game of rugby union in Portugal was played in 1903 by British officials against British expats representing Lisbon Football Club. The predecessor union, the Associação de Rugby de Lisboa (English: Association of Rugby in Lisbon) was founded in 1926 by British and French expatriates alongside some local Portuguese players. This would later expand to cover the whole of Portugal with the Portuguese Rugby Federation being established as the national rugby union of Portugal in 1957. The PRF was a founder member of the Fédération Internationale de Rugby Amateur in 1934. They affiliated to the International Rugby Football Board in 1988. Following qualification to the 2007 Rugby World Cup leading to an increase in interest, the PRF stated that they were unable to keep up with the demand for rugby due to a lack of rugby facilities. This led to a downturn in Portuguese rugby through apathy and lack of media coverage. In 2023, the Portuguese Rugby Federation was awarded the Order of Public Instruction by the President of Portugal.

In 2019, the Portuguese Rugby Federation was subject of an international hoax whereby English local newspapers and The Rugby Paper asserted, based on a fake email, that a former England Deaf national rugby union team player had been offered the position as co-manager of the Portugal national rugby union team but the PRF. The PRF vice-president Joao Pereira Faria called The Rugby Paper to affirm this was false and ridiculed the PRF. Following this a retraction was printed.

== Operations ==
The Portuguese Rugby Federation organises the main rugby union championship of Portugal, the Campeonato Nacional de Rugby, and oversees the country's national teams—men's and women's, age-grade teams, and sevens teams for both men and women.

== National teams ==
- Portugal national rugby union team
- Portugal national rugby sevens team
- Portugal women's national rugby union team
