= Oliveira do Mondego =

- Civil parish
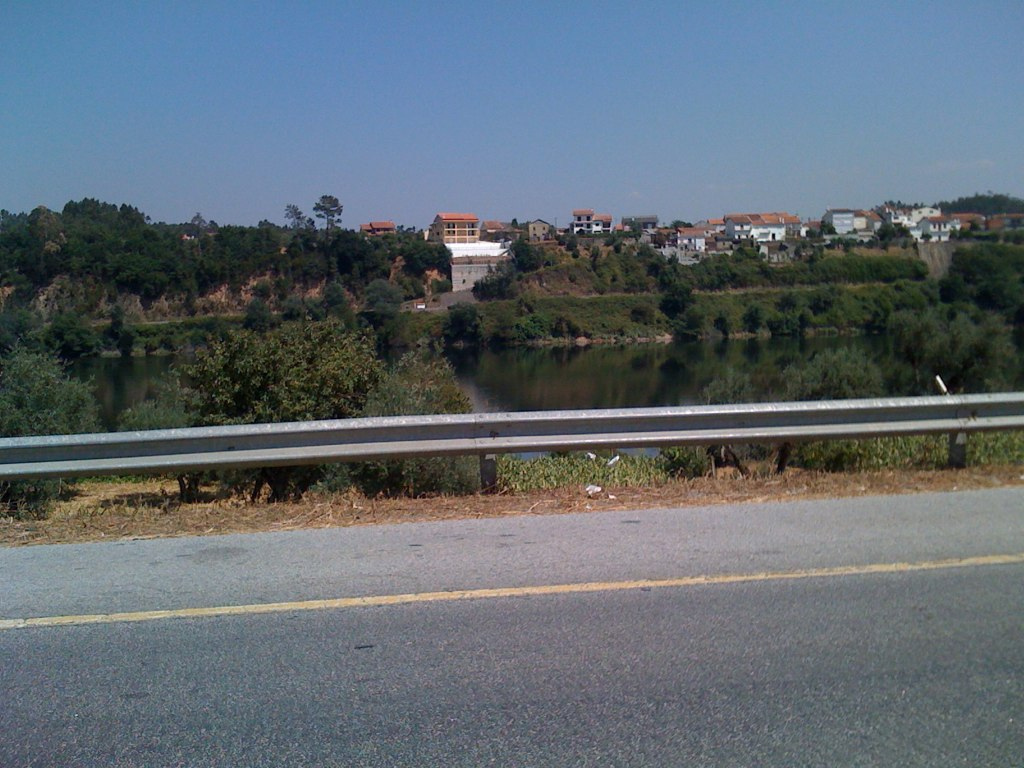
- Oliveira do Mondego seen in 2011

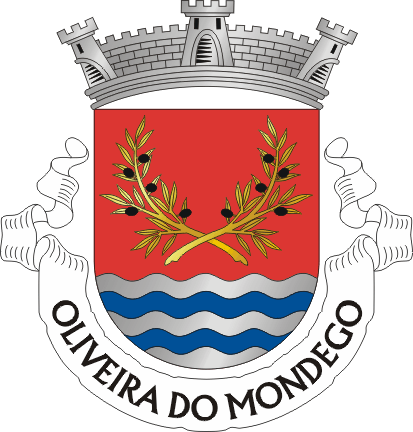
- Coat of arms

- Location in Portugal
- Coordinates: 40°19′21″N 8°13′31″W
- Country: Portugal
- Region: Centro
- Intermunic. comm.: Região de Coimbra
- District: Coimbra
- Municipality: Penacova
- Disbanded: 2013

Area
  - Total: 12.22 km^{2} (4.72 sq mi)

Population (2011)
  - Total: 658
  - Density: 53.8/km^{2} (139/sq mi)
- Time zone: UTC+00:00 (WET)
  - Summer (DST): UTC+01:00 (WEST)

Oliveira do Mondego, previously known as Oliveira do Cunhedo, is a Portuguese village and former freguesia of Portugal located in the municipality of Penacova.

In 2013 the freguesia was extinct, leading it to be merged with Travanca do Mondego, creating the new Oliveira do Mondego e Travanca do Mondego.

The Raiva Dam and the mouth of the Alva River are located here.

Its previous name of Oliveira do Cunhedo lasted until 1912, when it was changed to its current form.

== Population ==
Population of the parish of Oliveira do Mondego
1864	1878	1890	1900	1911	1920	1930	1940	1950	1960	1970	1981	1991	2001	2011
921	1 099	992	1 053	1 037	878	747	1 014	1 012	921	839	781	793	734	658

Between the census of 1864 and 1911 the parish was registered under the name Oliveira do Cunhado. By the decree of 24/08/1912 it adopted its current designation (Source: INE)

The population of the former parish of Oliveira do Mondego was distributed among the following localities:

- Alto das Lamas
- Areeiro
- Bairro Martins Soares
- Coiço
- Cunhedo
- Lavradio
- Oliveira do Mondego
- Paredes
- Porto da Raiva
