= Castle of Lousã =

Castle in Lousã, Portugal

- Castelo de Lousã
- Lousã e Vilarinho, Lousã, Coimbra in Portugal
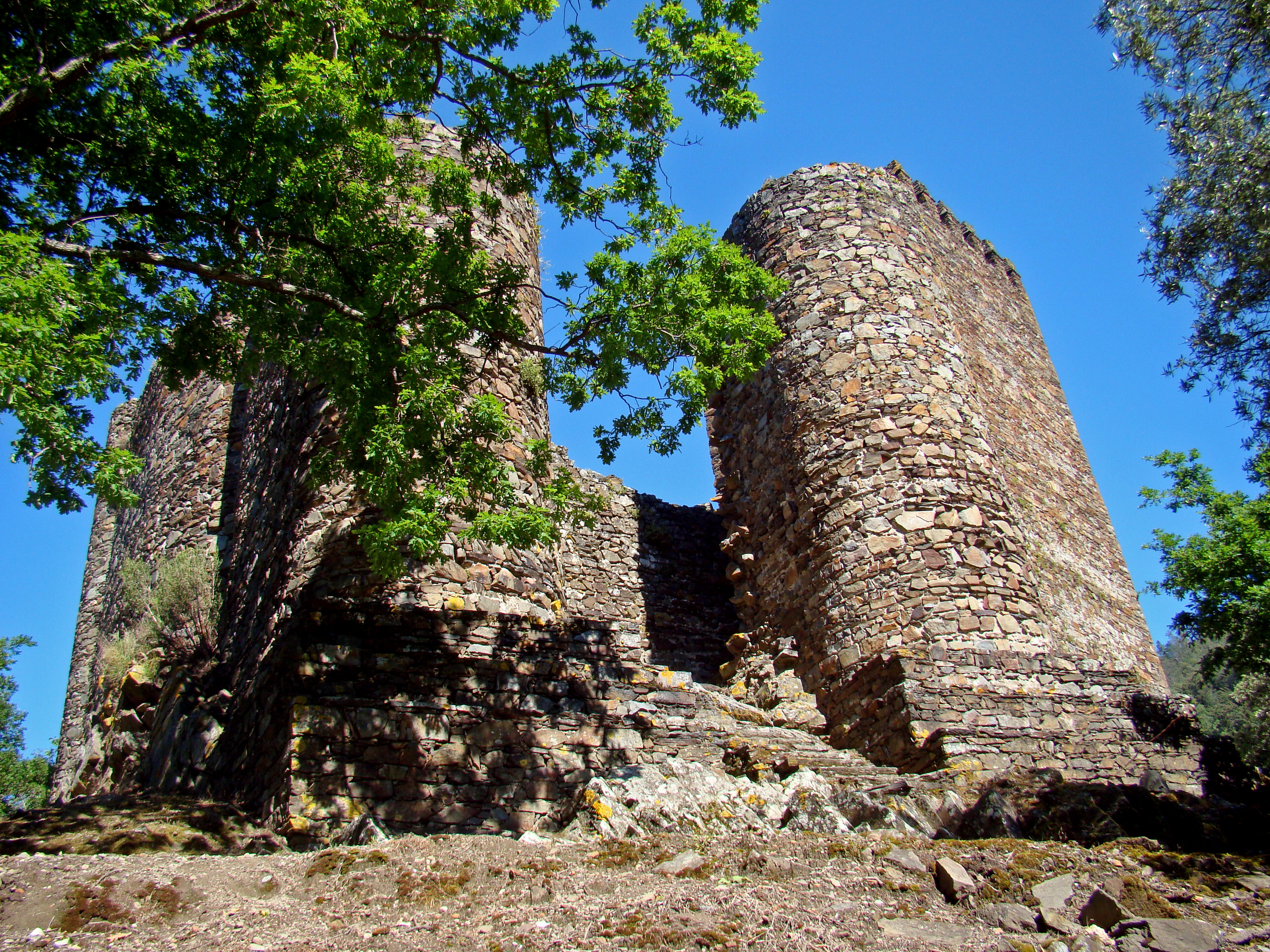
- View of the outer walls of the Castle of Lousã

Site information
- Type: Castle
- Owner: Portuguese Republic
- Open to the public: Public

Location
- Coordinates: 40°06′03″N 8°14′08″W

Site history
- Built: 11th Century
- Materials: Granite, Shale, Clay, Cement

The Castle of Lousã (Portuguese: Castelo da Lousã), also known as the Castle of Arouce (Portuguese: Castelo de Arouce), is a classified National Monument situated 2 kilometres (1.2 mi) from the civil parish of Lousã e Vilarinho, municipality of Lousã. It was constructed in the second-half of the 11th century, on the right margin of the River Arouce.

== History ==
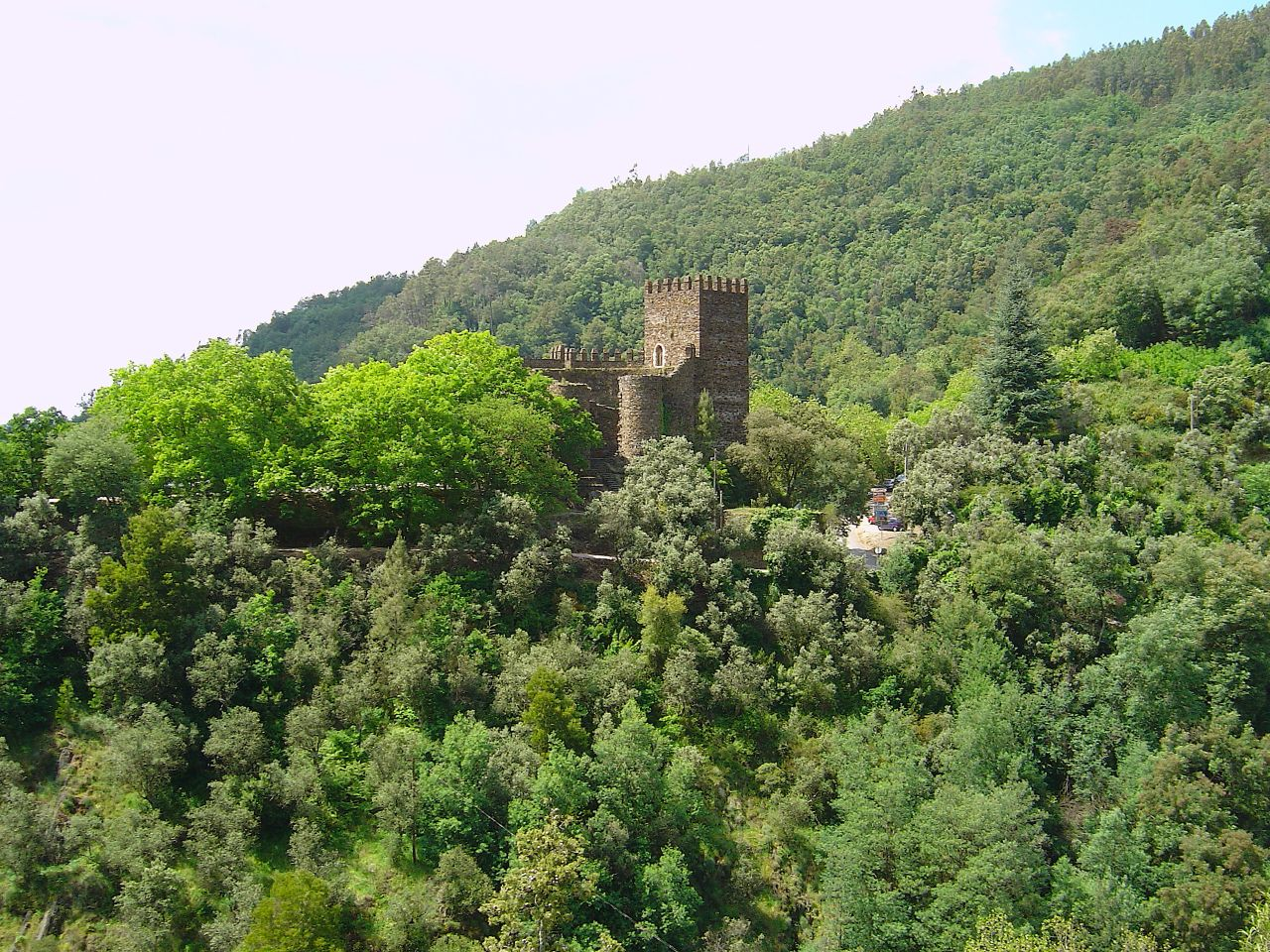
A view of the Castle of Lousã in the forested valley of the River Arouce

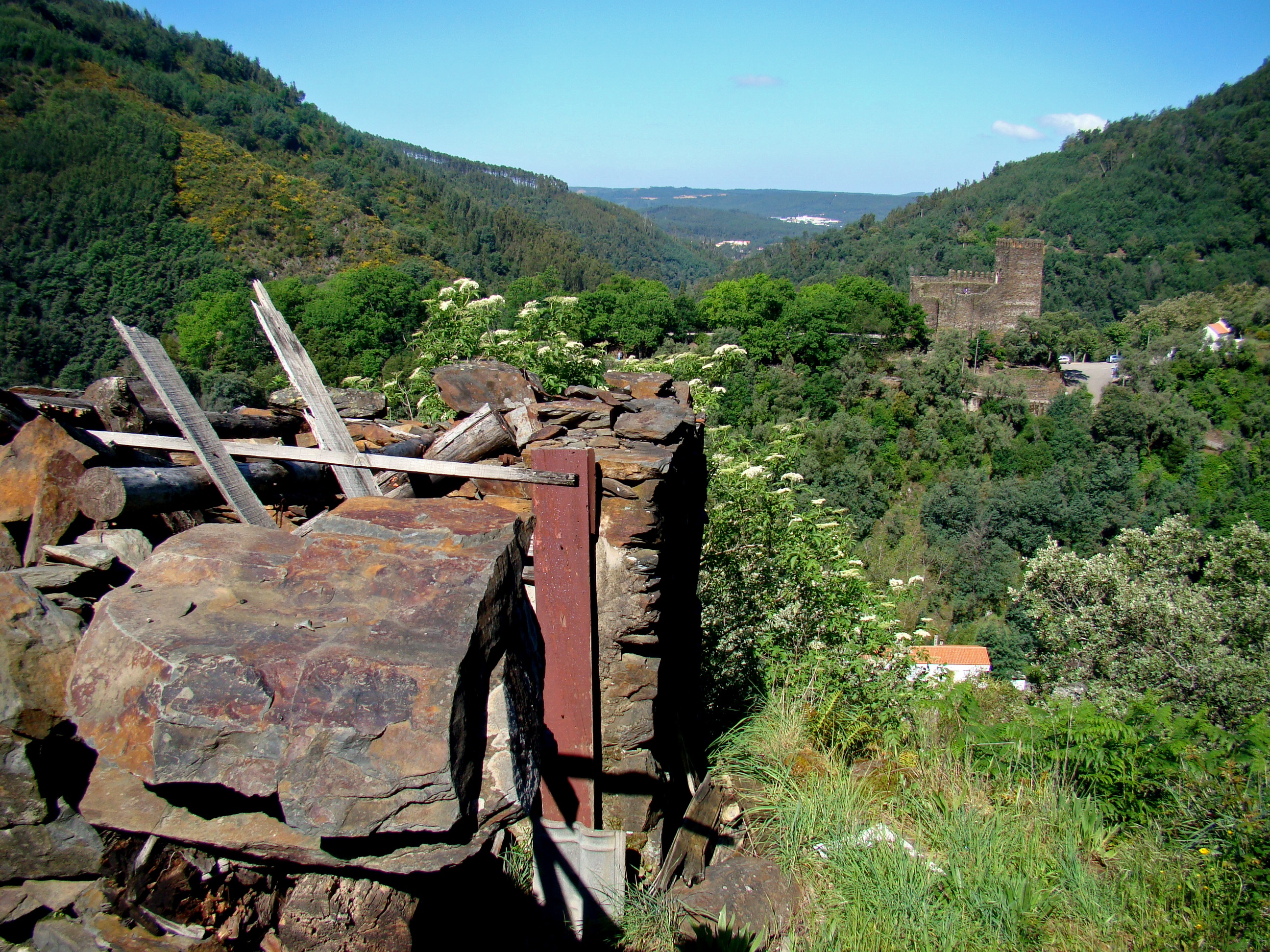
The abandoned structures that encirle the castle along the valley

In 1080, count Sisnando Davides occupied the settlement of Lousã peacefully (but was later reoccupied by the Moors). The castle was part of the first defensive lines constructed to protect the access-ways to Coimbra, during the count's stewardship, during the second-half of the 11th century. The smaller perimeter of the military structure corresponded to this early period, with later expansions associated with the early middle ages.

It was in 1124, when the Moorish garrison fell and the castle was re-occupied by the forces of D. Teresa, who completed reparation of the defenses. Eventually, the royal court of Queen D. Mafalda would spend her summers in the settlement and castle.

During the early years of the Portuguese monarchy, the region occupied an important position owing to its frontier status. In 1124, Moorish incursions were responsible for taking the castle. In 1151, a foral was issued by D. Afonso Henriques, owing to its military importance: during the 12th century, there were several raids by Moors across the valley of Zêzere. By that time, Lousã was no longer a frontier town, owing to the conquest of Santarém, Lisbon and Palmela in 1147. During this time, the kingdom had a policy of settlement that attempted to fix and stabilize the Portuguese population centers and promote further occupation of the land.

The keep tower was constructed during the 14th Century.

A new foral was issued in 1513 by King D. Manuel. As its military role ceased to be important, the castle fell into disuse.

Until 1759, the signeurial rights to the region were maintained by the Dukes of Aveiro, but were transferred back to the Crown.

Between the 1940s and 1960s, the DGEMN Direção-Geral dos Edifícios e Monumentos Nacionais (Directorate-General for the Buildings and National Monuments) promoted substantial remodeling to reinforce the structure. Rights to the castle and land were ceded to the municipality on 10 August 1957; on 27 April 2019, the re-qualified castle was inaugurated, later to include a newly constructed viewpoint and visitors' center.

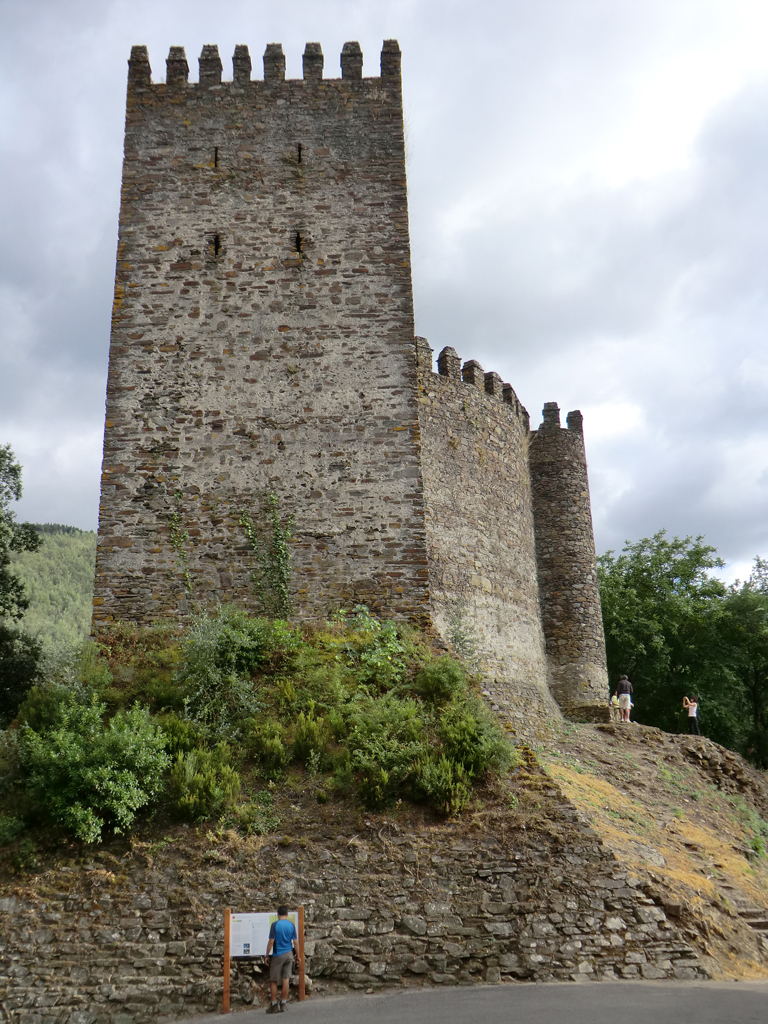
Castle of Lousã

== Sources ==
- Almeida, João, Roteiro Monumentos Militares Portugueses (in Portuguese), Lisbon, Portugal
- Larcher, Jorge (1935), Castelos de Portugal (in Portuguese), Coimbra, Portugal
- Correia, Vergílio (1950), O Castelo da Lousã - Centenário Turístico (in Portuguese), Lousã Portugal
- DGEMN, ed. (17 March 1971), "Castelo da Lousã", Boletim da Direcção-Geral dos Edifícios e Monumentos Nacionais (in Portuguese)
- Gil, Júlio (1986), Os Mais Belos Castelos e Fortalezas de Portugal (in Portuguese), Lisbon, Portugal
- Leal, Pinho (1874), Portugal Antigo e Moderno (in Portuguese), Lisbon, Portugal
