= Lousa =

Lousa or Lousã may refer to the following places in Portugal:

- Lousa (Castelo Branco), a village in Castelo Branco Municipality
- Lousa (Loures), a village in Loures Municipality
- Lousa (Torre de Moncorvo), a village in Torre de Moncorvo Municipality
- Lousã, a town in Coimbra District
- Lousã Municipality, a municipality in Coimbra District
- Lousã (parish), a village in Coimbra District
