= Raiva Dam =

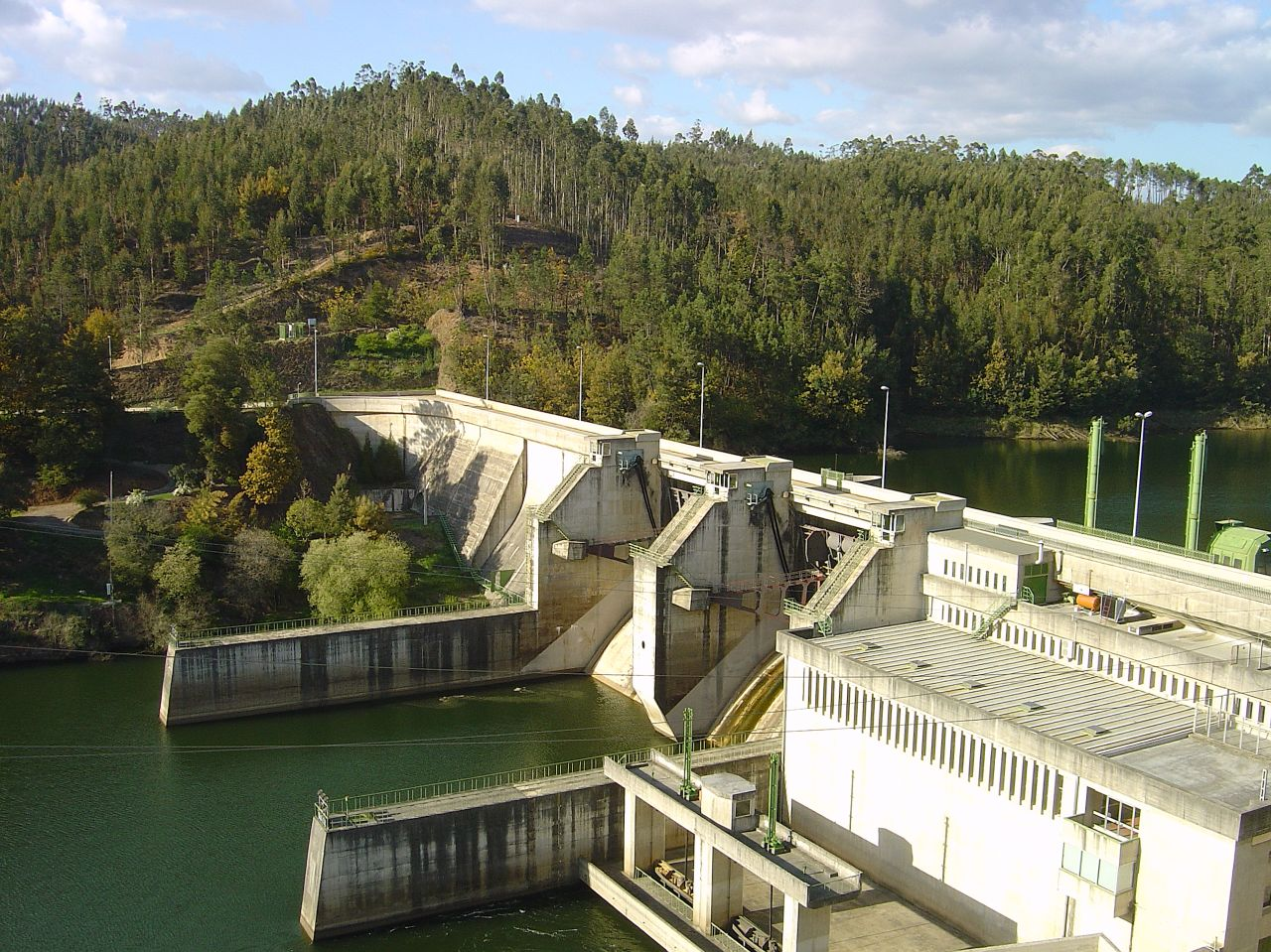

- Location within Portugal
- Official name: Barragem da Raiva
- Country: Portugal
- Location: municipality Penacova, Coimbra District
- Coordinates: 40°18′34.1″N 8°14′55.8″W
- Purpose: Power, flood control
- Status: Operational
- Opening date: 1981
- Owner: Companhia Portuguesa de Produção de Electricidade
- Operator: Energias de Portugal

Dam and spillways
- Type of dam: Concrete gravity dam
- Impounds: Mondego
- Height (foundation): 36 m (118 ft)
- Height (thalweg): 34 m (112 ft)
- Length: 200 m (660 ft)
- Elevation at crest: 64.5 m (212 ft)
- Dam volume: 85,000 m^{3} (3,000,000 cu ft)
- Spillway type: Over the dam
- Spillway capacity: 2,000 m^{3}/s (71,000 cu ft/s)

Reservoir
- Total capacity: 24,110,000 m^{3} (19,550 acre⋅ft)
- Active capacity: 14,710,000 m^{3} (11,930 acre⋅ft)
- Surface area: 2.3 km^{2} (0.89 mi^{2})
- Normal elevation: 61.5 m (202 ft)

Power Station
- Operator: Energias de Portugal
- Commission date: 1982
- Hydraulic head: 18 m (59 ft) (max)
- Turbines: 2 x 13 MW Francis-type
- Installed capacity: 24 MW
- Annual generation: 44.9 GWh

Raiva Dam (Portuguese: Barragem da Raiva, also known as Barragem do Coiço) is a concrete gravity dam on the Mondego. It is located in the municipality Penacova, in Coimbra District, Portugal.

The dam was completed in 1981. It is owned by Companhia Portuguesa de Produção de Electricidade (CPPE). The dam is used for power generation and flood control.

== Dam ==
Raiva Dam is a 36 m tall (height above foundation) and 200 m long gravity dam with a crest altitude of 64.5 m. The volume of the dam is 85,000 m³. The spillway with 2 radial gates is part of the dam body (maximum discharge 2,000 m³/s). There is also a bottom outlet.

== Reservoir ==
At full reservoir level of 61.5 m the reservoir of the dam has a surface area of 2.3 km^{2} and a total capacity of 24.11 mio. m³. The active capacity is 14.71 (12) mio. m³. The reservoir of Raiva Dam serves as lower reservoir for the Aguieira pumped-storage power plant, which is located about 10 km upstream of Raiva dam.

== Power plant ==
The hydroelectric power plant was commissioned in 1982 (1981). It is operated by EDP. The plant has a nameplate capacity of 24 (20) MW. Its average annual generation is 44.9 (44, 44.8, or 46) GWh.

The power station contains 2 Francis turbine-generators (horizontal shaft) with 13 MW (13 MVA) in a dam powerhouse located on the left side of the dam. The turbine rotation is 200 rpm. The minimum hydraulic head is 12 m, the maximum 18 m. Maximum flow per turbine is 80 m³/s.

== See also ==
- List of power stations in Portugal
- List of dams and reservoirs in Portugal
