= Lousã (parish) =

- Civil parish
- Location in Portugal
- Coordinates: 40.1108°N 8.2475°W
- Country: Portugal
- Region: Centro
- Intermunic. comm.: Região de Coimbra
- District: Coimbra
- Municipality: Lousã

Area
  - Total: 47.09 km^{2} (18.18 sq mi)

Population (2011)
  - Total: 10,163
  - Density: 215.8/km^{2} (559.0/sq mi)
- Time zone: UTC+00:00 (WET)
  - Summer (DST): UTC+01:00 (WEST)
- Postal code: 3200-953
- Area code: 239
- Patron: São Silvestre

Lousã (European Portuguese pronunciation: [loˈzɐ̃]) is a civil parish in the municipality of Lousã, Coimbra, Portugal. In 2013, the parish merged into the new parish Lousã e Vilarinho. It was restored in 2025. In 2011, its resident population included approximately 10163 residents, occupying an area of 47.09 square kilometres (18.18 sq mi).

== History ==
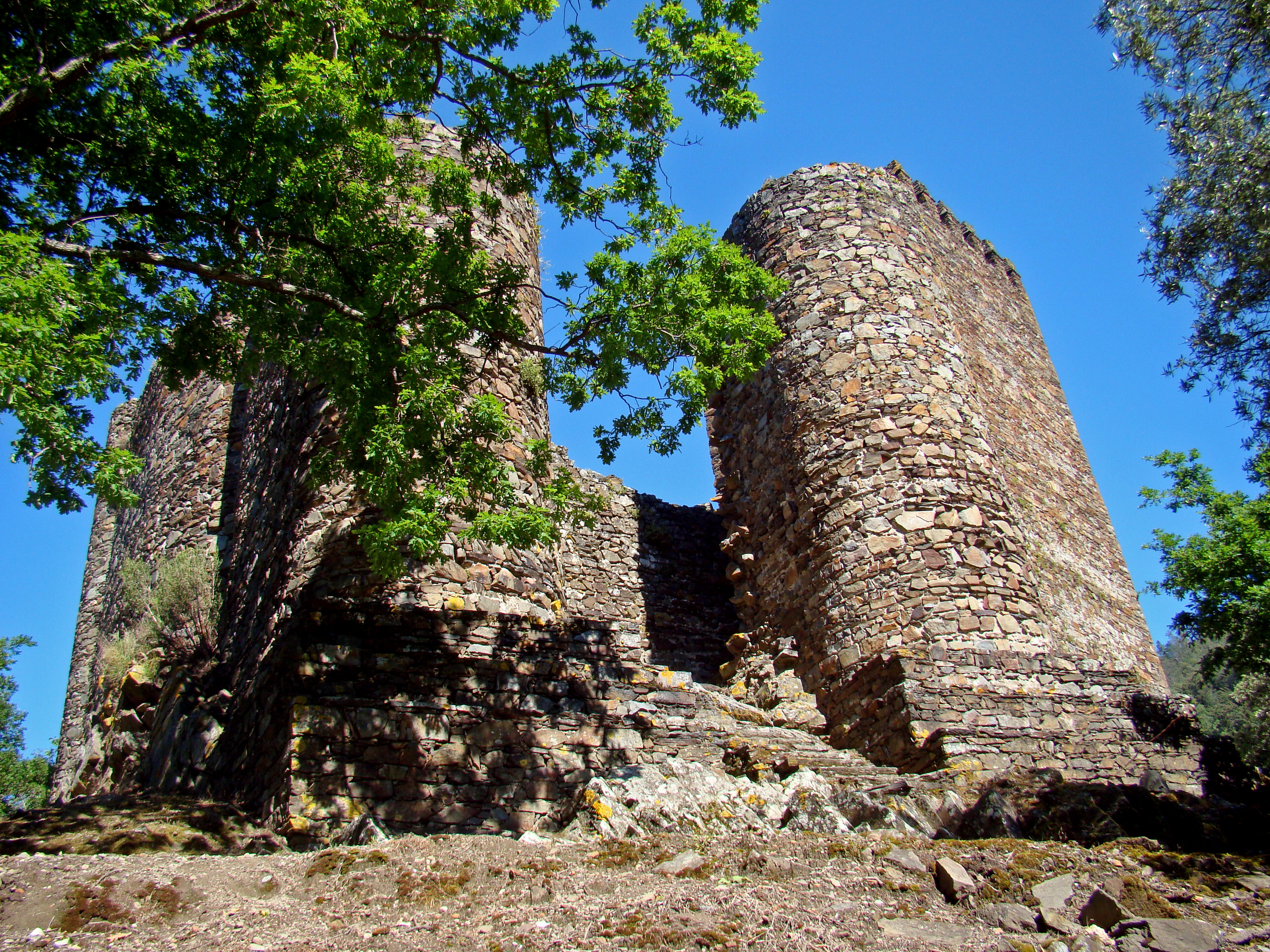
The imposing medieval castle of Lousã

Evidence provides an indication of a human presence in this territory from the Roman occupation of the Iberian peninsula. With the invasion of the Germanic people, Imperial Rome fragmented, and many of the colonies dispersed. But, in 943, there was a contract between Zuleima Abaiud and the abbey Mestúlio in the Monastery of Lorvão where, for the first time, the toponymic name Arauz appeared to designate the central place in this region. This included the identification of a built-up area around the Castle of Arouce. It was Sisnando Davides who was responsible for the conquest of the territory, and the reconstruction of the various castles, such as in Lousã/Arouce. Legend suggests that Lousã was founded by an emir, named Arunce, who wanted to protect his daughter Peralta, while he was away on campaigns in Northern Africa.

The Counts of Lousã, descendants of a Portuguese conqueror, António Correia, whose coat-of-arms is decorated with a depiction of the severed head of King Muqrin, the last Jabrid ruler of Bahrain, killed by Correia in battle.

=== Kingdom ===
The territory of Arouce, whose castle was already mentioned in the Foral of Miranda do Corvo (1136), and contemplated by Afonso Henriques, who issued a new foral in 1151. In another regal document, dated 1160, there is a reference to a "Lousã" that was independent of Arouce. A license was issued by King John III, on 23 May 1537, to the residents of Lousã to hold a Bodo de São João. During the Middle Ages, Lousã continued to prosper and, like many other lands in the kingdom, its old foral was confirmed by King Afonso II, installing a group of rules, privileges and rights, that were later revoked in 1513. On 25 October, of the same year, a new charter was issued by King Manuel I.

It was in the 18th century that Lousã transformed from modest village to a town, with roads lined with new buildings, housing the Portuguese nobility.

During the retreat of General Massena's troops at the end of the third Peninsular War, in March 1811, French troops stripped the silver from the parochial church, namely the rich bunk and chest, that Father Cáceres had donated to the temple in the 16th century, in addition to other items.

The old town includes several roads, surrounding the old square and (now) disappeared parochial church, municipal hall and tribunal, namely the streets Rua da Viscondessa do Espinhal, Rua das Forças Armadas and Rua Nova, where many of the towns Baroque-era solars are situated. The Misericórdia and other edifices of public interest, including the unattached Casal do Rio, with its palace and surrounding homes. It is practically at the end of the 19th century that Lousã began to expand beyond its 17th-century arteries, resulting in new buildings and collective structures: the hospital (which began operating in 1888); the new parochial church (also at the end of the century); the public slaughterhouse (in 1893); and the old theater, amongst others.

=== Republic ===
The inauguration of the railway in 1906 broke the region's isolation, which was complemented by the construction of several roadways. In 1924, the first electric lighting of the municipality was completed.

In the final decades of the 20th century, the area occupied by the town doubled, gained new territory, constructing modern neighborhoods, with primary and secondary schools, a fire station and new palace of justice. Apart from these modern facades, the old town still remains, with many of the older buildings, with their ornate windows and elaborated frames and cornices.

== Geography ==
The civil parish of Lousã, seat of the municipality, occupies an area of approximately 47 square kilometres (18 sq mi), encircled by mountains and natural resources. Its location is related to the communication channels formed by the morphology of the territory, that influenced human settlement in the last centuries. It is limited in the north by the parish of Foz de Arouce and Casal do Ermio; south, with the parish of Coentral (in the municipality of Castanheira de Pêra): east by the parish of Vilarinho; and west by the parishes of Gândaras, Miranda do Corvo and Vila Nova (municipality of Miranda do Corvo).

It includes the villages of:

- Alfocheira
- Alto Vistoso
- Arinto
- Cabeço do Moiro
- Cabo do Soito
- Cacilhas
- Candal
- Cano
- Carris
- Casal da Póvoa
- Casal dos Rios
- Casal Novo
- Catarredor
- Ceira dos Vales
- Chiqueiro
- Codessais
- Cômoros
- Cornaga
- Cova do Lobo
- Cruz de Ferro
- Eira de Calva
- Favariça
- Flor da Rosa
- Fonte dos Mouros
- Fonte Vidal
- Fórneas
- Lagartixa
- Levada
- Levegadas
- Marco do Espinho
- Meiral
- Padrão
- Pegos
- Penedo
- Picoto
- Pisoeiro
- Poças
- Ponte do Areal
- Ponte Quadiz
- Porta da Reguenga
- Portela de Vale de Maceira
- Porto da Pedra
- Póvoa da Lousã
- Ramalhais
- Regueiro
- Ribeiro Branco
- Talasnal
- Tapada do Penedo
- Tapada Regueiro
- Vale da Velha
- Vale de Neira
- Vale de Neira-A-Velha
- Vale Domingos
- Vale Maceira
- Vale Nogueira
- Vale Pereira do Areal
- Vale Porto da Pedra
- Vaqueirinho
- Zambujeiro
