= Penacova (parish) =

- Civil parish
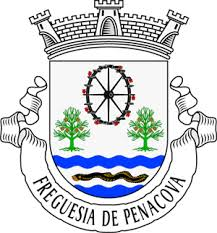
- Coat of arms

- Location in Portugal
- Coordinates: 40.271°N 8.282°W
- Country: Portugal
- Region: Centro
- Intermunic. comm.: Região de Coimbra
- District: Coimbra
- Municipality: Penacova

Area
  - Total: 32.42 km^{2} (12.52 sq mi)

Population (2011)
  - Total: 3,254
  - Density: 100/km^{2} (260/sq mi)
- Time zone: UTC+00:00 (WET)
  - Summer (DST): UTC+01:00 (WEST)

Penacova is a parish in Penacova Municipality, Portugal. The population in 2011 was 3,254, in an area of 32.42 km^{2}.
