= Travanca =

Travanca may refer to the following places in Portugal:

- Travanca (Amarante), a civil parish in the municipality of Amarante
- Travanca (Cinfães), a civil parish in the municipality of Cinfães
- Travanca (Mogadouro), a civil parish in the municipality of Mogadouro
- Travanca (Oliveira de Azeméis), a civil parish in the municipality of Oliveira de Azeméis
- Travanca (Santa Maria da Feira), a civil parish in the municipality of Santa Maria da Feira
- Travanca (Vinhais), a civil parish in the municipality of Vinhais
- Travanca de Lagos, a civil parish in the municipality of Oliveira do Hospital
- Travanca de Tavares, a civil parish in the municipality of Mangualde
- Travanca do Mondego, a civil parish in the municipality of Penacova
- Travancas, a civil parish in Chaves
