= Carvalho (Penacova) =

- Civil parish
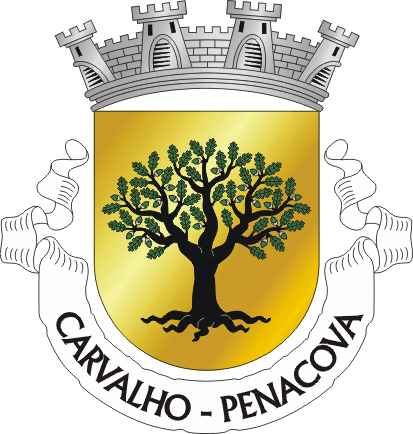
- Coat of arms

- Location in Portugal
- Coordinates: 40.330°N 8.313°W
- Country: Portugal
- Region: Centro
- Intermunic. comm.: Região de Coimbra
- District: Coimbra
- Municipality: Penacova

Area
  - Total: 30.14 km^{2} (11.64 sq mi)

Population (2011)
  - Total: 846
  - Density: 28/km^{2} (73/sq mi)
- Time zone: UTC+00:00 (WET)
  - Summer (DST): UTC+01:00 (WEST)

Carvalho is a parish in Penacova Municipality, Portugal. The population in 2011 was 846, in an area of 30.14 km².
