= Sazes do Lorvão =

- Civil parish
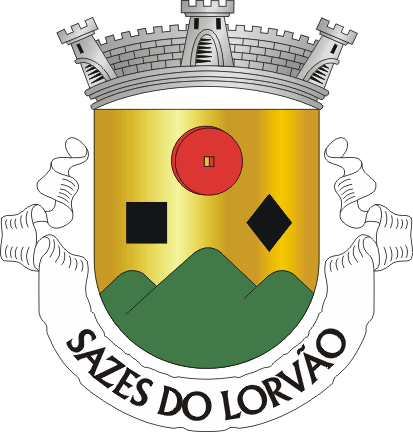
- Coat of arms

- Location in Portugal
- Coordinates: 40.314°N 8.336°W
- Country: Portugal
- Region: Centro
- Intermunic. comm.: Região de Coimbra
- District: Coimbra
- Municipality: Penacova

Area
  - Total: 17.86 km^{2} (6.90 sq mi)

Population (2011)
  - Total: 749
  - Density: 41.9/km^{2} (109/sq mi)
- Time zone: UTC+00:00 (WET)
  - Summer (DST): UTC+01:00 (WEST)

Sazes do Lorvão is a parish in Penacova Municipality, Portugal. The population in 2011 was 749, in an area of 17.86 km².
