= RC Lousã =

Portuguese rugby union club, based in Lousã

Lousã
- Full name: Rugby Club Lousã
- Founded: 1973; 53 years ago
- Ground(s): Estadio José Redondo, Lousã
- President: José Redondo
- Coach: Thomas Pieterse
- League: 2023–24 Campeonato Nacional de Rugby Divisão de Honra
Team kit

RC Lousã is a rugby union team based in Lousã, Portugal. As of 2022 they play in the honor league. Before that they played in the First Division of the Campeonato Nacional de Rugby from 2012 to 2022 (National Championship).

== History ==
The club was founded by José Redondo, after whom the club's home ground is named.

Their first match at senior level was against now-defunct GD Moitense, with Lousã prevailing 21-18.

== Current squad ==
According to Portuguese Rugby Federation

The RC Lousã squad for the 2023–24 TOP 10 season
**Props**: (Argentina) Fermin Conti; (France) Mathieu Lopes*; (Uruguay) Gabriel Blanco; (Brazil) João Henrique Santos; (South Africa) Marco Nortje; (Portugal) Bruno Pereira; **Hookers**: (England) Josh Gatt; **Locks**: (Brazil) **Kauã Guimarães**; (Portugal) Bruno Pinheiro; (Portugal) Bruno Santos; (Portugal) Diogo Forte	**Backrow**: (Portugal) Ricardo Reis; (Argentina) Exequiel Chedid; (Portugal) João Francisco dos Santos; (Portugal) Henrique Batista; (Portugal) João Barreto; (Portugal) Diogo Graça; **Scrum-halves**: (Ireland) Cirian Roberts; (Portugal) Pedro Dias dos Santos; **Fly-halves**: (Argentina) Thomas Guzman; (Argentina) Juan Agustín Graciarena	**Centres**: (Portugal) Daniel Lopes; (Portugal) João Campos; **Wingers**: (Argentina) Facundo Lopes; (Argentina) Giuliano Franchi; (South Africa) Cristiaan Brandt; (Portugal) Francisco Caetano; (Portugal) Gonçalo Graça; **Fullbacks**: (Portugal) Manuel Nogueira; (Portugal) Rui Freitas
(c) denotes the team captain, **Bold** denotes internationally capped players.
