= Francisco Maria Supico =

Portuguese journalist, freemason and politician

- Born: November 1, 1830; Lousã
- Died: August 20, 1911 (aged 80); São Miguel
- Occupations: Journalist, Politician

Francisco Maria Supico (1 November 1830 - 20 August 1911) was a Portuguese journalist, freemason and politician.
