= Oliveira do Mondego e Travanca do Mondego =

- Civil parish
- Location in Portugal
- Coordinates: 40.319°N 8.227°W
- Country: Portugal
- Region: Centro
- Intermunic. comm.: Região de Coimbra
- District: Coimbra
- Municipality: Penacova

Area
  - Total: 22.58 km^{2} (8.72 sq mi)

Population (2011)
  - Total: 1,079
  - Density: 47.79/km^{2} (123.8/sq mi)
- Time zone: UTC+00:00 (WET)
  - Summer (DST): UTC+01:00 (WEST)

Oliveira do Mondego e Travanca do Mondego is a civil parish in the municipality of Penacova, Portugal. It was formed in 2013 by the merger of the former parishes Oliveira do Mondego and Travanca do Mondego The population in 2011 was 1,079, in an area of 22.58 km^{2}.

They were once previously known as Oliveira do Cunhedo and Travanca de Farinha Podre, prior to changing to their modern designations in the 20th century.
