= 2023–24 Campeonato Nacional de Rugby Divisão de Honra =

Portugal rugby union season

2023–24 TOP 10
- Countries: Portugal
- Number of teams: 10
- Date: 14 October 2023 – 18 May 2024
- Champions: Belenenses
- Runners-up: Agronomia

Official website
- www.fpr.pt

The 2023–24 Campeonato Nacional Divisão de Honra competition, also known as TOP 10, is the 65th Portuguese domestic rugby union club competition operated by the Federação Portuguesa de Rugby (FPR).

== Format ==
The top six teams at the end of the regular season (after all the teams played one another twice, once at home, once away) enter a knockout stage to decide who will be crowned Portuguese champions. This consists of three rounds: the teams finishing third to sixth in the table play quarter-finals (hosted by the third and fourth placed teams). The winners then face the top two teams in the semi-finals, with the winners meeting in the final at the Campo de Rugby do Jamor in Oeiras.

Points are awarded according to the following:

- 4 points for a win
- 2 points for a draw
- 1 bonus point is awarded to a team scoring 4 tries or more in a match, while scoring at least 3 more tries than the opponent.
- 1 bonus point is awarded to a team that loses a match by 7 points or fewer

=== Promotion and relegation ===
The bottom team in the relegation play-out is relegated to the Campeonato Nacional de Rugby I Divisão, while the team that finishes 1st in the second tier of rugby union competitions in Portugal will replace the latter.

Following the refusal of the lower division champion RC Montemor of competing in this division, the same 10 teams that played last season will remain and compete again in the TOP 10. João Reis, the president of RC Montemor, stated, "We declined the promotion. We do not have the human or financial resources to maintain a level of competitiveness in that higher division."

== Teams ==
=== Stadia and locations ===
Location of teams in 2023–24 TOP 10

== Current Teams ==
Note: Flags indicate national union as has been defined under WR eligibility rules. Players may hold more than one non-WR nationality

Team	Manager	Captain	Stadium	Capacity
Académica	(South Africa) Sino Ganto	(Portugal) António Salgueiro	Estádio Municipal Sérgio Conceição	2500
Agronomia	(New Zealand) Kane Hancy	(Portugal) João Lima	Tapada da Ajuda	500
Belenenses	(Portugal) João Mirra	(Portugal) Tomás Sequeira	Belém Rugby Park	500
Benfica	(New Zealand) Travis Church	(Portugal) Francisco Bessa	Campo nº2 - Lisbon University	1500
Cascais	(Portugal) Frederico Sousa	(Portugal) António Vidinha	Estádio Municipal Dramático Cascais	1000
CDUL	(Argentina) Julio Farías	(Portugal) Tomás Appleton	Estádio Universitário de Lisboa	8000
CDUP	(Portugal) Francisco Vareta	(Portugal) Tomás Marrana	Estádio Universitário do Porto	1500
Direito	(Argentina) Enrique Pichot	(Portugal) Duarte Diniz	Complexo Desportivo Miguel Nobre Ferreira	2500
Lousã	(South Africa) Thomas Pieterse	(Portugal) Paulo Marques	Estádio Municipal de Rugby José Redondo	500
São Miguel	(South Africa) Nico Le Roux	(Fiji) Robert Delai	Bulldog Rugby Park	800

== Table ==
2023–24 TOP 10 Table
	Club	Played	Won	Drawn	Lost	Points For	Points Against	Points Diff.	Try Bonus	Losing Bonus	Points
1	Belenenses	18	16	0	2	733	257	476	9	0	73
2	Agronomia	18	12	2	4	621	318	303	10	1	63
3	Benfica	18	11	2	5	585	277	308	8	4	60
4	Direito	18	12	1	5	585	274	311	7	1	58
5	Cascais	18	12	1	5	589	361	228	4	1	55
6	CDUL	18	10	0	8	571	439	132	5	2	47
7	Académica	18	7	0	11	344	514	-170	2	1	31
8	São Miguel	18	4	0	14	318	623	-305	0	4	20
9	Lousã	18	2	0	16	297	772	-475	1	1	10
10	CDUP	18	1	0	17	210	1018	-808	0	1	5
Green background (rows 1 and 2) receive semi-final play-off places. Blue background (rows 3 to 6) receive quarter-final play-off places Red background (row 10) will be relegated to Campeonato Nacional de Rugby I Divisão. Updated: 03 May 2024

== Regular season ==
=== Round 1 ===
14 October 2023
12:00

Cascais	21-21	Direito
Try: 2x		Try: 0x

14 October 2023
14:00

CDUP	10-29	Académica
Try: 1x		Try: 5x

14 October 2023
14:30

Agronomia	20-43	Belenenses
Try: 2x		Try: 6x

14 October 2023
16:00

São Miguel	26-28	Lousã
Try: 2x		Try: 3x

Rest breaks: Benfica and CDUL

=== Round 2 ===
21 October 2023
12:00

Agronomia	28-25	Cascais
Try: 4x		Try: 3x

21 October 2023
15:00

Lousã	42-12	CDUP
Try: 6x		Try: 2x

21 October 2023
17:00

Belenenses	25-20	Benfica
Try: 1x		Try: 3x

22 October 2023
15:00

Académica	13-12	CDUL
Try: 1x		Try: 3x

Rest breaks: Direito and São Miguel

=== Round 3 ===
28 October 2023
14:00

Direito	16-13	Agronomia
Try: 1x Con: 1x Pen: 3x Drop: 0x		Try: 1x Con: 1x Pen: 2x Drop: 0x

Complexo Desportivo Miguel Nobre Ferreira
Referee: P. Duarte

28 October 2023
16:00

São Miguel	26-12	CDUP
Try: 2x Con: 2x Pen: 4x Drop: 0x		Try: 2x Con: 1x Pen: 0x Drop: 0x

Bulldog Rugby Park
Referee: R. Castro Hawkes

28 October 2023
16:30

Benfica	18-5	Cascais
Try: 2x Con: 1x Pen: 2x Drop: 0x		Try: 1x Con: 0x Pen: 0x Drop: 0x

Campo nº2 - Lisbon University
Referee: P.M. Silva

29 October 2023
14:00

CDUL	70-21	Lousã
Try: 12x Con: 5x Pen: 0x Drop: 0x		Try: 2x Con: 1x Pen: 3x Drop: 0x

Campo nº2 - Lisbon University
Referee: D. Miranda

Rest breaks: Académica and Belenenses

=== Round 4 ===
4 November 2023
14:00

Direito	52-22	Lousã
Try: 8x Con: 6x Pen: 0x Drop: 0x		Try: 3x Con: 2x Pen: 1x Drop: 0x

Complexo Desportivo Miguel Nobre Ferreira
Referee: M. Heitor

4 November 2023
14:00

Cascais	13-21	São Miguel
Try: 1x Con: 1x Pen: 2x Drop: 0x		Try: 2x Con: 1x Pen: 3x Drop: 0x

Estádio Municipal Dramático Cascais
Referee: R. Hawkes

4 November 2023
14:00

Benfica	34-15	Académica
Try: 6x Con: 2x Pen: 0x Drop: 0x		Try: 2x Con: 1x Pen: 1x Drop: 0x

Campo nº2 - Lisbon University
Referee: P.M. Silva

4 November 2023
16:00

CDUP	5-50	Agronomia
Try: 1x Con: 0x Pen: 0x Drop: 0x		Try: 8x Con: 5x Pen: 0x Drop: 0x

Estádio Universitário do Porto
Referee: F. Serra

16 March 2024
15:00

Belenenses	28-37	CDUL
Try: 4x		Try: 4x

Belém Rugby Park

=== Round 5 ===
10 November 2023
20:00

Agronomia	6-17	CDUL
Try: 0x Con: 0x Pen: 2x Drop: 0x		Try: 2x Con: 2x Pen: 1x Drop: 0x

Tapada da Ajuda
Referee: P. Duarte

11 November 2023
15:00

Belenenses	44-13	Académica
Try: 6x Con: 4x Pen: 2x Drop: 0x		Try: 1x Con: 1x Pen: 2x Drop: 0x

Belém Rugby Park
Referee: D. Inácio

11 November 2023
19:00

São Miguel	23-33	Direito
Try: 2x Con: 2x Pen: 3x Drop: 0x		Try: 4x Con: 2x Pen: 3x Drop: 0x

Bulldog Rugby Park
Referee: P.M. Silva

12 November 2023
15:00

Lousã	6-52	Benfica
Try: 0x Con: 0x Pen: 2x Drop: 0x		Try: 8x Con: 6x Pen: 0x Drop: 0x

Estádio Municipal de Rugby José Redondo
Referee: T. McLennan

24 February 2024
16:30

CDUP	8-70	Cascais
Try: 1		Try: 10

CDUP

=== Round 6 ===
18 October 2023
18:00

São Miguel	14-43	Benfica

18 November 2023
14:00

Direito	81-0	CDUP

18 November 2023
15:00

Académica	16-32	Agronomia

19 November 2023
16:00

Lousã	29-41	Belenenses

21 December 2023
16:00

CDUL	32-43	Cascais
Try: 4x Con: 3x Pen: 2x Drop: 0x		Try: 4x Con: 4x Pen: 5x Drop: 0x

=== Round 7 ===
1 December 2023
15:00

Cascais	24-17	Académica

1 December 2023
15:00

Agronomia	52-25	Lousã

2 December 2023
14:00

CDUP	26-38	Benfica

2 December 2023
14:00

CDUL	18-25	Direito

2 December 2023
18:00

São Miguel	10-46	Belenenses

=== Round 8 ===
8 December 2023
15:00

Académica	38-20	São Miguel

9 December 2023
14:00

Belenenses	30-17	Direito

9 December 2023
16:00

CDUP	21-50	CDUL

10 December 2023
14:00

Benfica	34-34	Agronomia

Rest breaks: Lousã and São Miguel

=== Round 9 ===
16 December 2023
15:00

Lousã	14-40	Cascais
Try: 2x Con: 2x Pen: 0x Drop: 0x		Try: 6x Con: 5x Pen: 0x Drop: 0x

Estádio Municipal de Rugby José Redondo

16 December 2023
15:00

Benfica	37-7	CDUL
Try: 5x Con: 3x Pen: 2x Drop: 0x		Try: 1x Con: 1x Pen: 0x Drop: 0x

Campo nº2 - Lisbon University

16 December 2023
15:00

Académica	5-52	Direito
Try: 1x Con: 0x Pen: 0x Drop: 0x		Try: 8x Con: 6x Pen: 0x Drop: 0x

Estádio Municipal Sérgio Conceição

16 December 2023
18:00

Agronomia	40-12	São Miguel
Try: 6x Con: 5x Pen: 0x Drop: 0x		Try: 2x Con: 1x Pen: 0x Drop: 0x

Tapada da Ajuda

17 December 2023
15:00

Belenenses	60-5	CDUP
Try: 10x Con: 5x Pen: 0x Drop: 0x		Try: 1x Con: 0x Pen: 0x Drop: 0x

Belém Rugby Park

=== Round 10 ===
6 January 2024
12:00

Cascais	16-32	Belenenses
Try: 1x Con: 1x Pen: 3x Drop: 0x		Try: 2x Con: 2x Pen: 6x Drop: 0x

Estádio Municipal Dramático Cascais
Referee: P.M. Silva

6 January 2024
14:00

Direito	16-17	Benfica
Try: 1x Con: 1x Pen: 3x Drop: 0x		Try: 2x Con: 2x Pen: 1x Drop: 0x

Complexo Desportivo Miguel Nobre Ferreira
Referee: F. Serra

6 January 2024
15:00

Lousã	18-30	Académica
Try: 2x Con: 1x Pen: 2x Drop: 0x		Try: 3x Con: 3x Pen: 3x Drop: 0x

Estádio Municipal de Rugby José Redondo
Referee: D. Miranda

7 January 2024
16:00

CDUL	67-12	São Miguel
Try: 10x Con: 7x Pen: 1x Drop: 0x		Try: 2x Con: 1x Pen: 0x Drop: 0x

Estádio Universitário de Lisboa
Referee: D. Inácio

Rest breaks: Agronomia and CDUP

=== Round 11 ===
13 January 2024
14:00

Direito	12-23	Cascais
Try: 0x Con: 0x Pen: 4x Drop: 0x		Try: 1x Con: 0x Pen: 6x Drop: 0x

Complexo Desportivo Miguel Nobre Ferreira
Referee: D. Miranda

13 January 2024
15:00

Académica	32-6	CDUP
Try: 5x Con: 2x Pen: 1x Drop: 0x		Try: 0x Con: 0x Pen: 2x Drop: 0x

Estádio Municipal Sérgio Conceição
Referee: M. Minelli

13 January 2024
16:00

Belenenses	20-34	Agronomia
Try: 2x Con: 2x Pen: 2x Drop: 0x		Try: 4x Con: 4x Pen: 2x Drop: 0x

Belém Rugby Park
Referee: P. Duarte

14 January 2024
15:00

Lousã	6-17	São Miguel
Try: 0x Con: 0x Pen: 2x Drop: 0x		Try: 2x Con: 2x Pen: 1x Drop: 0x

Estádio Municipal de Rugby José Redondo
Referee: P.M. Silva

Rest breaks: Benfica and CDUL

=== Round 12 ===
20 January 2024
12:00

Cascais	19-9	Agronomia
Try: 1x Con: 1x Pen: 4x Drop: 0x		Try: 0x Con: 0x Pen: 3x Drop: 0x

Estádio Municipal Dramático Cascais
Referee: D. Miranda

20 January 2024
14:00

CDUL	37-14	Académica
Try: 4x Con: 4x Pen: 3x Drop: 0x		Try: 2x Con: 2x Pen: 0x Drop: 0x

Estádio Universitário de Lisboa
Referee: M. Heitor

20 January 2024
16:30

CDUP	28-27	Lousã
Try: 3x Con: 2x Pen: 3x Drop: 0x		Try: 4x Con: 2x Pen: 1x Drop: 0x

Estádio Universitário do Porto
Referee: D. Inácio

21 January 2024
16:30

Benfica	9-10	Belenenses
Try: 0x Con: 0x Pen: 3x Drop: 0x		Try: 1x Con: 1x Pen: 1x Drop: 0x

Campo nº2 - Lisbon University
Referee: P. Duarte

Rest breaks: Direito and São Miguel

=== Round 13 ===
27 January 2024
15:00

Académica	7-34	Benfica
Try: 1 Con: 1 Pen: 0 Drop: 0		Try: 5 Con: 3 Pen: 1 Drop: 0

Estádio Municipal Sérgio Conceição
Referee: T. McLennan

27 January 2024
15:00

Agronomia	75-5	CDUP
Try: 11; Con: 10; Pen: 0 Drop: 0		Try: 1 Con: 0 Pen: 0 Drop: 0

Tapada da Ajuda
Referee: F. Serra

27 January 2024
15:00

Lousã	3-47	Direito
Try: 0 Con: 0 Pen: 1 Drop: 0		Try: 7 Con: 6 Pen: 0 Drop: 0

Estádio Municipal de Rugby José Redondo
Referee: M. Minelli

27 January 2024
16:00

CDUL	6-21	Belenenses
Try: 0 Con: 0 Pen: 2 Drop: 0		Try: 2 Con: 1 Pen: 3 Drop: 0

Estádio Universitário de Lisboa
Referee: D. Inácio

27 January 2024
17h30

São Miguel	25-26	Cascais
Try: 3 Con: 2 Pen: 2 Drop: 0		Try: 2 Con: 2 Pen: 4 Drop: 0

Bulldog Rugby Park
Referee: P. Duarte

=== Round 14 ===
9 March 2024
18:00

Direito	23-13	São Miguel
Try: 2x Con: 2x Pen: 3x Drop: 0x		Try: 1x Con: 1x Pen: 2x Drop: 0x

Complexo Desportivo Miguel Nobre Ferreira

9 March 2024
16:00

Cascais	76-5	CDUP
Try: 12x Con: 8x Pen: 0x Drop: 0x		Try: 1x Con: 0x Pen: 0x Drop: 0x

Estádio Municipal Dramático Cascais

9 March 2024
14:00

CDUL	7-38	Agronomia
Try: 1x Con: 1x Pen: 0x Drop: 0x		Try: 6x Con: 4x Pen: 0x Drop: 0x

Estádio Universitário de Lisboa

9 March 2024
15:00

Académica	0-24	Belenenses
Try: 0x Con: 0x Pen: 0x Drop: 0x		Try: 3x Con: 3x Pen: 1x Drop: 0x

Estádio Municipal Sérgio Conceição

10 March 2024
16:00

Benfica	49-0	Lousã
Try: 9x Con: 2x Pen: 0x Drop: 0x		Try: 0x Con: 0x Pen: 0x Drop: 0x

Campo nº2 Lisbon University

=== Round 15 ===
23 March 2024
15:00

Cascais	45-26	CDUL
Try: 6x Con: 3x Pen: 3x Drop: 0x		Try: 4x Con: 3x Pen: 0x Drop: 0x

Estádio Municipal Dramático Cascais

23 March 2024
19:00

Benfica	41-12	São Miguel
Try: 6x Con: 4x Pen: 1x Drop: 0x		Try: 2x Con: 1x Pen: 0x Drop: 0x

Campo nº2 Lisbon University

23 March 2024
16:30

CDUP	12-76	Direito
Try: 2x Con: 1x Pen: 0x Drop: 0x		Try: 12x Con: 8x Pen: 0x Drop: 0x

Estádio Universitário do Porto

24 March 2024
15:00

Agronomia	56-28	Académica
Try: 8x Con: 8x Pen: 0x Drop: 0x		Try: 4x Con: 4x Pen: 0x Drop: 0x

Tapada da Ajuda

24 March 2024
15:00

Belenenses	84-0	Lousã
Try: 12x Con: 12x Pen: 0x Drop: 0x		Try: 0x Con: 0x Pen: 0x Drop: 0x

Belém Rugby Park

=== Round 16 ===
29 March 2024
12:00

Direito	22-30	Belenenses

Complexo Desportivo Miguel Nobre Ferreira

29 March 2024
15:00

CDUL	80-7	CDUP

Estádio Universitário de Lisboa

29 March 2024
18:00

Agronomia	12-12	Benfica

Tapada da Ajuda

30 March 2024
16:00

São Miguel	25-29	Académica

Bulldog Rugby Park

Rest breaks: Cascais and Lousã

=== Round 17 ===
6 April 2024
14:00

Direito	39-6	CDUL
Try: 5x Con: 4x Pen: 2x Drop: 0x		Try: 0x Con: 0x Pen: 2x Drop: 0x

Complexo Desportivo Miguel Nobre Ferreira

6 April 2024
15:00

Benfica	85-7	CDUP
Try: 13x Con: 10x Pen: 0x Drop: 0x		Try: 1x Con: 1x Pen: 0x Drop: 0x

Campo nº2 Lisbon University

6 April 2024
15:00

Académica	31-40	Cascais
Try: 4x Con: 4x Pen: 1x Drop: 0x		Try: 6x Con: 5x Pen: 0x Drop: 0x

Estádio Municipal Sérgio Conceição

6 April 2024
18:00

Belenenses	78-0	São Miguel
Try: 12x Con: 9x Pen: 0x Drop: 0x		Try: 0x Con: 0x Pen: 0x Drop: 0x

Belém Rugby Park

7 April 2024
15:00

Lousã	10-40	Agronomia
Try: 1x Con: 1x Pen: 1x Drop: 0x		Try: 6x Con: 5x Pen: 0x Drop: 0x

Estádio Municipal de Rugby José Redondo

=== Round 18 ===
13 April 2024
15:00

Cascais	28-26	Benfica
Try: 3x Con: 2x Pen: 3x Drop: 0x		Try: 2x Con: 2x Pen: 4x Drop: 0x

Estádio Municipal Dramático Cascais

14 April 2024
12:00

Agronomia	28-7	Direito
Try: 4x Con: 1x Pen: 2x Drop: 0x		Try: 1x Con: 1x Pen: 0x Drop: 0x

Tapada da Ajuda

13 April 2024
15:00

Lousã	21-40	CDUL
Try: 2x Con: 1x Pen: 3x Drop: 0x		Try: 6x Con: 5x Pen: 0x Drop: 0x

Estádio Municipal de Rugby José Redondo

13 April 2024
15:00

CDUP	29-33	São Miguel
Try: 4x Con: 3x Pen: 1x Drop: 0x		Try: 5x Con: 4x Pen: 0x Drop: 0x

Estádio Universitário do Porto

Rest breaks: Académica and Belenenses

=== Round 19 ===
20 April 2024
14:00

Belenenses	24-7	Cascais
Try: 4x Con: x Pen: x Drop: x		Try: 1x Con: x Pen: x Drop: x

Belém Rugby Park
Referee: P.M. Silva

20 April 2024
18:00

Benfica	7-13	Direito
Try: 1x Con: x Pen: x Drop: x		Try: 1x Con: x Pen: x Drop: x

Campo nº2 Lisbon University
Referee: P. Duarte

20 April 2024
15:00

Académica	24-13	Lousã
Try: 3x Con: x Pen: x Drop: x		Try: 1x Con: x Pen: x Drop: x

Estádio Municipal Sérgio Conceição
Referee: M. Minelli

20 April 2024
16:00

São Miguel	17-19	CDUL
Try: 2x Con: x Pen: x Drop: x		Try: 3x Con: x Pen: x Drop: x

Bulldog Rugby Park
Referee: M. Heitor

Rest breaks: Agronomia and CDUP

=== Round 20 ===
27 April 2024
15:00

Direito	33-3	Académica
Try: 5x Con: x Pen: x Drop: x		Try: 0x Con: x Pen: x Drop: x

Complexo Desportivo Miguel Nobre Ferreira

27 April 2024
15:00

CDUL	40-31	Benfica
Try: 6x Con: x Pen: x Drop: x		Try: 4x Con: x Pen: x Drop: x

Estádio Universitário de Lisboa

27 April 2024
15:00

Cascais	68-12	Lousã
Try: 10x Con: x Pen: x Drop: x		Try: 2x Con: x Pen: x Drop: x

Estádio Municipal Dramático Cascais

27 April 2024
15:00

CDUP	12-88	Belenenses
Try: 2x Con: x Pen: x Drop: x		Try: 14x Con: x Pen: x Drop: x

Estádio Universitário do Porto

27 April 2024
15:00

São Miguel	12-54	Agronomia
Try: 2x Con: x Pen: x Drop: x		Try: 8x Con: x Pen: x Drop: x

Bulldog Rugby Park

== Playoffs ==
Following the regular season, the top 6 teams will contest the championship through playoffs. The top 2 teams will start playing in the semi-finals while the others will start in the quarter-finals.

For the first time in Portuguese rugby history, the final will be broadcast on free to air television channel Televisão Independente, as a result of a greater interest in rugby following Portugal's participation in the 2023 Rugby World Cup.

An inquiry was opened as a consequence of the incident with fans on 27 April Direito's match, resulting on the provisional ban of Direito's home ground by at least 8 matches.

Quarterfinals
4	Direito	21
5	Cascais	18
3	Benfica	23
6	CDUL	16

Semifinals
1	Belenenses	24
Direito	13
2	Agronomia	21
Benfica	12

Finals
Belenenses	19
Agronomia	18

=== Quarter-Finals ===
4 May
15:00

Direito	21-18	Cascais
Try: Vareta '23 m Diniz '38 c Con: Vareiro (1/2) 39', Pen: Vareiro (3/4) 11', 48', 72'		Pen: Jara (5/5) 20', 26', 40', 42', 62'; Drop: Jara (1/1) 12'

Complexo Municipal de Atletismo do Vale da Rosa

FB	15	(Portugal) Manuel Vareiro
RW	14	(Portugal) Francisco Nobre
OC	13	(Portugal) José Maria Vareta
IC	12	(Portugal) João Rosa
LW	11	(Portugal) Duarte Portela
FH	10	(Portugal) Jerónimo Portela
SH	9	(Portugal) Afonso Castiñeira
N8	8	(Portugal) Pedro Rosa
OF	7	(Portugal) João Granate
BF	6	(Portugal) João Vital
RL	5	(Portugal) Duarte Torgal
LL	4	(Portugal) Pedro Ferreira
TP	3	(Argentina) Pablo Durán
HK	2	(Portugal) Duarte Diniz (c)
LP	1	(Portugal) David Costa
Substitutions:
PR	16	(New Zealand) Tamatautonu Faitotonu
HK	17	(Portugal) António Peixoto
PR	18	(Portugal) Afonso Tapadinhas
LK	19	(Portugal) Luís Semedo
N8	20	(Portugal) Vasco Fragoso Mendes
SH	21	(Portugal) Duarte Cortes
WG	22	(Portugal) João Vaz Antunes
WG	23	(Portugal) Caetano Castelo Branco
Coach:
(Argentina) Enrique Pichot

FB	15	(Portugal) Alfredo Almeida
RW	14	(Portugal) José Maria Vilar Gomes
OC	13	(Portugal) Francisco Costa Campos
IC	12	(Portugal) António Vidinha
LW	11	(Portugal) Vasco Durão
FH	10	(Argentina) Santiago Jara
SH	9	(Portugal) Duarte Cardoso
N8	8	(Portugal) Francisco Sousa (c)
OF	7	(Portugal) Duarte Costa Campos
BF	6	(Portugal) João Cabaço
RL	5	(Portugal) Martim Bello
LL	4	(Portugal) Manuel Barros
TP	3	(Argentina) Nicolás Griffiths
HK	2	(Portugal) Pedro Santiago Lopes
LP	1	(Argentina) Ignácio Urueña
Substitutions:
PR	16	(Portugal) Duarte Conde
HK	17	(Portugal) Nuno Mascarenhas
PR	18	(Argentina) José Martínez
LK	19	(Portugal) Alexandre Rodrigues
FL	20	(Portugal) Salvador Vassalo
N8	21	(Portugal) Lourenço Durão
SH	22	(England) Noah Nash
FB	23	(Portugal) Vasco Correia
Coach:
(Portugal) Frederico Sousa

5 May
17:00

Benfica	23-16	CDUL

Estádio Universitário de Lisboa

FB	15	(South Africa) Shane van Rooyen
RW	14	(New Zealand) Latrell Ah Kiong
OC	13	(New Zealand) Hayden Hann
IC	12	(Italy) Matteo Colli
LW	11	(Portugal) Diogo Salgado
FH	10	(Portugal) José Rodrigues
SH	9	(Ireland) Elliot Ryan
N8	8	(Portugal) Frederico Couto (c)
OF	7	(Portugal) Tomás Picado
BF	6	(Portugal) Vasco Baptista
RL	5	(New Zealand) Adrian Hall
LL	4	(Brazil) Felipe Rosa
TP	3	(Spain) Gavin van der Berg
HK	2	(South Africa) Jason Cornelius
LP	1	(Brazil) Luan Almeida
Substitutions:
HK	16	(Portugal) Pedro Gouveia
PR	17	(Portugal) Márcio Pinheiro
PR	18	(Portugal) André Antunes
LK	19	(Portugal) Pedro Tavares
FL	20	(South Africa) Lorenzo Palacio
SH	21	(Portugal) António Campos
WG	22	(Portugal) António Valadares
WG	23	(Portugal) Diego Caeiro
Coach:
(New Zealand) Travis Church

FB	15	(Portugal) Jorge Abecassis
RW	14	(Portugal) Fábio Vaz Conceição
OC	13	(Argentina) Ignacio Albornoz
IC	12	(Portugal) Tomás Appleton
LW	11	(Portugal) Sebastião Stilwell
FH	10	(Portugal) Nuno Penha e Costa
SH	9	(Portugal) Francisco Pinto Magalhães (c)
N8	8	(Portugal) José Roque
OF	7	(Portugal) Manuel Fati
BF	6	(Portugal) Francisco Figueiredo
RL	5	(Argentina) Gonzalo Aguiar
LL	4	(Portugal) Francisco Almeida
TP	3	(Brazil) Matheus Rocha
HK	2	(Portugal) Duarte Foro
LP	1	(Argentina) Cristian Zurita
Substitutions:
PR	16	(Portugal) Isaías Camará
HK	17	(Ireland) Charlie Ward
PR	18	(Portugal) Gonçalo Alves
LK	19	(Portugal) Diogo D'Almeida
FL	20	(Portugal) Francisco Appleton
SH	21	(Portugal) Martim Domingues
FH	22	(Portugal) Faustino Gama
CE	23	(Portugal) Bernardo Matos
Coach:
(Argentina) Júlio Farias

=== Semi-Finals ===
11 May
13:00

Belenenses	24-13	Direito

Belém Rugby Park

12 May
15:00

Agronomia	21-12	Benfica

Tapada da Ajuda

=== Final ===
18 May
11:00

Belenenses	19-18	Agronomia
Try: André da Cunha (40+8’); Con: João Freudenthal (40+9’); Pen: João Freudenthal (35’, 46’, 61’ e 80+7’)		Pen: Domingos Cabral (17', 30'), João Lima (25’, 40+3’, 65’ e 78’)

Estádio do Restelo

== Squads 2023/24 ==
Squads are ordered by the last classification of the league. According to Portuguese Rugby Federation

The Direito squad for the 2023–24 TOP 10 season
**Props**: (Portugal) **David Costa**; (Portugal) **António Prim**; (Portugal) **Francisco Bruno**; (Portugal) **José Lupi**; (Argentina) Guillermo Durán; (Portugal) Luis Lopes; (Portugal) Afonso Tapadinhas; (Portugal) Lourenço Moita; **Hookers**: (Portugal) **Duarte Diniz**; (Portugal) Afonso Bento; **Locks**: (Portugal) **Duarte Torgal**; (Portugal) **Rui D'Orey**; (Portugal) João Vital; (Portugal) António Peixoto; (Portugal) Guilherme Valente; (Portugal) Pedro Ferreira; (Portugal) Luis Semedo; (Portugal) Henrique Cortes; (Portugal) Duarte Pedro Nunes	**Backrow**: (Portugal) **Manuel Picão**; (Portugal) **João Granate**; (Portugal) **Vasco Fragoso Mendes**; (Portugal) **Pedro Afra Rosa**; (Portugal) Nuno Peixoto; (New Zealand) Tama Faitotonu; (Portugal) Mateus Ferreira; (Portugal) Sebastião Silva; (Portugal) Diogo Matos; (Portugal) Miguel Romero Rodrigues; (Portugal) Luis Pina; **Scrum-halves**: (Portugal) **João Dias**; (Portugal) **Manuel Queirós**; (Portugal) António Amaral; (Portugal) Duarte Cortes; (Portugal) Afonso Castiñeira; **Fly-halves**: (Portugal) **Jerónimo Portela**; (Portugal) **Frederico Filipe**; (Portugal) Manuel Vareiro	**Centres**: (Portugal) **José Maria Vareta**; (Portugal) Francisco Nobre; (Portugal) João Afra Rosa; (Portugal) Tomás Cary; **Wingers**: (Portugal) João Vaz Antunes; (Portugal) Duarte Portela; (Portugal) Duarte Matos; (Portugal) Diogo Custódio; (Portugal) João Burnay; (Portugal) Francisco Pinto; **Fullbacks**: (Portugal) **Manuel Vilela Pereira**; (Portugal) João Maria Silva; (Portugal) Francisco Perloiro; (Portugal) Frederico Roquette
(c) denotes the team captain, **Bold** denotes internationally capped players.^{*} denotes players qualified to play for Portugal on residency or dual nationality.

The Cascais squad for the 2023–24 TOP 10 season
**Props**: (Portugal) **Nuno Mascarenhas**; (Brazil) **Pedro Bengaló**; (Argentina) Ignácio Urueña; (Argentina) Nicolas Griffiths; (Portugal) José Lavos; (Portugal) Duarte Conde; (Portugal) Pedro Lopes; **Hookers**: (Portugal) Santiago Lopes; (Argentina) José Martinez; (England) Joseph Duffy; (Portugal) Bernardo Gomes; (Portugal) Alexander Vieira; **Locks**: (Portugal) **Martim Belo**; (Portugal) Alexandre Fonseca Rodrigues; (Portugal) Manuel Barros; (Portugal) Gustavo Freire; (Portugal) António Carvalho Martins; (Portugal) Luis Graça; (Portugal) João Cabaço	**Backrow**: (Argentina) **Gonzalo Paulin**; (Portugal) **Salvador Vassalo**; (Portugal) **Duarte Costa Campos**; (Portugal) **Boaventura Almeida**; (Portugal) **Francisco Sousa**; (Portugal) Sebastião Petronilho; (Portugal) Gonçalo Carvalho; (Portugal) Diogo Pina; (Portugal) Lourenço Durão; **Scrum-halves**: (England) Noah Nash; (Portugal) Duarte Cardoso; (Portugal) Domingos Albuquerque; (Portugal) Francisco Carmona e Costa; **Fly-halves**: (Argentina) **Gabriel Ascárate**; (Argentina) Santiago Jara	**Centres**: (Romania) **Gabriel Pop***; (Portugal) **António Vidinha**; (Portugal) Francisco C. Campos; **Wingers**: (Portugal) Vasco Durão; (Portugal) José Villar Gomes; (Portugal) António Sousa; (Portugal) Francisco Pissarra; (Portugal) Duarte Tavares; **Fullbacks**: (Portugal) Vasco Correia; (Portugal) Alfredo Almeida
(c) denotes the team captain, **Bold** denotes internationally capped players.^{*} denotes players qualified to play for Portugal on residency or dual nationality.

The Agronomia squad for the 2023–24 TOP 10 season
**Props**: (Georgia (country)) Giorgi Turabelidze*; (Argentina) Luis Carranza; (Portugal) Francisco Domingues; (Portugal) Gil Buchinho; (Portugal) Nicolau Turabelidze; **Hookers**: (Portugal) **Pedro Vicente**; (Argentina) José Nicolás Gea; (Argentina) Mariano Muntaner; (Portugal) Frederico Tenório; (Portugal) Bernardo Cardoso; **Locks**: (Portugal) **José Rebelo de Andrade**; (Portugal) Pedro Herédia; (Portugal) António Maria Andrade; (Portugal) Bernardo B. Cardoso; (Portugal) António Rebelo de Andrade	**Backrow**: (Netherlands) **Wolf Van Djick**; (New Zealand) Xavier Mccorkindale; (Portugal) Francisco Cabral; (Portugal) Manuel Navalhinhas; (Portugal) Francisco Uva; (Portugal) Diogo Sarmento; (Portugal) Vicente Pinto; **Scrum-halves**: (Chile) **Nicolas Herreros**; (Portugal) João Bandeiras; **Fly-halves**: (Belgium) **Hugo de Franq**; (Portugal) **Domingos Cabral**; (Portugal) **João Lima**; (New Zealand) Kane Hancy	**Centres**: (Portugal) **José Lima**; (Portugal) **Vasco Ribeiro**; (Portugal) Vasco Leite; (Portugal) Sebastião Cardoso; (Portugal) José Câmara; **Wingers**: (Portugal) **António Cortes**; (Portugal) José Cortes Pena Monteiro; (Portugal) António Pena Monteiro; (Portugal) Pedro Ribeiro; (Portugal) Rodrigo Castanheira; **Fullbacks**: (Portugal) **Manuel Cardoso Pinto**; (Portugal) Afonso Vinagre; (Portugal) Gonçalo Vasco Costa
(c) denotes the team captain, **Bold** denotes internationally capped players.^{*} denotes players qualified to play for Portugal on residency or dual nationality.

The Benfica squad for the 2023–24 TOP 10 season
**Props**: (Spain) **Gavin Van den Berg**; (Portugal) **Hugo Valente**; (South Africa) Barend Bezuidenhout; (New Zealand) Meli Sifa; (Portugal) Márcio Pinheiro; (Portugal) André Antunes; **Hookers**: (Brazil) **Luan Almeida**; (South Africa) Jason Cornelius; (Portugal) Pedro Gouveia; **Locks**: (Brazil) **Felipe Rosa**; (New Zealand) Adrian Hall; (South Africa) Jaden Delport; (Argentina) Fidel Vidal*	**Backrow**: (Portugal) **Vasco Baptista**; (Portugal) **Frederico Couto**; (South Africa) Lorenzo Palacio*; (Portugal) Frederico Silva; (Portugal) Tomás Picado; (Portugal) Pedro Ismael Tavares; **Scrum-halves**: (Ireland) Elliott Ryan; (Portugal) Francisco Russo; (Portugal) António Campos; (Portugal) Tomás Boavida; **Fly-halves**: (Portugal) **José Rodrigues**	**Centres**: (New Zealand) Hayden Hann; (Italy) Matteo Colli; (Portugal) Francisco Bessa; (Portugal) Diogo Salgado; **Wingers**: (New Zealand) Latrell Ah Kiong; (Portugal) José Miguel Carvalho; (Portugal) Harrison Stock; (Portugal) António Valadares; (Portugal) Diego Caeiro; (Portugal) Rodrigo Sampaio; (Guinea-Bissau) Felisbelo Vieira*; (France) Noah Ménard; **Fullbacks**: (South Africa) Shane Van Rooyen
(c) denotes the team captain, **Bold** denotes internationally capped players.^{*} denotes players qualified to play for Portugal on residency or dual nationality.

The Belenenses squad for the 2023–24 TOP 10 season
**Props**: (Czech Republic) **Anthony Kent**; (Spain) **Joaquin Dominguez**; (Portugal) **António Machado dos Santos**; (Portugal) **Frederico Simões**; (Portugal) **Manuel Worm**; (Tonga) Israel Otunuku; **Hookers**: (Argentina) Guillermo Lawrie; (Portugal) Miguel Nunes; **Locks**: (Portugal) **Salvador da Cunha**; (Portugal) **Manuel Lima**; (Portugal) José Moreira; (Portugal) Francisco Simões; (Portugal) António Andrade; (Portugal) Tomás da Cunha	**Backrow**: (Portugal) **Rafael Simões**; (Portugal) **David Wallis**; (Portugal) **Manuel Pinto**; (Portugal) André Cunha; (Portugal) Pedro Cunha; (Portugal) Tomás Sequeira; (Portugal) Sebastião da Cunha; (Portugal) Diogo Raposo; **Scrum-halves**: (Portugal) **Duarte Azevedo**; **Fly-halves**: (Portugal) **Francisco Menéres**; (Portugal) **Manuel Menéres**; (Portugal) **João Freudenthal**	**Centres**: (Portugal) **José Paiva dos Santos**; (Portugal) **Rodrigo Fruedenthal**; (New Zealand) Alex Thrupp; (Portugal) Lourenço Pedras; (Portugal) António Cunha; (Portugal) António Claro; **Wingers**: (Portugal) **Diogo Rodrigues**; (Portugal) **Duarte Moreira**; (Wales) Owen Jenkins; (Portugal) Francisco Galveias; (Portugal) Lourenço Pedras; **Fullbacks**: (Portugal) **Manuel Marta**; (Portugal) Francisco Murta; (Portugal) Salvador da Cunha Jr.
(c) denotes the team captain, **Bold** denotes internationally capped players.^{*} denotes players qualified to play for Portugal on residency or dual nationality.

The CDUL squad for the 2023–24 TOP 10 season
**Props**: (Brazil) **Matheus Rocha**; (Argentina) Cristian Zurita; (Portugal) Gonçalo Madaleno; (Portugal) José Almeida; (Portugal) Gonçalo Alves; (Portugal) Manuel Magriço; **Hookers**: (Portugal) Duarte Foro; (Portugal) Francisco Pedro; (Portugal) Isaías Camará; (Portugal) Samuel Marques; **Locks**: (Argentina) Gonzalo Aguiar; (Portugal) Francisco Almeida; (Portugal) António Stilwell; (Portugal) Diogo D'Almeida	**Backrow**: (Portugal) **Sebastião Villax**; (Portugal) **Xavier Cerejo**; (Portugal) **José Roque**; (Portugal) Manuel Fati; (Portugal) Eduardo Queiroz; (Portugal) Rodrigo Oliveira; (Portugal) Francisco Figueiredo; (Portugal) José Libano Monteiro; **Scrum-halves**: (Portugal) **Francisco Magalhães**; (France) Reymond Dorian; (Portugal) Martim Domingues; **Fly-halves**: (Portugal) **Jorge Abecasis**; (Portugal) Nuno Penha Costa; (Portugal) Pedro Neiva; (Portugal) Pedro Anahory; (Portugal) Lourenço Cardoso; (Portugal) Faustino Gama	**Centres**: (Portugal) **Tomás Appleton**; (Portugal) **Francisco Appleton**; (Argentina) Ignacio Albornoz; (Portugal) Nuno Macedo; (Portugal) Bernardo Matos; (Portugal) Guilherme Vasconcelos; (Portugal) Martim Faro; (Portugal) Francisco Teiga Vieira; (Portugal) Afonso Alvarez; **Wingers**: (Portugal) **Fabio Conceiçao**; (Portugal) Tomás Noronha; (Portugal) Bernardo Canas; (Portugal) Hussein Sacoor; (Portugal) Tomás Passaro; (Portugal) João Cardoso; **Fullbacks**: (New Zealand) Sam Aitken; (Portugal) Manuel Salgado; (Portugal) Diogo Cardoso; (Portugal) Sebastião Stilwell
(c) denotes the team captain, **Bold** denotes internationally capped players.^{*} denotes players qualified to play for Portugal on residency or dual nationality.

The RC Lousã squad for the 2023–24 TOP 10 season
**Props**: (Argentina) Fermin Conti; (France) Mathieu Lopes*; (Uruguay) Gabriel Blanco; (Brazil) João Henrique Santos; (South Africa) Marco Nortje; (Portugal) Bruno Pereira; **Hookers**: (England) Josh Gatt; **Locks**: (Brazil) **Kauã Guimarães**; (Portugal) Bruno Pinheiro; (Portugal) Bruno Santos; (Portugal) Diogo Forte	**Backrow**: (Portugal) Ricardo Reis; (Argentina) Exequiel Chedid; (Portugal) João Francisco dos Santos; (Portugal) Henrique Batista; (Portugal) João Barreto; (Portugal) Diogo Graça; **Scrum-halves**: (Ireland) Cirian Roberts; (Portugal) Pedro Dias dos Santos; **Fly-halves**: (Argentina) Thomas Guzman; (Argentina) Juan Agustín Graciarena	**Centres**: (Portugal) Daniel Lopes; (Portugal) João Campos; **Wingers**: (Argentina) Facundo Lopes; (Argentina) Giuliano Franchi; (South Africa) Cristiaan Brandt; (Portugal) Francisco Caetano; (Portugal) Gonçalo Graça; **Fullbacks**: (Portugal) Manuel Nogueira; (Portugal) Rui Freitas
(c) denotes the team captain, **Bold** denotes internationally capped players.^{*} denotes players qualified to play for Portugal on residency or dual nationality.

The São Miguel squad for the 2023–24 TOP 10 season
**Props**: (Fiji) **Robert Delai**; (Argentina) José Santucho; (Argentina) Giovanni Ramallo; (South Africa) Juninho Patricio; (United States) Jayson Jackson; (Portugal) Tiago Quitério; **Hookers**: (Portugal) Miguel Seoane; (Portugal) Banana; **Locks**: (Portugal) Pedro Oliveira; (Portugal) Volodymyr Grikh; (Portugal) Francisco Silva; (Portugal) Simão Oliveira; (Portugal) Miguel Máximo; (Portugal) Simão Medeiro	**Backrow**: (South Africa) Sabata Mokhachane; (Portugal) Gonçalo Melo; (Portugal) Miguel Orrico; (Portugal) Tommy; (Portugal) Duarte Carolino; (Portugal) Diogo Pina; (Portugal) Rui Duarte; **Scrum-halves**: (Portugal) Tomás Trincheiras; (Portugal) Carlos; (Portugal) Mike; **Fly-halves**: (South Africa) Danny Mokhoabane; (South Africa) Bader Pretorius; (Portugal) Francisco Teixeira	**Centres**: (South Africa) Charles Goedhals; (Portugal) Rivaldo Pinto; (Portugal) Tomás Morais; (Portugal) Lourenço Chambel; **Wingers**: (Zimbabwe) Bright Matimba; (Portugal) Ricardo Rosa; (Portugal) Francisco Cardoso; (Portugal) Francisco Reis; (Portugal) Tomás Aquino; **Fullbacks**: (Italy) Andrea Ragno; (Portugal) Duarte Branquinho; (Portugal) José Nascimento
(c) denotes the team captain, **Bold** denotes internationally capped players.^{*} denotes players qualified to play for Portugal on residency or dual nationality.

The CDUP squad for the 2023–24 TOP 10 season
**Props**: (Portugal) **Filipe Granja**; (Argentina) Gonzalo Vidal; (Portugal) Bernardo Coelho; (Portugal) Diogo Amaro; **Hookers**: (Portugal) Nuno Figueiredo; (Portugal) António Terroso; **Locks**: (Portugal) Gonçalo Seruca; (Portugal) Tiago Albuquerque; (Portugal) Francisco Bastos; (Portugal) Luis Moreira; (Portugal) Henrique Vieira; (Portugal) Gonçalo Santos; (Portugal) Afonso Santos	**Backrow**: (Argentina) Facundo Ojeda; (Portugal) Pedro Cálem; (Portugal) João Duarte; (Portugal) Luis Leão; (Portugal) Henrique Santos; (Portugal) Vasco Sarmento; (Portugal) Tomás Pereira; **Scrum-halves**: (Portugal) **João Belo**; (Portugal) Manuel Mendonça; **Fly-halves**: (Portugal) Tiago Rocha; (Portugal) Luis Agrelos; (Portugal) Bernardo Nogueira	**Centres**: (Portugal) Tomás Marrana; (Portugal) Miguel Trepa; (Portugal) Guilherme Brandão; (Portugal) Eduardo Moreira; **Wingers**: (Argentina) Rodrigo Gauna; (Portugal) Salvador Cardoso; (Portugal) Lucas Velo; (Portugal) Afonso Aguiar; (Portugal) José Diogo; **Fullbacks**: (Portugal) **Nuno Sousa Guedes**; (Portugal) Sebastião Leite; (Portugal) Nuno Maia
(c) denotes the team captain, **Bold** denotes internationally capped players.^{*} denotes players qualified to play for Portugal on residency or dual nationality.

The Académica squad for the 2023–24 TOP 10 season
**Props**: (Brazil) **Alexandre Alves**; (South Africa) Mzo Buthelezi; (Portugal) André Gonçalves; (Portugal) Afonso Machado; (Portugal) João Claúdio Dos Santos; **Hookers**: (Portugal) **João Mateus**; (Argentina) Santiago Bonavento; (Portugal) João Aguiar; (Portugal) Guilherme Coelho; **Locks**: (Brazil) **Matheus Wolf**; (Brazil) **Diogo Paixão Santos**; (Portugal) **Sérgio Duarte Franco**; (Brazil) Artur Lima; (Portugal) Gonçalo Costa; (Portugal) Daniel Almeida; (Portugal) Rafael Espirito Santo	**Backrow**: (South Africa) Ntokozo Vidima; (Argentina) Genaro Fissore; (Portugal) João Tavares; (Portugal) Edmundo Ferreira; (Portugal) Francisco Curica; (Portugal) Antonio Salgueiro; (Portugal) Gonçalo Breda; (Portugal) Miguel André; **Scrum-halves**: (Argentina) Tomás Cornejo; (Portugal) Silvio Costa; **Fly-halves**: (Argentina) Geronimo Boccazzi; (Australia) Blake Rixon	**Centres**: (Brazil) **Moisés Duque**; (Australia) Marcus Arrindell; (Portugal) Francisco Migueis; (Portugal) Gonçalo Ramos; **Wingers**: (Portugal) **João Diogo Silva**; (Portugal) João Dinis; (Portugal) Rodrigo Barradas; (Portugal) Afonso Monteiro; (Portugal) João Cunha; (Portugal) António Costa; **Fullbacks**: (Portugal) Nuno Cardoso; (Portugal) Joaquim Couto; (Portugal) Tiago Pintão
(c) denotes the team captain, **Bold** denotes internationally capped players.^{*} denotes players qualified to play for Portugal on residency or dual nationality.

== See also ==
- 2023–24 Premiership Rugby
- 2023–24 Top 14 season
- 2023–24 Rugby Pro D2 season
- 2023–24 European Rugby Champions Cup
- 2023–24 EPCR Challenge Cup
- 2023–24 Premiership Rugby Cup
- 2023–24 RFU Championship
- 2023–24 United Rugby Championship
