= Lousã e Vilarinho =

- Civil parish
- Location in Portugal
- Coordinates: 40.113°N 8.2495°W
- Country: Portugal
- Region: Centro
- Intermunic. comm.: Região de Coimbra
- District: Coimbra
- Municipality: Lousã
- Disbanded: 2025

Area
  - Total: 72.40 km^{2} (27.95 sq mi)

Population (2011)
  - Total: 13,056
  - Density: 180.3/km^{2} (467.1/sq mi)
- Time zone: UTC+00:00 (WET)
  - Summer (DST): UTC+01:00 (WEST)

Lousã e Vilarinho was a civil parish in the municipality of Lousã, Portugal. It was formed in 2013 by the merger of the former parishes Lousã and Vilarinho. The population in 2011 was 13,056, in an area of 72.40 km². It was dissolved in 2025.
