= Casal do Abade =

Village in Portugal

Coordinates: 40.321°N 7.972°W

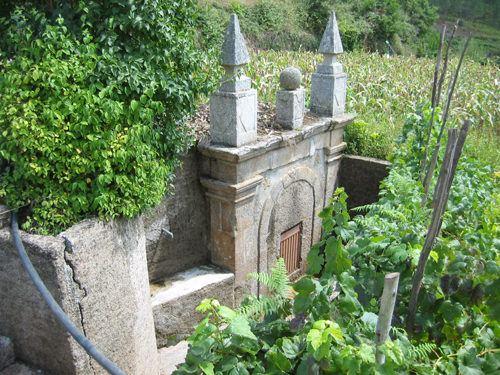
The Roman Fonte Velha in Casal do Abade, Portugal. Photo 2008.

Casal do Abade is a small village located near the border between Tábua and Oliveira do Hospital, Portugal. Casal do Abade has around 100 inhabitants. The main place of interest is Fonte Velha (Old Fountain), built by Romans.
