= Coiço =

Coordinates: 40°18′N 8°15′W

Coiço is situated in Penacova, Baixo Mondego, Centre Portugal. Coiço is integrated in the council of Penacova.

== Economy ==
As 70% of the council's area is covered by forest its major source of income is forestry with the development of species such as eucalyptus and acacia. Agriculture and cattle breeding are also important economic activities. Cereals, potatoes, corn, vegetables, kiwis, red fruits and mushrooms are some of the products the region produces. The wine and olive oil tradition are also part of the culture, which reflects in gastronomy.

== Gastronomy ==
The main dishes use these two ingredients abundantly: chanfana, lamprey rice, yellow knight mushroom rice, sarrabulho rice - a stew made of curdled blood of a pig and fressura rice. Biking, hiking and kayaking are some of the experiences that will allow to enjoy the scenery and have a picnic on one of the many river beaches.

== Village Party ==
Coiço's celebrates the 13th of June – pt:Santo António de Lisboa's day, and it is usually done with a big party organized by the entire village, where one can eat, drink and dance all night long.
