= Penacova =

- Municipality
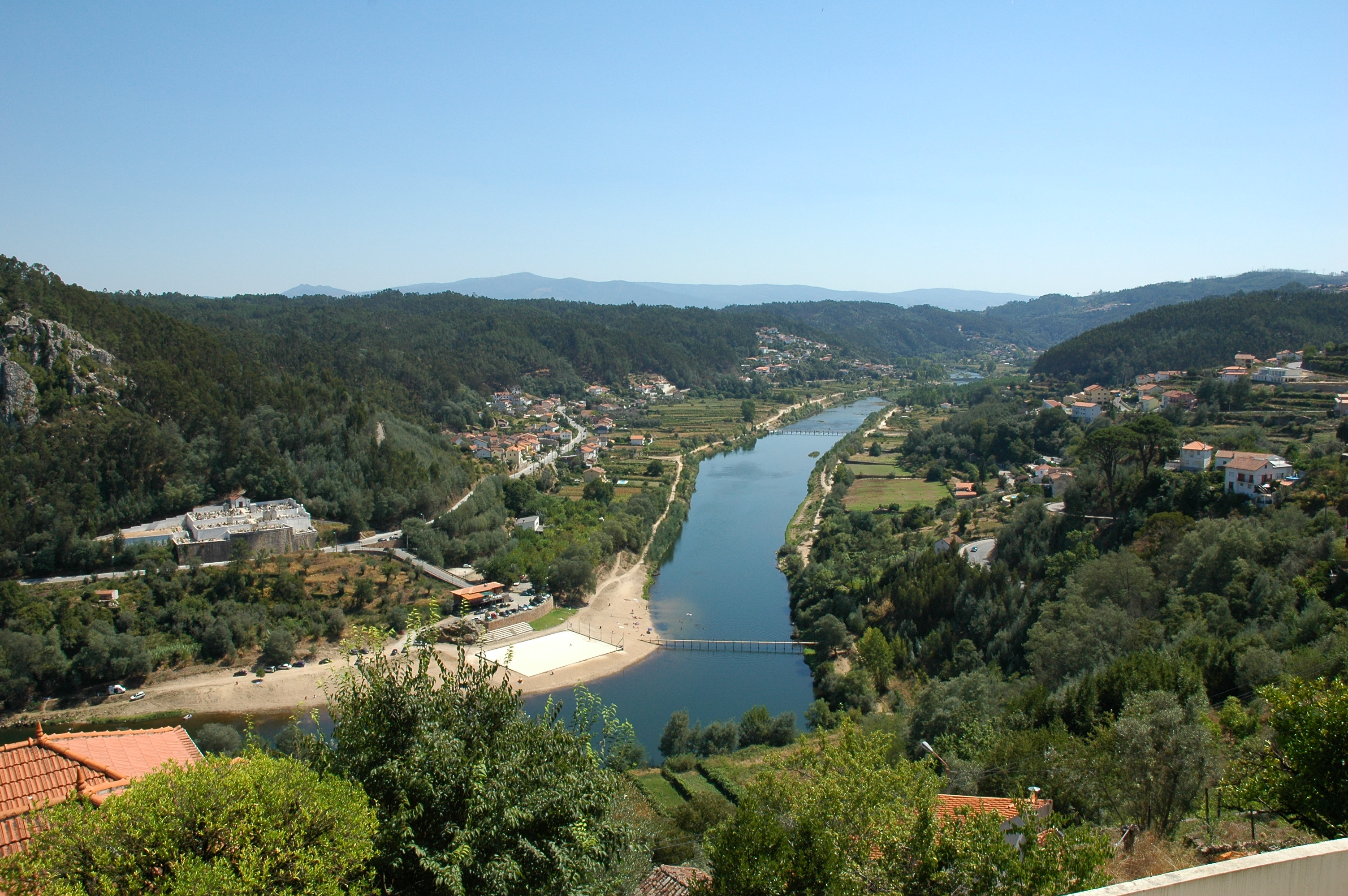
- View of Penacova

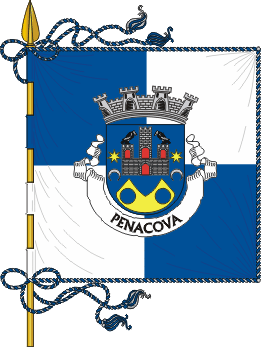
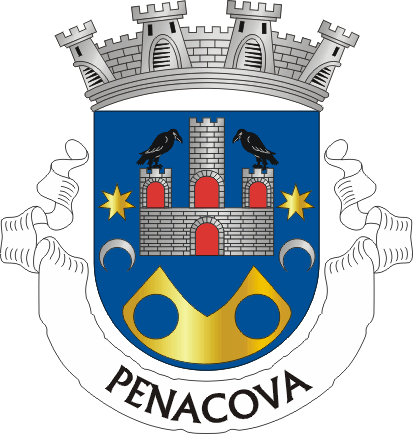
- Flag Coat of arms
- Interactive map of Penacova
- Coordinates: 40°16′14″N 8°17′00″W
- Country: Portugal
- Region: Centro
- Intermunic. comm.: Região de Coimbra
- District: Coimbra

Government
  - President: Humberto José Baptista Oliveira

Area
  - Total: 216.73 km^{2} (83.68 sq mi)

Population (2011)
  - Total: 15,251
  - Density: 70.369/km^{2} (182.25/sq mi)
- Time zone: UTC+00:00 (WET)
  - Summer (DST): UTC+01:00 (WEST)
- Website: www.cm-penacova.pt/

Penacova (Portuguese pronunciation: [pɨnɐˈkɔvɐ] or [ˌpen-]) is a town and a municipality in the Coimbra District, in Portugal. The population in 2011 was 15,251, in an area of 216.73 km^{2}.

== Parishes ==
Administratively, the municipality is divided into 8 civil parishes (freguesias):

- Carvalho
- Figueira de Lorvão
- Friúmes e Paradela
- Lorvão
- Oliveira do Mondego e Travanca do Mondego
- Penacova
- São Pedro de Alva e São Paio do Mondego
- Sazes do Lorvão

== Demographics ==
População do concelho de Penacova (1801–2011)

Year	Pop.	±%
1801	8,706	—
1849	8,593	−1.3%
1900	18,253	+112.4%
1930	16,964	−7.1%
1960	18,704	+10.3%

Year	Pop.	±%
1981	17,351	−7.2%
1991	16,748	−3.5%
2001	16,725	−0.1%
2004	16,850	+0.7%
2011	15,251	−9.5%

== Notable people ==
- António José de Almeida (1866 in Penacova, São Pedro de Alva – 1929) a politician, the sixth President of Portugal, 1919 until 1923.
