= Lousã =

- Municipality
- Town of Lousã
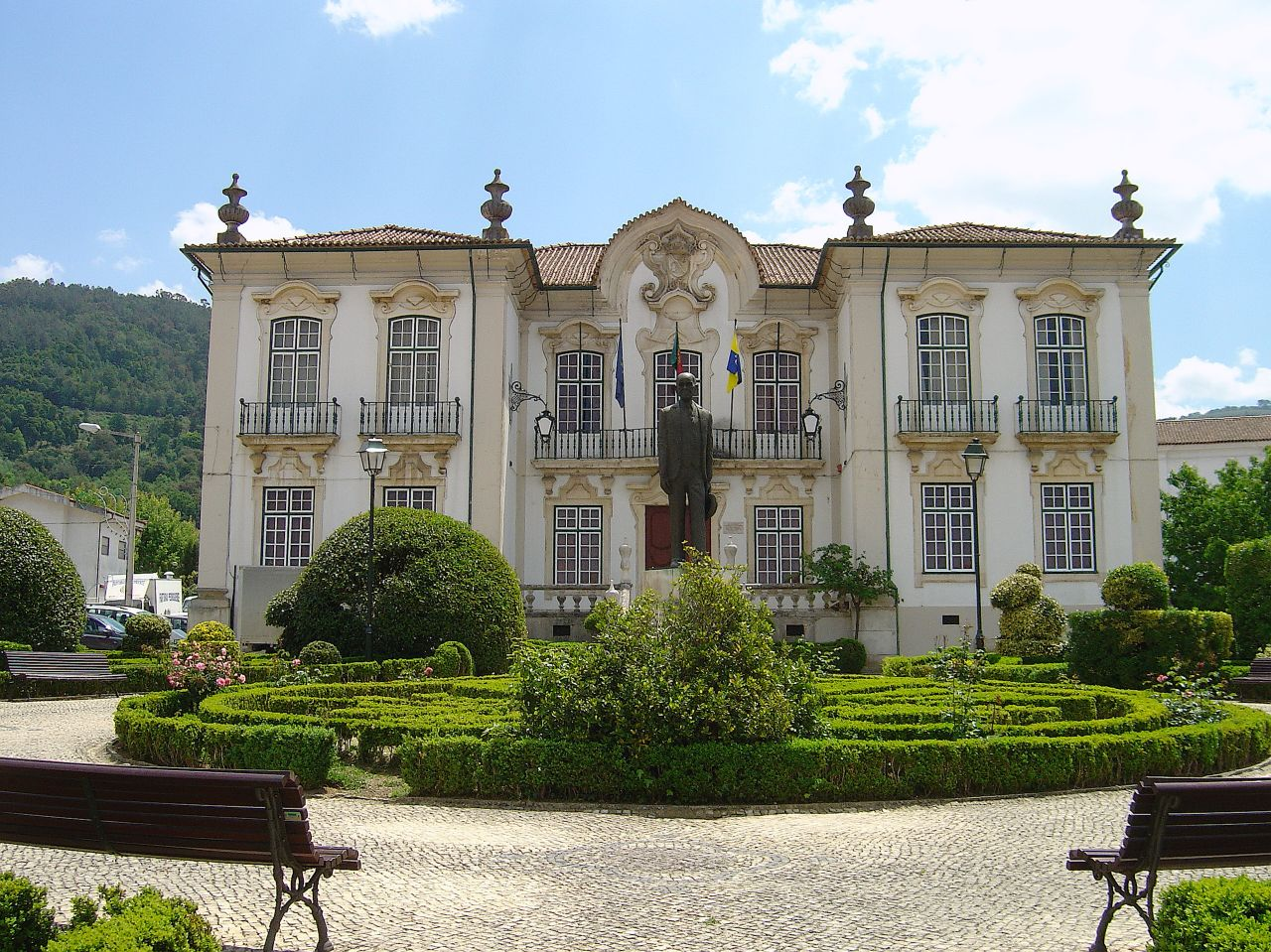
- The Neobaroque-style municipal hall

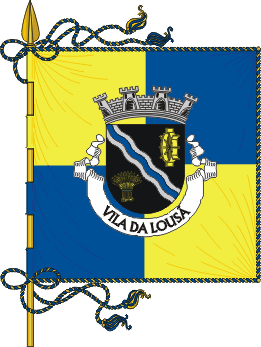
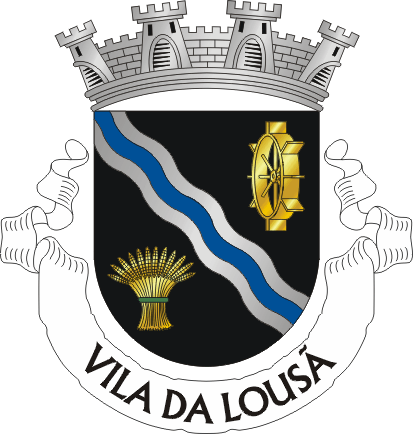
- Flag Coat of arms
- Interactive map of Lousã
- Location in Portugal
- Coordinates: 40°7′N 8°15′W
- Country: Portugal
- Region: Centro
- Intermunic. comm.: Região de Coimbra
- District: Coimbra
- Parishes: 4

Government
  - President: Luis Antunes (PS)

Area
  - Total: 138.40 km^{2} (53.44 sq mi)

Population (2011)
  - Total: 17,604
  - Density: 127.20/km^{2} (329.44/sq mi)
- Time zone: UTC+00:00 (WET)
  - Summer (DST): UTC+01:00 (WEST)
- Postal code: 3200
- Area code: 239
- Patron: São Silvestre
- Website: http://www.cm-lousa.pt/

Lousã (European Portuguese pronunciation: [loˈzɐ̃]), officially the Town of Lousã (Portuguese: Vila da Lousã), is a town and municipality in the district of Coimbra, in the central part of Portugal. The population in 2011 was 17,604, in an area of 138.40 km^{2}.

== History ==
The oldest evidence provides an indication of a human presence in this territory from the Roman occupation of the Iberian peninsula. Examples of this include the funerary pyres, rooftops, tile, glass utensils, coins and the remains of the roadways, in various points within the municipality, including the urban perimeter of Lousã and Serpins. In addition, in the valley and Serra de Ceira, there are vestiges of important gold exploration attempts.

With the invasion of the Germanic people, Imperial Rome fragmented, and many of the colonies dispersed, resulting in a loss of information for this period. But, in 943, there was a contract between Zuleima Abaiud and the abbey Mestúlio in the Monastery of Lorvão where the toponymic name Arauz appeared for the first time to designate the central place in this region, which is near a granite wall that later became the point where the Castle of Arouce was constructed. Coimbra, at the time, was the central place in the Mozarab culture, which was rich due to its economic activity, resulting in a diffusion of settlements to the north of Portugal.

Only with the pacification of the Mondego valley in the 9th century, allowed the development of Lousã basin. It was Sisnando Davides who was responsible for the conquest of the territory, and reorganization of the territory, which included the reconstruction of the various castles, such as in Coimbra, Montemor-o-Velho, Penela, Pencova and Lousã/Arouce. Legend suggests that Lousã was founded by an emir, named Arunce, who wanted to protect his daughter Peralta, while he was away on campaigns in Northern Africa.

The Counts of Lousã, descendants of a Portuguese conqueror, António Correia, whose coat-of-arms is decorated with a depiction of the severed head of King Muqrin, the last Jabrid ruler of Bahrain, was killed by Correia in battle.

=== Kingdom ===
The territory of Arouce, whose castle was already mentioned in the Foral of Miranda do Corvo (1136), and contemplated by King Afonso I, who issued a foral in 1151. In another regal document, dated 1160, there is a reference to a "Lousã" that was independent of Arouce, much like Vilarinho (noting the distinct realities of the sites). A license was issued by King John III, on 23 May 1537, to the residents of Lousã to hold a Bodo de São João.

During the Middle Ages, Lousã continued to prosper and, like many other lands in the kingdom, its old foral was confirmed by King Afonso II, installing a group of rules, privileges and rights, that were later revoked in 1513. On 25 October, of the same year, a new charter was issued by King Manuel I.

It was in the 18th century, that Lousã transformed from modest village to a town, with roads lined with new edifices, housing the Portuguese nobility. With the creation of the paper industry, the Engenho de Papel do Penedo, produced goods of exquisite quality that, in 1716, it received the (then) prestigious typographic seal of the Society of Jesus of Coimbra, later followed by the Tipografia Académica, founded by the Marquis of Pombal and the Casa da Moeda. Other companies would install themselves with the municipality's borders. In 1868, the Fábrica do Boque was founded in Serpins, it operated the first machine to produce continuous paper in Portugal at the time. The Fábrica do Casal de Ermio, which operated between 1853 and 1890, later acquired by the Fábrica do Penedo and transformed into a power plant. Other industries provided wiring, namely the Foz de Arouce and produced energy. Mills, liqueurs, saw-milling, carpentry and other diverse industries, allowed the municipality to transform from agricultural to manufacturing services.

=== Peninsular War ===
It was not until the third French invasion during the Peninsular War (at the beginning of the 19th century), that the region suffered, during the retreat of General Masséna, in March 1811. Escaping along the Almeida road, the royal road that linked the Kingdom to Spain, and passed through settlements in Miranda do Corvo, Foz de Arouce and Ponte da Mucela, Masséna's men attempted to recuperate their interventions in the Kingdom. The French troops pillaged the many villages along their route, extending along the roads to Arneiro and Lousã, as well as several places along the Serra, where they sacked homes, barns and churches, attempting to steal the wealth of the country.

From Lousã these troops stripped the silver from the parochial church, namely the rich bunk and chest, that Father Cáceres had donated to the temple in the 16th century, in addition to other items.

In order to make their escape, French troops were forced to cross the Ceira River, at the small bridge of Foz de Arouce. This narrow channel slowed their escape, allowing the Anglo-Portuguese Army to catch-up to them, constituting a major blow to the enemy.

=== Republic ===
For a long time, Serpins constituted its own autonomous municipality, while Lousã included the localities of Semide, Rio de Vide and, even, Miranda do Corvo. The old town includes several roads, surrounding the old square and (now) disappeared parochial church, municipal hall and tribunal, namely the streets Rua da Viscondessa do Espinhal, Rua das Forças Armadas and Rua Nova, where many of the towns Baroque-era solars are situated. The Misericórdia and other edifices of public interest, including the unattached Casal do Rio, with its palace and surrounding homes.

It is practically at the end of the 19th century that Lousã began to expand beyond its 17th century arteries, resulting in new buildings and collective structures: the hospital (which began operating in 1888); the new parochial church (also at the end of the century); the public slaughterhouse (in 1893); and the old theater, amongst others.

Emigration, that included immigration to Lisbon, began to Brazil at the end of the 19th century, progressing later to the United States and then Europe.

The inauguration of the railway in 1906, broke the region's isolation, which was complemented by the construction of several roadways. In 1924, the first electric lighting of the municipality was completed.

In the final decades of the 20th century, the area occupied by the town doubled, gained new territory and constructing modern neighborhoods, with primary and secondary schools, a fire station and new palace of justice. Apart from these modern facades, the old town still remains, with many of the older buildings, with their ornate windows and elaborated frames and cornices.

== Geography ==
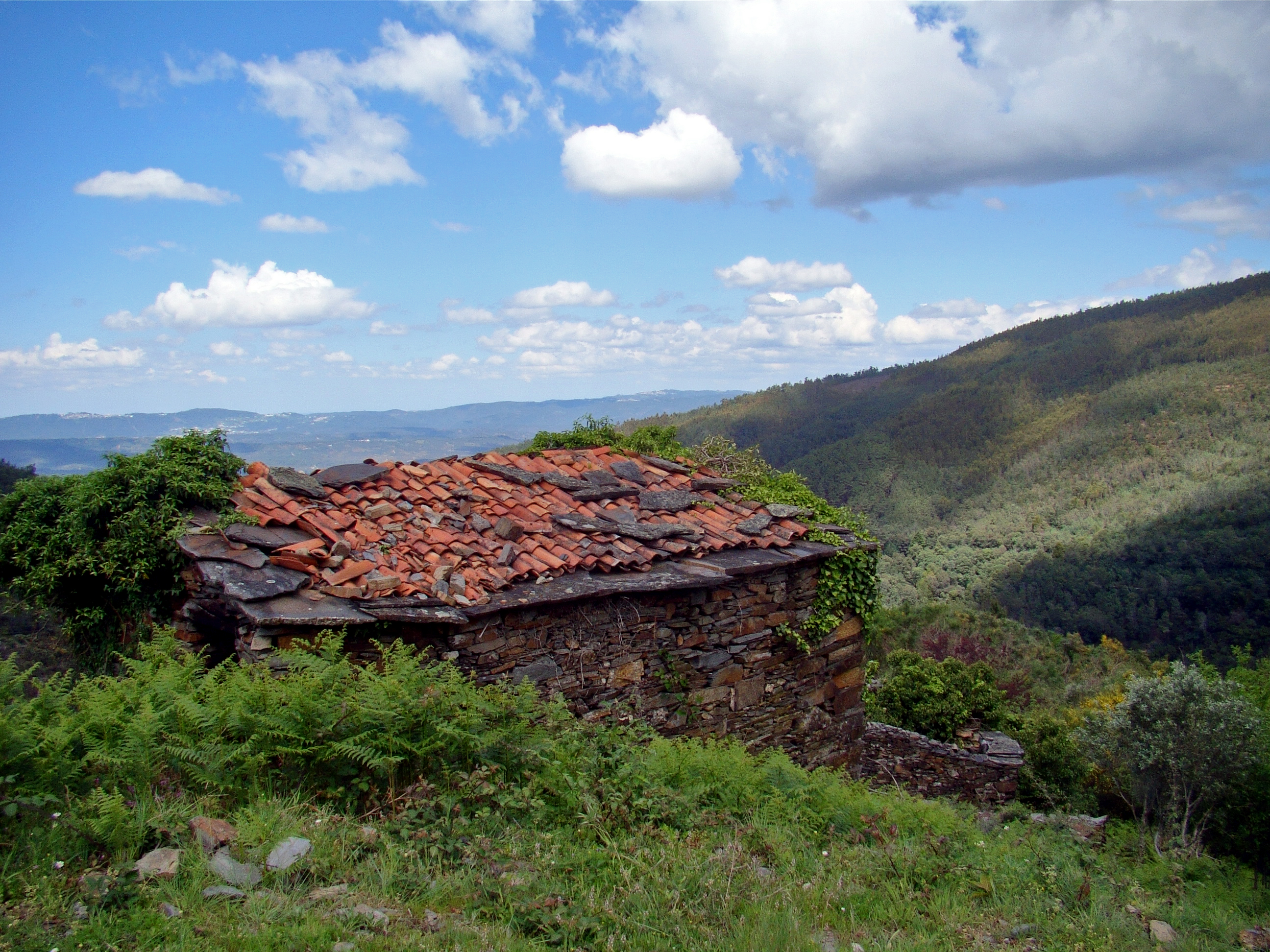
An abandoned building in the villages of the Serra da Lousã

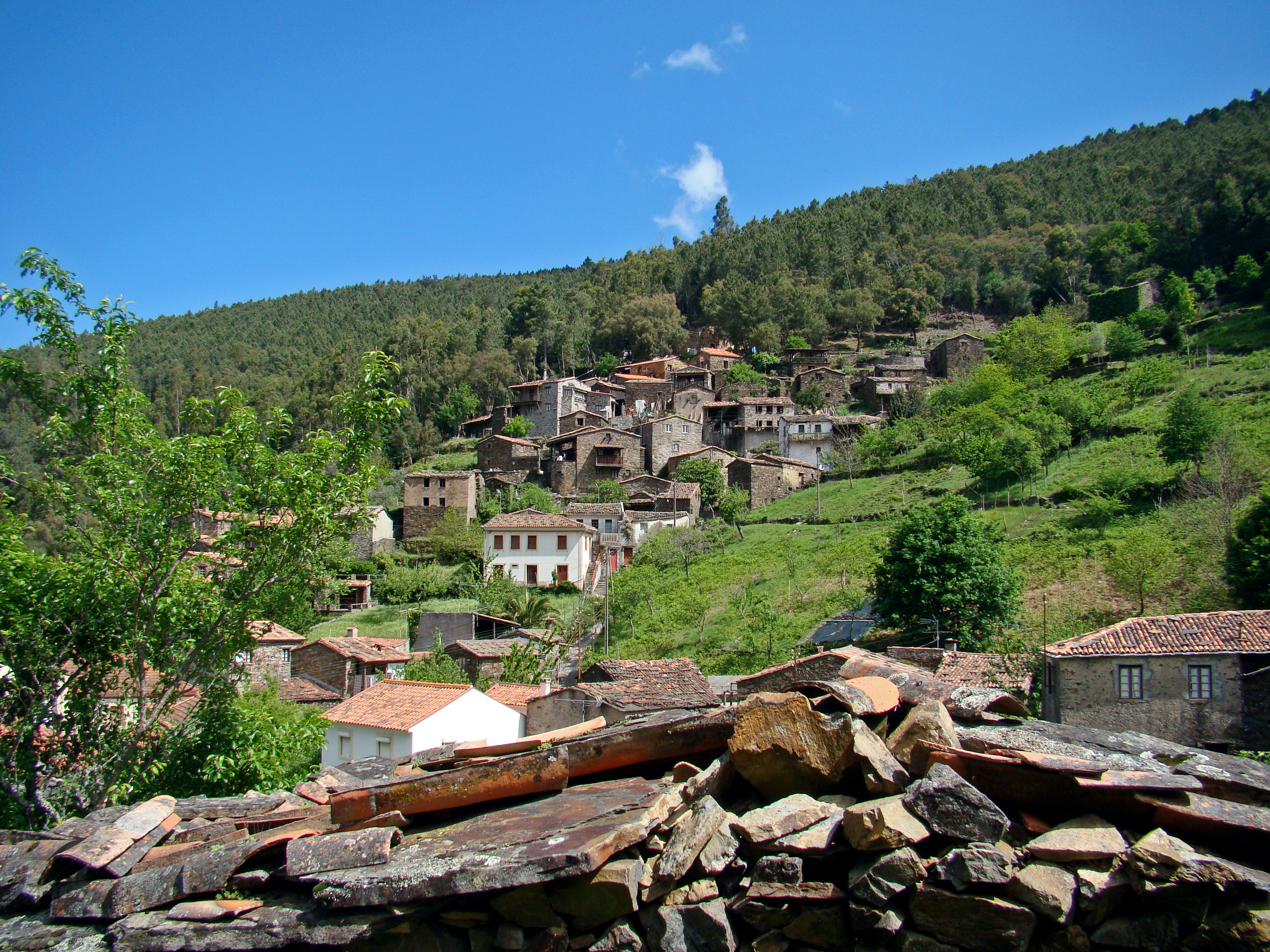
One of the villages of the Serra with many built from schist stone

Population of Lousã (1801 - 2011)
Year	Pop.	±%
1801	6,574	—
1949	10,275	+56.3%
1900	11,685	+13.7%
1930	12,905	+10.4%
1960	13,900	+7.7%
1981	13,020	−6.3%
1991	13,447	+3.3%
2001	15,753	+17.1%
2004	17,252	+9.5%
2006	18,273	+5.9%
2008	19,293	+5.6%
2011	17,604	−8.8%

Located in the central part of Portugal, the municipality of Lousã is part of the old district of Coimbra, in the subregion of Pinhal Interior Norte, and limited in the north by Vila Nova de Poiares, in the east by Góis and Miranda do Corvo, and in the south by Castanheira de Pêra and Figueiró dos Vinhos, making part of the district of Leiria. This constitutes an area of approximately 138.4 square kilometres (53.4 mi^{2}), of which 58.6& is forested, 17.2% in use by agriculture, 22.1% uncultivated/unused and .1% hydrographic resources, while only 2% is inhabited.

Administratively, the municipality is divided into 4 civil parishes (freguesias):

- Foz de Arouce e Casal de Ermio
- Lousã e Vilarinho
- Serpins
- Gândaras

The municipality's natural resources, and in particular the geophysical morphology of the mountainous region has shaped the human settlement and assisted some economic growth in the last centuries.

The regions demographic viability has primarily been shaped by its distance from Coimbra, and owing to its location along the Estrada Nacional 17, known as the Estrada da Beira, benefited from its connectivity from other municipalities and economic centers (including the Coimbra-Guarda axis). On the other hand, its evolution is also linked to the principal agglomerated areas of the sub-regions of the Baixo Mondego region, including Coimbra-Figueira da Foz, and the Pinhal Litoral, such as the Pombal-Leiria corridor. These relationships provide some explanation for some of the municipalities growth.

Many of its residents commute to the city of Coimbra for work, shopping or attend schools, including the Coimbra University or hospital. The train service between Coimbra and Lousã has been interrupted in 2010. It was supposed to be replaced by a modern metro service, but the renovation was stopped due to the economic crisis and the bankruptcy of the company created to administer the new service.

=== Climate ===
Lousã has a Mediterranean climate (Köppen:Csb/Csa) with mild, rainy winters and hot, dry summers. The highest temperature recorded was 45 °C (113 °F) on September 7, 2016. Temperatures above 40 are not uncommon during summer and so are wildfires. In 2017, more than 4560 ha of forest in the municipality were burnt due to 28 different wildfires.

Lousã sits at around 200 m (660 ft) high, and it currently has an active station at its aerodrome, but because this station is relatively new, data from the older, now inactive station in the mountains nearby, at a higher altitude, is also represented in the climate chart below:

Climate data for Lousã (aerodrome), 1998-2019 normals, altitude: 195 m (640 ft)
Month	Jan	Feb	Mar	Apr	May	Jun	Jul	Aug	Sep	Oct	Nov	Dec	Year
Mean daily maximum °C (°F)	14.3 (57.7)	15.9 (60.6)	18.4 (65.1)	20.8 (69.4)	24.3 (75.7)	27.9 (82.2)	30.8 (87.4)	31.8 (89.2)	28.9 (84.0)	23.5 (74.3)	17.4 (63.3)	14.8 (58.6)	22.4 (72.3)
Daily mean °C (°F)	8.5 (47.3)	9.8 (49.6)	11.9 (53.4)	13.9 (57.0)	16.8 (62.2)	19.7 (67.5)	21.6 (70.9)	22.1 (71.8)	20.0 (68.0)	16.6 (61.9)	11.5 (52.7)	9.2 (48.6)	15.1 (59.2)
Mean daily minimum °C (°F)	4.0 (39.2)	4.9 (40.8)	6.6 (43.9)	8.4 (47.1)	10.8 (51.4)	13.3 (55.9)	14.7 (58.5)	14.9 (58.8)	13.6 (56.5)	11.3 (52.3)	6.8 (44.2)	4.7 (40.5)	9.5 (49.1)
Average precipitation mm (inches)	118.1 (4.65)	106.2 (4.18)	66.1 (2.60)	87.7 (3.45)	66.9 (2.63)	31.0 (1.22)	8.6 (0.34)	11.4 (0.45)	45.3 (1.78)	118.0 (4.65)	107.3 (4.22)	117.0 (4.61)	883.6 (34.78)
Average relative humidity (%)	80.1	76.0	71.0	72.4	70.2	68.5	65.7	62.7	67.4	72.9	78.2	80.7	72.2
Source 1: IPMA
Source 2: Portuguese Environmental Agency (precipitation 1985-2020)

Climate data for Lousã (Boavista), 1965-1980 normals and extremes, altitude: 401 m (1,316 ft)
Month	Jan	Feb	Mar	Apr	May	Jun	Jul	Aug	Sep	Oct	Nov	Dec	Year
Record high °C (°F)	19.5 (67.1)	20.5 (68.9)	25.0 (77.0)	26.0 (78.8)	33.0 (91.4)	37.0 (98.6)	37.0 (98.6)	37.5 (99.5)	37.0 (98.6)	31.5 (88.7)	27.0 (80.6)	22.0 (71.6)	37.5 (99.5)
Mean daily maximum °C (°F)	11.4 (52.5)	12.3 (54.1)	14.2 (57.6)	16.2 (61.2)	18.8 (65.8)	22.5 (72.5)	26.2 (79.2)	26.6 (79.9)	24.3 (75.7)	19.6 (67.3)	14.4 (57.9)	11.4 (52.5)	18.2 (64.7)
Daily mean °C (°F)	7.9 (46.2)	8.5 (47.3)	9.7 (49.5)	11.4 (52.5)	13.8 (56.8)	17.0 (62.6)	19.8 (67.6)	20.0 (68.0)	18.6 (65.5)	15.2 (59.4)	10.5 (50.9)	7.8 (46.0)	13.4 (56.0)
Mean daily minimum °C (°F)	4.4 (39.9)	4.7 (40.5)	5.2 (41.4)	6.5 (43.7)	8.9 (48.0)	11.4 (52.5)	13.4 (56.1)	13.4 (56.1)	12.9 (55.2)	10.8 (51.4)	6.6 (43.9)	4.1 (39.4)	8.5 (47.3)
Record low °C (°F)	−5.5 (22.1)	−5.3 (22.5)	−3.5 (25.7)	−1.0 (30.2)	1.0 (33.8)	5.0 (41.0)	6.0 (42.8)	6.5 (43.7)	4.0 (39.2)	1.1 (34.0)	−1.5 (29.3)	−5.0 (23.0)	−5.5 (22.1)
Average precipitation mm (inches)	171.3 (6.74)	181.3 (7.14)	114.5 (4.51)	100.4 (3.95)	115.5 (4.55)	57.6 (2.27)	21.7 (0.85)	21.2 (0.83)	57.9 (2.28)	115.0 (4.53)	128.2 (5.05)	136.6 (5.38)	1,221.2 (48.08)
Average relative humidity (%)	84	83	79	77	75	73	68	65	70	76	82	86	77
Source: IPMA

== Economy ==
Economically, the region's growth has been based on transformative industries in the secondary and tertiary sectors of the economy. The decline in agricultural activities, which was always based on local consumption, is seen therefore as a realignment of activities toward forestry. Further, economic activities that have brought growth, have been associated with secondary activities such as the pulp and paper industry and electronics, as well as the manufacture/processing of olive oil, wine and liqueurs (Licor Beirão). Tertiary activities have maintained a supporting role, although tourism has developed into a strong growth industry, visiters attracted by the Serra da Lousã and the curious Aldeias de Xisto (villages of schist), along with other local patrimony and natural resources.

== Architecture ==
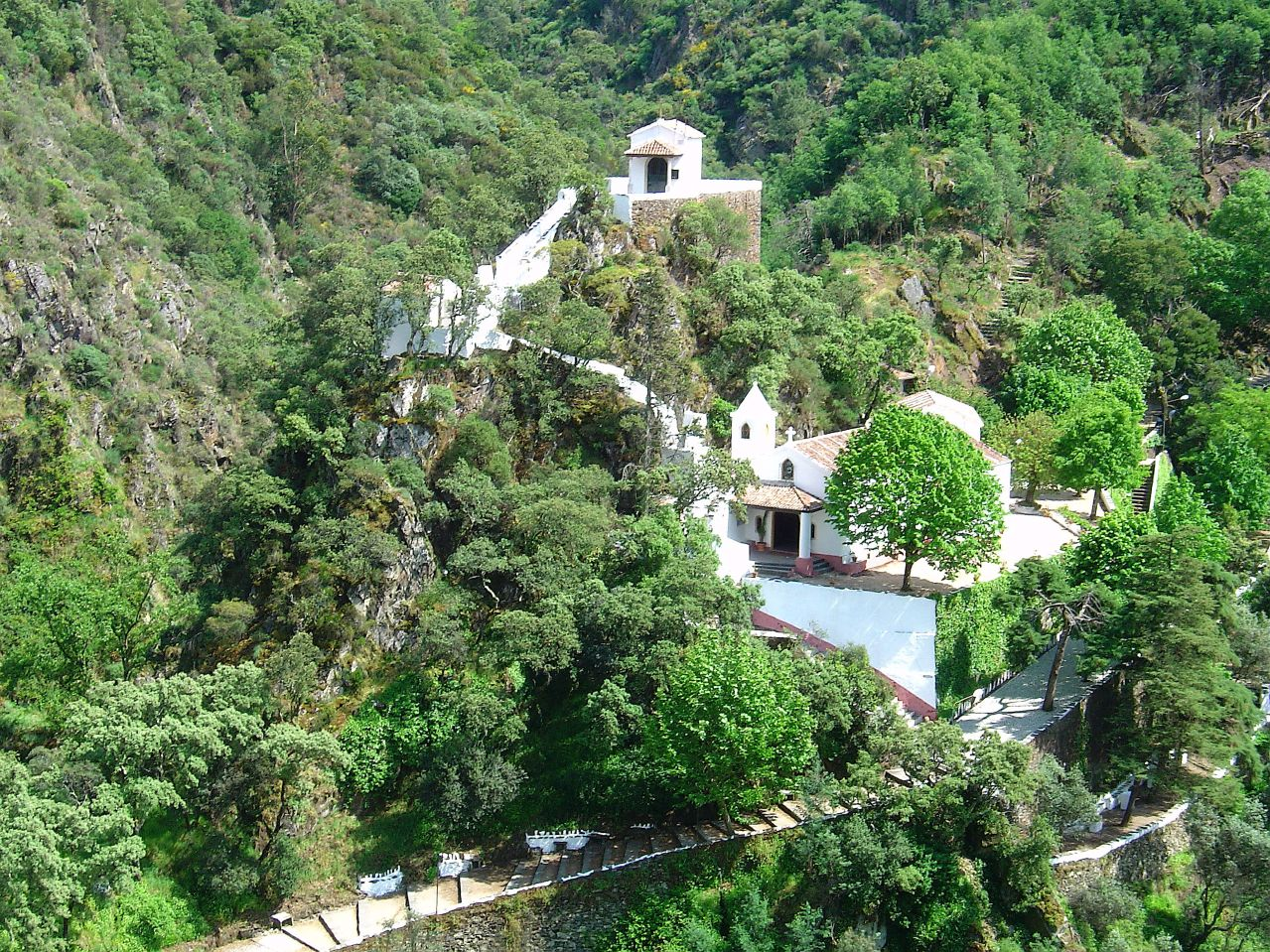
Some of the chapels of the Sanctuary of Nossa Senhora da Piedade

In addition to the Serra da Lousã mountains and natural pools in the hills, the municipality has many manors, religious temples and military outposts that dot the landscape, such as:

=== Civic ===
- (Old) Municipal Hall (Portuguese: Antigos Paços do Concelho), a three-storey building that once housed the municipal authority, this stoic rectangular building was constructed in the 17th century, but abandoned in favour of the Palace of the Viscountess of Espinhal's former residence;
- Municipal Hall of Lousã (Portuguese: Câmara Municipal da Lousã/Paços do Concelho da Lousã), the municipal hall of Lousã, although designed in the Baroque-style is actually of recent construction, dating to the 1930s, by João Moura Coutinho de Almeida Eça, of Braga;

=== Military ===
- Castle of Lousã (Portuguese: Castelo de Lousã), the 11th-century castle, dates from the pacification of the territory of Lousã by Sisnando Davides, and was used a summer retreat by the court of Queen Mafalda;

=== Religious ===
- Chapel of the Misericórdia (Portuguese: Santuário de Nossa Senhora da Piedade), the 16th century chapel includes a single longitudinal nave, decorated in Baroque era altarpieces and retables;
- Sanctuary of Nossa Senhora da Piedade (Portuguese: Santuário de Nossa Senhora da Piedade), vernacular religious architecture in the Revivalist era, the Marian sanctuary is actually a group of four chapels that were raised during different epochs, near the castle of Lousã, beginning with the 15th century chapel constructed from a petition of alms to King Afonso V of Portugal.

== Notable people ==
- Francisco José Fernandes Costa (1867 in Foz de Arouce – 1925) a lawyer and politician; civil governor of Coimbra; Govt. minister and President of the Ministry (Prime Minister) of the short-lived "five minutes government", which resigned the same day it was to take office in 1920.
- Nuno Assis (born 1977 in Lousã) a former footballer with 476 club caps
