= Coimbra District =

District of Portugal

Coordinates: 40°12′40″N 8°25′44″W

Coimbra
- District
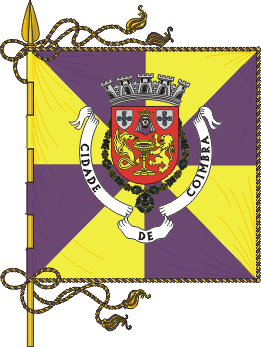
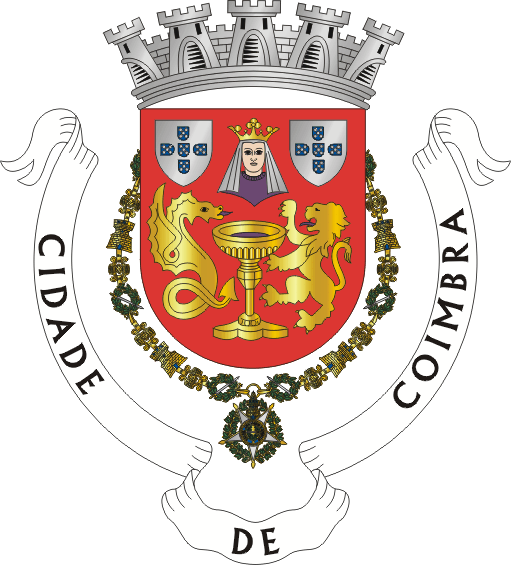
- Flag Coat of arms

- Location of Coimbra within continental Portugal
- Country: Portugal
- Region: Central Portugal
- Historical province: Beira
- Number of municipalities: 17
- Number of parishes: 161
- Capital: Coimbra

Area
  - Total: 3,947 km^{2} (1,524 sq mi)

Population
  - Total: 441,245
  - Density: 111.8/km^{2} (289.5/sq mi)
- ISO 3166 code: PT-06
- No. of parliamentary representatives: 9

Coimbra (Note: pronounced [kuˈĩbɾɐ] or [ˈkwĩbɾɐ]) is a district located in the Centro region, Portugal. The district capital is the city of Coimbra.

== Municipalities ==
The district is composed by 17 municipalities:

- Arganil
- Cantanhede
- Coimbra
- Condeixa-a-Nova
- Figueira da Foz
- Góis
- Lousã
- Mira
- Miranda do Corvo
- Montemor-o-Velho
- Oliveira do Hospital
- Pampilhosa da Serra
- Penacova
- Penela
- Soure
- Tábua
- Vila Nova de Poiares

== Summary of votes and seats won 1976-2022 ==
Summary of election results from Coimbra district, 1976-2022
Parties	%	S	%	S	%	S	%	S	%	S	%	S	%	S	%	S	%	S	%	S	%	S	%	S	%	S	%	S	%	S	%	S
Parties	1976		1979		1980		1983		1985		1987		1991		1995		1999		2002		2005		2009		2011		2015		2019		2022	
PS	40.9	6	35.1	5	35.9	5	45.3	6	28.5	3	28.7	4	34.4	4	49.1	6	47.2	6	41.3	5	45.4	6	38.0	4	29.2	3	35.3	4	39.0	5	45.2	6
PSD	26.7	4	In AD				27.8	3	29.5	4	50.0	6	49.9	6	34.5	4	35.2	4	41.0	5	31.9	4	30.6	4	40.1	5	In PàF		26.6	3	29.1	3
CDS-PP	12.5	1	In AD				10.2	1	8.6	1	4.5		3.5		7.1		6.0		6.7		5.5		8.8	1	9.9	1	In PàF		3.5		1.5	
PCP/APU/CDU	7.3	1	11.2	1	9.9	1	10.7	1	10.1	1	7.2	1	5.0		5.1		6.1		5.1		5.5		5.7		6.2		7.0		5.6		3.4	
AD			44.8	6	46.1	6																										
PRD									16.9	2	3.5																					
BE																	2.0		2.4		6.3		10.8	1	5.8		9.9	1	11.2	1	5.1	
PàF																											37.2	4				
Total seats	12						11						10												9							
Source: Comissão Nacional de Eleições

== See also ==
- Villages in the district of Coimbra:
  - Casal do Abade
  - Coiço
