= ESAC =

ESAC can refer to:

- Egon Schiele Art Centrum
- Employer Services Assurance Corporation
- Entertainment Software Association of Canada
- Escola Superior Agrária de Coimbra
- European Space Astronomy Centre
- esac, a Bash keyword that ends a case statement
