= Women and video games =

Women as makers and consumers of video games

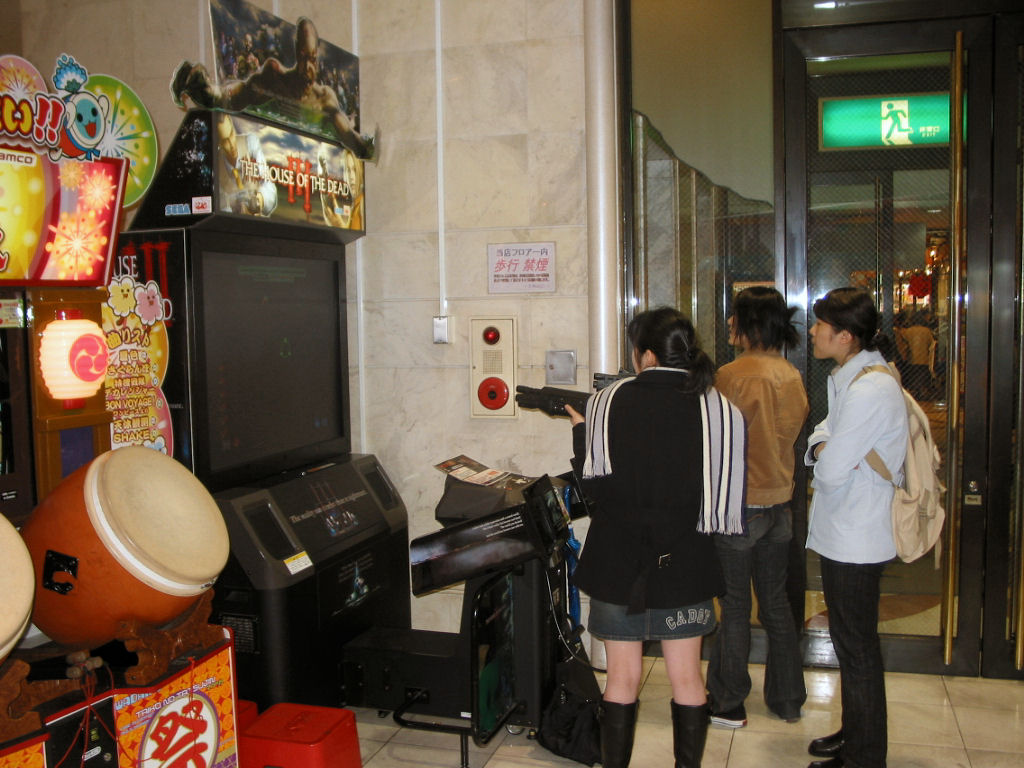
Women playing The House of the Dead III in an amusement arcade in Japan, 2005

The relationship between women and video games has received extensive academic and media attention. Since the 1990s, female gamers have commonly been regarded as a minority. However, industry surveys have shown that over time, the gender ratio has become closer to equal. Beginning mainly in the 2010s, women have been found to make up around half of all gamers. The gender ratio differs significantly between game genres, and women are highly underrepresented in genres such as first-person shooters and grand strategy games. Sexism in video gaming, including sexual harassment, as well as underrepresentation of women as characters in games, is an increasing topic of discussion in video game culture.

Advocates for increasing the number of female gamers stress the problems attending disenfranchisement of women from one of the fastest-growing cultural realms as well as the largely untapped nature of the female gamer market. Efforts to include greater female participation in the medium have addressed the problems of gendered advertising, social stereotyping, and the lack of female video game creators (coders, developers, producers, etc.). The terms "girl gamer" or "gamer girl" have been used as a reappropriated term for female players to describe themselves, but it has also been criticized as counterproductive or offensive.

== Demographics of female players ==
In 2008, a Pew Internet & American Life Project study found that among teens, 39% of men and 22% of women describe themselves as daily gamers. This trend was found to be stronger the younger the age group. The study found that while adult men are significantly more likely to play console games than adult women, on other platforms they are equally likely to play. But even in this area, the numbers are moving towards equality: in 2012, Nintendo reported that half of its users were women, and in 2015 another Pew study found that more American women (42%) than men (37%) owned video game consoles. In 2013, Variety reported that female participation increased with age (61% of women and 57% of men aged 45 to 64 played games).

Female participation in gaming is increasing. According to an Entertainment Software Association survey, women players in the United States increased from 40% in 2010 to 48% in 2014. Today, despite the dominant perception that most gamers are men, the ratio of female to male gamers is rather balanced, mirroring the population at large.

A mid-2015 survey reported by UKIE indicates that 42% of UK gamers are female.

An article in 2020 found that in Q4 2019 female gamers made up 52% of PC gamers, and 50% of console gamers, and 61% of mobile gamers.

As of 2023, in the United States the female gaming demographics were: 54% of mobile video game players were female, 50% of PC video game players were female, and 47% of console video game players were female. Each percentage was a 1% increase year-over-year. As for ownership of specific consoles, 52% of Nintendo Switch consoles in the United States were female owned, followed by the Xbox Series X and Series S at 45% female owned, and the PlayStation 5 at 41% female owned.

=== Data collection ===
In North America, national demographic surveys have been conducted yearly by the U.S. Entertainment Software Association (ESA) (Note: The ESA was known as the Interactive Digital Software Association (IDSA) prior to 16 July 2003.) since at least 1997, and the Canadian Entertainment Software Association of Canada (ESAC) since 2006. Other organizations including the Australian/New-Zealander Interactive Games & Entertainment Association (IGEA) since 2005 collect and publish demographic data on their constituent populations on a semi-regular basis. In Europe, the regional Interactive Software Federation of Europe (ISFE) and numerous smaller national groups like the Belgian Entertainment Association (BEA), the Nederlandse Vereniging van Producenten en Importeurs van beeld- en geluidsdragers (NVPI), and the Association for UK Interactive Entertainment (UKIE) have also begun to collect data on female video gamers since 2012. One-off market research studies and culture surveys have been produced by a wide variety of other sources including some segments of the gaming press and other culture writers since the 1980s as well.

Not only has the general female gaming population been tracked, but the spread of this population has been tracked over many facets of gaming. For more than 10 years, groups like the ESA and ESAC have gathered data on the gender of video game purchasers, the percentage of women gamers within certain age brackets, and the average number of years women gamers have been gaming. The ESAC in particular has gone into great depth reporting age-related segmentation of the market between both male and female gamers. Other statistics have been collected from time to time on a wide variety of facets influencing the video game market.

==== Survey data ====
ESAC-reported Canadian female to male gamer ratios
View source data.
Video gaming (Note: ESAC-reported Canadian female to male gamer ratios:)
IDSA/ESA-reported USA female to male gamer ratios per platform
View source data.
Video gaming (Note: IDSA/ESA-reported USA female to male gamer ratios per platform - Video gaming:)
PC gaming (Note: IDSA/ESA-reported USA female to male gamer ratios per platform - PC gaming:)
Console gaming (Note: IDSA/ESA-reported USA female to male gamer ratios per platform - Console gaming:)
Online gaming (Note: IDSA/ESA-reported USA female to male gamer ratios per platform - Online gaming:)

International comparison of gamer gender ratios
Region / Country	Study	2012 ratio (female to male)	2013 ratio (female to male)	2016 ratio (female to male)
Australia	IGEA	47 : 53	—N/a	47 : 53
Austria	ISFE	44 : 56	—N/a	—N/a
Belgium	ISFE	46 : 54	—N/a	—N/a
Canada	ESAC	46 : 54	46 : 54	49 : 51
China	17173	27 : 73	—N/a	
Czech Republic	ISFE	44 : 56	—N/a	—N/a
Denmark	ISFE	42 : 58	—N/a	—N/a
Europe	ISFE	45 : 55	—N/a	—N/a
Finland	ISFE	49 : 51	—N/a	—N/a
France	ISFE	47 : 53	52 : 48	—N/a
Germany	ISFE	44 : 56	49 : 51	—N/a
Great Britain	ISFE	46 : 54	42 : 58	—N/a
Italy	ISFE	48 : 52	—N/a	—N/a
Japan	17173	—N/a	—N/a	66 : 34
Korea	17173	—N/a	—N/a	37 : 63
Netherlands	ISFE	46 : 54	—N/a	—N/a
New Zealand	IGEA	46 : 54	46 : 54	—N/a
Norway	ISFE	46 : 54	—N/a	—N/a
Poland	ISFE	44 : 56	—N/a	—N/a
Portugal	ISFE	43 : 57	—N/a	—N/a
Spain	ISFE	44 : 56	45 : 55	—N/a
Sweden	ISFE	47 : 53	—N/a	—N/a
Switzerland	ISFE	44 : 56	—N/a	—N/a
United States	ESA	47 : 53	45 : 55	41 : 59

=== Historical prevalence ===
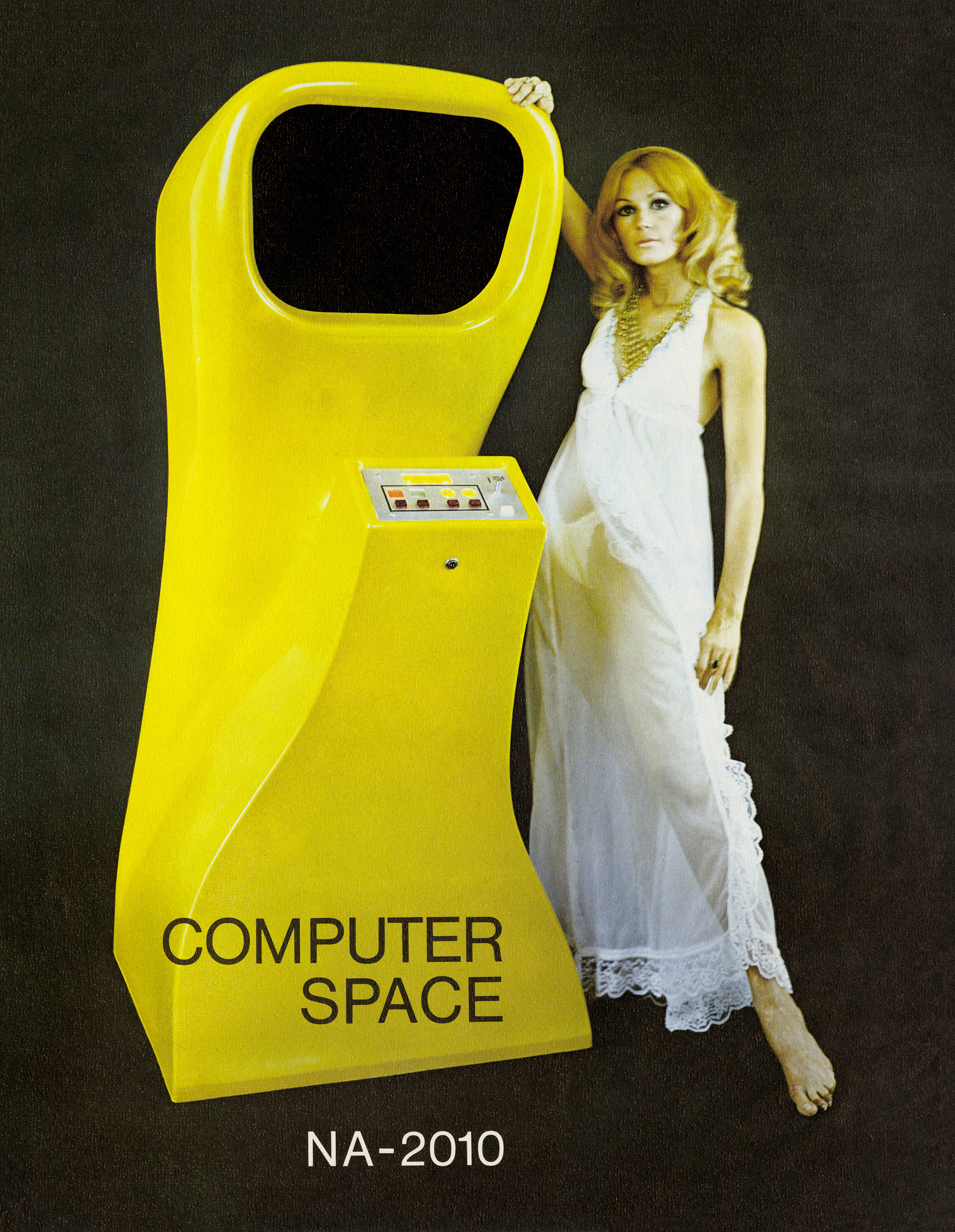
A 1971 flyer for Computer Space

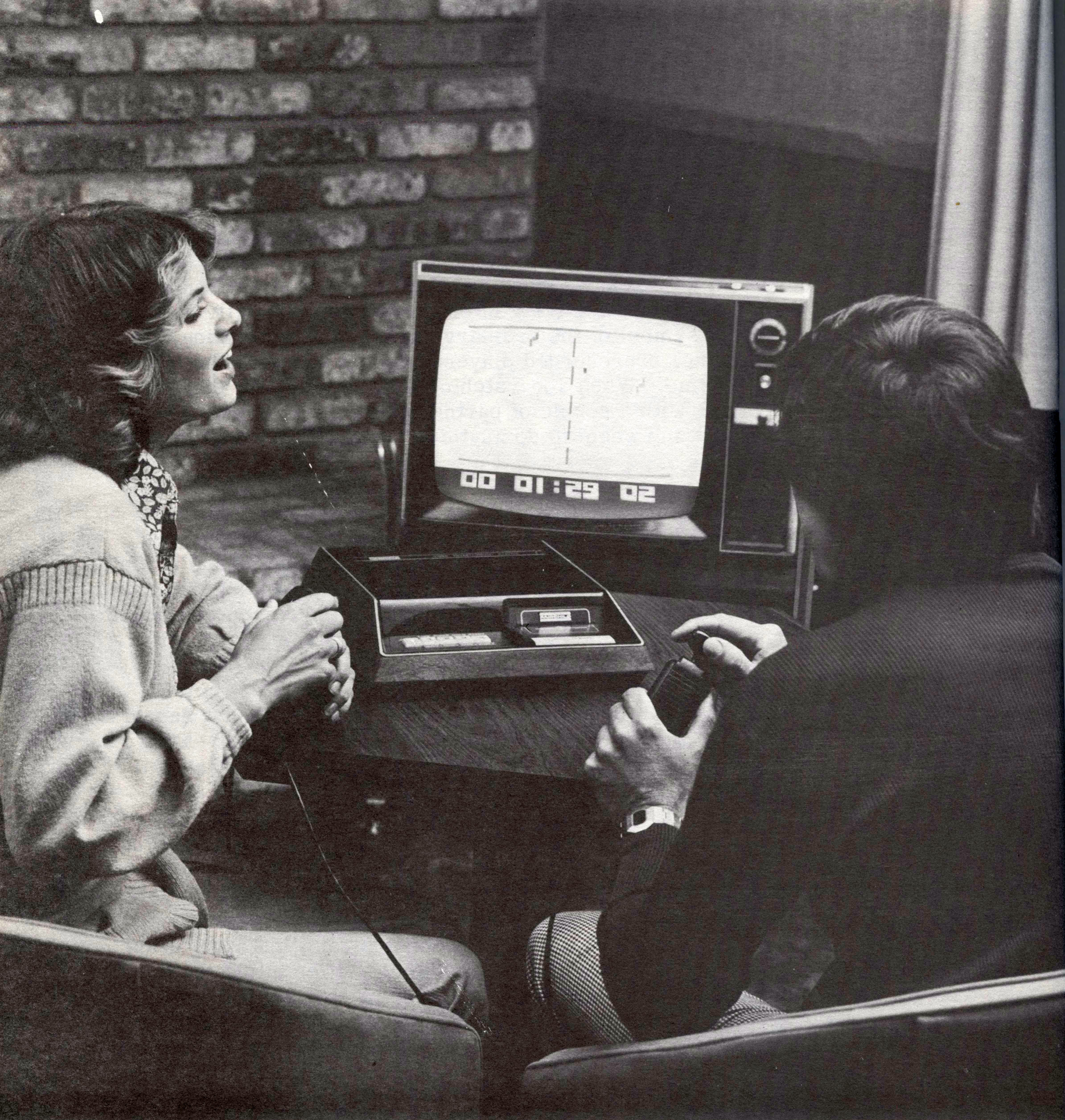
Two people play a Fairchild Channel F in 1977.

- The author of Pac-Man, Toru Iwatani, attempted to appeal to a wider audience—beyond the typical demographics of young boys and teenagers. His intention was to attract girls to arcades because he found there were very few games that were played by women at the time. Electronic Games reported in 1982 that it was "the first commercial videogame to involve large numbers of women"; the simple gameplay and lack of violence attracted many new players. Of the nine arcade games that How to Win Video Games (1982) discussed, Pac-Man was the only one with women as a majority of players. In response, the sequel Ms. Pac-Man, launched in 1981, featured a female protagonist.
  - The success of Pac-Man led to more women pursuing video game development.
- In May 1982, sociologist Sidney J. Kaplan reported the composition of arcade video game players to be roughly 80% male and 20% female.
- In a 1982 survey conducted by Electronic Games, the demographics of female arcade players were broadly similar to their male counterparts. The median age for female arcade players was 26, with a quarter under 16, a quarter between 16–25, 42% between 26–40 and 8% over 40.
- How to Win Video Games estimated that men were 95% of Defender and 90% of Omega Race players, while women were half the players of Centipede, Donkey Kong, and three other games.
- In 1983, researcher John W. Trinkaus published findings that there were 8 male players to every 3 female players in video game arcades.
- In 1983, a Coleco executive stated at the Boston Computer Society that the target audience for the new Adam home computer, based on its ColecoVision console, was "boys age 8 to 16 and their fathers. We believe those are the two groups that really fuel computer purchases". When audience members booed, he added that the marketing strategy was based on consumer research.
- In 1983, the first computer game specifically written for young girls, Jenny of the Prairie was released.
- In 1985, a study of a University of Illinois dormitory found that although more women students than men used newly installed microcomputers, only 1% of women's computer use was for games, compared to 16% for men.
- In 1988, Epyx CEO Dave Morse stated that California Games was the first game from his company to appeal equally to boys and girls during playtesting.
- In 1988, Playthings reported that among primary video game users, women represented 21% of all gamers.
- In 1988, a study by Nintendo reported that 27% of NES players in the United States were female.
- A 1993 self-reported survey by Computer Gaming World found that 7% of its readers were female.
- In 1994, a survey by Electronic Games reported that, among American women gamers, the Sega Genesis was most popular, with 75% ownership, followed by the SNES with 58.3% ownership, the Game Boy with 58%, and MS-DOS with 50%.
- In 1996, Mattel, Inc. released Barbie Fashion Designer, selling over 600,000 copies. The game was considered an important step in advancing an interest in the design of games for women.
- In 1998, The Boston Globe stated that the video game market for young girls was "exploding" with titles such as The American Girls Premiere.
- In 2006, Nintendo reported that 44% of Nintendo DS owners were female, with the majority of Nintendogs owners being female.

=== Self-identification as gamers ===
While 48% of women in the United States report having played a video game, only 6% identify as gamers, compared to 15% of men who identify as gamers as of 2015. This rises to 9% among women aged 18–29, compared to 33% of men in that age group. Half of female PC gamers in the U.S. consider themselves to be core or hardcore gamers. In 2012, an EEDAR survey found that nearly 60% of mobile gamers were women and that 63% of these female mobile gamers played online multiplayer mobile games.

Connotations of "gamer" with sexism on the fringe of gaming culture has caused women to be less willing to adopt the label. "Girl gamers" or "gamer girls" is a label for women who regularly play games. While some critics have advocated use of the label as a reappropriated term, others have described the term as unhelpful, offensive, and even harmful or misleading. The word "girl", for example, has been seen as an inherently age-linked term that glosses over the difference between women over 30 and younger women. The term "girl gamer" rather than simply "gamer" has also been described as perpetuating the minority position of female gamers. For many critics uncomfortable with the term "girl gamer", its over-embracing may lead to the perpetuation of negative stereotypes of female gamers as oversexualized, casual, and sometimes defiant or confrontational. This in turn can result in poor game design. These critics submit that there is no single definition of a female gamer, and that women gamers are as diverse as any other group of people.

A lack of role models for female gamers contributes to a feeling that they should edit their femininity to maintain credibility as a gamer, and that they must fit into the caricatured role of the "girl gamer" to be accepted. Negative stereotyping of female video game players as "girl gamers" often comes from male gamers who have been negatively stereotyped by the broader society. Social stigma against games has influenced some women to distance themselves from the term "gamer", even though they may play regularly. Parental influence has been theorized to perpetuate some of the stereotypes that female gamers face as boys are bought gifts like an Xbox while girls are bought girl-focused games like Barbie or educational games.

Controversially, some critics such as Simon Parkin have suggested that the term "gamer" is endemic to the stereotypical male audience and has become outmoded by the industry's changing demographics.

== Genre preferences ==
There are differences between the video game genres preferred, on average, by women and men. Bill Finzer of the University of San Francisco said in 1982 that most games are designed by men with an "aggressive component" that does not appeal to women, as "they just don't share that fantasy". "It's clear from observations that games like Pac Man are more attractive to girls and women", Elizabeth Stage of the Lawrence Hall of Science said, "simply because explosions, bombing, shooting and killing are less attractive to them". Paul Cubbage of Atari Program Exchange said that women prefer games with cooperation, creatures like Pac-Man and Frogger, and humor or surprise. Thomas W. Malone of Xerox PARC said that instead of designing specifically for men or women, developers should appeal to both sexes with "games that give the user a choice of fantasies".

A 2017 report by the video game analytics company Quantic Foundry, based on surveys of about 270,000 gamers, found varying proportions of male and female players within different game genres. The study didn't attribute the cause of differences in percentages to gender alone, stating a correlation between games less played by women and features that discourage women, such as a lack of female protagonists, required communication with strangers online, or tendency to cause motion sickness. The study also mentioned that, within the same genre, some specific games show a noticeably higher or lower percentage of women than other similar titles. A content analysis report of 571 games released between 1983 and 2014 with playable female characters touches on one of the possible reasons behind a lack of women in certain video game genres; women may choose to avoid certain genres depicting female characters in a negative light, such as oversexualization, in order not to become part of a "self-perpetuating cycle".

The 2017 study reported the following proportions of male and female gamers with respect to specific genres:

Genre	Women	Men	Outlier games within the genre
Match-3	69%	31%	Candy Crush Saga (83% women)
Family or farming simulator	69%	31%	
Casual puzzle	42%	58%	
Atmospheric exploration	41%	59%	
Interactive drama	37%	63%	
High fantasy MMO	36%	64%	World Of Warcraft (23% women)
Japanese RPG	33%	66%	
Western RPG	26%	74%	Dragon Age: Inquisition (48% women)
Survival roguelike	25%	75%	
Platformer	25%	75%	
City-building	22%	78%	
Action RPG	20%	80%	
Sandbox	18%	82%	
Action-adventure	18%	82%	
Sci-fi MMO	16%	84%	Star Wars: The Old Republic (29% women)
Open world	14%	86%	Assassin's Creed Syndicate (27% women)
Turn-based strategy	11%	89%	
MOBA	10%	90%	
Grand strategy	7%	93%	
First-person shooter	7%	93%	
Racing	6%	94%	
Tactical shooter	4%	96%	
Sports	2%	98%	

While male audiences prefer fast-paced, explosive action and combat, women tend to prefer in-game communication and interpersonal relationships (character development and plot dynamics). Women have also been shown to prefer role-playing video games to first-person shooters, and Malone found that girls preferred to play a Hangman video game over a darts simulation that boys enjoyed.

In-game activities may also differ between the sexes in games with less linear plots such as the Grand Theft Auto series. Women are often characterized as preferring story-driven games or constructive games like The Sims or Civilization, but this is not universally true. In 2013, Variety reported that 30% of women were playing more violent games. Of this 30%, 20% played Call of Duty and 15% played Grand Theft Auto. There has been persistent female interest in action-adventure games and MMORPGs like World of Warcraft and Second Life. Compared to men, female MMORPG players tend to place more emphasis on socialization relative to achievement-oriented play. This emphasis on socialization extends beyond just the game itself: In a study published in the Journal of Communication in 2009, researchers found that 61% of female MMORPG players played with a romantic partner, compared to 24% of men.

According to data collected by Quantic Foundry in 2016, the primary motivations why people play video games differ, on average, by gender. While men frequently want most to compete with others and destroy things, women often want most to complete challenges and immerse themselves in other worlds:

Primary motivation	Description	Women	Men
Completion	Finishing everything, finding all collectibles and locations	17%	10%
Fantasy	Immersion in and exploring other worlds	16%	9%
Design	Expressing themselves, building or customizing things	15%	6%
Community	Socializing and collaborating with others	10%	9%
Story	Elaborate narrative, well-developed characters	9%	6%
Destruction	Blowing things up, creating chaos	8%	12%
Discovery	Asking "what if?", looking for novel outcomes	7%	6%
Competition	Competing with other players	5%	14%
Strategy	Decision-making and planning, balancing resources and goals	5%	8%
Power	Maximizing power in the game, obtaining the best items	4%	6%
Excitement	Action, thrills, fast-paced gameplay	3%	6%
Challenge	Exercising personal skill and ability, requiring practice	3%	7%

While video games and advertising were initially gender-neutral, advertising began to narrow its focus to young boys as a target market following the video game crash of 1983. Although commercial hits such as Myst and The Sims appealed to women, these were nonetheless seen by some as being outside the gaming mainstream. Critic Ian Bogost opined, "We're looking at where there isn't diversity and we're saying those games are the most valid games." Industry studies on the lack of women in gaming have also suffered at times from biases of interpretation. Kevin Kelly of Joystiq has suggested that a high degree of circular reasoning is evident when male developers use focus groups and research numbers to determine what kinds of games girls play. After making a bad game that targets those areas suggested by the marketing research, the game's lack of popularity among both genders is often attributed to the incorrect prejudice that "girls don't play games" rather than the true underlying problems such as poor quality and playability of the game. Whereas market data and research are important to reveal that markets exist, argues Kelly, they shouldn't be the guiding factor in how to make a game that appeals to girls. The argument has also been advanced that emphasis on market research is often skewed by the participants in the study. In studies on male gamers of the baby boomer generation, for example, players displayed a marked aversion to violence. The incorrect conclusion that could be drawn from this result—that men dislike violent games—may also be comparable to incorrect conclusions drawn from some female-oriented gaming studies. It has been suggested that developers can learn what girls want in a game by observing similarities in how different girl teams will react to and modify a game if given the opportunity.

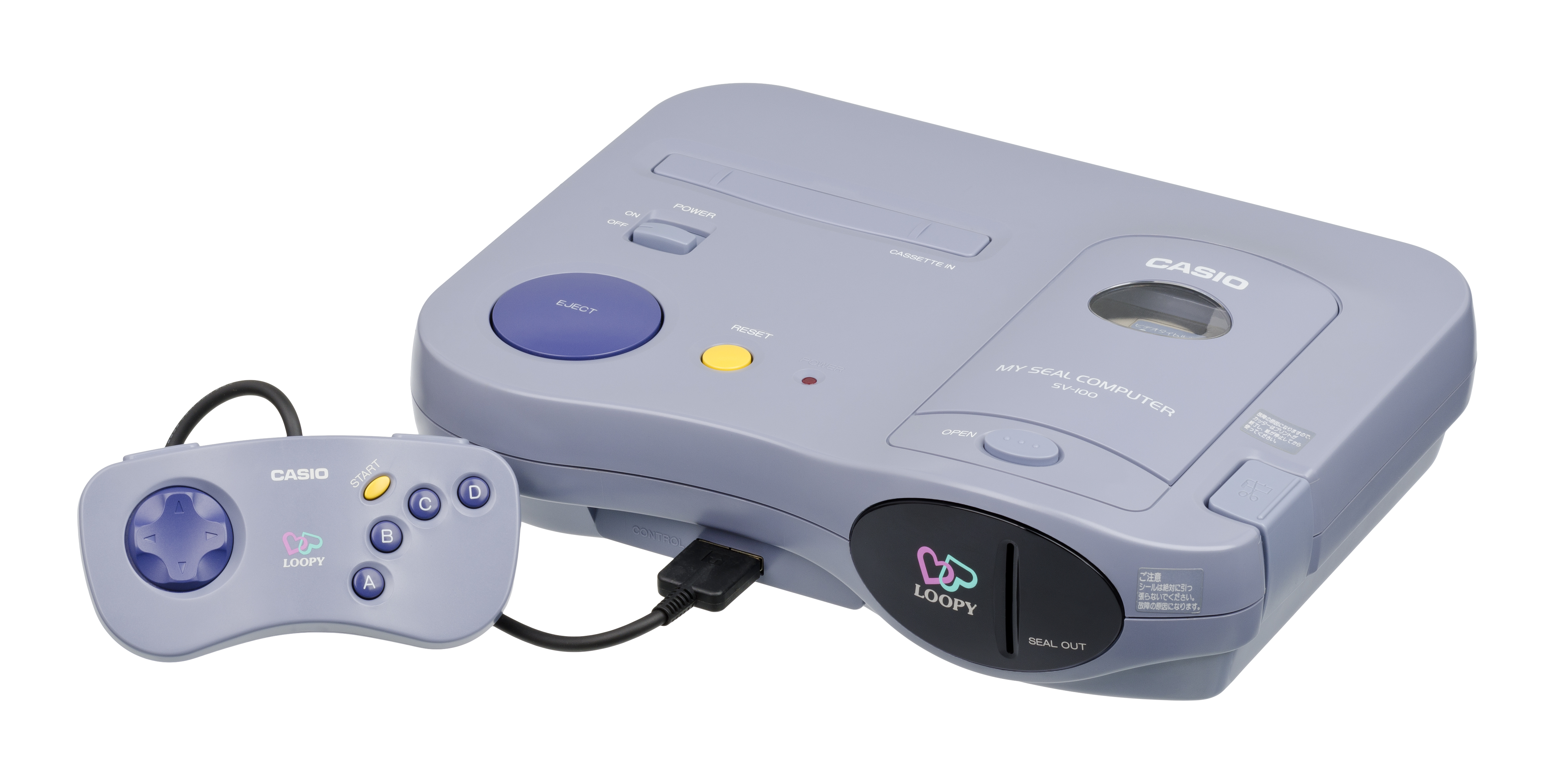
The Casio Loopy, created by Casio and released in October 1995 in Japan, was unique in that the marketing for it was completely targeted to female gamers.

In the past, "girl games" have frequently been created by adapting girl-oriented material in other media like The Baby-sitters Club, Barbie, and Nancy Drew while leaving male-targeted genres such as sport and driving simulators, role-playing games, and first-person shooters to the male audience. This has begun to change, however, with the expansion of entrepreneurial feminism and the concept of "games by girls for girls" that has been embraced by companies such as Her Interactive, Silicon Sisters and Purple Moon—all video gaming start ups that are female owned and largely female staffed. Creating games designed with regard to sociological, psychological, and cognitive research into girls' cultural interests, such companies hope to awaken a female-only market emphasizing fundamental differences between what girls want and what boys want in gaming. The movement to expand the existing market to include women through the development of gender-neutral games has also had a number of advocates. Critics have proposed that female gamers, especially older female gamers prefer gender-neutral games such as Tetris, Where in the World Is Carmen Sandiego?, or the King's Quest games to "girl games".

In examining game play habits at Internet cafés, South Korea has seen a rise in female gamers publicly playing games such as Lineage, while in other Asian countries this kind of public female gaming has remained rare; similarly, games such as Tamagotchi are seen as a gender neutral in Japan, but have been regarded as girls' games in the West. In other cases, female trends in one country may be indicators of associated changes in others, as in the case of a rising number of female Lineage players in Korea having led to increased number of female Lineage players in Taiwan. In Japan the rise of cute culture and its associated marketing has made gaming accessible for girls, and this trend has also carried over to Taiwan and recently China (both countries previously having focused mostly on MMOs and where parents usually place harsher restrictions on daughters than on sons).

== Skill levels ==
An aspect of game design that has been identified as negatively impacting female interest is the degree of expertise with gaming conventions and familiarity with game controls required to play the game. Atari programmer Carla Meninsky noted this was already present in the days of arcade games, whose cabinets were mostly put in bars, a male-centric environment, and given the games required fast reactions that could only be improved by practice, specially as the difficulty increased along with playing time, "What woman is going to hang out in a bar all day just to get good at video games?" In-game tutorials have been found to bring both sexes into games faster, and new controllers such as Nintendo's Wii Remote, Microsoft's Kinect, and the various rhythm game controllers have affected demographics by making games easier to pick up and provide a better level playing-field. This trend has continued through the efforts of Nintendo in its release of the Wii. Leigh Alexander argued that appealing to women does not necessarily entail reduced difficulty or complexity. The perceived skill or performance gap between men and women may be fueled by other factors besides gender. In a 2016 study published in the Journal of Computer-Mediated Communication, researchers found that, after controlling for confounds such as the amount of play time and guild membership, women players advance at least as fast as men do in two MMOs, the Western EverQuest II and the Chinese Chevaliers' Romance III.

=== Male behavior towards female gamers ===
A 2015 study found that lower-skilled male players of Halo 3 were more hostile towards teammates with a female voice, but behaved more submissively to players with a male voice. Higher-skilled male players, on the other hand, behaved more positively towards female players. The authors argued the male hostility towards female gamers in terms of evolutionary psychology, writing, "female-initiated disruption of a male hierarchy incites hostile behaviour from poor performing males who stand to lose the most status". In another study, it was found that female gamers who score lower on the synthesis dimension of feminist identity hold internalized misogyny, while female gamers who score higher are more resistant against it. Though this study pertains only to popular console video games, the results gives a possible reason as to why certain female players may continue playing despite hostile male attitudes in online games.

=== Women in competitive gaming ===
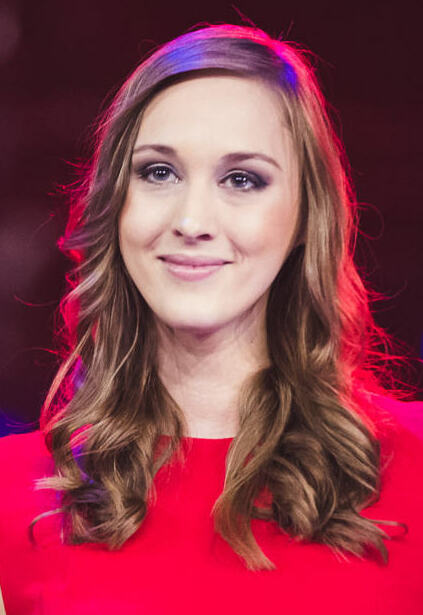
Belgian esports presenter Sjokz in 2015

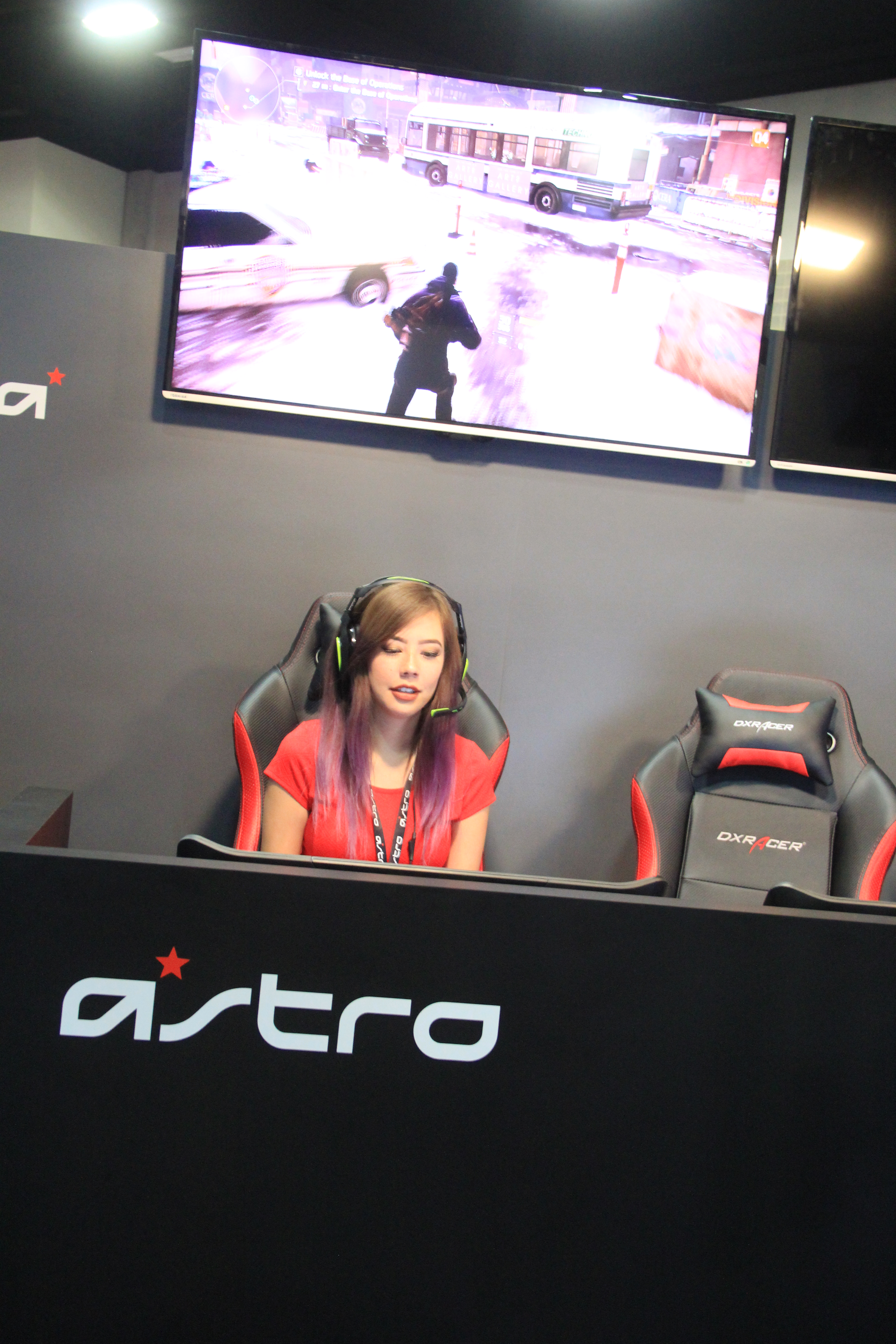
PAX South 2016, Texas, U.S.

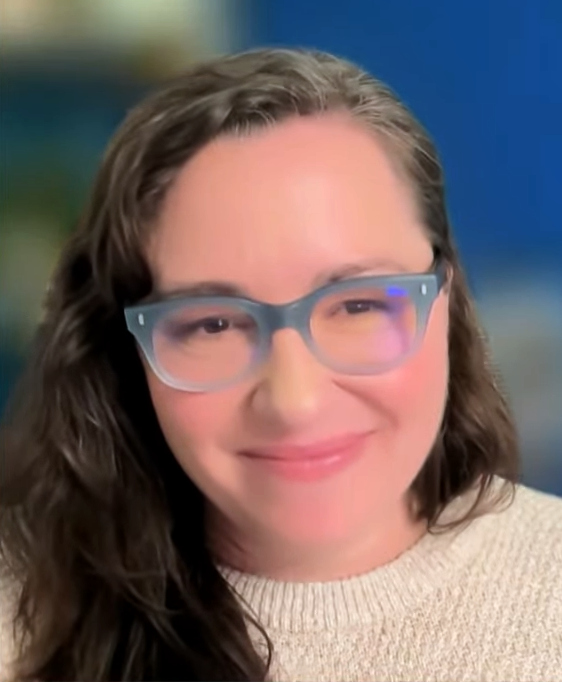
Stevie Case (pictured in 2023), one of the first notable female esports players, gaining recognition for beating Quake designer John Romero in a Quake deathmatch in 1997

The top female players in competitive gaming mainly get exposure in female-only tournaments, including such games as Counter-Strike, Dead or Alive 4, and StarCraft II.

- In 1984, Doris Self was recognised as the oldest competitive video gamer of that time by the Guinness World Records, at the age of 58.
- Canadian StarCraft II player Sasha Hostyn (Scarlett) first gained notoriety in the open qualifiers of IGN ProLeague 4, where she defeated top-tier Korean players. She is well known for being one of the few non-Korean players who can play at the same skill level as male Korean players.
- In 2012, Street Fighter x Tekken player Aris Bakhtanians commented on the lack of female players in the community, saying "sexual harassment is part of a culture, and if you remove that from the fighting game community, it's not the fighting game community." He later apologized for his comments.
- In 2014, organizers for a Hearthstone tournament in Finland were criticized for limiting registrations to male players only. This was due to the tournament being an offline qualifier for the IeSF World Championship, with its Hearthstone tournament open only to male players. The winner of the Finnish qualifier would risk not being eligible to participate in the main event if that player were female. The IeSF organization ultimately removed the male-only restriction from all of their tournaments, and in turn the Finnish qualifier that originally sparked the controversy also removed this restriction.
- In December 2015, Kayla "Squizzy" Squires became the first female Call of Duty player to turn professional upon qualifying for the Call of Duty World League in the Australian region.
- League of Legends player Maria "Remilia" Creveling, finished first in the 2015 Challenger Series Summer Split along with her teammates Renegades, which qualified the team for the 2016 North America League Championship Series (NA LCS) Spring Split. She became both the first woman and also the first transgender player to compete professionally in the (NA LCS). She joined Renegades as their support player but decided to step down from the team's starting roster three weeks into the 2016 (NA LCS) Spring Split citing anxiety and self-esteem issues as part of her reasoning behind leaving the team.
- On March 17, 2016, the esports organization Team Secret entered the CS:GO competitive scene with female player Julia "juliano" Kiran as the in-game leader. They proceeded to win the female tournament at Copenhagen Games 2016.

Dota 2 remains exclusively male-dominated when it comes to prestigious tournaments, with women mainly making their way into caster and staff positions. Jorien 'Sheever' van der Heijden, a Dota 2 esports commentator, has spoken out about women's esport on Dota 2 in 2019. In her opinion, exclusively female tournaments could still eventually lead to mixed teams:

There are actually a lot of female teams in Dota 2. And it seems to me that they've been playing each other in their own private leagues for a while now. Just recently there was an article (although I can't remember the title) that described the state of the women's Dota scene perfectly. There are already women-only tournaments in Dota, and if there are more, why not? They won't be a replacement for regular tournaments for everyone, but a separate niche for women's competitions. And I hope that there will be at least one player who will go against the system and create a mixed team, showing that women can play well too.

Another caster, Michelle 'Moxxi' Song, in 2020 stated that she is very skeptical on the idea of development of women's esports in Dota 2 due to entrenched misogyny:

[Do you think Dota needs to develop women's esports?] I don't think it's necessary. There would be a lot of problems. For example, when you have a woman on your team, whether it's in a pub or on the professional scene, a lot of players won't take her seriously. You'll be afraid to say anything because you'll be shut up straight away. On the other hand, a good idea would be to create a venue where girls can play with more confidence, being able to eventually make it to the main stage.

Alexandra 'Mirmedix' Shumskaya, a psychology and communication coach in esports, believes that the low presence of women on high-level competitive scene is due to both historical and biological factors:

Firstly, it's from society's historical vestiges. The second is how the games started in the first place. Initially, only men played them. The first computers, clubs... Girls didn't go to computer clubs. It turns out that the threshold of entry is such that the audience was initially set, and so it turned out. Well, plus the emotions that people get at the moment of playing games, they are closer to men - to maniacally chase achievements, to be the strongest. It's genetic.

== Women in the video game industry ==
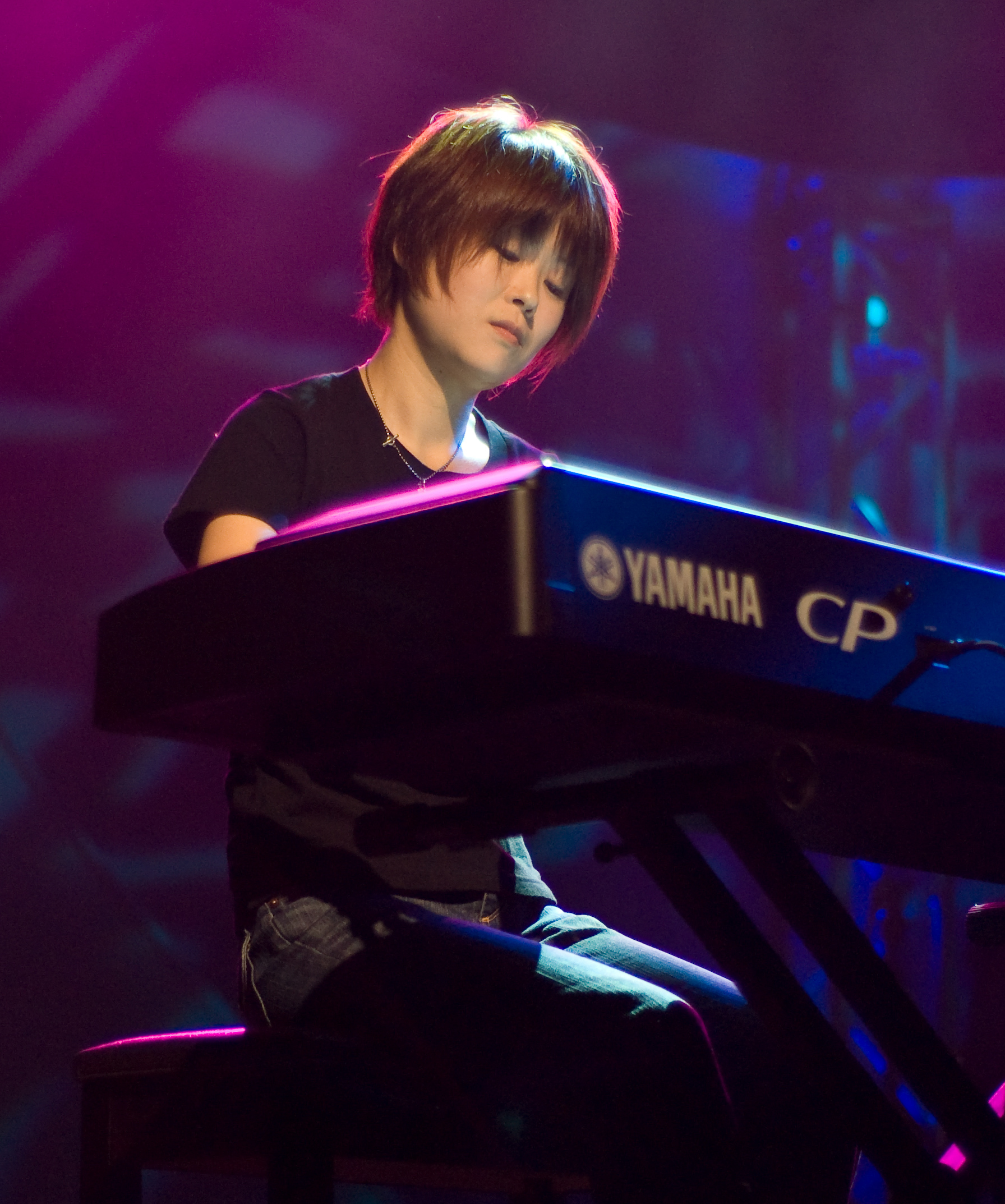
Video game composer, Kumi Tanioka in 2007

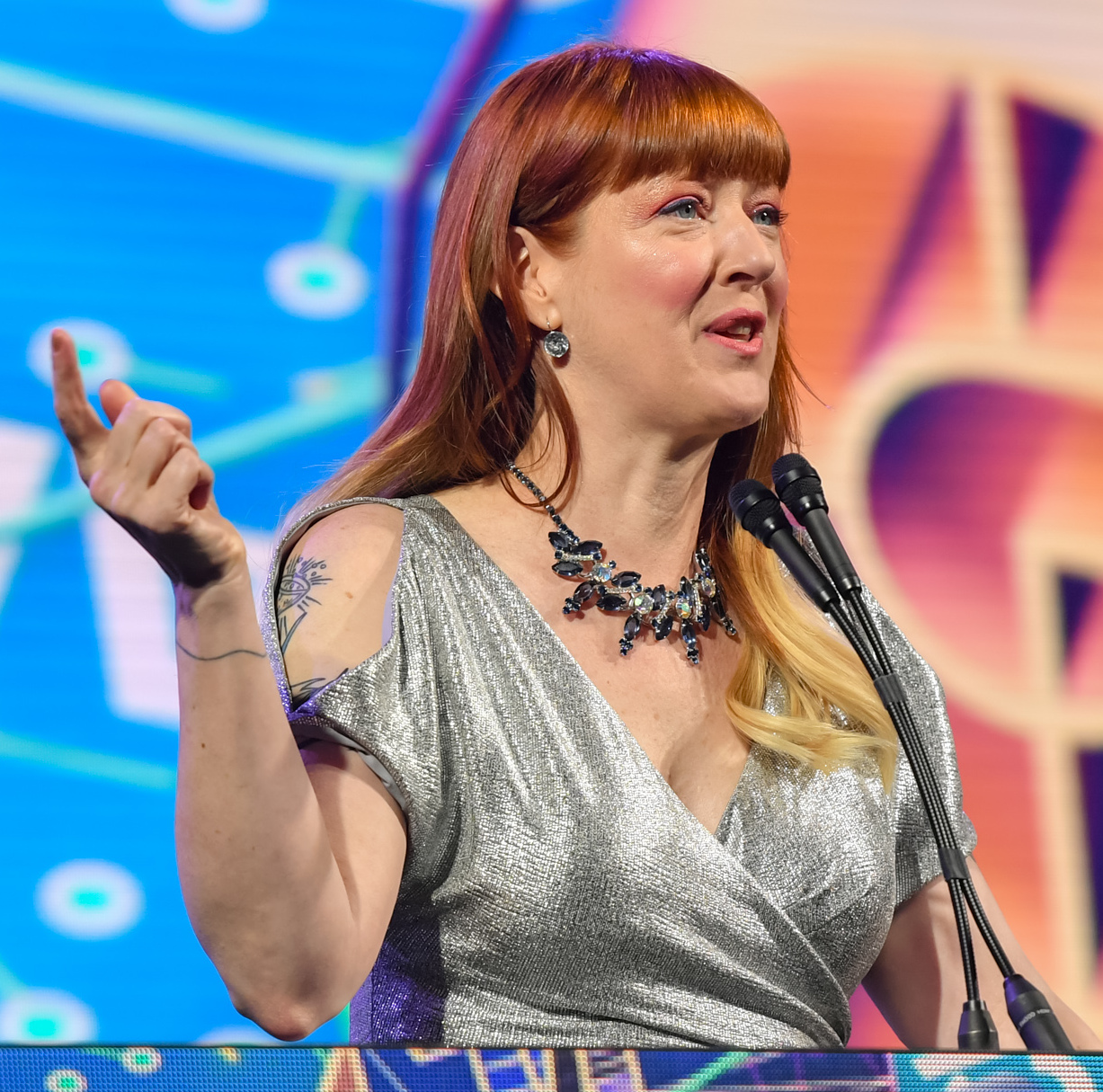
Robin Hunicke speaking at the 2018 Game Developers Conference

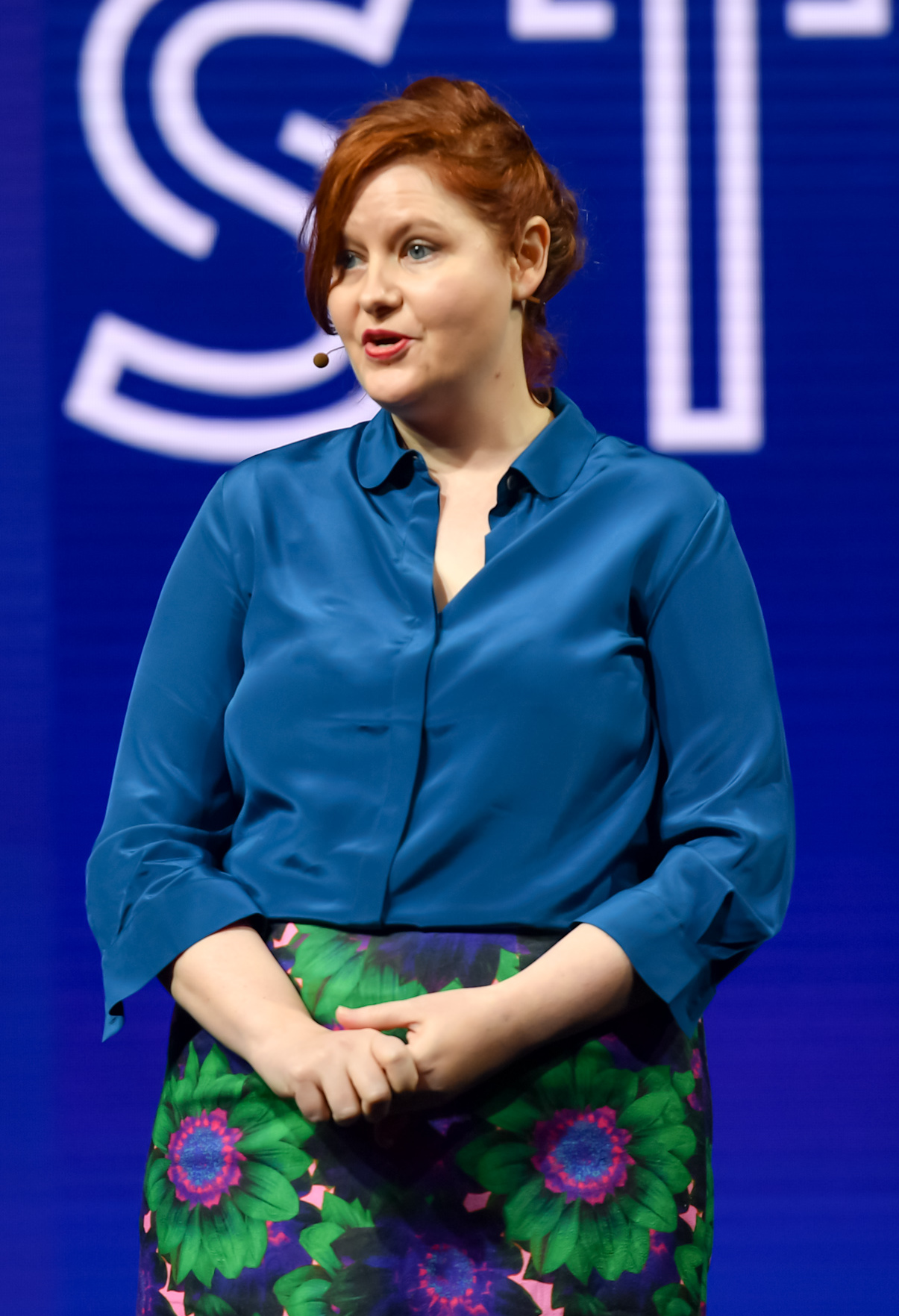
Siobhan Reddy speaking at the 2019 Game Developers Conference

Women have been part of the video game industry since the 1960s. Mabel Addis of The Sumerian Game (1964) was the first writer of a video game and first female game designer. Carol Shaw is recognized as the first woman to develop a commercially released game, 3-D Tic-Tac-Toe for the Atari 2600 in 1978, though she would gain later fame with her title River Raid in 1983. Other early female pioneers in the field include Dona Bailey who programmed the 1981 arcade game Centipede and its home console versions, and Roberta Williams who cowrote with her husband Ken the adventure game Mystery House for personal computers in 1980, and would later co-found Sierra On-Line.

In 1989, according to Variety, women constituted only 3% of the gaming industry. In 2013, Gary Carr (the creative director of Lionhead Studios) predicted that within the next 5 to 10 years, the games development workforce would be 50% female. According to Gamasutra's Game Developer Salary Survey 2014, women in the United States made 86 cents for every dollar men made. Game-designing women had the closest equity, making 96 cents for every dollar men made in the same job. Women in game audio make approximately 90 cents for every dollar that men made, according to GameSoundCon's Audio Industry Survey for 2019, although women in general have 2.4 years less experience than men in audio. However accounting for the experience difference, "the cost of being female [in game audio] is 2.15 years of experience." Women and non-binary people make up approximately 14% of game audio professionals

The following table shows the proportion of women among game developers in several countries in 2005 to 2010.

Country	Year	Percentage
Japan	2010	12.8%
Canada	2005	10–15%
Australia	2010	>10%
United States	2005	11.5%
UK	2009	4%

=== Support groups for women in the video game industry ===
==== WIGSIG (Women in Games Special Interest Group) ====
WIGSIG is a special interest group of IDGA (International Game Developers Association). The group was formed in order to foster a positive impact on the game industry regarding gender balance in the workplace and/or marketplace. It provides a community, resources, and opportunities for people in the gaming industry. It also works to assess the numbers of the women in the games industry and tracks the changes of these numbers over time. Additionally, it works to recruit women into the games industry and make the field more attractive to women while providing them with the support and connections they need to be successful.

==== Women in Games International ====
Founded in 2005, Women in Games International (WIGI), made up of both female and male professionals, works to promote the inclusion and advancement of women in the global games industry. WIGI promotes diversity in video game development, publishing, media, education, and workplaces, based on a fundamental belief that increased equality and camaraderie among genders can make global impacts for superior products, more consumer enjoyment, and a stronger gaming industry. Women In Games International stands as strong advocates for issues crucial to the success of women and men in the games industry, including a better work/life balance, healthy working conditions, increased opportunities for success, and resources for career support.

==== WIGJ (Women in Games Jobs) ====
WIGJ is a group that works to recruit, preserve, and provide support for the advancement of women in the games industry by positively and energetically endorsing female role models and providing encouragement and information to women interested in working in the gaming field. The group was incorporated under the UK's Companies Act 2006 on June 2, 2011, as a "not for profit" or Community Interest Company. Companies in the game development industry have, in recent years, been seeking to balance the gender ratios on development teams, and consoles like the Wii and Nintendo DS have seen increased numbers of female players. In addition to using this growing interest in women in the game-developing industry, WIGJ works to put more women in traditional game development with less stigma attached to them. WIGJ seeks to help women find their place within the growing and rewarding field of game development.

=== Treatment of women in the industry ===
Women had generally always been a minority demographic of the video game development community and work in a male-dominated culture; as of 2021, while women make up at least half of all video game players, they represent only about 25% of all developers.

In the early days of video game history among the 1970s and 1980s, due to the more casual nature of relationships between genders due to the Sexual Revolution, many stories had emerged from companies like Atari, Inc. where female employees were treated more as sexual objects than fellow employees. Notable, Atari's founder Nolan Bushnell had been nominated for a Pioneer Award for the 2019 Game Developers Choice Awards, but several advocates came forward to denounce this, given the stories of the sexist atmosphere Bushnell had promoted at Atari. While Bushnell accepted to decline the award and apologized to anyone he may have offended in the past, other former female Atari employees stepped forward to defend Bushnell, stating that they all voluntarily participating in that workplace culture, though acknowledging its acceptability had long since passed.

The 2014 Gamergate controversy brought to light how a minority of gamers perceived female developers, with extended harassment and threats made against several female developers and those that supported them under the guise of "ethics in video games journalism". Coming near the onset of the larger Me Too movement in the 2010s, the Gamergate controversy was seen as a potential prelude to the industry experiencing its own Me Too moment as to come to recognize the hostility that women in the industry often faced. However, by 2018, as recognized by Keza MacDonald of The Guardian, "The video games industry has not yet had its #MeToo moment."

While some individual stories of specific developers being accused of sexual misconduct against female coworkers occurred from 2014 to 2018, the industry saw its first major wide-scale incident occur later in 2018. Riot Games came under review after a Kotaku report that year, based on interviews with a few dozen current and former female employees, that there was a culture of sexism at the company. The investigation led to a class-action lawsuit filed by the employees against Riot, which was eventually settled out of court for $10 million. A separate investigation by California's Department of Fair Employment and Housing (DFEH) found that there was more issues at Riot than previously disclosed, and challenged the settlement arguing that the employees were due a larger compensation for Riot's past behavior as much as $400 million. The class withdrew from the prior settlement and as of February 2021 are continuing to seek legal action against Riot.

The situation at Riot subsequently led to a scenario in August 2019 when several female and non-binary developers separately stepped forward to accuse coworkers and others in the industry of sexual misconduct. The number of accusations was considered a first major turning point of the industry having to deal with long-standing problems of how women were treated by the industry.

In early 2020, several Ubisoft employees accused numerous executives of sexual misconduct and that the company's human resources department did little to respond to internal complaints. Internal reviews of these complaints led to the dismissal of several executives and managing studio directors over 2020 and a commitment by the company to better heed these issues, though the company was still sued by a French labor union group in 2021 as they had found very little had changed within the company as a result of the complaints and subsequent changes.

Activision Blizzard also came under scrutiny by the California DFEH in July 2021, where they filed a legal complaint against the company based on a two-year investigation for maintaining a "frat boy" culture that promoted sexual misconduct against female employees within the company and discouraging promotions of women. Initial responses to the DFEH by current management appeared to dismiss the concerns of the lawsuit, leading to both employees within the company demanding that management treat the complaints as valid, as well as contempt by outside groups against Activision and Blizzard products.

Despite the incidents with Riot and Ubisoft, these had not yet had a larger effect on the industry as of 2021, and generally were dismissed by the larger media, in contrast to stories of sexual misconduct that occurred in film or television in earlier Me Too events. These companies had some turbulent months as these suits or incidents were brought forward but otherwise appeared to try to cover up the situation and return to the status quo as quickly as possible.

== Women in video game streaming ==
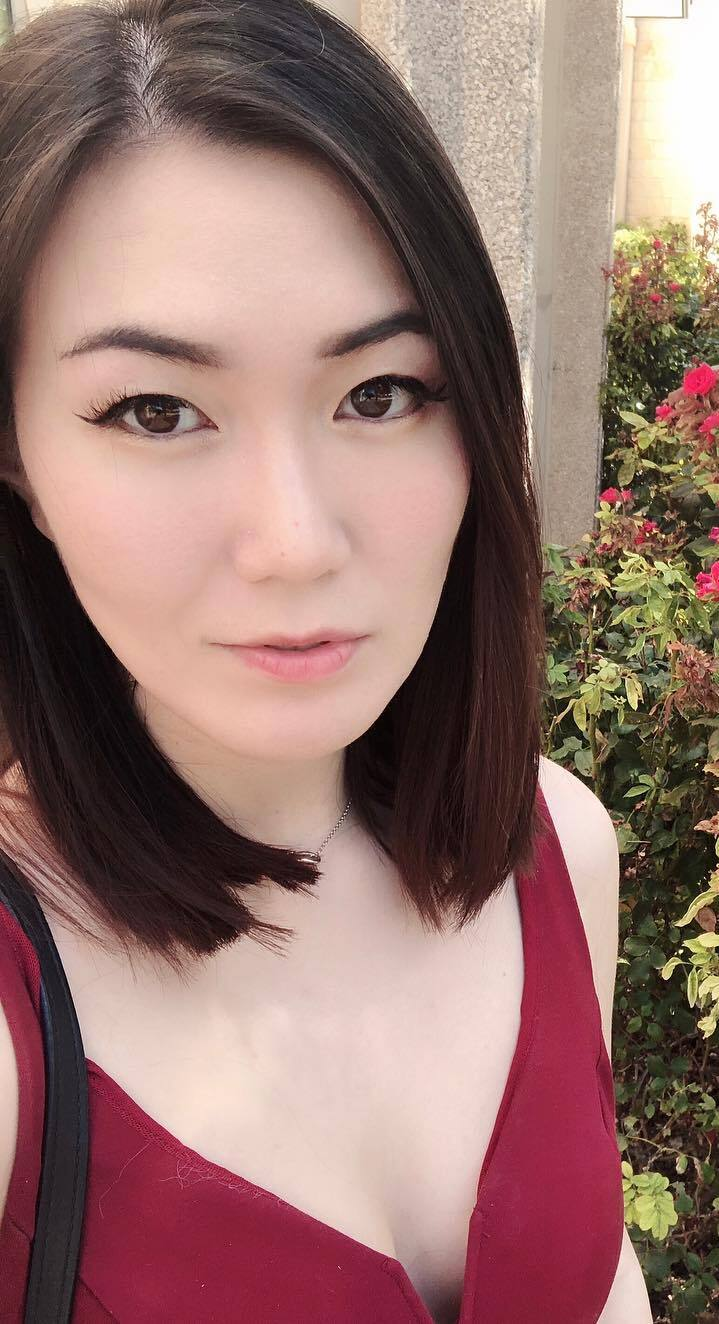
Twitch streamer Hafu (Rumay Wang) in 2018

The relationship between women and video game live streaming has been characterized by various dynamics. With the increasing popularity of streaming platforms such as YouTube and Twitch, female gamers have become more prevalent in this space. Research suggests that women make up 52% of the gaming population, yet they may still be less visible within the dominant gaming culture, possibly due to prevailing stereotypes linking gaming with masculinity.

Stream Hatchet reported that in 2021, of the top 200 streamers, 5% of those were female. Of 3,000 gaming streamers, 27% are female. The top 5 streamers of that year included Amouranth, Valkyrae, Pekora CH., saddummy, and Pokimane.

In March of 2025, streamers Valkyrae, Cinna, and Emiru were approached by a stalking fan. He had threatened them, after asking Emiru to sing and getting denied. The police were unable to find him.

== Gender disparity ==
Critics attribute the seeming lack of female interest in video games to the negative portrayal of women in video games and to misogynistic attitudes common among professional and hardcore gamers. A 2012 Twitter discussion among women working in games, collated under the hashtag #1reasonwhy, argued that sexist practices such as the over-sexualization of female characters, disinterest in topics that matter to women, as well as workplace harassment and unequal pay for men and women were common in the games industry.

Regarding elements of game design, areas such as gameplay, mechanics, and similar features have been described as gender neutral; however, presentational aspects of games have been identified as strongly gender-linked. Specifically, gaming is often seen as fantasy and escapism in which empathy and identification with the character is much more easily achieved if the character shares the same gender as the player. Gamers of both genders tend to crave realism and the more realistic the gender of the character, the easier it is for a player to identify with the character. A 2009 academic study published in New Media & Society, however, found that 85% of playable characters in video games are male. Erin Hamilton argues that part of the problem comes from the difficulty in "juxtaposing femininity and feminism in a good video game." When female characters do appear in video games, they are regarded by some as presenting unhealthy messages concerning unrealistic body images and provocative sexual and violent behaviors for players of both genders. Stereotypical female behaviors such as giggling or sighing are often presented non-ironically, and this might lead young children (especially girls who identify with the female character) to think that this is how girls are supposed to look and act. Furthermore, over-sexualized depictions of scantily clad female video game characters such as Tomb Raider's Lara Croft are not appealing to some girls. However, female players still composed 40% of early Tomb Raider players, and some enjoyed seeing a "beautiful woman who was so powerful and in control."

Although some of the population of male gamers have been the source of harassment towards female gamers and over-sexualization of the characters, many men in the gaming industry agree that there is a problem with female over-sexualization in gaming. There are also male gamers who argue that some of the sexualization of women in video games also applies to men in video games and that portraying a man or woman in a video game in a sexual way can be acceptable if done in the right context. Perceptions about stereotypes concerning gamers themselves also vary among genders, as well as playing frequency of game genres. A study in the Journal of Broadcasting & Electronic Media said that women who play a lot of video games disagree more with stereotypes concerning gender in gaming and are more strongly drawn towards specific gaming genres than men, regardless of the men's gaming frequency.

=== Effects ===
The concept that video games are a form of art has begun to gain force in the latter half of the 2000s, with the U.S. National Endowment for the Arts recognizing games as a form of art in May 2011, for example. In viewing video games as cultural artifacts and the industry as a cultural industry, the disenfranchisement of women from the medium is regarded as negatively impacting the female voice in the industry and the woman's capacity to take part in the cultural dialogue that gaming inspires. From an education perspective, certain gaming genres particularly lacking in female players such as the first-person shooter game have been shown to increase spatial skills thereby giving advantages to players of the games that are currently skewed along gender lines. Video games have also been determined to provide an easy lead-in to computer literacy for children, and correlations have been drawn between male video gaming and the predominance of male workers within the computer industry. With the increasing importance of tech jobs in the 21st century and the increased role of online networking, the lack of female video game players suggests a loss of future career opportunities for women.

Video games have also been used in academic settings to help develop the confidence of young girls in expressing their individual voices online and in their real lives. Video games that promote creative thinking and multiplayer interactions (e.g., Minecraft) have helped young girls to communicate sense of authority and confidence in their social and academic lives.

=== Responses ===
The majority of the people who work on game development teams are men. Researchers have identified that one of the best ways to increase the percentage of female players comes from the aspect of authorship (either in-game as with Neopets and Whyville, or indirectly as with the Harry Potter series' inclusion of Hermione as a playable character subsequent to fan requests). The solution to the problem of societal pigeonholing of female gamers is often identified as interventionist work such as the insertion of women into the industry. Groups like WomenGamers.com and Sony's G.I.R.L. have sought to increase female gamer demographics by giving scholarships to girls considering getting into game development, and game developers like Check Six Games, Her Interactive, Silicon Sisters and Purple Moon have openly courted female coders and developers.

In addressing the future of the medium, many researchers have argued for the improvement of the gaming industry to appeal to a more general gender-neutral audience and others have suggested that the appeal should be directed to women in particular. One of the earliest attempts to broaden the market to include women could be seen in Sega's use of the increased number of female protagonists in fighting games. Other examples of this include games like Mass Effect 3, Remember Me, and The Last of Us, which include a female main character (some optionally). The decision to use strong female characters in important roles, however, is often met with skepticism by marketers concerned with sales. Examination of IGN's "Big Games at E3 2012" and "Big Games at E3 2013" shows growth of the female protagonist in video games, rising 4% from 2012 to 2013. Other efforts outside of making games with female characters have also started to occur. One example is that Women in Games International has teamed up with the Girl Scouts of Greater Los Angeles in order to create a video game patch, which the two organizations hope will encourage Girl Scouts to develop an interest in science, technology, engineering, and math. Activism and specifically female-targeted LAN parties in Scandinavia have helped boost female game playing.

== Women in esports ==
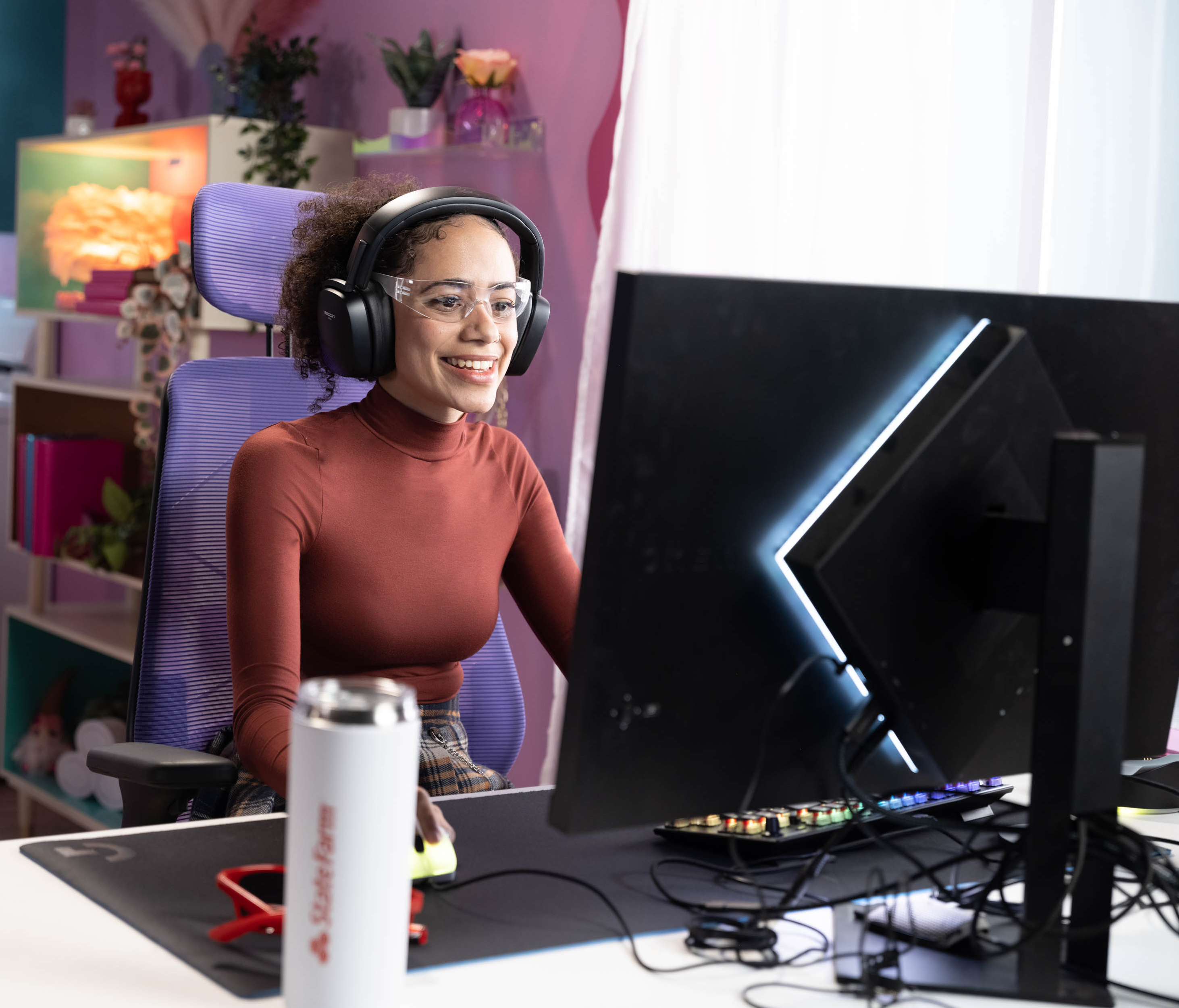
Esports player BlackKrystel in 2023

Gaming has long been seen as a male-dominated hobby. However, 2021 research done by the Entertainment Software Association found that 45% of American gamers are female. There are now a number of professional esports leagues and tournaments that feature female gamers. Some of the most popular esports leagues and tournaments that feature female gamers include:

- The International is an annual Dota 2 tournament that is considered to be the most prestigious esports tournament in the world. In 2019, the tournament featured a female-only team, which was the first time that a female-only team had competed in the tournament.
- The Overwatch League is a professional Overwatch league that features teams from all over the world. In 2020, the league announced that it would be creating a female-only league, which is set to launch in 2023.
- The Call of Duty League is a professional Call of Duty league that features teams from all over the world. In 2021, the league announced that it would be creating a female-only league, which is set to launch in 2022.

== See also ==
- Geek girl
- List of women in the video game industry
- Women in computing
