= Polytechnic University of Coimbra =

The Polytechnical Institute of Coimbra (IPC - Instituto Politécnico de Coimbra) is a public polytechnic institute of higher education in Coimbra, Portugal. It was created by decree of 1979, but its effective start up was only in 1988 through the creation and union of new and former schools. With an enrollment of 10,197 (2008) students, it is the third biggest polytechnic institute of Portugal.

== History ==
The Instituto Politécnico de Coimbra has been in operation since 1988, although some of its current schools were providing degrees independently since the 1970s, and even before some were technical or vocational schools. The agriculture school whose origins can be dated back to the 19th century, and the current engineering institute, formerly an industrial school in operation between 1965 and 1974, were technical schools of intermediate education before had been upgraded to higher education polytechnic institutions. Today, it comprises several autonomous schools in engineering, education, accountancy, health and agriculture.

== Schools and Institutes ==
- School of Agriculture - Escola Superior Agrária de Coimbra (ESAC)
- School of Education - Escola Superior de Educação de Coimbra (ESEC)
- School of Technology and Management of Oliveira do Hospital (located in Oliveira do Hospital) - Escola Superior de Tecnologia e Gestão de Oliveira do Hospital (ESTGOH)
- Coimbra Health School - Escola Superior de Tecnologia da Saúde de Coimbra (ESTeSC)
- Institute of Accounting and Administration - Instituto Superior de Contabilidade e Administração de Coimbra (ISCAC)
- Institute of Engineering - Instituto Superior de Engenharia de Coimbra (ISEC)

== Students' unions and sports ==
The Polytechnical Institute of Coimbra has an independent students' union for each school or institute. The Escola Superior Agrária de Coimbra (agriculture school) has a notable rugby union department.

== Noted alumni ==
- José Sócrates, politician and former Prime-Minister of Portugal. He earned a bacharelato degree from ISEC before its 1988 integration into the Polytechnical Institute of Coimbra.
- Luis de Matos, magician.
- André Sardet, musician and singer. (dropped out)

== See also ==
- List of colleges and universities in Portugal
- Higher education in Portugal
