= Lousada Rugby Clube =

- Full name: Lousada Rugby Clube
- Ground(s): Complexo Desportivo de Lousada
- League(s): Campeonato Nacional de Rugby II Divisão
Team kit

Lousada Rugby Clube is a rugby union team based in Lousada, Portugal. As of the 2012/13 season, they play in the Second Division of the Campeonato Nacional de Rugby (National Championship).
