= Famalicão =

Famalicão may refer to:

== Places ==
- Famalicão (Guarda), a civil parish in the municipality of Guarda
- Famalicão (Nazaré), a civil parish in the municipality of Nazaré
- Vila Nova de Famalicão, a municipality in the district of Braga, Portugal

== Other uses ==
- Famalicão, a documentary film by Manoel de Oliveira about Vila Nova de Famalicão
- F.C. Famalicão, a football club based in Vila Nova de Famalicão
- Clube Rugby Famalicão, a rugby club based in Vila Nova de Famalicão
