= RCO =

RCO may refer to:

- Air Force Rapid Capabilities Office
- Recovery Consistency Objective, in computing
- Refugee-led Community Organisation
- Regional Currency Office
- Remote Communications Outlet
- Rifle combat optic
- Royal College of Organists
- Royal Concertgebouw Orchestra, a Dutch orchestra
- Rugby Clube de Oeiras
