= Taça de Portugal de Rugby Feminino =

- Founded: 2004
- Region: Portugal
- Number of teams: 10
- Current champions: Sporting (2nd title)
- Most successful club(s): Benfica (8 titles)

The Taça de Portugal de Rugby Feminino (English: Women's Portuguese Rugby Cup) is annual Portuguese rugby union competition played by women's rugby teams of Portugal. It started in 2004, as the equivalent knock-out competition to the men's Portuguese Rugby Cup and is run by the Portuguese Rugby Federation. Initially played by 15 players, from 2009 that number fluctuated between 13 and 15. Starting in 2013, its only played by the Sevens variant.

Since its first edition the competition has been dominated by Benfica, who won it on eight occasions. Its major opponent was initially Agrária, playing five finals with them; after 2012 Técnico emerged as biggest challenger and more recently, Sporting.

== History ==
The Women's Portuguese Rugby Cup was created in 2004, following the rapid growth of women's rugby in Portugal at the start of the 21st century. With the first nationwide league created just four years earlier, there was a need for an annual cup competition that mimics the men's tournament, the Portuguese Rugby Cup. Its inaugural winner was Benfica who beat Agrária by 5–0. Agrária revenged that loss in the following year, defeating Benfica by 7–3. In the third year of competition, the two clubs met in the quarter-finals and Agrária beat them again. After knocking out Técnico in the semis, Agrária outpaced CDUP in the final by 22–0 on 14 April 2007, lifting their second trophy. The 2007-08 Final was a re-edition of the first two seasons, opposing Agrária against Benfica. Agrária eliminated CRAV and Agronomia, while Benfica beat RC Lousã and Técnico, in the quarter and semi-final, respectively. On 23 February 2008, on the Estádio Universitário de Lisboa, Benfica won 17–10, conquering their first trophy in 3 years. They retained it in 2008–09, after beating CDUP by 11–0 in the final. The sixth season was again disputed by the same two clubs who dominate the competition, Benfica and Agrária. After the first beat Técnico and the latter defeat CDUP in the semis, they met in Abrantes on 27 March 2010, with Benfica winning 22–0 in the fourth final between them. In 2010–11, the competition was expanded to Rugby sevens variant. On the standard format with 13 players, Benfica played their fourth consecutive final, after beating Agronomia in the semis by 51–0. They went against Técnico, who defeat Agrária by 20–10. At the Complexo Desportivo Caldas Rainha on 2 April 2011, Benfica won 21–5, extending their reign to five wins. The eighth edition was for a fifth time, decided between Benfica and Agrária. After eliminating Técnico, Benfica successfully defended their trophy on 18 February 2012, with a 27–0 win against Agrária. The streak of five consecutive wins was finally stopped in 2012–13, when Técnico beat them 14–10 on 19 March 2013.

Starting in 2013, the competition has been exclusively for the Sevens variant. The new format split the qualifying stage in three regions, to determine a top four and bottom four. Benfica and Técnico were again the finalists after beating SC Porto and Agrária, respectively. On 8 March 2014, in Campo da Moita, Benfica revenged the loss of 2013 by beating Técnico for 29–7. The two clubs continued their contend in the next edition final, played on 14 March 2015. This time, the win fell to Técnico after beating Benfica by 14–12. In 2015–16, a new competitor appeared, Sporting, who met their cross-town rivals Benfica, on 7 May 2016, losing 27–0. Sporting would go on to win their first trophy in the competition in 2016–17 after beating Sport Rugby by 36–19. They retained the trophy in the following year after beating Benfica by 14–12.

== Taça de Portugal finals ==
Season	Winner	Score	Runner-up
2004–05	Benfica	5–0	Agrária
2005–06	Agrária	7–3	Benfica
2006–07	Agrária (2)	22–0	CDUP
2007–08	Benfica (2)	17–0	Agrária
2008–09	Benfica (3)	11–0	CDUP
2009–10	Benfica (4)	22–0	Agrária
2010–11	Benfica (5)	21–5	Técnico
2011–12	Benfica (6)	27–0	Agrária
2012–13	Técnico	14–10	Benfica
2013–14	Benfica (7)	29–7	Técnico
2014–15	Técnico (2)	14–12	Benfica
2015–16	Benfica (8)	27–0	Sporting CP
2016–17	Sporting CP (1)	36–19	SC Porto
2017–18	Sporting CP (2)	14–12	Benfica
2018–19	Sporting CP (3)	31–0	Benfica
2019–20	Sporting CP (4)	28–5	Benfica
2020–21	-	-	-
2021–22	Sporting CP (5)	20–10	Agrária
2022–23	Sport CP/CRAV/Braga (1)	15–14	Sporting CP
2023–24			

=== Performance By Club ===
Club	Winners	Runners-up	Years won	Years runner-up
Benfica	8	6	2005, 2008, 2009, 2010, 2011, 2012, 2014, 2016	2006, 2013, 2015, 2018, 2019, 2020
Sporting	5	2	2017, 2018, 2019, 2020, 2022	2016, 2023
Agrária	2	5	2006, 2007	2005, 2008, 2010, 2012, 2022
Técnico	2	2	2013, 2015	2011, 2014
Sport CP/CRAV/Braga	1	0	2023	—
CDUP	0	2	—	2007, 2009
SC Porto	0	1	—	2017
