= Rugby da Universidade de Aveiro =

- Full name: Rugby da Universidade de Aveiro
- Coach(es): Marc Hadden
- League(s): Campeonato Nacional de Rugby II Divisão
Team kit

Rugby da Universidade de Aveiro is a rugby team based in Aveiro, Portugal. As of the 2012/13 season, they play in the Second Division of the Campeonato Nacional de Rugby (National Championship). The club is the official rugby team of the University of Aveiro.
