= Durão =

Durão is a surname. Notable people with the surname include:

- José Manuel Durão Barroso (born 1956), Portuguese politician and 115th Prime Minister of Portugal (2002–2004) and 11th President of the European Commission (2004–2014)
- Joaquim Durão (1930–2015), Portuguese chess player
- Nuno Durão (born 1962), Portuguese rugby union footballer and coach
- Santa Rita Durão (1722–1784), orator and poet, creator of 'Indianism' in Brazil
