= Sporting CP (rugby union) =

- Full name: Sporting Clube de Portugal
- Ground: Estádio Universitário de Lisboa (Capacity: 8,000)
- President: Frederico Varandas
- League: Campeonato Nacional de Rugby I Divisão
Team kit

Sporting Clube de Portugal is a rugby team based in Lisbon, Portugal.

During the 2012/13 season, they played in the II Divisão (2nd Division-3rd Portuguese tier) of the Campeonato Nacional de Rugby (National Championship), ending the season as 2nd division champions and winning promotion to the 1ª Divisão" (1st Division-2nd Portuguese tier) for the 2013/2014 season.

== Honours ==
=== Domestic Competitions ===
- Campeonato Nacional de Rugby II Divisão: 1

2012/2013

=== Domestic Competitions ===
- Campeonato Nacional de Rugby Feminino: 10
  - Rugby Union: 3

2020/2021, 2021/2022, 2022/2023

  - Rugby League: 1

2019/2020

  - Rugby Sevens: 5

2016/2017, 2017/2018, 2018/2019, 2020/2021, 2022/2023

  - Rugby Tens: 1

2018/2019

- Taça de Portugal de Rugby Feminino: 6
  - Rugby Union: 2

2021/2022, 2023/2024

  - Rugby Sevens: 1

2016/2017

  - Rugby Tens: 3

2017/2018, 2018/2019, 2019/2020

  - Supertaça de Portugal de Rugby Feminino: 4
  - Rugby Union: 2

2020/2021, 2022/2023

  - Rugby Tens: 2

2018/2019, 2019/2020

=== International Competitions ===
- Iberian Cup (Rugby Union): 2

2018, 2019

== Notable Former Players ==
=== Internationals ===
- (Portugal) Cesário Cruz, 2 caps (1935, 1936)
- (Portugal) Vasco Cayola, 1 cap (1935)
- (Portugal) Douglas Raws, 1 cap (1936)
