= Belas =

Belas may refer to:

- Belas, Luanda, a municipality in Angola
- Belas, a locality of the Queluz e Belas civil parish in the municipality of Sintra, Portugal
  - Belas Rugby Clube, a rugby union club
- Praia de Belas, a neighbourhood in Porto Alegre, Brazil
- the Lombard-language name for Bellagio, Lombardy, Italy
