= Sireli Bobo =

Fiji international rugby union player (born 1976)

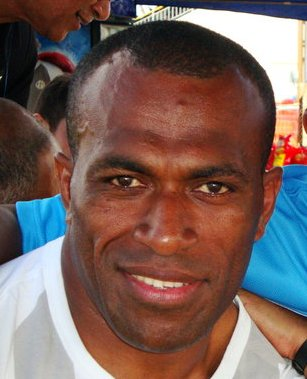
- Born: Isireli Bobo; 28 January 1976 (age 50) Rakiraki, Fiji
- Height: 1.90 m (6 ft 3 in)
- Weight: 99 kg (15 st 8 lb)

Rugby union career
- Position: Wing
Senior career
Years	Team	Apps	(Points)
1993–1994	Yalalevu		
1994–97	Vatukoula		
1998–99	Suva Police		
1999	Natuicake		
1999–2000	Cascais		
2001–02	UCM Canoe		
2003	Tailevu Police		
2003–04	Wellington	23	(60)
2004–2005	Parma		
2005–07	Biarritz	54	(150)
2007–2013	Racing Métro	130	(237)
2013-14	Red Hurricanes	7	(10)
2014-2015	La Rochelle	33	(50)
2015	Toulon	6	(15)
2015-16	Pau	7	(5)
- Correct as of 9 January 2016
Super Rugby
Years	Team	Apps	(Points)
2004	Hurricanes	5	(0)
International career
Years	Team	Apps	(Points)
2004–	Fiji	16	(45)
2004	Pacific Islanders	3	(10)
- Correct as of 22 June 2014
National sevens team
Years	Team		Comps
1998–2005	Fiji		7

Isireli Bobo (born 28 January 1976), is a Fijian rugby union footballer.

== Early career ==
Early in his career, he played for Grupo Dramático e Sportivo Cascais, a Portuguese team. He was in the Nawaqavesi 7s and was subsequently picked to play at the Japan 7s in 1998. He also played with the Fiji sevens side at the Dubai and Durban sevens circuits. He then signed with Spanish club UCM Canoe, and the side went on to win the King's Cup in the 2001 season.

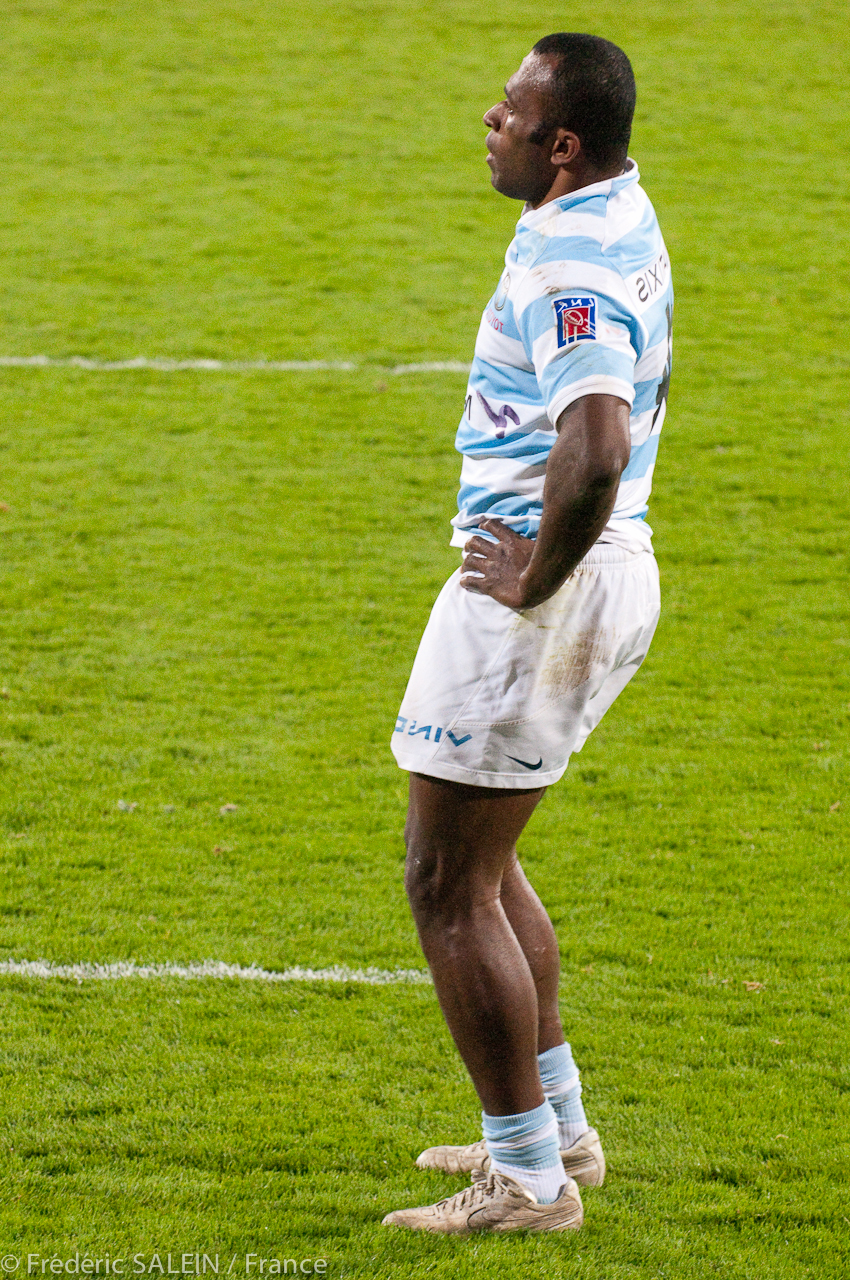
Sireli Bobo playing for Racing Metro in 2010

He returned to Fiji for the 2002 season and went on to captain the sevens side in 2003, as well as becoming a try-scoring machine; scoring 22 in just three tournaments.

== 2003–2010 ==
He subsequently signed with Wellington for the National Provincial Championship (NPC). He played 13 matches for the Wellington club, scoring seven tries. He then was called up to the Super 12, and played five games for the Hurricanes.

He made his international debut for Fiji on 5 June 2004 in a match against Tonga in Nuku'alofa which Fiji won by one point, 27 to 26, with Bobo scoring the winning try. He earned his second cap for Fiji on 12 June in the win over Samoa. In July he played four times for the Pacific Islanders team (a combination of the best Fijian, Samoan and Tongan footballers).

He scored a try for Biarritz Olympique in the 2005–06 Heineken Cup final against Munster, though Biarritz eventually lost the final 23 points to 19. However, Biarritz made it to the final of the 2005–06 Top 14 as well, and were victorious against Toulouse, with Bobo scoring one of Biarritz's tries. He finished the season as Biarritz's top try scorer, and second in the overall competition. In 2007 Bobo signed for Racing Métro and was called up -as a reserve- to the Fiji 2007 Rugby World Cup squad, playing in the quarter final loss to the eventual winners South Africa.

== 2010–present ==
In June 2013, he heeded the call of his nation by joining the team for the 2013 IRB Pacific Nations Cup, In the first minute of their game against Japan, he made a break passing the ball onto his winger, Adriu Delai who ran 20 metres and passed it to him to score. He could not travel to Canada due to visa delays but was instrumental in Fiji's next 2 games and in their last game against Tonga, he ran 60 metres to score Fiji's first try and helped Fiji win the PNC for the very first time. He signed a contract with a Japanese club, NTT DoCoMo Red Hurricanes for 5 years which means he will play for the club till the age of 42.

On 14 June 2014, he became the oldest player ever to represent Fiji when he ran onto the field at 38 years and 137 days old against Tonga.

He left Japan and joined Top 14 side La Rochelle in late 2014. After a successful season, he retired from Rugby at the end of the season only to be recalled again by Top 14 Giants, Toulon as a 'medical joker' for the duration of the 2015 Rugby World Cup in which he scored 3 tries in 5 games and on 1 November, newly promoted club Pau signed him on from Toulon for the remainder of the 2015–16 Top 14 season.
