= André Sardet =

Portuguese singer and musician

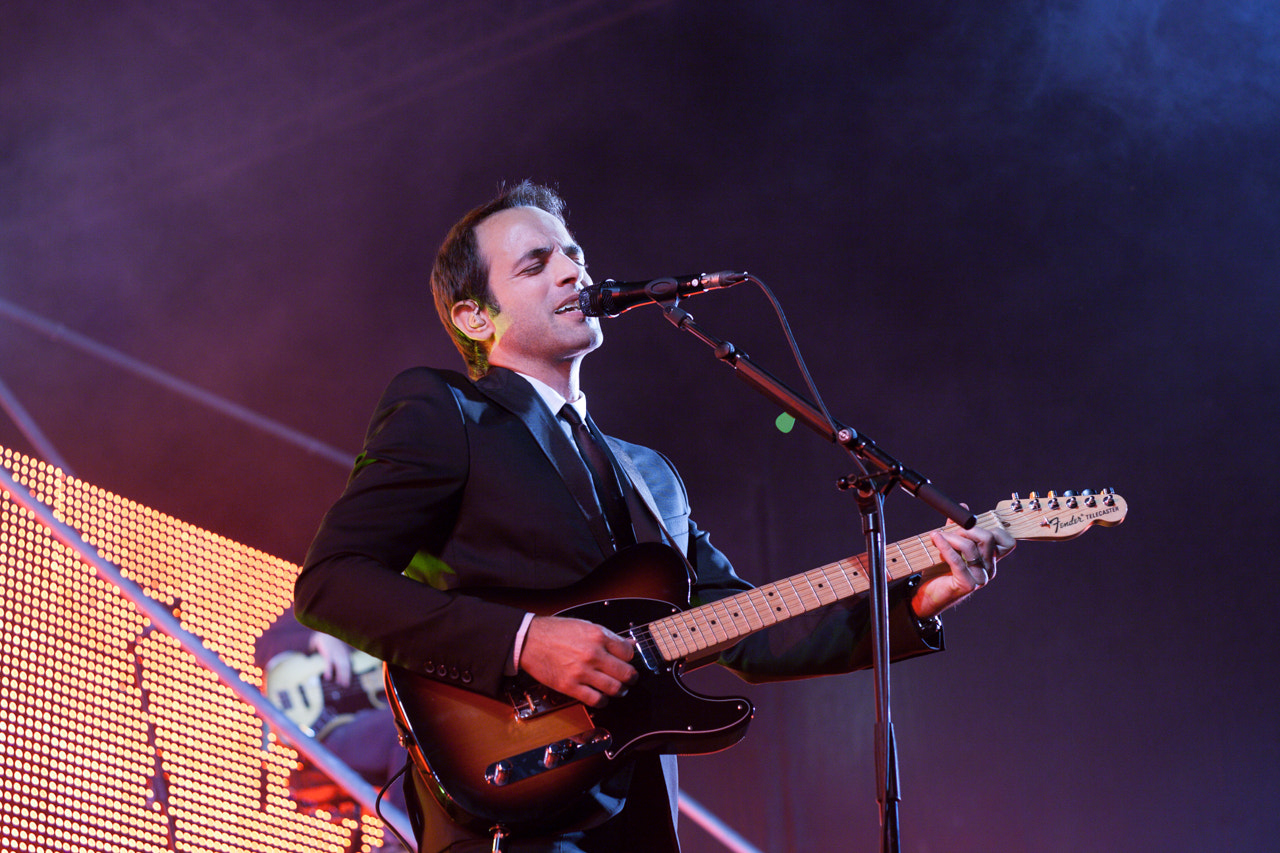
Andre Miraldo Sardet on stage

André Miraldo Sardet Pires is a Portuguese singer and musician, born in the city of Coimbra on 8 January 1976. Acústico (2006), his most successful work, sold over 120,000 copies and was recorded live at Associação Académica de Coimbra's Teatro Académico de Gil Vicente, in Coimbra. "Foi feitiço" is among his best known hits.

== Personal life ==
André Sardet started his singing career at 19 years old. He attended a mechanical technical engineering course at the Instituto Superior de Engenharia de Coimbra (ISEC), but dropped out in order to pursue his career in music. Sardet is married with children, living with his family in Coimbra. His surname, Sardet, is uncommon in Portuguese and comes from a great-grandfather, a French conductor who migrated to Portugal.

== Discography ==
=== Albums ===
- Imagens (1996)
- Agitar Antes de Usar (1998)
- André Sardet (album) (2002)
- Acústico (2006 live album)
- Mundo de Cartão (2008)
- Mundo de Cartão ao vivo (2009 live album)
- Pára, escuta e olha (2011)
