= Guimarães Rugby UFC =

Portuguese rugby union team, based in Guimarães

- Full name: Guimarães Rugby Union Football Club
- Founded: 3 November 2008; 17 years ago
- Ground: Pista de Atletismo Gémeos Castro (Capacity: 1,200)
- President: Paulo Ribeiro
- Coach: Jeremias Soares
- League: Campeonato Nacional de Rugby I Divisão
1st kit	2nd kit

Guimarães Rugby UFC is a rugby team based in Guimarães, Portugal. The club was founded on 3 November 2008 and play at home at the Pista de Atletismo Gémeos Castro.

== History ==
From the 2012-13 season until 2016-17, the team competed in the Second Division of the Campeonato Nacional de Rugby (National Championship), having secured promotion after becoming national champions in that last season.

Therefore, from the 2017-18 season onwards, they compete in the First Division of the National Rugby Championship.

== Honours ==
Campeonato Nacional de Rugby II Divisão:

- Winner (1): 2016-17
