= Rugby Clube de Oeiras =

Portuguese rugby union club, based in Oeiras

(Portugal) Rugby Clube de Oeiras
- Nickname: RCO
- Founded: 30 July 2001; 24 years ago
- Location: Oeiras, Portugal
- Coach: (Portugal) Tiago Ataíde
- League: Campeonato Nacional de Rugby II Divisão
- 2011–2012: 5th
Team kit

Official website
- www.facebook.com/RugbyOeiras

Rugby Clube de Oeiras, commonly known as RCO, is a rugby team based in Oeiras, Portugal. They currently play in the Campeonato Nacional de Rugby II Divisão (the third division of the Portuguese National Championship). The senior team usually plays their home matches at the rugby complex at the Estádio Nacional (National Stadium). RCO's biggest sporting achievement came in the 2002/2003 season, when they were crowned champions of what was then the old format of the National Second Division B. As of August 2012 RCO finished 5th overall in the Campeonato Nacional de Rugby II Divisão, the best ranking the team has ever achieved in its history. Rugby Clube de Oeiras also finished 5th in the Torneio Nacional de Sevens, the 2nd division equivalent of the national Seven's tournament. The club is of September 2012 preparing its 2012/13 season which starts in October.

- Season: Position
2007–2008	9th
2008–2009	13th
2009–2010	13th
2010–2011	9th
2011–2012	5th

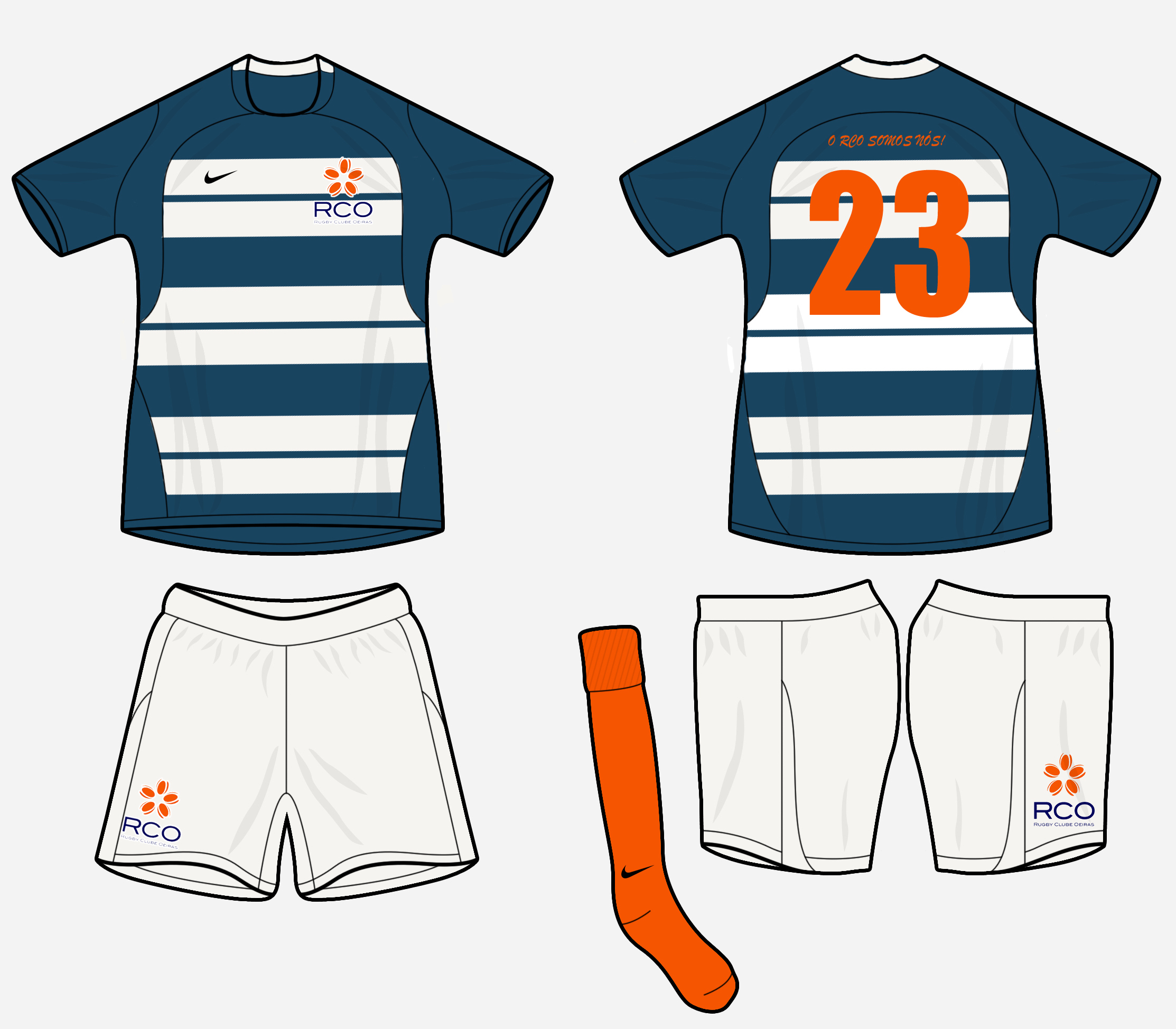
Equipamento de Jogo 2012-2013
