= Campeonato Nacional de Rugby Feminino =

Portuguese top division of women's rugby

- Sport: Rugby union Sevens
- Founded: 2000; 2003
- No. of teams: 5
- Country: Portugal
- Most recent champions: Union: Benfica (5h title); Sevens: Sporting (2nd title)
- Most titles: Union: Benfica and Agrária (5 titles each); Sevens: Agrária (7 titles)

The Campeonato Nacional de Rugby Feminino (English: National championship of Women's rugby) is the Portuguese top division of women's rugby. It is organised by the Portuguese Rugby Federation and was created in 2000, to fill the need of a women's league. Its inaugural winner was Pescadores da Costa da Caparica, who dominated the league alongside Agrária for the first five years. In 2007, Benfica broke their dominion and won three titles in a row, with Técnico stopping them in 2010. After another win for Benfica, Agrária won their fifth title in 2012, with Benfica matching that number in the competition last edition.

Since 2013, the league is only played in the rugby sevens variant, known as Circuito Nacional de Sevens Feminino. It started in 2003 and usually occurred after the rugby union season ended. Agrária dominated the competition until 2009, when Benfica won their first. They won four more titles, before being stopped by arch-rivals Sporting, who won back-to-back titles in 2016–17 and 2017-18.

== History ==
The first year of an organised women's rugby league was only 2000–01, over 40 years later than their male counterpart. The first winners were Pescadores da Costa de Caparica from Almada. A year later, Pescadores narrowly lost the title to Agrária, who finished a point ahead. The third season was completely dominated by Agrária, after they won all of their matches. In 2003–04, the league changed in a different format with two groups, North and South, to determine the best four and the bottom four. In the championship playoff, Pescadores won all of their matches, taking the title out of Agrária. However, the students from the Escola Superior Agrária de Coimbra returned to the right path in 2004–05, beating Benfica by two points at the championship playoff. Agrária retained their title in the following year, before Benfica won their first league title in 2006–07. In the eighth edition, the competition last stages changed from championship playoff to a Final Four, similar to other sports. On 26 January 2008, Benfica beat Agrária 21–3 to win their second consecutive title. They retain their league title in 2008–09, but in the following year, a new winner emerged: Técnico. It was the first team to break the decade-long reign of Agrária, Benfica and Pescadores. After losing the championship to Técnico the year before, Benfica dominated 2010–11, winning all of their matches and finishing with a 12-point lead. In 2011–12, Agrária won their first league title in six seasons. Although they ended level on points with Benfica, they received two more bonus points than Benfica. In what would be the last year of the competition in the traditional format played by 15 players, Benfica had another overwhelming season, winning all of their games, and conquering their fifth title.

Starting in 2013, the league has only been played in rugby sevens. This variant was first played in 2003–04, and its first six seasons were all won by Agrária. In 2009–10, Benfica was the second team to win the Circuito Nacional de Sevens Feminino, with Agrária regaining it in the following year. After one-off win by Técnico in 2011–12, Benfica won their second title in 2013, beating Técnico by 22–0. Since then, Benfica added two more league titles in 2014 and 2015, first beating SC Porto, and then Técnico. In 2016, Benfica completed the three-peat, remaining as the most dominant team of the past four years. After four years, Benfica was stopped by new contenders, Sporting, who won their first league title in 2016–17. A year later, Sporting retained their title, matching Benfica for points, but having more conversions.

== Winners ==
Year	Variant	
Year	Variant	Winner
2000–01	Rugby union	Pescadores da Costa da Caparica
2001–02	Rugby union	Agrária
2002–03	Rugby union	Agrária (2)
2003–04	Rugby union	Pescadores da Costa da Caparica (2)
2003–04	Sevens	Agrária
2004–05	Rugby union	Agrária (3)
2004–05	Sevens	Agrária (2)
2005–06	Rugby union	Agrária (4)
2005–06	Sevens	Agrária (3)
2006–07	Rugby union	Benfica
2006–07	Sevens	Agrária (4)
2007–08	Rugby union	Benfica (2)
2007–08	Sevens	Agrária (5)
2008–09	Rugby union	Benfica (3)
2008–09	Sevens	Agrária (6)
2009–10	Rugby union	Técnico
2009–10	Sevens	Benfica
2010–11	Rugby union	Benfica (4)
2010–11	Sevens	Agrária (7)
2011–12	Rugby union	Agrária (5)
2011–12	Sevens	Técnico
2012–13	Rugby union	Benfica (5)
2012–13	Sevens	Benfica (2)
2013–14	Sevens	Benfica (3)
2014–15	Sevens	Benfica (4)
2015–16	Sevens	Benfica (5)
2016–17	Sevens	Sporting (1)
2017–18	Sevens	Sporting (2)

== Performance by Club ==
=== Rugby union ===
Club	Titles	Years won
Agrária	5	2002, 2003, 2005, 2006, 2012
Benfica	5	2007, 2008, 2009, 2011, 2013
Pescadores da Costa da Caparica	2	2001, 2004
Técnico	1	2010

=== Sevens ===
Club	Titles	Years won
Agrária	7	2004, 2005, 2006, 2007, 2008, 2009, 2011
Benfica	4	2010, 2013, 2014, 2015, 2016
Sporting	2	2017, 2018
Técnico	1	2012
