= Campeonato Nacional de Rugby II Divisão =

Rugby league in Portugal

- Sport: Rugby union
- No. of teams: 18
- Country: Portugal
- Most recent champion: CR Técnico

The Campeonato Nacional de Rugby II Divisão is the third tier of the Portuguese Rugby League. It consists in regional groups (3 groups in 2023-24: 1 in the north (7 clubs) and 2 in the south - South 1 (5 clubs) and South 2 (6 clubs)).

== Season 2023-24 teams ==
Group North

- Académica "A"
- Agrária
- Douro Rugby
- ER Porto
- Sport CP
- Tondela
- Trofa/Famalicão

Group South 1

- Alcochetense
- Belenenses "B"
- Direito "B"
- ER Galiza
- Vila da Moita

Group South 2

- Belas RC
- Dark Horses
- Elvas
- Oeiras
- São Miguel "A"
- Sporting CP

== Champions ==
Season	Champion	Runner-ip	3rd Place
1977-78	Clube de Rugby São Miguel	NA	NA
1978 to 1981	Not held
1981-82	CRAV	NA	NA
1982 to 2003	Not held
2003-04	Caldas RC	Universidade de Aveiro	RC Loulé
2004-05	AEFC Tecnologia	RC Loulé	RC Bairrada
2005-06	Belas RC	RC Montemor	AEES Agrária de Coimbra
2006-07	AEES Agrária de Coimbra	Vitória de Setúbal	RC Montemor
2007-08	Vitória de Setúbal	Rugby Linha	RC Montemor
2008-09	Rugby Linha	RC Montemor	Associação Prazer de Jogar Rugby
2009-10	RC Montemor	Caldas RC	RC Bairrada
2010-11	CR Técnico	RC Santarém	AEES Agrária de Coimbra
2011-12	AEES Agrária de Coimbra	RC Loulé	AEFC Tecnologia
2012-13	Sporting CP	Clube de Rugby São Miguel	CR Famalicão & Guimarães Rugby UFC
2013-14	Rugby Vila da Moita	Guimarães Rugby UFC	AEFC Tecnologia & CR Famalicão
2014-15	CR Técnico	Guimarães Rugby UFC	RC Bairrada & AEFC Tecnologia
2015-16	RC Bairrada	Guimarães Rugby UFC	RC Loule & AEFC Tecnologia
2016-17	Guimarães Rugby UFC	RC Loulé	AEES Agrária de Coimbra & Belas RC

== See also ==
- Rugby union in Portugal
