= Rugby Clube de Elvas =

Portuguese rugby union club, based in Elvas

Elvas
- Full name: Rugby Clube de Elvas
- Ground: Estádio Atletismo Elvas
- League: Campeonato Nacional de Rugby II Divisão
Team kit

Rugby Clube de Elvas is a rugby team based in Elvas, Portugal. As of the 2012/13 season, they play in the Second Division of the Campeonato Nacional de Rugby (National Championship).
