= Clube Rugby Famalicão =

- Full name: Clube Rugby Famalicão
- Ground(s): Estádio Municipal Vila Nova de Famalicão
- League(s): Campeonato Nacional de Rugby II Divisão
Team kit

Clube Rugby Famalicão is a rugby team based in Vila Nova de Famalicão, Portugal. As of the 2012/13 season, they play in the Second Division of the Campeonato Nacional de Rugby (National Championship).
