= School of Technology and Management of Oliveira do Hospital =

Coordinates: 40°21′39″N 7°51′40″W

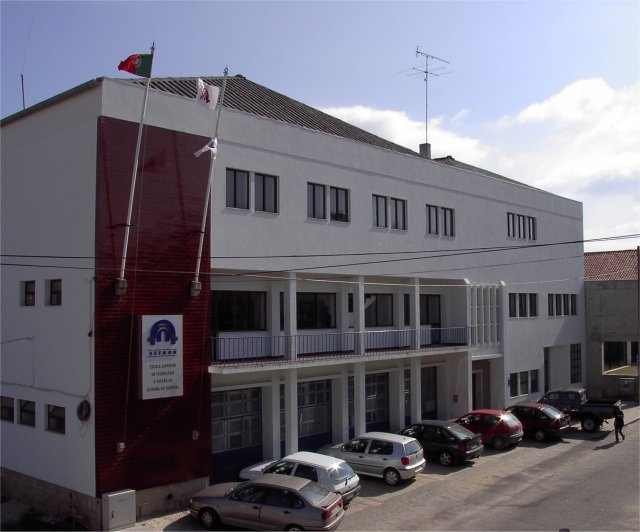
An image of School of Technology and Management of Oliveira do Hospital

The School of Technology and Management of Oliveira do Hospital (Escola Superior de Tecnologia e Gestão de Oliveira do Hospital - ESTGOH) is a Higher Education School in Portugal, an organic unit of the Polytechnical Institute of Coimbra. Is located in Oliveira do Hospital, and offers courses in management and engineering.
