= Rugby Vila da Moita =

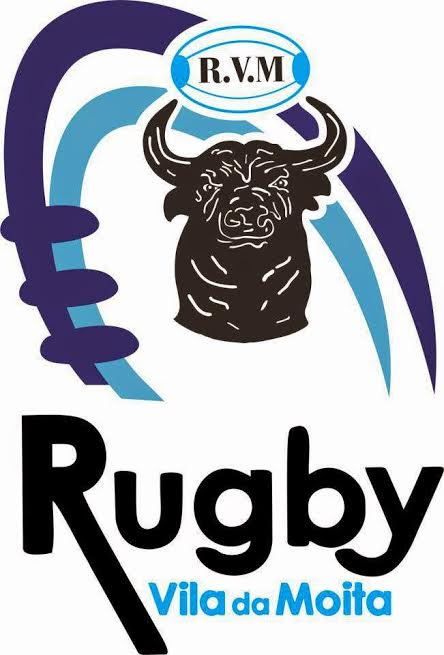
- Full name: Rugby Vila da Moita
- Founded: 2007
- Ground(s): Campo D. Luis Roberto Saldanha - Gaio, Portugal
- President: Válter Jorge Rodrigues
- Coach: Nuno Rodrigues
- League: Campeonato Nacional de Rugby I Divisão
Team kit

Rugby Vila da Moita is a rugby team based in Moita, Portugal, that started in 2007 after the Portuguese National Rugby team was qualified for the RWC 2007 (Rugby World Cup 2007) as the first amateur team to pass through the group phase of the competition.

As of the 2014/15 season, they play in the First Division of the Campeonato Nacional de Rugby (National Championship) until the present day.

== Achievements ==
Season 2010/2011 - Champion of "Rugby 7's Emergentes"

Season 2012/2013 - Champion of "Circuito Nacional Rugby 7's"

Season 2013/2014 - Champion of "Campeonato Nacional de Rugby 1 ª Divisão"

Season 2013/2014 - Champion of "Circuito Nacional Rugby 7's"

Season 2017/2018 - 2nd Place of "GLS Algarve 7's"

Season 2012/2013 - champion of €:&:&

== Digital Channels ==
- Website: www.rvmoita.pt
- Facebook
- Instagram
- Youtube
- Twitter
