= Instituto Superior de Engenharia de Coimbra =

Coimbra Higher Institute of Engineering
- Instituto Superior de Engenharia de Coimbra
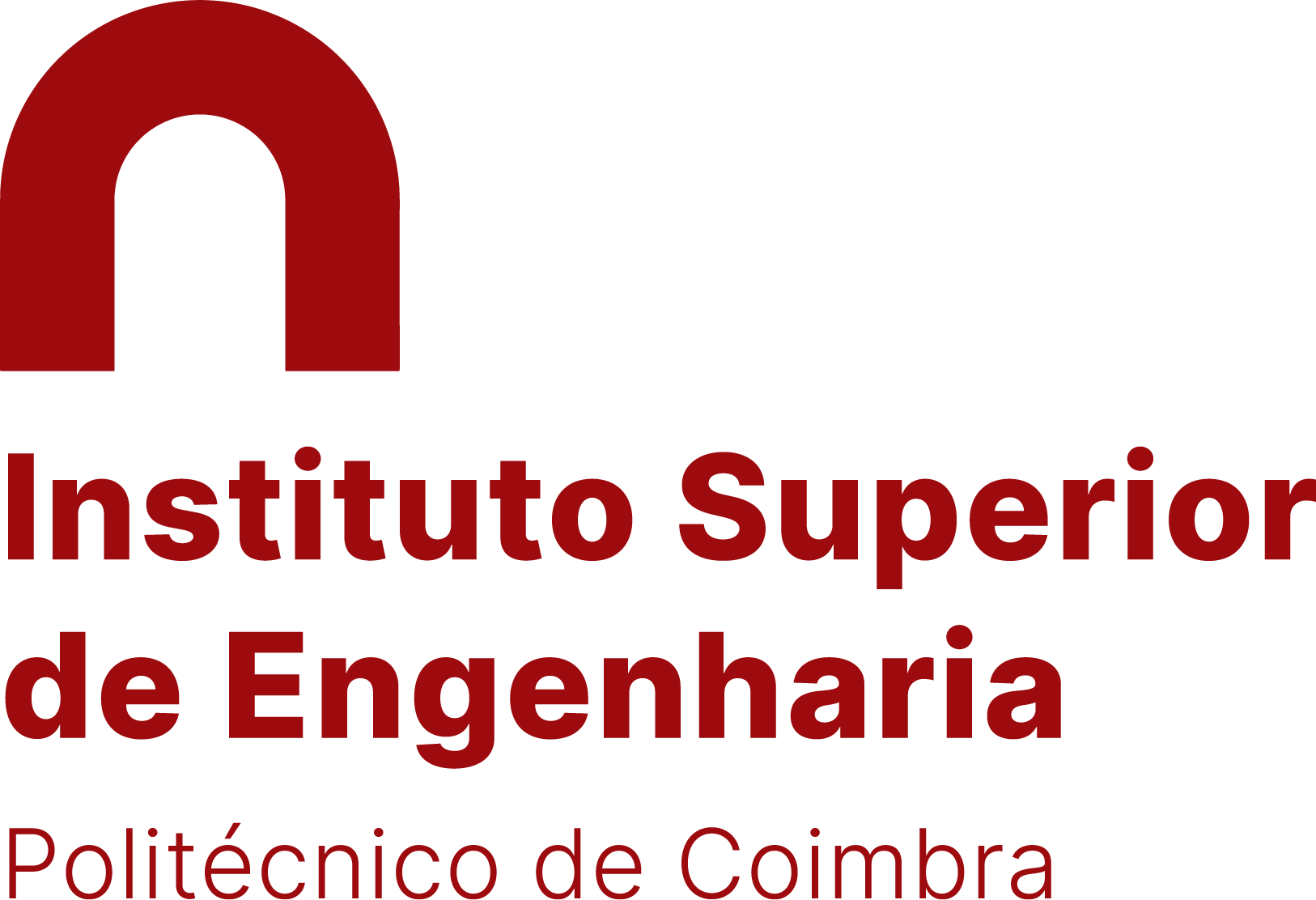
- Former names: Instituto Industrial e Comercial de Coimbra
- Motto: Engenharia com futuro (Portuguese)
- Motto in English: Engineering with future
- Type: Public
- Established: 5 December 1921
- Affiliations: Polytechnic Institute of Coimbra
- President: Mário Velindro
- Vice-president: Maria do Céu Faulhaber and Matias Lopes
- Academic staff: 174 (2016)
- Students: 2636 (2016)
- Undergraduates: 2007 (2016)
- Postgraduates: 388 (2016)
- Location: Coimbra, Portugal; 40.1924°N 8.4104°W
- Campus: Urban
Colours
- Website: www.isec.pt

The Instituto Superior de Engenharia de Coimbra (ISEC) is a higher education polytechnic institution of engineering, based in Coimbra, Portugal. It belongs to the Polytechnic Institute of Coimbra, although with a great level of administrative, financial, and pedagogic autonomy.

== History ==
Its origins backs to the creation of the Industrial Institute of Coimbra (Instituto Industrial de Coimbra) created in September 1965 as a non-higher education institute of vocational education.

With the approval of decree "Decreto-Lei 830/74", of 31 December 1974, the Industrial Institute of Coimbra remodeled to what it is now known as Coimbra Institute of Engineering, (ISEC) "Instituto Superior de Engenharia Coimbra". According to that decree all superior institutes of engineering were of university level, they were allowed to award bachelors, masters and doctorates. However, at the time ISEC only conferred bachelors in Civil Engineering, Electrical Engineering, Mechanical Engineering, Chemistry Engineering, with 8 semesters (4 years).

Its status was changed from university when it was integrated into the polytechnic subsector in 1988 through the decree "Decreto-Lei nº389/88", of 25 of October", and incorporated into the newly created Polytechnical Institute of Coimbra. It remodeled all courses to a 6 semesters (3 years) bacharelato degrees in several technical engineering specializations, until the late 1990s. In 1989 new courses were created, Computer Sciences Engineering and in 1991 Electromechanical Engineering was introduced. At this time new legal decrees were adopted by Portuguese State (Administrative Rule 413A/98 of 17 July 1998), and it started to award 3 + 2 licenciaturas bietápicas (bacharelato plus one or two extra years, conferring the licenciatura degree - a degree that had been awarded exclusively by the universities). In the mid-2000s ISEC adopted new more selective admission rules which were imposed to every Portuguese higher education institution by the State.

In 2006 Biological Engineering was introduced already according to Bologna Process, awarding the degree of "licenciatura" bachelors (3 years). After 2006, with the approval of new legislation and the Bologna Process, ISEC, like any other polytechnic or university institution of Portugal, is legally able to provide a first 3-year study cycle, known as licenciatura plus a second 2-year cycle which confer the master's degree (in some cases this higher degree may be awarded in cooperation with a partner university) . This late changes were gradually developed, the curricula of many courses were deeply changed, other courses were discontinued (like now defunct ISEC's polytechnic degree in chemical engineering). In 2007 Biomedical Engineering and Industrial Management Engineering were introduced. Nowadays nine bachelors according to the Declaration of Bologna are fully functional.

== Library ==
The institute's library occupies the main floor of the Interdisciplinary Building. It provides a main reading room with seating capacity for 230 individuals. In addition, several group study rooms are available for 30 users. The library also provides access to Hemerotheca archives containing 100 volumes of specialized published periodicals organized in alphabetical order of the work's title.

== Facts and figures ==
- Degree types awarded: bachelor degree and masters' degree in engineering-related subjects
- ISEC has night classes for workers which is a characteristic of most polytechnic institutions in Portugal

== Activities ==
Feira de Engenharia de Coimbra (FENGE) is an initiative organized by the AEISEC (Students' Association of ISEC). The objective is to provide an opportunity to share experiences between companies in the fields of engineering and the student community.

In most recent times ISEC-DEIS (Computer Science Department) has organised another leading activity called HandsOn@Deis, it brings companies of the Information Technology sector in direct contact with students, creating workshops and activities.

== Students' Association ==
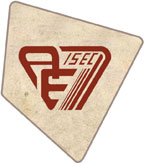
Students Association ISEC

The Student Association at ISEC was created in 1979 and have accommodated two study areas for students, two snack bars and a photocopy processing centre, several sport and recreation activities, get-togethers, important events such as academic lectures, musical events, photography and computer fairs, an engineering fair which earned reputation at the national level, a student support and career opportunities office and a support service for exchange students under the Socrates/Erasmus/Leonardo programmes.

== Programs of study ==
- Bioengineering
- Civil Engineering
- Computer Science
- Computer Science - European Course (ERASMUS)
- Electrical Engineering
- Industrial Engineering and Management
- Mechanical Engineering
- Electromechanical Engineering
- Biomedical Engineering - specialization in Bioelectronics

== See also ==
- List of colleges and universities in Portugal
- Higher education in Portugal
