= Silicon Sisters =

Canadian video game developer

- Industry: Video games
- Founded: July 2010; 16 years ago
- Founders: Brenda Bailey; Kirsten Forbes
- Headquarters: Vancouver, British Columbia, Canada
- Website: siliconsisters.ca

Silicon Sisters is a video game developer based in Vancouver, British Columbia. The studio creates games aimed at a female audience and is the first Canadian video game studio owned and run solely by women.

== History ==
Silicon Sisters focuses on romance games aimed at the underserved market of women aged 30-50 who are casual gamers. Silicon Sisters was founded by Brenda Bailey and Kirsten Forbes in July 2010. The studio released their first game, School 26, in April 2011. School 26 used the tool of empathy to advance in the game, and was downloaded more than 1,000,000 times in English, French and Japanese in 36 countries. The game gained recognition from parenting groups and game reviewers for the diversity represented in the game, as well as the positive skills gained by exploring empathy. Its sequel, School 26: Summer of Secrets, followed in the summer of 2012 and saw the exchange of secrets to advance or hinder the forward movement in the game.

In 2013, the studio released Everlove: Rose, a choose your own adventure light romance RPG geared towards adult women. The game was well received critically, but was not a commercial success.
