= Nuno Durão =

Portuguese rugby union footballer and coach

Nuno Manuel Macieira Durão (born 1962) is a Portuguese rugby union footballer and coach. He's usually considered one of the best players of his generation. He played in several positions, often as wing and fly-half.

He spent most of his playing career, starting aged 14, at Cascais, winning several National Championship and Cup of Portugal titles. He also helped Cascais to win the Iberian Cup. He was the player-coach of Cascais Rugby Linha, from the Portuguese II Division. They lost the final to Vitória Setúbal, in 2008, but won it in 2009.

Nuno Durão won 44 caps for Portugal, from 1983 to 1995, scoring 2 tries, 8 points on aggregate. He had his debut at 26 March 1983, in a 25-4 loss to Spain, in Madrid, for the FIRA Championship D2, Pool B. His last match was at 14 March 1995, in a 26-16 win over Germany, in Heidelberg, for the FIRA CHAMPIONSHIP D1, Pool B. He played in the qualifying round for the 1991 Rugby World Cup.

He was also, with João Queimado, from Benfica, one of the two first Portuguese rugby union players to be selected for a FIRA team, playing in Namibia, in 1991.
