= Agrária =

Rugby union team in Coimbra, Portugal

Agrária is the rugby union sports team of the students' union of the Escola Superior Agrária de Coimbra (Agrarian School of Coimbra), based in Coimbra, Portugal. The Agrária rugby team has been a major contender in the Portuguese top level rugby union championships. It has men, women and children rugby teams.

== Honors ==
- Campeonato Nacional de Rugby Feminino:
  - Winner (5): 2001/02, 2002/03, 2004/05, 2005/06, 2011/12
- Taça de Portugal de Rugby Feminino:
  - Winner (1): 2006/07,
