= Belas Rugby Clube =

BRC
- Full name: Belas Rugby Clube
- Ground: Campo António Pinto Bastos
- President: Luis Baptista
- Coach(es): Pedro Tomás; Narciso Figueiredo; André Duarte; Alexandre Gordo; Bruno Figueiredo; João Barros
- League: Campeonato Nacional de Rugby II Divisão
Team kit

Belas Rugby Clube is a rugby union team based in Belas, Sintra Municipality, Portugal.

Established in 1975 (as a rugby union section of Clube Desportivo de Belas), Belas RC are the only rugby union team in their area, which comprises the freguesias (civil parishes) of Queluz e Belas and Massamá e Monte Abraão in Sintra municipality, as well as the Western part of Amadora municipality. They have never played in the Portuguese top tier, despite achieving some success at the lower levels (e.g. 3rd tier national champions in 2006).
