= Supertaça de Portugal de Rugby Feminino =

Portuguese Women’s Rugby Super Cup (Union/Sevens)

The Supertaça de Portugal de Rugby Feminino (English: Portuguese Women’s Rugby Super Cup) is a Portuguese national rugby union (rugby Sevens since 2012/13), organized by the Portuguese Rugby Federation, and disputed by the winners of national championship and Portuguese cup. Start in 2004/05.

== Super Cup Rugby Champions ==
Variant	Época	Vencedor	Resultado	Finalista
Sevens	2019/20		-	
Sevens	2018/19	Sporting CP	37-0	AEES Agrária de Coimbra
Sevens	2017/18	S.L. Benfica	12-10	Sporting CP
Sevens	2016/17		-	
Sevens	2015/16	S.L. Benfica	12-7	Sporting CP
Sevens	2014/15		Not held	
Sevens	2013/14	S.L. Benfica	21-10	CR Técnico
Sevens	2012/13	S.L. Benfica	34-5	AEIS Agrária de Coimbra
Union	2011/12	S.L. Benfica	20-14	CR Técnico
Union	2010/11	S.L. Benfica	24-3	CR Técnico
Union	2009/10	S.L. Benfica	26-0	CDUP
Union	2008/09	S.L. Benfica	20-5	AEIS Agrária de Coimbra
Union	2007/08	S.L. Benfica	12-0	AEIS Agrária de Coimbra
Union	2006/07		Not held	
Union	2005/06	AEIS Agrária de Coimbra	-	S.L. Benfica
Union	2004/05	AEIS Agrária de Coimbra	-	S.L. Benfica
