= Cascais Rugby Linha =

Portuguese rugby union team

Cascais Rugby Linha is a Portuguese rugby union team. Their coach, as player-coach, is currently Nuno Durão. The team lost the final of the Second Division tournament to Vitória Setúbal, in May 2008, missing the chance of reaching the First Division.
