= Escola Superior Agrária de Coimbra =

Agricultural school in Coimbra, Portugal

Agrarian School of Coimbra
- Escola Superior Agrária de Coimbra
- Type: Public
- Established: 1887
- Affiliations: Polytechnic Institute of Coimbra
- President: João Noronha
- Vice-president: Maria José Cunha and Rui Amaro
- Academic staff: 138 (2015)
- Students: 1047 (2015)
- Location: Coimbra, Portugal; 40.213139°N 8.451417°W
- Campus: Urban/Rural
Colours
- Website: www.esac.pt

The Escola Superior Agrária de Coimbra (ESAC), in English the Agrarian School of Coimbra, is a state-run polytechnic higher education school of agriculture, based in Coimbra, Portugal. The oldest of the Coimbra Polytechnical Institute's (IPC) autonomous institutions, it has also IPC's largest campus.

== History ==
The ESAC has a long history in vocational education and provision of services to the community started in the nineteenth century as the National School of Agriculture (1899), renamed the Regents School of Agriculture (1950), and finally in the 1970s, the Higher Agrarian School of Coimbra (Escola Superior Agrária de Coimbra), a state-run higher education school of agriculture. It was incorporated into the Polytechnical Institute of Coimbra in the 1980s but preserved wide technical, pedagogical and financial autonomy. It conferred the bacharelato degree and the Diploma de Estudos Especializados (DESE) diploma. In the late 1990s, after the upgrading of the Portuguese polytechnical institutions to bachelor's degree-conferring institutions (the Portuguese licenciatura), the differences between this polytechnical school and the university institutions were drastically reduced, an achievement that would fully materialize after the Bologna Process in 2006/2007. Currently, the ESAC awards a 3-year 1st cycle bachelor's degree (licenciatura); and a 2-year 2nd cycle masters' degree in several fields including biotechnology, food engineering, organic farming, and forest engineering. In addition, ESAC has developed and expanded its own research units and programs.

== The campus ==
The ESAC is located in the urban area of the city of Coimbra, on a campus with strong rural characteristics, with a significant area of farmland, pasture, forest and infrastructure support for a total of 140 ha. It has a vast architectural heritage, architecture typical of the traditional rural location, including a listed building. The natural heritage of ESAC is also known for its quality and diversity: the region's largest camphor tree, a forest of oaks, and woody teixos, a tash, a Sequoia and species protected by the Habitats Directive. There is also a great faunal diversity including amphibians, reptiles, birds and mammals, which have been identified as species of community interest.

This set of semi-natural areas, infrastructure and equipment can be used in training activities, environmental education and recreation service to the community as the main activities of ESAC focus in teaching, research and services in the areas of agriculture, biotechnology, forestry, environment, agro-industries and eco-agritourism.

== Research and services to the community ==
The Centro de Estudos de Recursos Naturais, Ambiente e Sociedade (CERNAS) is ESAC's research and development centre. CERNAS develops scientific and technological knowledge in the areas of natural resources, food science, environment and sustainable development, based on multidisciplinary, cross sectoral and horizontal development, promoting research, dissemination of knowledge, training, scientific qualification and technology.

== Sports and student life ==
The Escola Superior Agrária de Coimbra has a notable rugby union department, usually known as Agrária. The rugby team has played in the main Portuguese leagues. The students' union is the Associação de Estudantes da Escola Superior Agrária de Coimbra (AE ESAC) which was founded in 1982 by students.

== Students' Association ==
The Student Association at ESAC was created in 1982 when a group of students of the school decided to form the Association of Students of the Higher School of Agrarian of Coimbra (AE ESAC). Since then, AE ESAC has never stopped. There have been a number of conferences, conferences, meetings, fairs and exhibitions that have taken place, in addition to the nuclei that he has formed, and which demonstrate the openness that the Association has always had in welcoming new ideas and new projects. The Association of Students is elected annually among one or more candidate lists, which must obey two rules: to be students of this school and to be members of AE ESAC. At present, the ESAC Student Association is made up of 25 students from all courses. Throughout the year it is the duty of AE ESAC to receive all students and, above all, to defend their rights, both at the level of the Board of Directors, the Pedagogical Council and the Assembly of Representatives, and the teachers, without, however, making them forget their duties.

== Notable personalities ==
- Luís de Matos, (born 23 August 1970), a Portuguese magician. Alumnus and former teacher at ESAC.

== See also ==
- Agrária
- Higher education in Portugal
