= Entertainment Software Association of Canada =

Non-profit trade association

- Formation: October 2004; 20 years ago
- Type: Non-profit trade association
- President and CEO: Jayson Hilchie
- Website: www.theesa.ca

Entertainment Software Association of Canada (ESAC) is a Canadian trade association representing companies in Canada that develop, publish and distribute video games. ESAC's services include, business and consumer research, government relations, and media relations.

The organization was founded in October 2004 by a group of industry leaders and companies in the Canadian video game industry, from the previous Canadian Interactive Digital Software Association as a wholly Canadian entity.

== Organization ==
The organization's founding Executive Director was Danielle LaBossiere Parr who led the organization from inception until 2012. From 2012 until 2024 the organization was led by Jayson Hilchie who served as its President & CEO. In November, 2024 ESAC announced that former Vice President of Policy and Government Affairs, Paul Fogolin, would assume the role of its next President & CEO.
