= Flávio =

Flávio is a Portuguese language given name, equivalent to the Latinate Flavius, and Italian and Spanish Flavio. The Portuguese diminutive form is Flavinho.

Notable people with the name include:

- Antônio Flávio (born 1987), Brazilian footballer
- Flávio Aguiar (born 1947), Brazilian writer
- Flávio Alarico (c. 715 – c. 760), Visigothic knight, 3rd Count of Coimbra
- Flávio Amado (born 1979), Angolan footballer
- Flávio Viegas Amoreira (born 1965), Brazilian writer, poet, and literary critic
- Flávio Araújo (born 1963), Brazilian football manager
- Flávio Arns (born 1950), Brazilian politician
- Flávio Barros (footballer, born 1966), Brazilian footballer
- Flávio Barros (footballer, born 1978), Brazilian footballer
- Flávio Boaventura (born 1987), Brazilian footballer
- Flávio Bolsonaro (born 1981), Brazilian politician
- Flávio Cabral (1918–1990), American painter
- Flávio Caça-Rato (born 1986), Brazilian footballer
- Flávio Campos (born 1965), Brazilian footballer and manager
- Flávio Canto (born 1975), Brazilian judoka
- Flávio Cardoso (born 1980), Brazilian bicycle racer
- Flávio Carneiro (born 1962), Brazilian writer
- Flávio de Carvalho (1899–1973), Brazilian architect and artist
- Flávio de Carvalho Jr. (1916–1990), Brazilian chess player
- Flávio Cavalcanti (1923–1986), Brazilian TV presenter and journalist
- Flávio Cerqueira (born 1985), Portuguese footballer
- Flávio Chamis, Brazilian musician
- Flávio Cipriano (born 1990), Brazilian cyclist
- Flávio Ataúlfo de Coimbra (c. 710 – c. 740), Visigothic knight, 2nd Count of Coimbra
- Flávio Sisebuto de Coimbra (c. 690 – c. 735), Judge of Coimbra, count of the Christians of Coimbra
- Flávio Conceição (born 1974), Brazilian footballer
- Flávio Costa (1906–1999), Brazilian footballer and manager
- Flávio Cruz (born 1982), Portuguese volleyball player
- Flávio Cuca (born 1970), Brazilian footballer
- Flávio Deslandes, Brazilian industrial designer
- Flávio Dias (born 1978), Brazilian footballer
- Flávio Dino (born 1968), Brazilian attorney, politician and teacher
- Flávio Donizete (born 1984), Brazilian footballer
- Flávio Ferreira (born 1991), Portuguese footballer
- Flávio Ferri (born 1973), Brazilian footballer
- Flávio (footballer, born 1970) (1970–2025), Brazilian footballer (Flávio Emídio dos Santos Vieira)
- Flávio (footballer, born April 1975), Brazilian footballer (Flávio Elias Cordeiro)
- Flávio (footballer, born September 1975), Brazilian footballer (Flávio Luis da Silva)
- Flávio (footballer, born 1980), Brazilian footballer (Flávio Pinto de Souza)
- Flávio (footballer, born 1985), Brazilian football goalkeeper (Flávio Henrique Esteves Guedes)
- Flávio (footballer, born 2000), Brazilian footballer (Luiz Flávio Silverio Silva)
- Flávio Furtado (born 1978), Cape Verdean boxer
- Flávio Galvão (born 1949), Brazilian actor
- Flávio Garcia (born 1987), Brazilian football coach
- Flávio Godoy (born 1969), Brazilian runner
- Flávio Gonçalves (born 2007), Portuguese footballer
- Flávio Gualberto (born 1993), Brazilian volleyball player
- Flávio Guimarães (1963), Brazilian blues musician
- Flávio Hermenegildo (c. 768 – c. 831), 6th Count of Coimbra
- Flávio Igor (born 1984), Portuguese footballer
- Flávio José (born 1951), Brazilian composer and singer
- Flávio Beck Júnior (born 1987), Brazilian professional footballer
- Flávio Kapczinski (born 1963), Brazilian researcher
- Flávio Kenup (born 1979), Brazilian adventurer
- Flávio Kretzer (born 1979), Brazilian footballer
- Flávio Lopes (born 1965), Brazilian footballer
- Flávio Marcílio (1917–1992), Brazilian politician
- Flávio Medeiros (born 1996), Brazilian footballer
- Flávio Meireles (born 1976), Portuguese footballer and football director
- Flávio de Melo (1965–1992), Brazilian rower
- Flávio Migliaccio (1934–2020), Brazilian actor
- Flávio Minuano (born 1944), Brazilian footballer
- Flávio Murtosa (born 1951), Brazilian footballer and manager
- Flávio Nazinho (born 2003), Portuguese footballer
- Flávio Paixão (born 1984), Portuguese footballer
- Flávio Paulino (born 1989), Brazilian footballer
- Flávio Pereira, Brazilian Paralympic footballer
- Flávio Prado (born 1954), Brazilian sports journalist
- Flávio Ramos (footballer, born 1889), Brazilian footballer
- Flávio Ramos (footballer, born 1994), Brazilian footballer
- Flávio Rocha (born 1958), Brazilian politician
- Flávio Rodrigues (born 1979), Brazilian flamenco guitarist and composer
- Flávio Saretta (born 1980), Brazilian tennis player
- Flávio Silva (born 1996), Bissau-Guinean footballer
- Flávio Augusto da Silva (born 1972), Brazilian businessman
- Flávio Aurélio dos Santos Soares (born 1972), Brazilian basketball player, better known as Espiga
- Flávio Teodosio (c. 740 – 805), 4th Count of Coimbra
- Flávio Venturini (born 1949), Brazilian singer and songwriter

Flavinho

- Flavinho (footballer, born 1981), Brazilian footballer (Flávio Silveiro José de Carvalho)
- Flavinho (footballer, born 1983), Brazilian footballer (Flávio Alex Valêncio)
