= Deslandes =

Deslandes is a French surname. Notable people with the surname include:

- André-François Deslandes (1689–1757), French philosopher
- Arnaud Deslandes (born 1982), French politician
- Carolina Deslandes (born 1991), Portuguese singer-songwriter
- Charlie Deslandes (1900–1967), Australian rules footballer
- Flávio Deslandes, Brazilian industrial designer
- Ghislain Deslandes (born 1970), French philosopher
- Madeleine Deslandes (1866–1929), French writer
- Paulin Deslandes (1806–1866), French playwright
- Raymond Deslandes (1825–1890), French journalist, playwright and theatre manager
- Sanita Pavļuta-Deslandes (born 1972), Latvian civil servant and diplomat
- Sylvain Deslandes (born 1997), French footballer
