= Counts of Coimbra, first creation =

Nobleman specifically called count of Coimbra

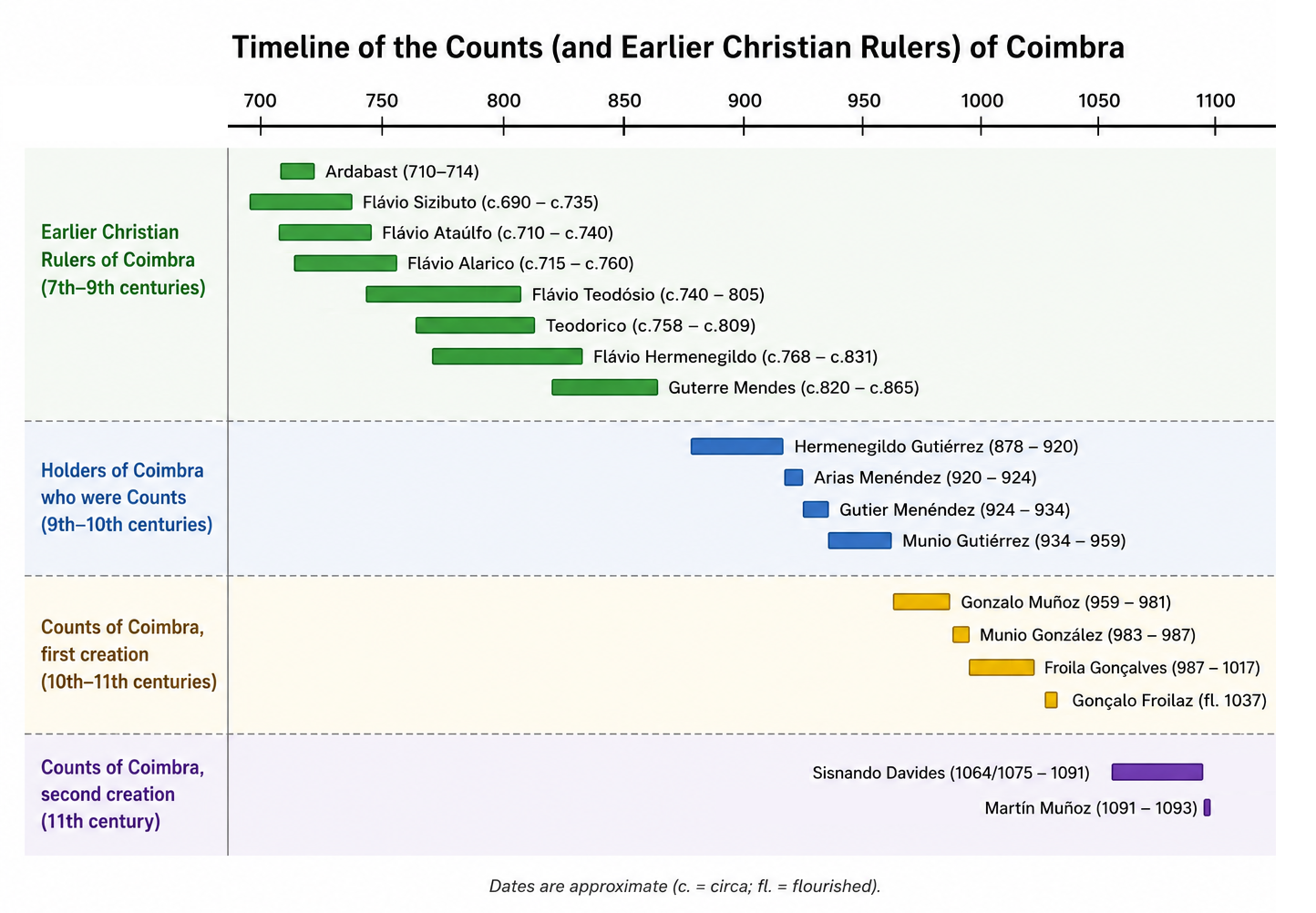
Timeline of the Counts of Coimbra

The County of Coimbra was a political entity consisting of the lands of Coimbra, Viseu, Lamego and Santa Maria da Feira, in modern Portugal. After 959 the Kingdom of León creates the County and specifically appoints Counts to this territory. The political environment was one of increasing aristocratic autonomy throughout western Iberia. Coimbra's rulers were frontier lords responsible for defense against al-Andalus while simultaneously pursuing their own dynastic interests. This continues up to 987 when the region is recaptured by the Moors of Abu Amir Al-Mansur, after which the line of Counts of Coimbra continues under Muslim domain. It ends when the city of Coimbra was permanently secured by the Christians in 1064, with the second creation of the County and Sisnando Davides being named as Count.

== Gonzalo Muñoz ==
Gonzalo Muñoz (Gonçalo Moniz, Gundisalvus Munionis, Gundisalb ibn Munio) (959 - 981) was the first nobleman to be specifically called count of Coimbra. Grandson of Hermenegildo Gutiérrez and son of Munio Gutiérrez and Elvira Arias, he married Tutadomna Froilaz and had four children, the first being Froila Gonçalves.

Becoming count around 959, and was one of the most powerful noblemen in the western part of the Kingdom of Leon until he rose in rebellion against Bermudo II and was probably killed during the region's subjugation. José Mattoso identified him as belonging to the aristocratic group that controlled the Mondego frontier during the weakening of royal authority in León. The surviving documentation suggests that by the 960s he exercised effective control over the Coimbra region and its dependent territories. The last document mentioning Gonzalo is a donation to Lorvão monastery in December 981.

== Munio González ==
Munio González (Múnio Gonçalves) (983 - 987), succeeded of Gonzalo Muñoz, and most references to him come through genealogical reconstruction and witness lists in charters.

The Muslim offensive led by Abu Amir Al-Mansur captures Coimbra in 987, but Munio's exact fate is unknown. His last document dates from 988.

== Froila Gonçalves ==
Froila Gonçalves (Fruela Gonçalves, Fruela González) (987 - 1017), was a brother of Munio González, and ruled under Muslim domain.

Historian Pedro Alexandre Gonçalves argues that Froila controlled a reduced political entity in the Coimbra area for roughly three decades. According to this interpretation, he accepted the suzerainty of Córdoba while preserving local authority. He participated in military operations, joining Al-Mansur's sack of Santiago de Compostela in 997. He also maintained close relations with religious institutions, especially the monastery of Vacariça.

== Gonçalo Froilaz ==
Gonçalo Froilaz (Gundisalvus Froilæ) (fl. 1037), was a son of Froila Gonçalves, having married Ermesenda Fernandes. He appeared sporadically in eleventh-century documentation, but remained sufficiently influential to preserve his lands, social status, and ecclesiastical connections.
