= Rivière Blanche (Artibonite) =

Coordinates: 19°06′0″N 72°18′0″W

Location
- Country: Haiti

Physical characteristics
- Length: 15 km (9.3 mi)

Rivière Blanche (French pronunciation: [ʁivjɛʁ blɑ̃ʃ], lit. 'White River') is a river in Haiti in Artibonite of the Dessalines Arrondissement.

== Geography ==
This river is a tributary of the Artibonite River. It runs along the city of Deslandes when she joined her confluence with the Artibonite River.
