= Flávio Ramos =

Flávio Ramos may refer to:

- Flávio Ramos (footballer, born 1889), Flávio da Silva Ramos, founder, president and player of Botafogo FC
- Flávio Ramos (footballer, born 1994), Flávio da Silva Ramos, Brazilian football central defender

== See also ==
- Flávio
- Ramos
