= Martín Muñoz =

Count of Coimbra

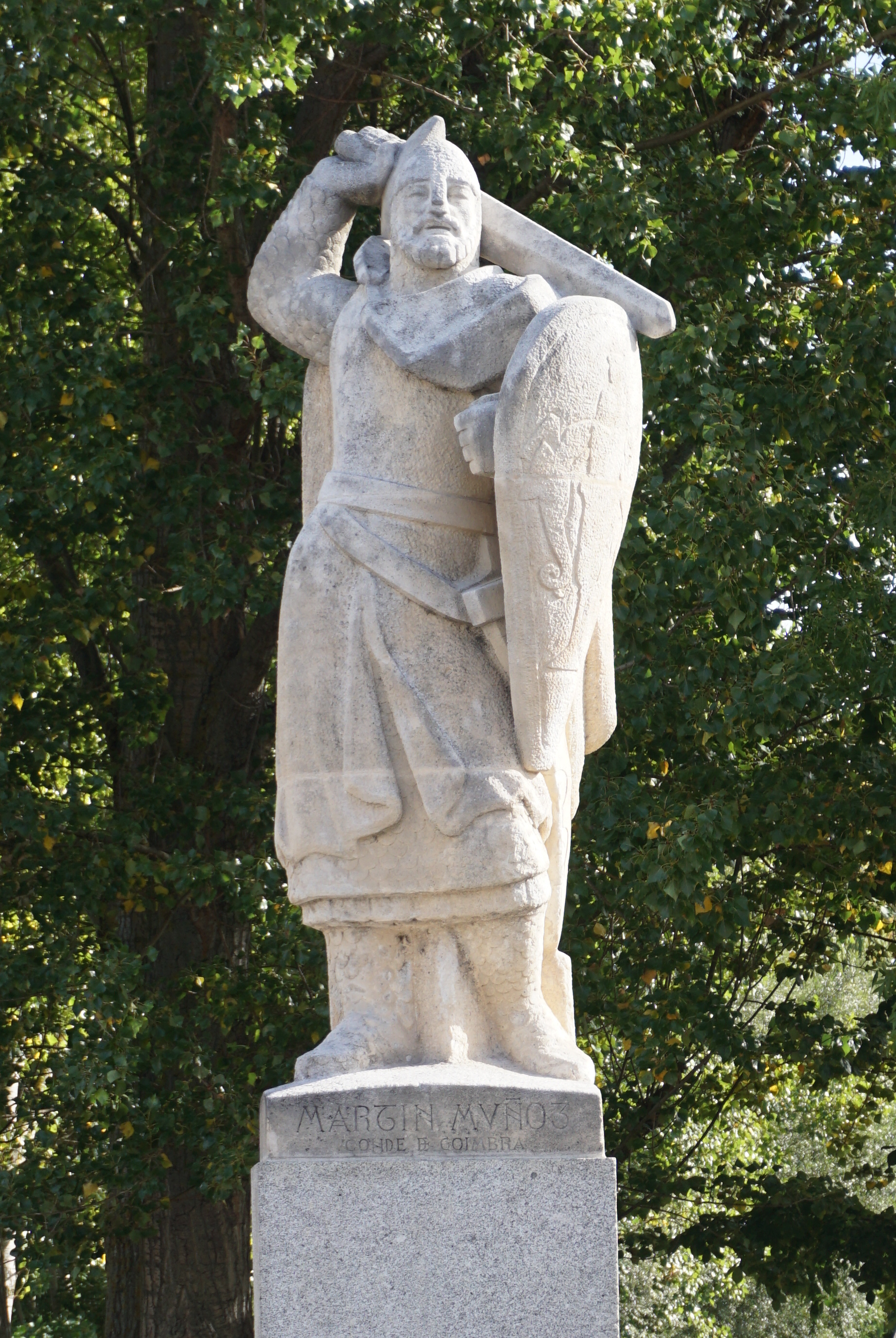
Statue of Martín Muñoz, last Count of Coimbra (before integration in County of Portucale). In Puente de San Pablo, Burgos

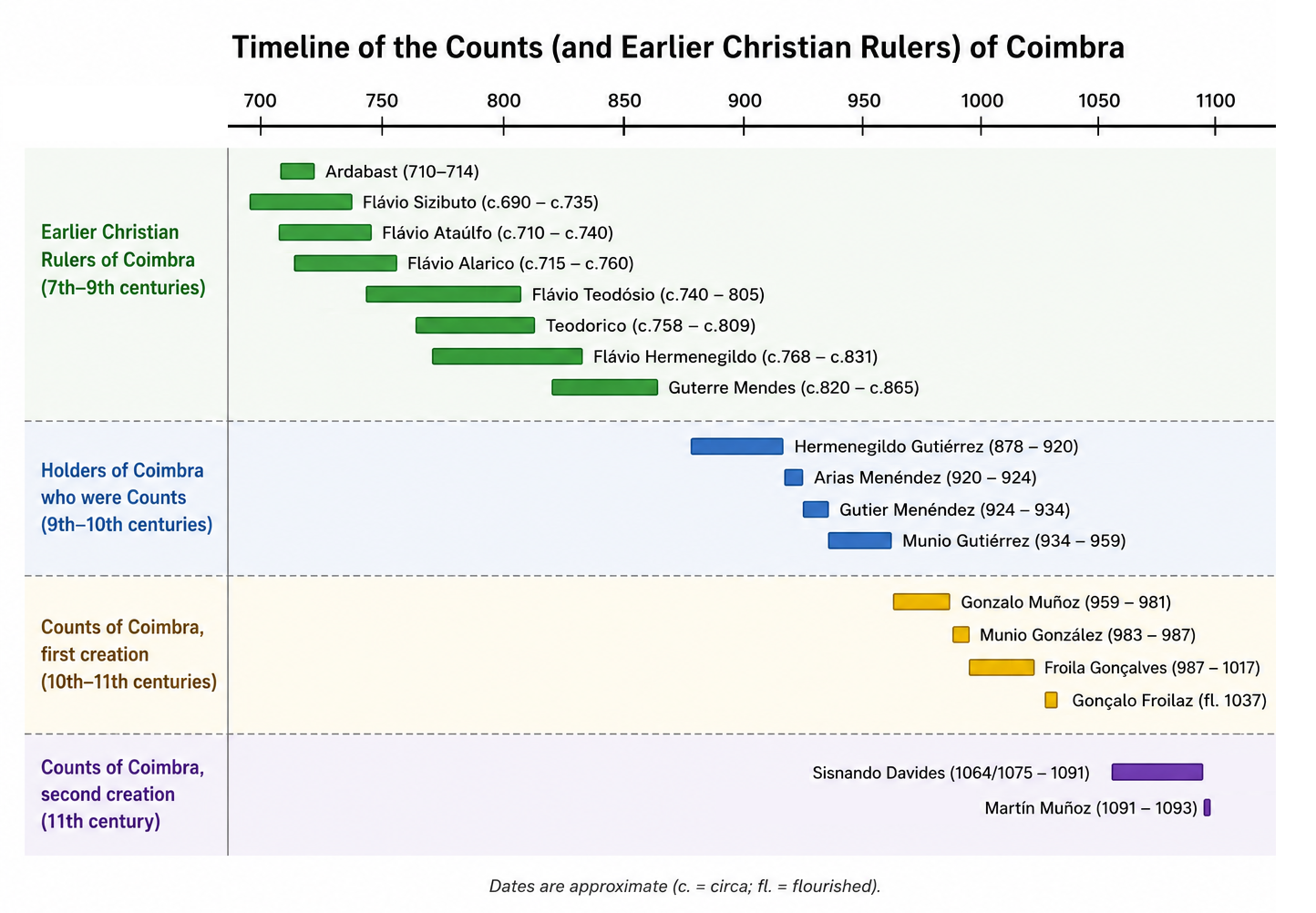
Timeline of the Counts of Coimbra

Martín Muñoz de Montemayor (Portuguese: Martim Moniz de Ribadouro; before 1080 - after 1111), also known as Martín Muñoz de Ribadouro, was a medieval noble from the County of Portugal who, through marriage, became the son-in-law of the famous alvazil Sisnando Davides. Sisnando appointed him as alvazil, and after his death, Martín became the new Count of Coimbra. He was later deposed and nominated Governor of Arouca, eventually moving to the courts of El Cid and Peter I of Aragon.

== Early years ==
Martín was the son of Monio Fromariques, most likely the son of Fromarico Moniz, who in turn was the brother of the then lord of Ribadouro and head of the family, Egas Moniz I de Ribadouro. His mother, Elvira Gondesendes, is of uncertain origin.

Through marriage, Martín connected himself to two significant political entities. He married Elvira Sisnandes de Coimbra, the only daughter of the renowned Sisnando Davides, the Mozarabic governor of Coimbra, and Loba Nunes de Portucale, the only daughter of Count Nuno Mendes, who died in 1071. The marriage likely occurred around 1080, as from that year, Martín began to be designated, like his father-in-law, as alvazil, along with Mido and Zacarias Davides, and Mendo Baldemires, possibly relatives of the governor, considering at least the similar patronymic of the first two.

Thus, the death of alvazil Sesnando Davides, Martín's father-in-law, on December 25, 1091, did not mark the immediate end of Mozarabic administration in Coimbra, which had been in place since 1064, the year of the city's reconquest by Ferdinand the Great (likely motivated by Sesnando himself). As a Mozarab, Sesnando had always maintained a balance between the two forces of the reconquest: despite being a vassal of a Christian king, his Mozarabic origin allowed him to more easily maintain peace south of the Mondego River, the last frontier of Christian domain in that region.

== The government of Coimbra ==
Martín was chosen by his father-in-law, Sesnando Davides, as his successor in governing the county of Coimbra. Thus, it is likely that the succession between father-in-law and son-in-law was relatively peaceful in the city. Unlike his father-in-law, Martín effectively used the title of comes (count), with which he signed some documents, stating: "I, M. Moniz, governor of Coimbra and son-in-law of consul Sisnando, who took his place, confirm and promise to truly uphold whatever my lord the emperor ordered."

However, the actions of Alfonso VI of León and Castile were not peaceful. Likely wishing to reduce Mozarabic influence over Coimbra, he did not delay: even before the death of the alvazil, at Easter 1091, he appointed a new bishop for the city: Bishop Crescónio, who had been Abbot of Tui, and was recognized by all as the monarch's choice for the spiritual governance of Coimbra. However, the consecration and installation of the new bishop could only take place after the alvazil's death, during Martín Muñoz's government.

== Conquests of Lisbon, Santarém, and Sintra ==
Around that time, Alfonso VI was also negotiating with Omar al-Mutawakkil the handover of the cities then under Arab control - Lisbon, Santarém, and Sintra - and planned to strengthen the administrative and military posts of these newly acquired frontier cities.

On April 22, 1093, Alfonso confirmed, in Coimbra, the charter he had granted years earlier, in 1085. The urgency of the frontier matter was such that the monarch celebrated that year's Easter while traveling, probably in Tui. Martín was among those who confirmed this new charter, along with Bishop Crescónio and Count Raymond of Burgundy. Accompanying Alfonso, Martín headed south, and between April 30 and May 5 of that same year, saw the fall of the three frontier cities promised to the King of León, who entrusted them to his son-in-law and likely trusted man, Count Raymond.

== Deposition of Martín Muñoz and consequences ==
In this grand "gift" to his son-in-law, Alfonso also took the opportunity to remove Martín from the governance of Coimbra in 1093, transferring it to the same son-in-law.

This act challenged Mozarabic power in Coimbra, especially due to the growing Frankish predominance, an elite with whom the Mozarabs continued to dispute control of the city, despite being at a clear disadvantage. The lack of a Mozarabic leader of the caliber of the late Sesnando, who could balance the political scales, likely hindered the Mozarabic tolerance that had existed in Coimbra until then.

== Later years: between Aragon and Valencia ==
Probably as compensation, Martín received the tenancy of Arouca, which he held in 1094, and possibly of Lamego, a lesser position he likely abdicated to take refuge in Valencia, at the court of the famous El Cid, where he resided until El Cid's death in 1099. He then traveled to the court of Peter I of Aragon, where he remained until 1111, during the reign of Peter's brother, Alfonso I of Aragon. Martín seems to have supported Alfonso I against the then Queen Urraca I of León and Castile.

Martín Muñoz likely died shortly after 1111, as he did not confirm any documents after that date.

== See also ==
- Portugal in the Reconquista
