= Little Blues =

Little blues

Studio album by Flávio Guimarães
- Released: 1995
- Recorded: January–September 1994
- Genre: Blues, jazz
- Length: 63:11
- Label: Eldorado
- Producer: Flávio Guimarães

Flávio Guimarães chronology
| Little blues (1995) | On the loose (2000) |

Little blues is the first solo album recorded by the Brazilian singer and harmonica player Flávio Guimarães. The album counts with the participation of many famous blues artists from Brazil and abroad, such as Paulo Moura, Ed Motta, Roberto Frejat and Sugar Blue. The songs in the disc also presents some influences of the jazz.

== Track listing ==
| # | Title | Songwriters | Length |
|---|---|---|---|
| 1. | "Telephone blues" | George "Harmonica" Smith | 3:00 |
| 2. | "Take five" | Paul Desmond | 6:58 |
| 3. | "Blues jam for Charlie" | Flávio Guimarães | 5:49 |
| 4. | "Honest I do" | Jimmy Reed | 3:16 |
| 5. | "Blue stu" | Robben Ford | 8:01 |
| 6. | "Free delay" | Flávio Guimarães | 0:59 |
| 7. | "Hoochie coochie man" | Willie Dixon | 5:07 |
| 8. | "Sick and tired" | C. Kenner, D. Bartholomew | 4:21 |
| 9. | "Surfing" | Flávio Guimarães, Kadu Menezes, Otávio Rocha, Ugo Perrotta | 3:06 |
| 10. | "Baby, please don't go" | Big Joe Williams | 3:44 |
| 11. | "Hand jive" | J. Otis | 3:47 |
| 12. | "Na Baixa do Sapateiro" | Ary Barroso | 6:53 |
| 13. | "Tin sandwich swing" | Mike Turk | 4:26 |
| 14. | "Russo's blues" | Paulo Russo | 2:18 |
| 15. | "Blues pra Márcia" | Flávio Guimarães | 1:18 |

== Personnel ==
- Flávio Guimarães: vocals (except in "Honest I do"), harmonicas and snaps (in "Blues pra Márcia")
- Otávio Rocha: guitars and acoustic guitars (except in "Baby, please don't go") and snaps (in "Blues pra Márcia")
- Marco Tomasso: piano (except in "Baby, please don't go")
- Paulo Russo: bass (in "Take five", "Blues jam for Charlie", "Blue stu", "Na Baixa do Sapateiro", "Tin sandwich swing" and "Russo's blues")
- Ugo Perrotta: bass (in "Hoochie coochie man", "Sick and tired", "Surfing" and "Hand jive") and snaps (in "Blues pra Márcia")
- Pedro Strasser: drums (in "Take five", "Blues jam for Charlie", "Blue stu", "Na Baixa do Sapateiro", "Tin sandwich swing" and "Russo's blues")
- Kadu Menezes: drums (in "Free delay", "Hoochie coochie man", "Sick and tired", "Surfing", "Hand jive" and "Blues pra Márcia") and snaps (in "Blues pra Márcia")

Special guests:

- Sugar Blue: harmonica (in "Telephone blues" and "Sick and tired")
- Ed Motta: vocals (in "Honest I do")
- Mauro Senise: saxophone (in "Blue stu")
- Roberto Frejat: guitars (in "Baby, please don't go")
- George Israel: saxophone (in "Baby, please don't go")
- Rodrigo: bass (in "Baby, please don't go")
- Mauricio Gaetani: piano (in "Baby, please don't go")
- Rildo Hora: harmonica (in "Na Baixa do Sapateiro")
