= County of Coimbra =

Former country

County of Coimbra, consisting of the lands of Coimbra, Viseu, Lamego and Santa Maria da Feira on a map of in modern Portugal

The County of Coimbra (Old Galician: Comtato de Coimbra) was a political entity consisting of the lands of Coimbra, Viseu, Lamego and Santa Maria da Feira, in modern Portugal.

== History ==
=== Counts of the Christians of Coimbra ===
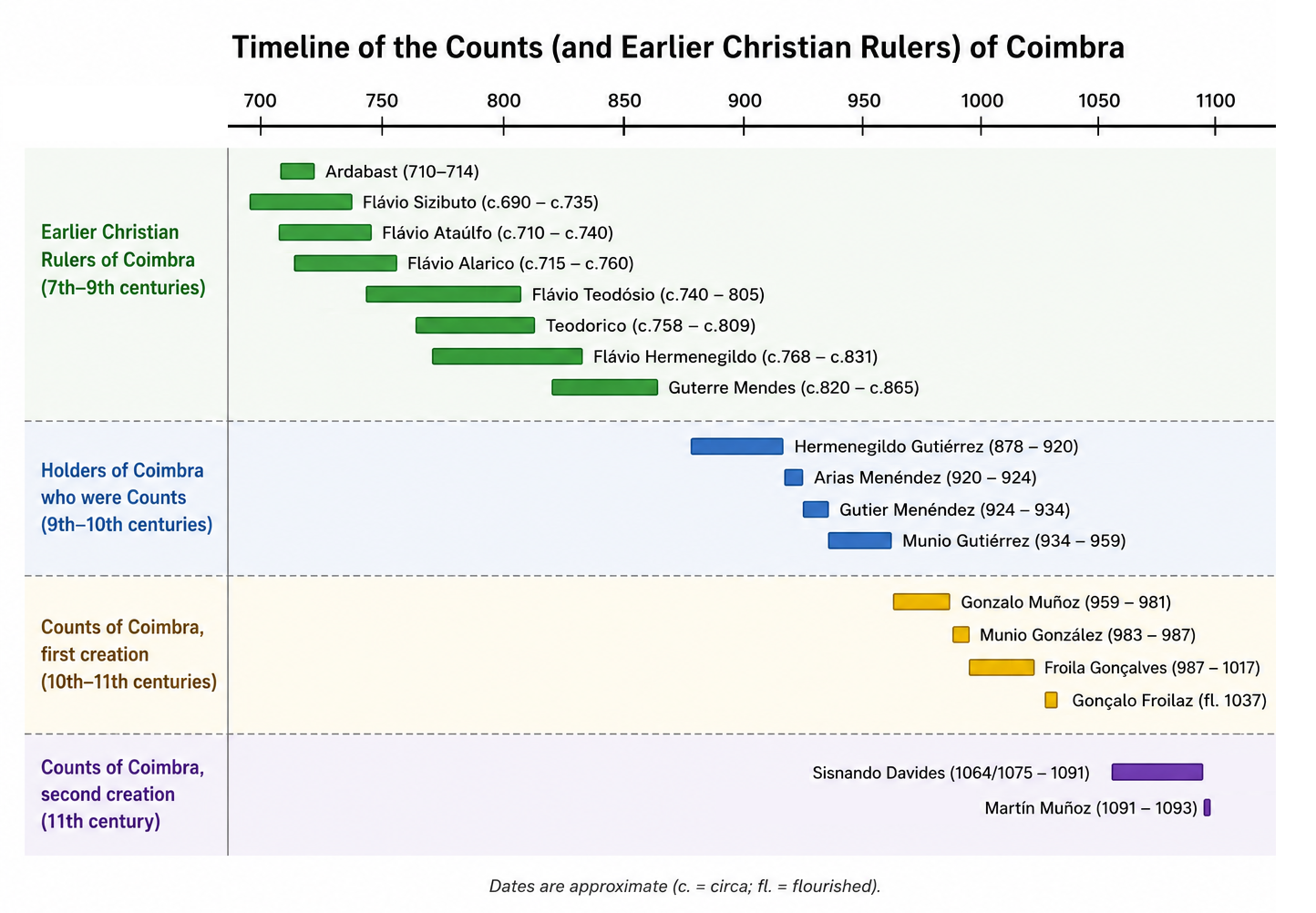
Timeline of the Counts of Coimbra

During the Visigothic Kingdom (from the 5th to the early 8th centuries, the County of Coimbra, with its seat in Coimbra (Emínio), was created by King Wittiza (c. 687 – probably 710) as a sub-county of his dominion and was established as a fief for his son Ardabast (Artabasdus), who became Count of the Christians of Coimbra.

The first Muslim campaigns that occupied the Iberian Peninsula occurred between 711 and 715, with Coimbra capitulating to Musa bin Nusair in 714. Under the Umayyad state of Córdoba the city of Coimbra (Qulumriyah) maintained a significant Christian population (known as Mozarabs), who were allowed to maintain their faith in exchange for paying the jizya (a tax levied on non-Muslims). The continued use of "Count" (comes, a Roman court title) by the leaders of this community up to as late as 805 reflects the continuation of older Roman and Gothic administrative traditions in the city.

List of Counts of the Christians of Coimbra

- Ardabast (710–714), count of the Christians of Coimbra
- Flávio Sizibuto (c.690 - c.735), Judge of Coimbra, count of the Christians of Coimbra
- Flávio Ataúlfo (c.710 - c.740), Count of Coimbra and ruler or the Christians on Coimbra territory
- Flávio Alarico (c.715 - c.760), count of the Christians of Coimbra
- Flávio Teodósio (c.740 - 805), count of the Christians of Coimbra
- Teodorico (c.758 - c. 809), Count of Coimbra
- Flávio Hermenegildo (c.768 - c.831), brother of Teodorico, abandoned Coimbra in 815
- Guterre Mendes (c.820 - c.865), son of Hermenegildo, lived in the court of Asturias

=== Within the Kingdom of Asturias ===
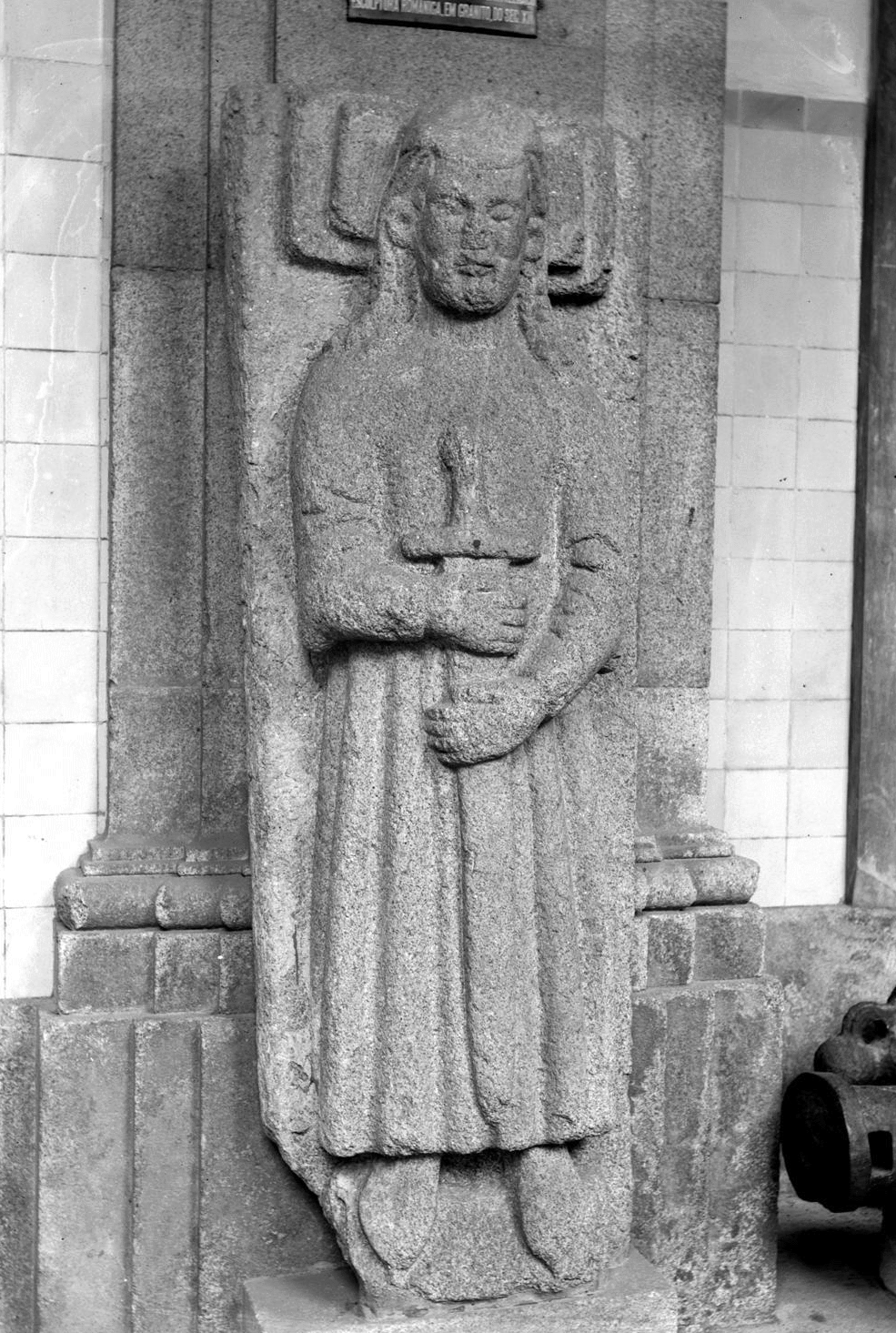
Hermenegildo Gutiérrez (878 – 920), Conqueror of Coimbra (Dux Bellorum of Coimbra).

The County appears within the Kingdom of Asturias after the reconquest of the region, when the lands were granted to Hermenegildo Gutiérrez (878 – 920), who over the next four decades was largely responsible for the resettlement of the depopulated province. He and his immediate successors were counts, and held Coimbra, but were not explicitly counts of Coimbra, although they are sometimes referred to as such retrospectively.

List of holders of Coimbra who were counts

- Hermenegildo Gutiérrez (878 – 920); (Conqueror of Coimbra) Dux Bellorum of Coimbra
- Arias Menéndez (920 – 924), son of Hermenegildo
- Gutier Menéndez (924 – 934), son of Hermenegildo
- Munio Gutiérrez (934 – 959), son of Gutierre, son-in-law of Arias

=== Counts of Coimbra, first creation ===
The first nobleman specifically to be called count of Coimbra was Gonzalo Muñoz (959 – 981) who was probably a scion of the family of Hermenegildo. Becoming count around 959, he was one of the most powerful noblemen in the western part of the kingdom until he rose in rebellion against King Bermudo II of León and was probably killed during the region's subjugation. The degree to which his successors were alienated from their monarch can be seen by the fact that after the region's recapture in 987 by the Moors of Abu Amir Al-Mansur, Gonzalo's sons joined that general in his sack of Santiago de Compostela in 997.

List of Counts of Coimbra, first creation

- Gonzalo Muñoz (959 – 981), son of Munio
- Munio González (983 – 987), son of Gonzalo
- Froila Gonçalves (987 – 1017), under Muslim domain, brother of Munio González
- Gonçalo Froilaz (fl. 1037), son of Froila

=== Counts of Coimbra, second creation ===
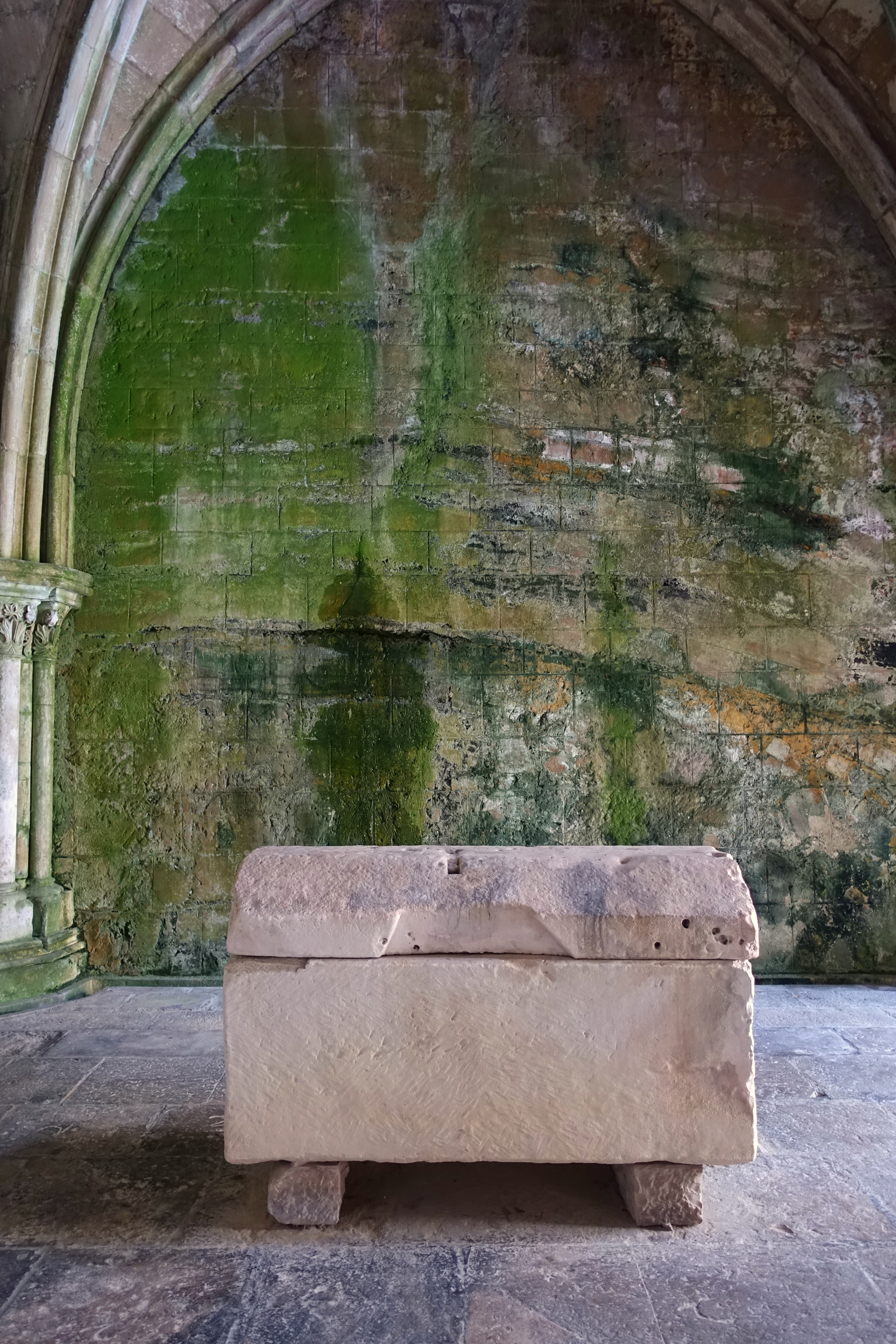
Tomb of Sisnando Davides, named Count of Coimbra in 1064.

The city of Coimbra was permanently secured by the Christians in 1064 after it had been taken by the troops of King Ferdinand I of León, led by the Mozarab Sisnando Davides, who would be named its count.

List of Counts of Coimbra, second creation

- Sisnando Davides (1064/1075 – 1091)
- Martín Muñoz (1091 – 1093), son-in-law of Sisnando

=== Incorporation into Portugal ===
The County of Coimbra ceased to be an independent political entity in 1096 when it was incorporated in the territory of the Second County of Portugal during the latter's restoration under Henry of Burgundy. Subsequently it formed part of the newly-founded Kingdom of Portugal under Henry's son, Afonso I.

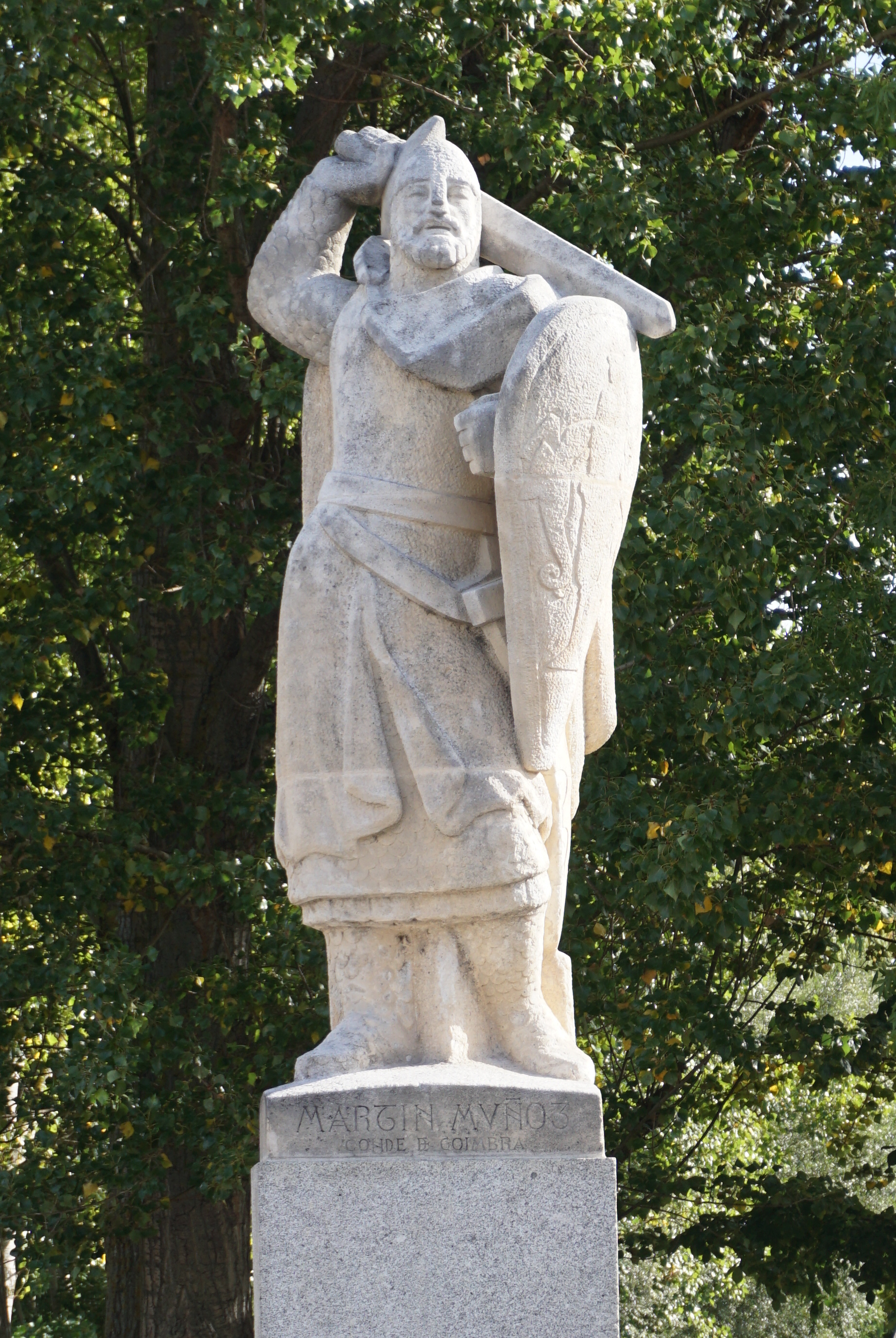
Martin Muñoz (1091 – 1093), last Count of Coimbra.

== See also ==
- Portugal in the Reconquista
