= Teodorico de Coimbra =

5th Count of Coimbra (c. 758 - c. 809)

- Count of Coimbra
- Tenure: 791 - 809
- Predecessor: Flávio Teodosio
- Successor: Flávio Hermenegildo
- Other names: Theodorico
- Born: c. 758
- Died: c. 809
- Father: Flávio Teodosio
- Mother: Munia Sueira

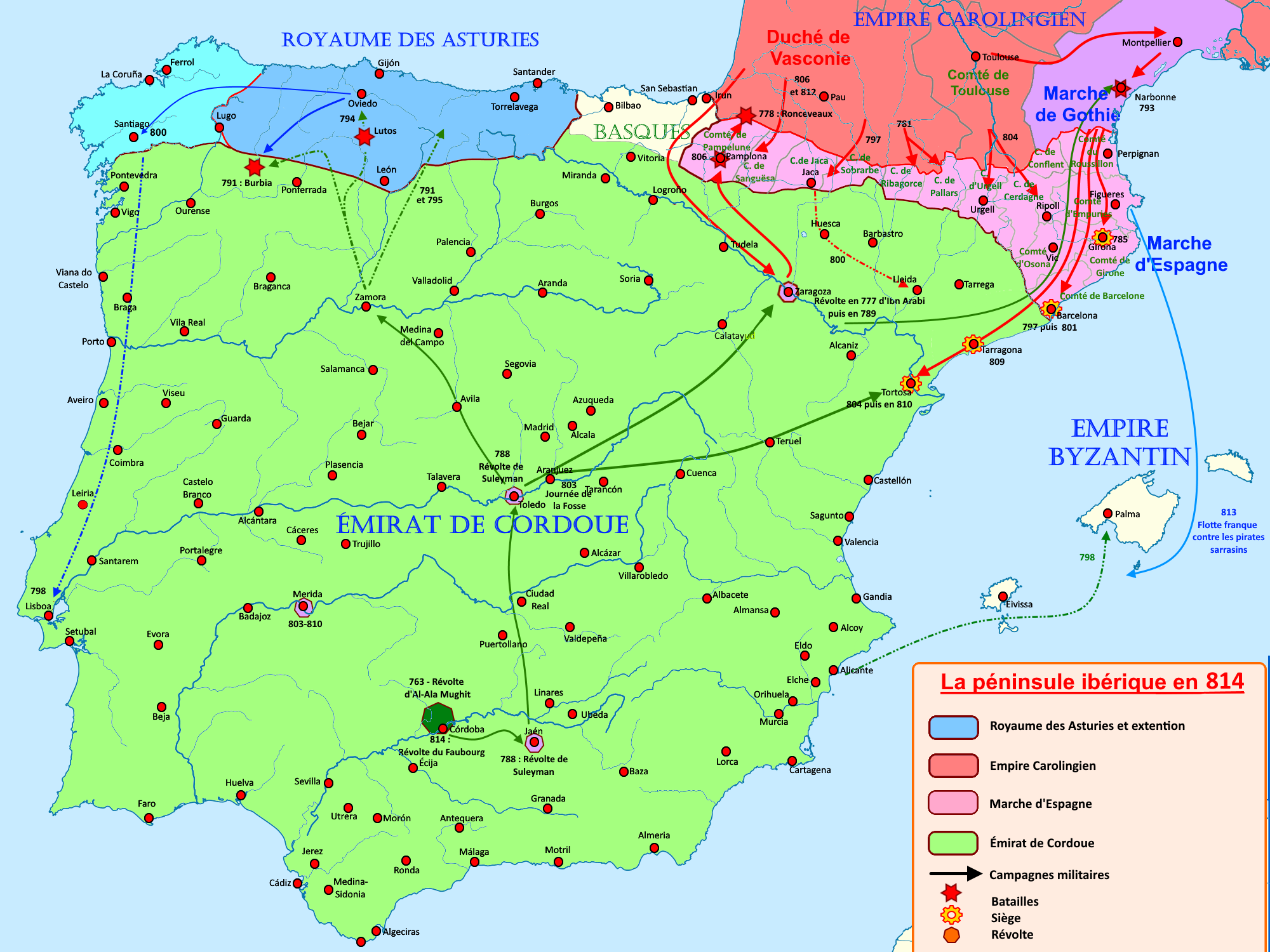
Iberian Peninsula in 814

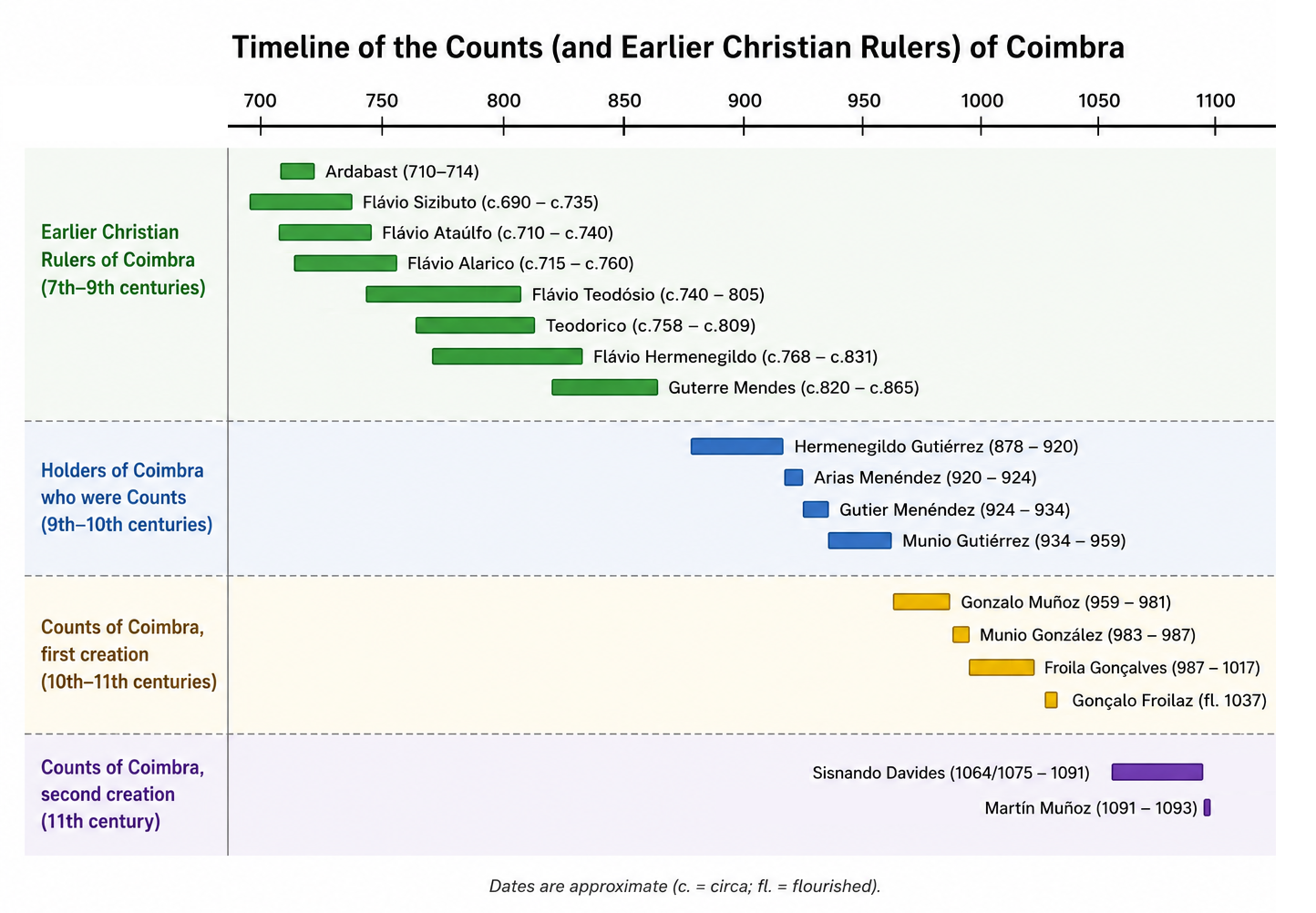
Timeline of the Counts of Coimbra

Teodorico de Coimbra (c. 758 - c. 809), also known as Theodorico, was the 5th Count of Coimbra in the early 9th century.

== Biography ==
Born around 758, Teodorico was the son of Flávio Teodósio, and was mentioned as count after 791.

His tenure as Count was marked by significant challenges, particularly the Mozarabic revolts that erupted following King Alfonso II of Asturias's attack on Lisbon in 798. These uprisings persisted in the western regions until 809, when Islamic forces, led by Prince Hishâm ibn al-Hakam, seized Coimbra and reasserted control over the western Hispanic territories. Theodoric's association with the rebellious Mozarabic community likely led to his demise during this period.

Theodoric's rule over Coimbra was brief and tumultuous, reflecting the broader conflicts and power struggles of the Iberian Peninsula during that era. His life and leadership were deeply intertwined with the religious and political upheavals of the time, ultimately culminating in his death amid the Mozarabic revolts and the subsequent Islamic reconquest of Coimbra.

He did not leave any descendants, and with his death, this branch of the lineage came to an end. His brother, Ataulfo, pursued an ecclesiastical career, while another brother, Flávio Hermenegildo, continued the family line.
