= Flávio Kenup =

Brazilian adventurer (born 1979)

Flávio Kenup, a.k.a. Viola Kenup (born 19 July 1979) is a Brazilian adventurer and world record holder for the longest trip on a scooter. He was born in Teresópolis, Rio de Janeiro, Brazil.

== Adventure Ushuaia on Two Wheels ==
Flavio Kenup's first adventure was a 45-day trip from Teresopolis, Brazil to Ushuaia, Argentina, the southernmost city in Latin America. Kenup is also a black belt in Brazilian Jiu-Jitsu under Robson Moura.

== Adventure Alaska on Two Wheels ==
One Man, No Support, 110cc's, 55,000 kilometers, 7.5 months: On May 1, 2007, Flavio Kenup left Teresopolis, Brazil on a Traxx Sky 110 scooter. As of October 18, 2007 Flavio has traversed more than 13 countries and 39,000 kilometers. Guinness Book of World Records Brazil Edition has opened a category for the longest continuous trip on a scooter, a record which Flavio has already secured.
