= Flávio Ataúlfo de Coimbra =

Visigothic knight, 2nd Count of Coimbra (c. 710 – c. 740)

- Count of Coimbra, ruler or the Christians on Coimbra territory
- Predecessor: Flávio Sisebuto de Coimbra
- Successor: Flávio Alarico
- Born: c.710
- Died: c.740
- Spouse: Ildoara Sueira
- Father: Flávio Sisebuto de Coimbra

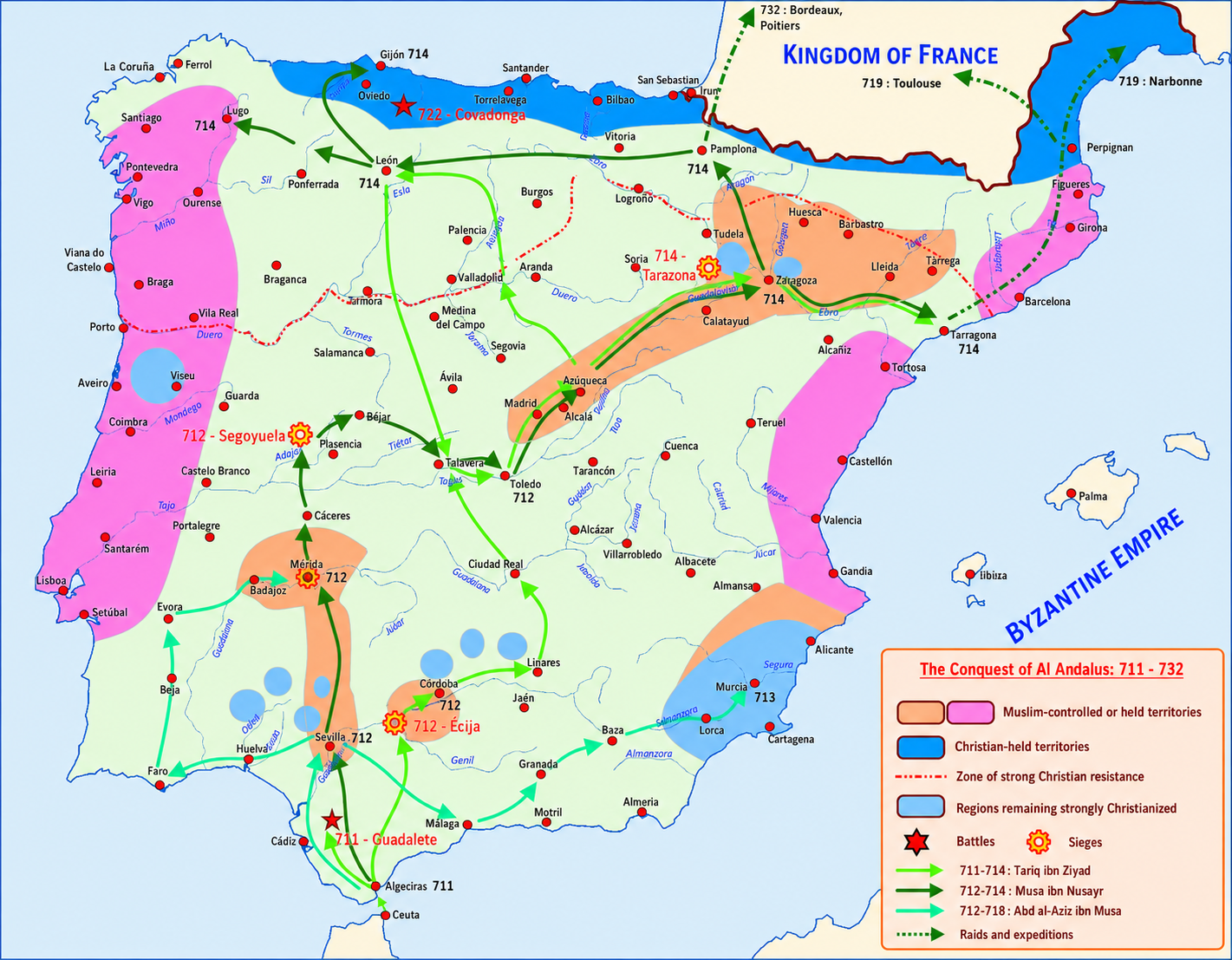
Muslim conquest of the Iberian Peninsula 711-719

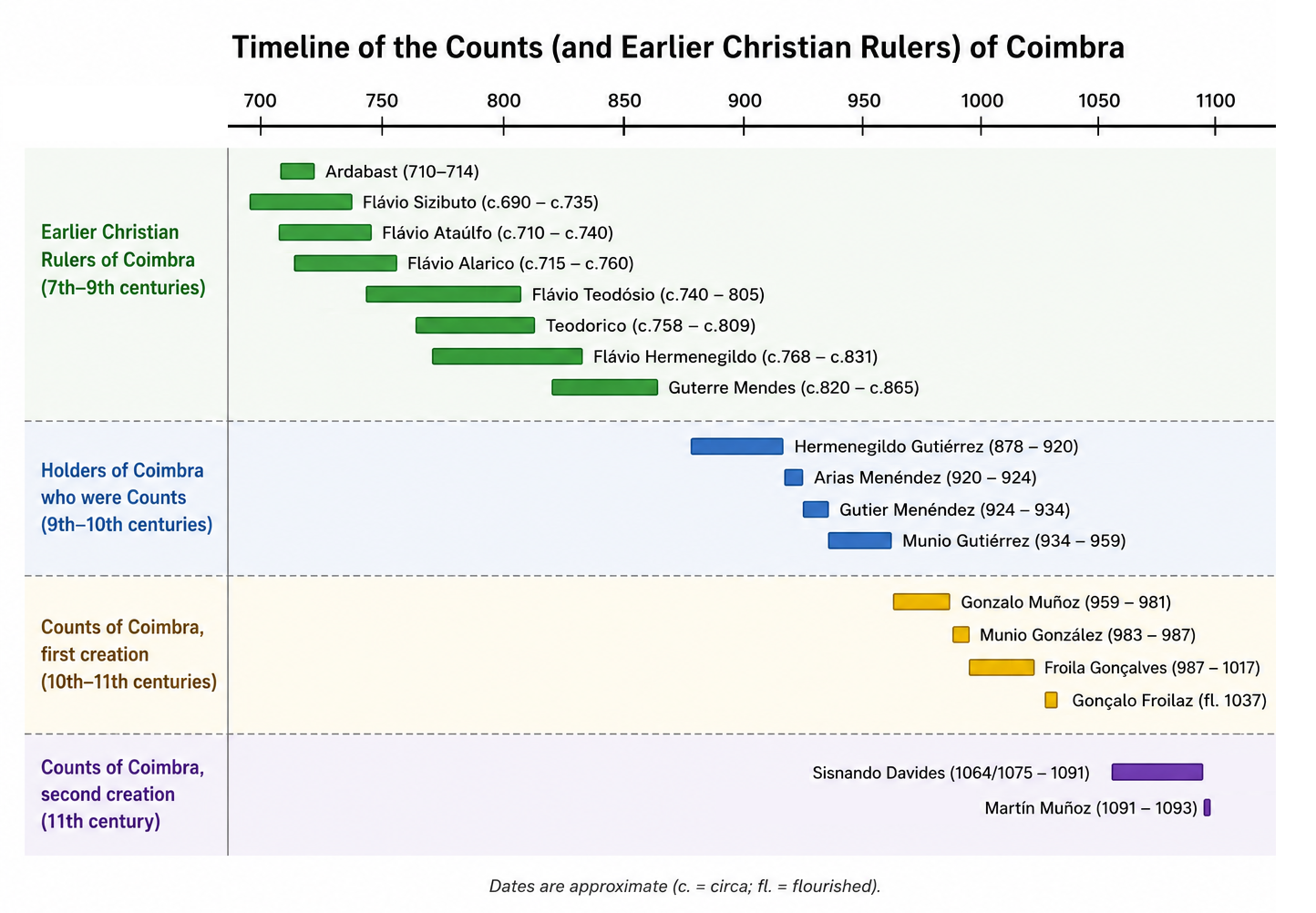
Timeline of the Counts of Coimbra

Flávio Ataúlfo de Coimbra (c.710 - c.740) was a Knight of Visigothic origin, 2nd Count of Coimbra and ruler or the Christians on Coimbra territory.

The first Muslim campaigns that occupied the Iberian Peninsula occurred between 711 and 715, with Coimbra capitulating to Musa bin Nusair in 714.

Coimbra, like many other cities in early Al-Andalus, had a significant Christian population (known as Mozarabs), who were allowed to maintain their faith in exchange for paying the jizya (a tax levied on non-Muslims). The use of "count" (comes) in his title, a remnant of Visigothic nobility, reflects the continuation of older Roman and Gothic administrative traditions in the city.

== Biography ==
Flávio was the son of Flávio Sisebuto de Coimbra (Judge of Coimbra). He married an Ildoara Sueira and had no descendants, with the title going to his brother Flávio Alarico.
