= Flávio Viegas Amoreira =

Brazilian writer, poet, and literary critic (born 1965)

- Born: 1965 (age 60–61); Santos, São Paulo, Brazil
- Occupations: Chronicler and poet
- Writing career
- Literary movement: Post-Modernism

Flávio Viegas Amoreira (born 1965) is a writer, poet, short story writer, and literary critic. He is one of the most prominent voices in the new Brazilian literature that emerged at the turn of the century with the so-called "Generation 00." His work is characterized by strong formal experimentation and content innovation, alternating between different genres within a fragmented syntax.

== Biography ==
Flávio Viegas Amoreira, born in Santos in 1965, is a writer, poet, short story writer, novelist, playwright, and journalist. Throughout his career, he has collaborated aesthetically with important composers such as Gilberto Mendes and Livio Tragtenberg, with whom he developed projects integrating literature and music. In 2022, on the occasion of Gilberto Mendes' centenary, he published a biography in tribute to the musician and conductor from Santos. Active as a cultural promoter, he develops projects in São Paulo, Rio de Janeiro, and along the São Paulo coast, promoting discussions on avant-garde arts, poetry readings, and literary creation workshops.

His literary production includes 14 books, among them Maralto, A Biblioteca Submergida, Contogramas, Escorbuto, Cantos da Costa, Edoardo, o Ele de Nós, Oceano Cais, Desaforismos, and Pessoa doutra margem. Amoreira has also participated in several poetry and short story anthologies, including Geração Zero Zero, which brings together innovative writers published in the first decade of the 21st century, organized by critic Nelson de Oliveira.

In theater, in addition to working as a playwright, he gave a controversial interview to director Antônio Abujamra on the program Provocações on TV Cultura, where he discussed topics relevant to Brazilian literature and culture. His involvement in universities, literary magazines, social networks, and digital art creation stands out, reaffirming him as one of the most dynamic figures in New Brazilian Literature.

Flávio Viegas Amoreira is associated with the cultural movement in Santos that emerged in the late 1970s and early 1980s, a period marked by challenges in the artistic and political scene following the end of the military regime. His work is characterized by a deep connection with the geography of Santos, a city that inspires his poetry and social criticism, often infused with maritime metaphors and a keen eye on cultural transformations. Throughout his career, Amoreira has also worked as a teacher in literary workshops. In 2024, he was elected to the Academia Santista de Letras (ASL), occupying seat 25, whose patron is the poet Vicente de Carvalho, further solidifying his influence on the literary scene.

== Literary Criticism ==
The American literary critic and professor at the University of Florida, Charles Perrone, in his book Brazil, Lyric, and the Americas, analyzes Escorbuto: Cantos da Costa, a work by Flávio Viegas Amoreira. Perrone highlights the author's postmodern and experimental nature, describing him as "a delirious postmodern writer who appropriates any and all sources, whose diffuse consciousness generates dense streams of words and images of striking cultural phenomena, some of which rise to the surface for further exposition or proposition."

Literary critic and USP professor Aurora Bernardini analyzed the book Apesar de Você, eu Conto by Flávio Viegas Amoreira, highlighting its innovation in terms of "internet writing." According to Bernardini, the work, composed of 52 short stories of “free words,” presents recurring characteristics in Amoreira's writing, such as the suppression of punctuation, the transgression of spelling rules, the use of verbs in the infinitive, and extensive analogies.

USP professor Mario Tommaso Pugliese Filho analyzed the book Edoardo, o Ele de Nós (Editora 7Letras) by Flávio Viegas Amoreira, highlighting its narrative and thematic complexity. According to Pugliese, the work explores homosexual relationships from a perspective that contrasts “being”, understood as a metaphysical and essential union of the loving encounter, with “hooking up”, a contingent concept associated with erotic disengagement. The author employs physicality as a means of satirizing the metaphysical idea, incorporating double-entendre wordplay.

== Published works ==
- Maralto (7Letras, 2002);
- The Submerged Library (7Letras, 2003);
- Contograms (7Letras, 2004);
- Scurvy, corners of the coast, (7Letras, 2005)
- Edoardo, the Him of Us (2007),
- The contours of the mountains are the ocean's farewell to the pier (Dulcineia Catadora, 2007)
- Sampoema (Acaia Studio, 2008)
- Clarice Lispector: script of the unfathomable
- Disaphorisms & Subway Plots (Kazuá, 2015)
- The Void Reflected in the Light of Nothingness (Kazuá, 2015)
- Whitman My Brother (Collective Imagination, 2019)
- Person from the other side (Collective Imagination, 2019)
- Gilberto Mendes: Biographical Notes (2021)
- Despite You, I Count (Kotter, 2022)
- Whitman and Pessoa, my comrades (Kotter, 2023)
- Des Cocoon (Cat's Ribs, 2024)
- Vicente de Carvalho rediscovered (Cat's Ribs, 2024)
