= Madeleine Deslandes =

French writer (1866–1929)

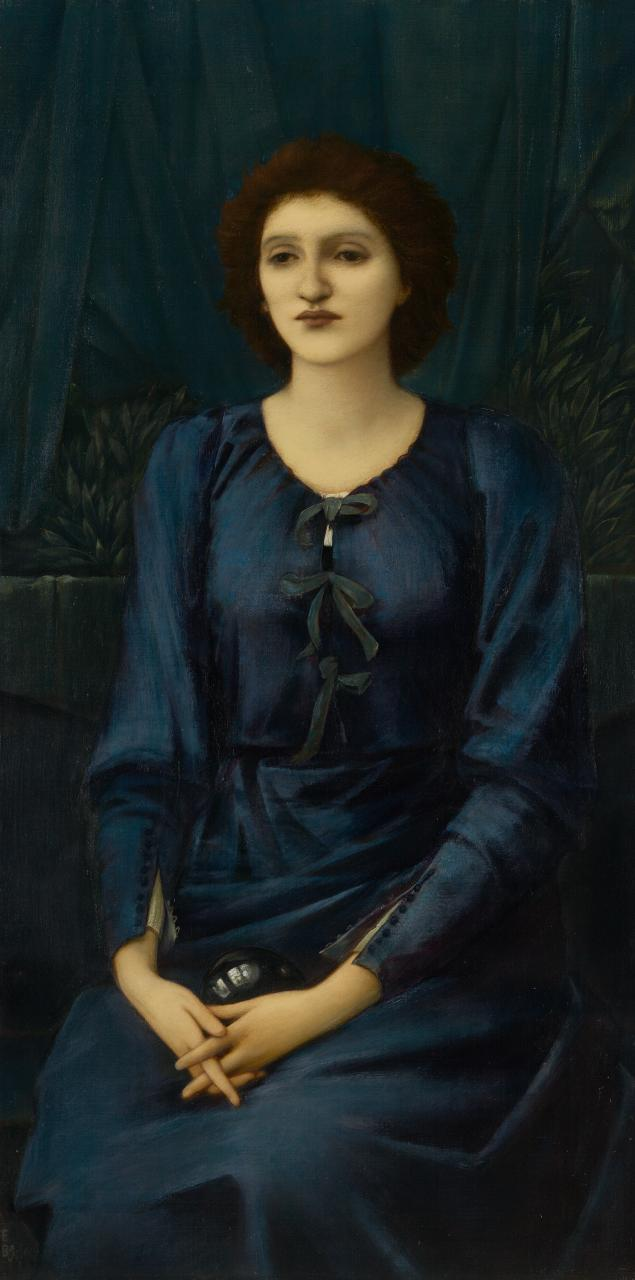
- Portrait of Madeleine Deslandes by Edward Burne-Jones
- Born: 16 April 1866; Montluçon, France
- Died: 2 March 1929 (aged 62); Paris, France
- Writing career
- Pen name: Ossit
- Notable works: A quoi bon? (1892); Ilse (1894); Cyrène (1908).

Baronne Madeleine Annette Edmé Angélique Vivier-Deslandes (16 April 1866 – 2 March 1929) was a French writer associated with the English Pre-Raphaelites. She was the subject of a painting by Edward Burne-Jones.

Deslandes travelled to England in 1893 to meet Burne-Jones in preparation for an article that she was writing about him for Le Figaro. It was arranged that Burne-Jones would paint Deslandes' portrait, which he did in 1895–96.

Deslandes wrote under the pseudonym "Ossit". She wrote four novels : A quoi bon? (1892), Ilse (1894), Il n'y a plus d'îles bienheureuses (1898) and Cyrène (1908).

According to Emily Wubben, Deslandes "pursued a glittering social life in Parisian literary and artistic circles. She was celebrated as a hostess of a cultured salon that attracted the presence of renowned artists, poets and composers." She once entered a lion's cage at a fair and recited poetry by Jean Richepin.
