= Flávio Kapczinski =

Brazilian researcher (born 1963)

- Born: 1963 (age 61–62)
- Education: Federal University of Rio Grande do Sul; University of London
- Known for: Research on bipolar disorder
- Scientific career
- Institutions: Federal University of Rio Grande do Sul

Flávio Pereira Kapczinski (born in 1963) is a Brazilian researcher on bipolar disorder. He is a member of the Brazilian Academy of Sciences. He obtained his PhD in psychiatry at the University of London in 1995.

He is a professor at the Federal University of Rio Grande do Sul. His research also focus on the use of artificial intelligence for the treatment of psychiatric disorders.

He also works at the Hospital de Clínicas de Porto Alegre.

He is also a clinical psychiatrist.

He is a highly cited researcher.

He co-authored two books on bipolar disorder: Transtorno Bipolar: Teoria e Clínica (2009; 1st edition), and Transtorno Bipolar: Diagnóstico e Tratamento (2023).
