= Flávio Sisebuto de Coimbra =

Judge of Coimbra, count of the Christians of Coimbra (c. 690 – c. 735)

- Count of the Christians of Coimbra; Judge of Coimbra
- Tenure: 714
- Successor: Flávio Ataúlfo de Coimbra
- Born: c.690
- Died: c.735
- Spouse: Andulfa (or Sindoinda)
- Issue: Flávio Ataúlfo, Flávio Alarico
- Father: Egica
- Mother: Cixilo Balthes

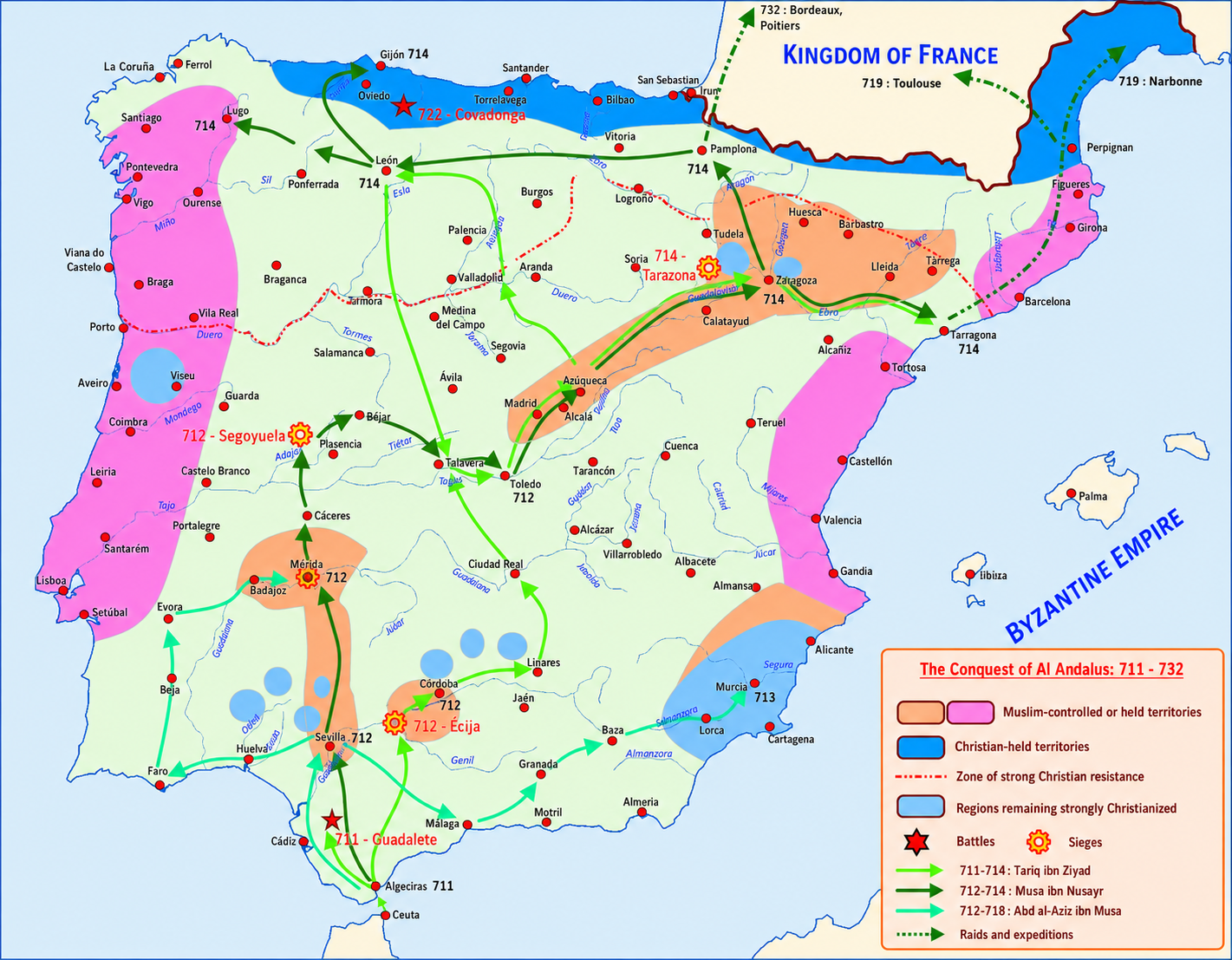
Muslim conquest of the Iberian Peninsula 711-719

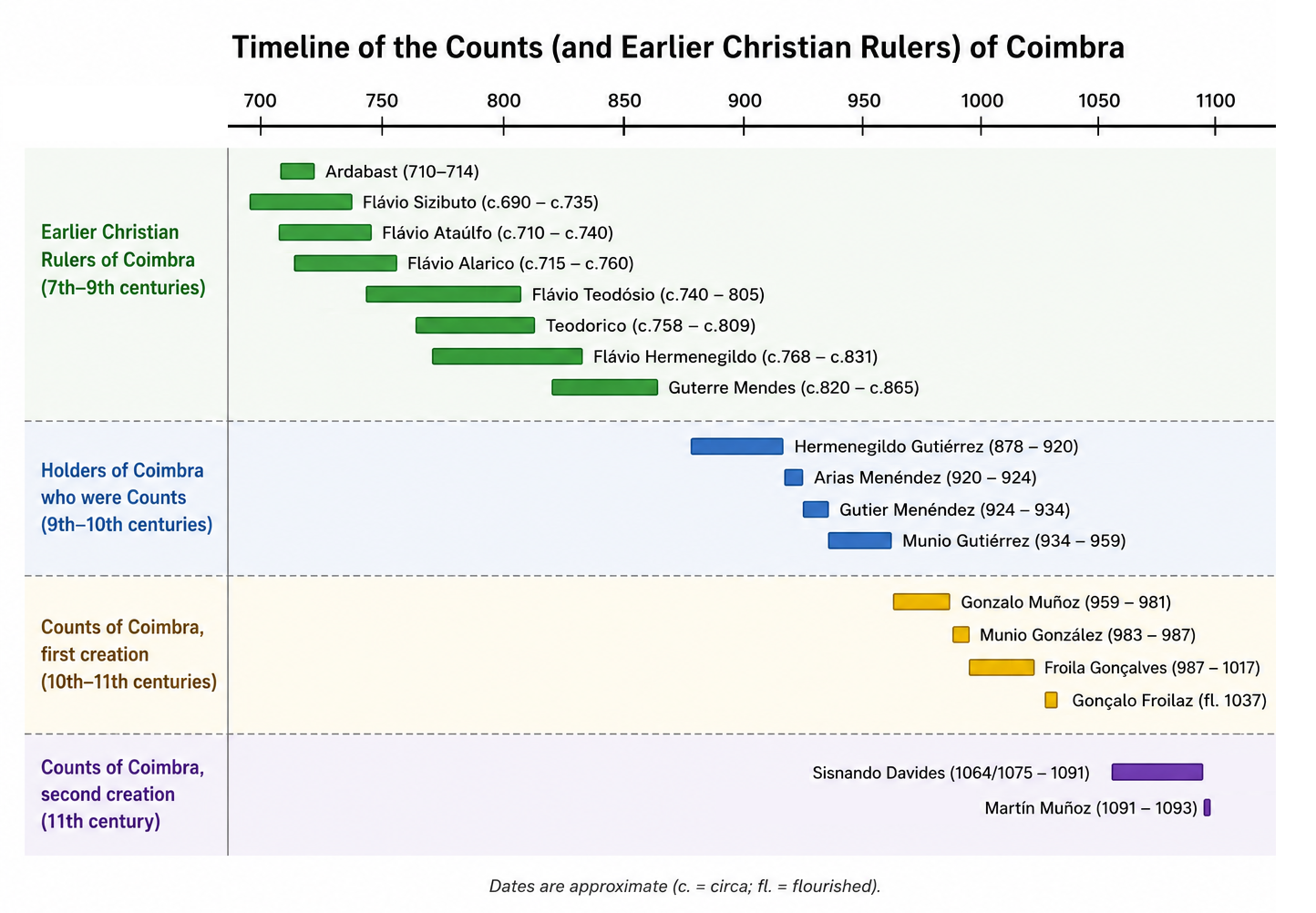
Timeline of the Counts of Coimbra

Flávio Sisebuto or Flávio Sizibuto (c. 690 - c. 735) was a prominent figure in early 8th-century Iberian history, serving as a Judge of Coimbra and Count of the Christians of Coimbra during a crucial period of transformation as the Umayyad Caliphate consolidated control over the Al-Andalus. His life and role reflect the local governance structures that persisted under Muslim rule and the ways in which Christian communities organized themselves within a predominantly Islamic domain.

== Judge and Count of the Christians ==
Flavio Sizibuto’s position as Judge of Coimbra (sometimes referred to as Iudex or Comes) was likely an important local title that designated him as the primary authority over the Christian population in the region. Coimbra, like many other cities in early Al-Andalus, had a significant Christian population (known as Mozarabs), who were allowed to maintain their faith in exchange for paying the jizya (a tax levied on non-Muslims).

The title judge in this context was not merely judicial, but often carried administrative, military, and political responsibilities. The use of "count" (comes) in his title, a remnant of Visigothic nobility, reflects the continuation of older Roman and Gothic administrative traditions in the city.

The Nobiliário of Lourenço Mendes (1280) leaves the following information about Flávio Sizibuto: “Seeing the loss of Spain and his brother dead, he withdrew to the parts of Coimbra in the year 708, where he had farms throughout the province of Beira through his father and grandfather, nephew of King Wamba by commission of the Moorish King. In 714 he was given the title of Count of Coimbra and Governor of the Christians of that territory by consent of the Moors who dominated it.”

== Family ==
He was the son of Egica (687-702) and Cixilo Balthes (granddaughter of Sisebut). Married with Andulfa (or Sindoinda), from whom he had:

- Flávio Ataúlfo de Coimbra
- Flávio Alarico
