= Flavius (name) =

Flavius is a Romanian masculine given name. Notable persons with that name include:

- Flavius Băd (born 1983), Romanian football player
- Flavius Boroncoi (born 1976), Romanian football player and manager
- Flavius Daniliuc (born 2001), Austrian football player
- Flavius Domide (1946–2025), Romanian football player
- Flavius Iacob (born 2000), Romanian football player
- Flavius Koczi (born 1987), Romanian artistic gymnast
- Flavius Moldovan (born 1976), Romanian football player
- Flavius Pogăcean (born 1974), Romanian football player
- Flavius Stoican (born 1976), Romanian football manager

== See also ==
- Lucius Caesetius Flavus (first century BC), Roman politician, appears as Flavius in Julius Caesar
- Operation Flavius, a 1988 British military operation in Gibraltar
- Flavius L. Brooke (1858–1921), American judge
