= Charlie Deslandes =

Australian rules footballer, born 1900

Personal information
- Full name: Charles Robert Deslandes
- Born: 28 April 1900; Fitzroy, Victoria
- Died: 4 April 1967 (aged 66); Port Melbourne, Victoria
- Height: 168 cm (5 ft 6 in)
- Weight: 67 kg (148 lb)

Playing career^{1}
Years	Club	Games (Goals)
1924	Fitzroy	8 (4)
- ^{1} Playing statistics correct to the end of 1924.

Charlie Deslandes (28 April 1900 – 4 April 1967) was an Australian rules footballer who played with Fitzroy in the Victorian Football League (VFL).
