= Sisnando Davides =

Mozarab noble

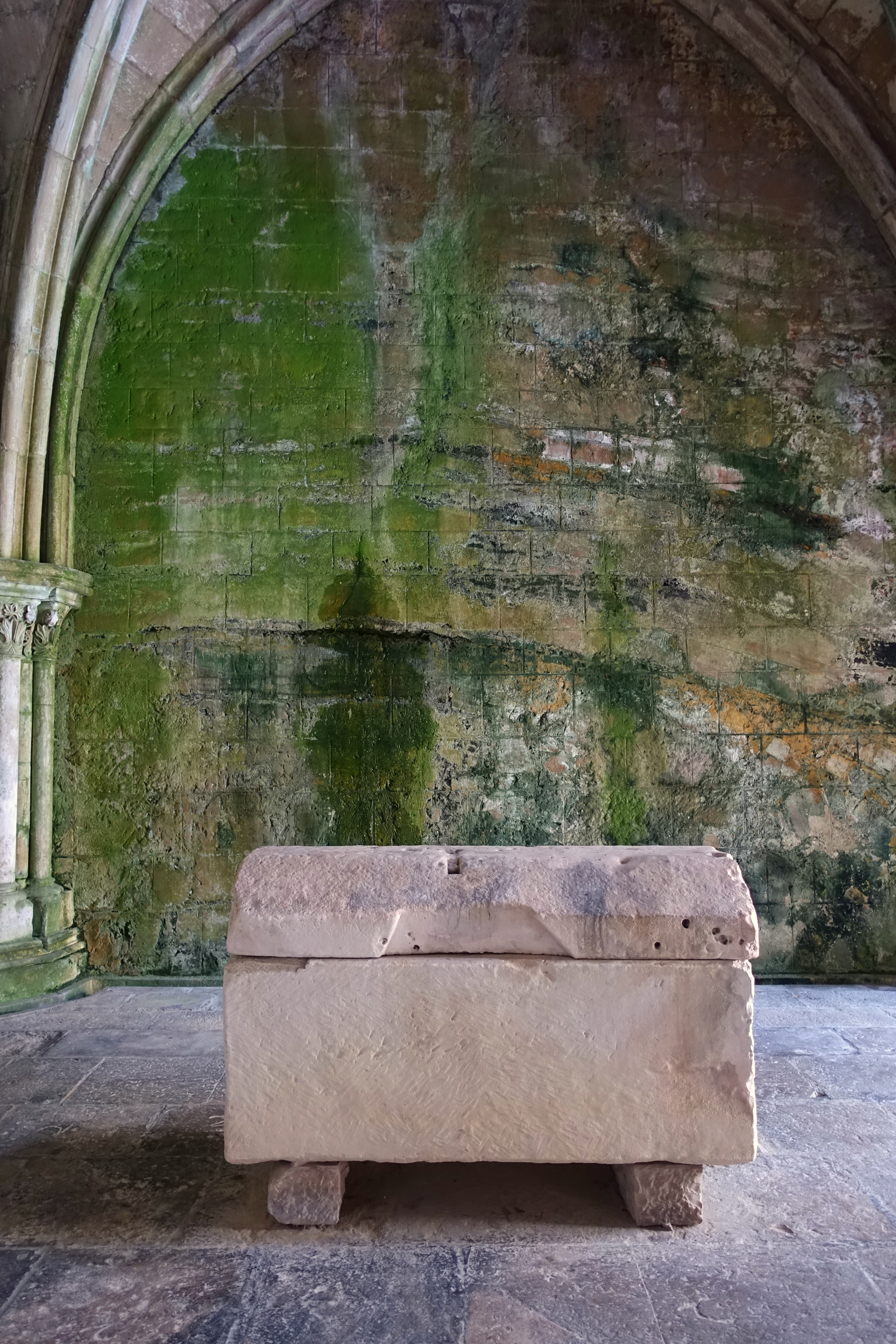
Sisnando's tomb

"Sisnando" in Arabic, from the contemporary chronicle of Ibn Bassam. It is pronounced "Shishnand".

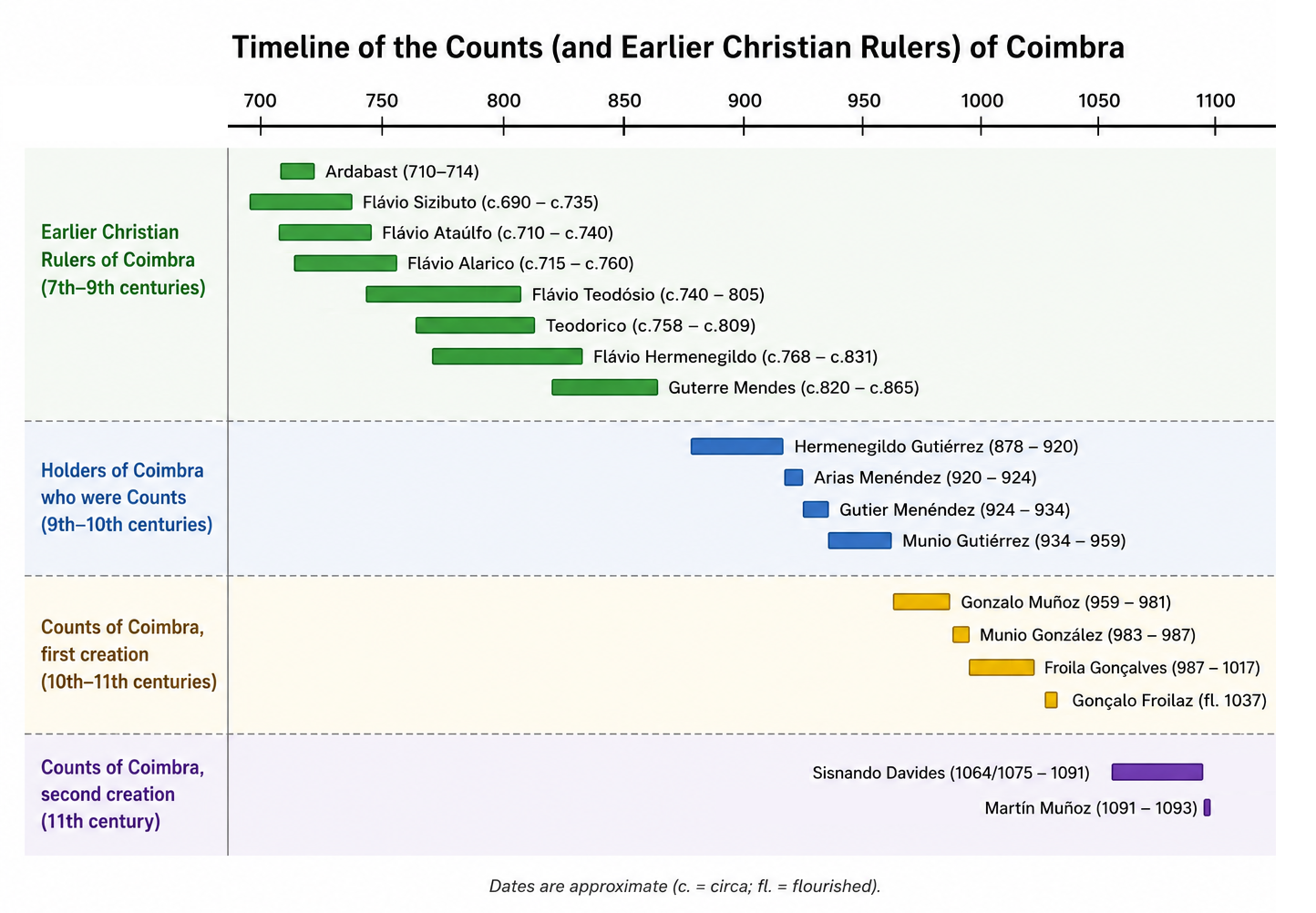
Timeline of the Counts of Coimbra

Sisnando Davides (Note: His first name is also spelled Sesnando, his patronmyic Davídez, Davídiz, Davidiz or even just David.) (died 25 August 1091) was a Mozarab nobleman and military leader of the Reconquista, born in Tentúgal, near Coimbra. He was a contemporary and acquaintance of El Cid, but his sphere of activity was in Iberia's southwest.

Much information can be gleaned about Sisnando's life from the detailed narratives that begin the diplomas issued by his Abbadid-influenced Mozarabic chancery at Coimbra, though the authenticity of these has lately come to be doubted.

== Personal life ==
Sisnando was the son of David and Susana, as documented in the records of the Lorvão Abbey. He was likely born in Tentúgal. He had two brothers, Zacarías and Mido Davídiz.

He married Loba Núñez, daughter of Nuño Méndez, the last Count of Portucale—descendant of Vímara Pérez—and his wife Goncina. This marriage between Sisnando, from an unknown lineage, and the heiress of the last Count of Portucale, might have been a contract to seal peace between the Mozarabs of Coimbra and the high nobility families of northern Portugal. The assets of Sisnando's father-in-law, Count Nuño Méndez, had been confiscated by King García of Galicia after the defeat of the Count of Portucale in the Battle of Pedroso in 1071. Alfonso VI later restored part of the confiscated properties to Loba and her husband Sisnando.

Sisnando and Loba had one daughter, Elvira Sisnández, who married Martín Muñoz, from the Ribadouro family, also known as Martín Muñoz de Montemor or Montemayor, son of Monio Fromariques and Elvira Gondesendes.

In his will, Sisnando made bequests for María, the mother of his son Alfonso Sisnández, although it is unknown whether this son was legitimate or born out of wedlock.

== Service with Seville and León ==
He was educated in Córdoba by Muslims. He was captured during a raid by Abbad II al-Mu'tadid of Seville and taken into the service of the latter. To the Arabs he was known as Shishnando. He served al-Mu'tadid as an administrator and ambassador, but he left Seville and entered the service of Ferdinand I of León in an identical capacity.

In the following years the towns of Galicia from Guimarães down to Coimbra were captured from the Moors, the latter on Sisnando's advice in 1064 or 1069, with Sisnando leading the siege and being granted the countship of the region south of the Douro from Lamego to the sea after his success. He took the title aluazir (vizier) de Coimbra.

Sisnando continued in the service of Ferdinand's successor, Alfonso VI. In March 1075 Sisnando was at Oviedo with the king—his first appearance at court—and El Cid for the opening of the Arca Santa. Later that same month he was one of many judges in a case between the bishop of Oviedo and count Vela Ovéquiz concerning the property of the monastery of San Salvador de Tol, though only he and El Cid signed the decision. Later in the year Sisnando was the principal leader of Alfonso's expedition against Seville and Granada. He took part in the expedition against Granada in 1080 as well.

Sisnando thrice (1076, 1080, and 1088) acted as an envoy from Alfonso to the taifa of Zaragoza, and on another occasion to Abdallah ibn Buluggin, the last Zirid king of Granada. To the latter Sisnando explained that the parias (tributes) that Alfonso exacted from him were intended to weaken him as a prelude to re-conquest.

== Rule of Toledo ==
Sisnando was appointed the first governor (amil) of Toledo after its fall in 1085 and he implemented the Alfonsine policy of tolerance to the Mozarabs and Mudéjars (Muslims) of the region. His appointment was probably related to his Mozarabic roots.

Sisnando counselled Alfonso to maintain good relations with al-Qadir of Toledo by acting as the taifa's governor and protector (instead of foreign overlord interfering in its internal affairs), but when this advice was ignored the way was opened for the Almoravid conquest of Toledo, which Alfonso had treated as a tributary state; following that success the Almoravids made several gains against the Castilians. According to Ramón Menéndez Pidal, if Sisnando's far-sighted advice had been heeded, the disaster of the Almoravids and the failure of Alfonso's empire to survive his death could have been averted.

Within a short time of the conquest of Toledo Sisnando fell into disfavour with Constance of Burgundy, Alfonso's second wife, and her French court, including Bernard de Sedirac, the archbishop elect of Toledo. Ibn Bassam records that Sisnando sought to convince Alfonso to spare the mosque of Toledo, though he did not. This, however, is false, as it was not King Alfonso, but Queen Constance and the new archbishop, Bernard, who reconsecrated the mosque as a Christian church.

Within six months of the conquest of Toledo, Sisnando was back in Coimbra, but he was in Toledo for the consecration of the new cathedral in December. As Sisnandus Conimbriensis consul ("consul of Coimbra") his signature appears seventh on the document of reconsecration. He had been replaced as governor of Toledo by Pedro Ansúrez (Petrus Ansuriz).

== Rule of Portugal ==
The primary reason for the re-creation of a county around Coimbra, separate from the northern County of Portugal, ruled by Sisnando, who had not attachments in northern Iberia, was to weaken the independence of the Portuguese magnates and expand central royal Leonese administration into newly conquered territories. Sisnando is first recorded ruling in Coimbra only on 1 May 1070, in a document that has come under suspicion. It is possible that his appointment to the countship was not made by Ferdinand in 1064 but rather was connected with his first appearance at Alfonso VI's court in 1075. In Portugal Sisnando built or rebuilt the castles of Coimbra, Lousã, Montemor-o-Velho, Penacova, and Penela. He also played some role in the foundation of a diocese in central Portugal, precisely at Coimbra.

A judicial document of 1077, in the name of Pelagio Gunsaluizi, an enemy of Sisnando's, refers to Sisnando as domno de tota Sancta Maria et Colimbria ("lord of all Santa Maria and Coimbra"). In a document dated 25 April 1085, Sisnando made a grant to Pedro, an abbot who had recently fled to Portugal from al-Andalus. The document refers to Sisnando as magnum ducem et consulem fidelem domnum Sisenandum ("great duke and faithful consul, lord Sisnando").

== Formation of the diocese of Coimbra ==
The appearance of a second ecclesiastical center on the Mondego River at Coimbra seems to have been a result of the operation of local forces rather than Sisnando's initiative, as an interpolated document of 13 April 1086 suggests. According to a diploma of 1086, when Paternus, Mozarab Bishop of Tortosa, came to Ferdinand I at Santiago de Compostela in 1064 on a mission from Moctadir of Zaragoza, he was approached by Sisnando, who offered him the see of Coimbra.

Between 1076 and 1080, while he was at Zaragoza, Sisnando is said to have finally convinced Paterno to come west and take up the see of Coimbra. But the document of 1 March 1088 on which this claim is made is not trustworthy and the notion that the king sent Sisnando to Zaragoza for just such a purpose as recruiting a bishop is false. A Paternus was bishop of Coimbra as early as 20 November 1078. He is last mentioned as bishop on 1 March 1088 and never appears as a confirmant of a royal document.

Apparently part of the royal agenda for the Council of Husillos of 1088 was the enhancing of royal control over Coimbra and its environs. The sole preserved document of the council was confirmed by a Martim, bishop-elect of Coimbra. Later in the same year a private document of Coimbra cited him, although still just as bishop-elect. Pierre David identified him as prior of the cathedral chapter of Coimbra and as the protégé of Sisnando Davides, who opposed the substitution of the Mozarabic rite (also known as Visigothic or Hispanic rite) for the Roman rite. But if Sisnando had proposed him and Alfonso had accepted him it is difficult to see why he was never consecrated. This obscure dispute continued for in the following year (1089) one Julian appears as bishop and in 1091 a John. They are probably the same person. In the 1091 document the bishop was given permission to make a pilgrimage to the Holy Land.

The Old Cathedral of Coimbra, distinctly Mozarabic in style, from the time of Sisnando. He is buried there.

Alfonso VI seems to have lost patience with the state of diocesan affairs in Coimbra and had secured the election of a new bishop at Eastertime of 1091. The new bishop, Cresconius, was the former abbot of Saint Bartholomew of Tui and was essentially a royal choice. He was consecrated by the archbishop of Toledo with the assistance of the bishops of Tui and Ourense. The participation of these latter, as well as later events, suggests that Cresconius would have been acceptable to Raymond of Burgundy also. But the consecration and installation of the royal candidate at Coimbra may have had to wait on the death of Sisnando.

== Last campaign and death ==
On 15 March 1087 Sisnando dictated a testament in procinctu on the occasion of his leaving for a campaign with Alfonso against Yusuf ibn Tashfin, the Almoravid general. Sisnando died on 25 August 1091, after more than twenty years of semi-independent rule at Coimbra. He was buried in the Old Cathedral of Coimbra and was succeeded by his son-in-law Martín Muñoz.

The County of Coimbra disappeared as an autonomous fief in 1093, having been integrated into the Second County of Portugal at the moment of its restoration in 1095 under Henry of Burgundy.

== Sources ==
- Catlos, Brian A. (2004). The Victors and the Vanquished: Christians and Muslims of Catalonia and Aragon, 1050 – 1300. Cambridge Studies in Medieval Life and Thought, Fourth Series, 59. Cambridge: Cambridge University Press. ISBN 0-521-82234-3.
- Menéndez Pidal, Ramón; García Gómez, Emilio (1947). "El conde mozárabe Sisnando Davídiz y la política de Alfonso VI con los Taifas". Al-Ándalus. 12 (1): 27–41. ISSN 0304-4335.
- Reilly, Bernard F. (1989). The Kingdom of León-Castilla under King Alfonso VI, 1065 – 1109. Princeton: Princeton University Press.
