= Flávio Hermenegildo =

6th Count of Coimbra (c. 768 – c. 831)

- Count of Coimbra
- Predecessor: Teodorico de Coimbra
- Successor: Guterre Mendes
- Other names: Flávio Hermenegildo Teudis
- Born: c. 768
- Died: c. 831; Asturias
- Father: Flávio Teodosio
- Mother: Munia Sueira

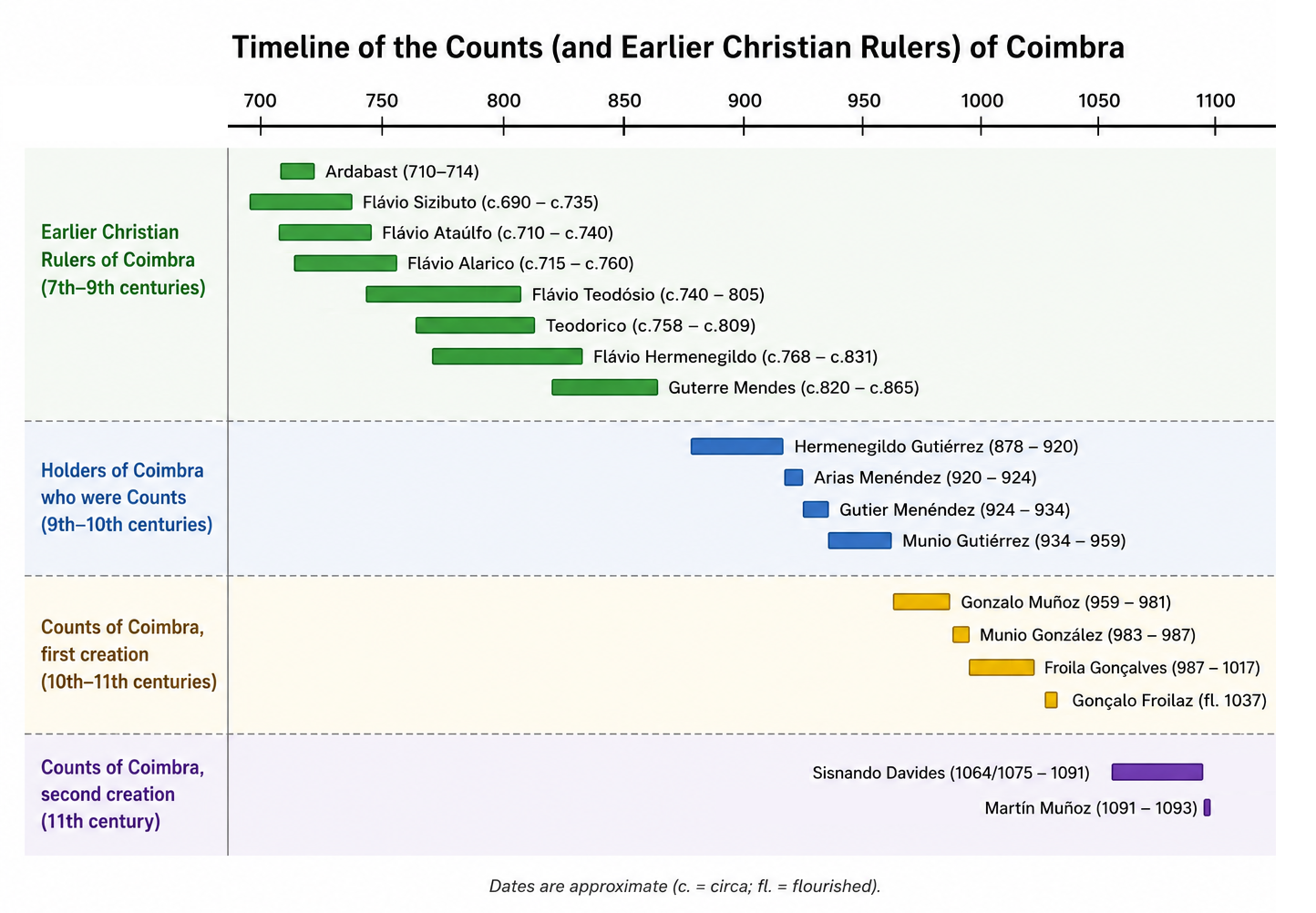
Timeline of the Counts of Coimbra

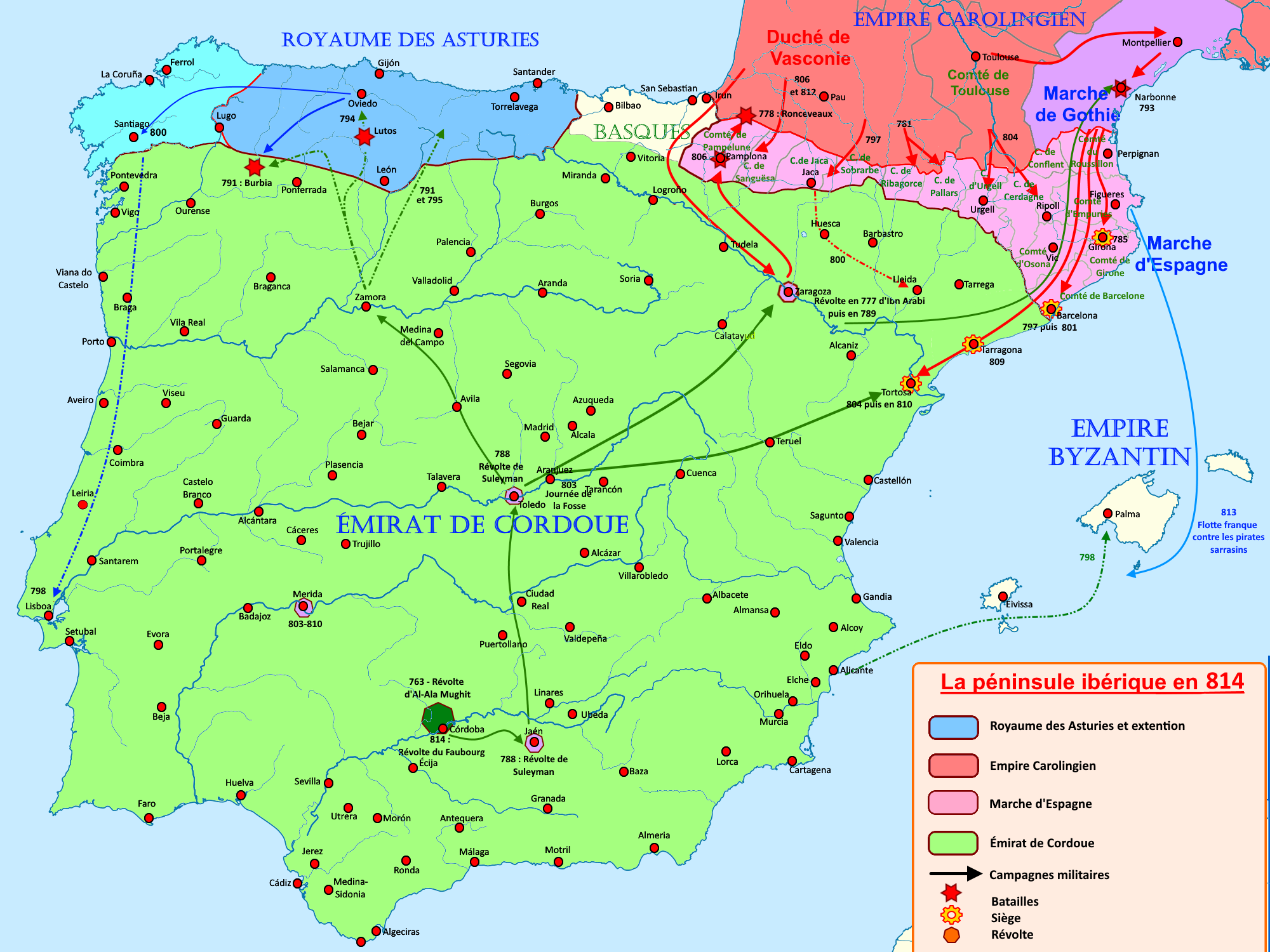
Iberian Peninsula in 814

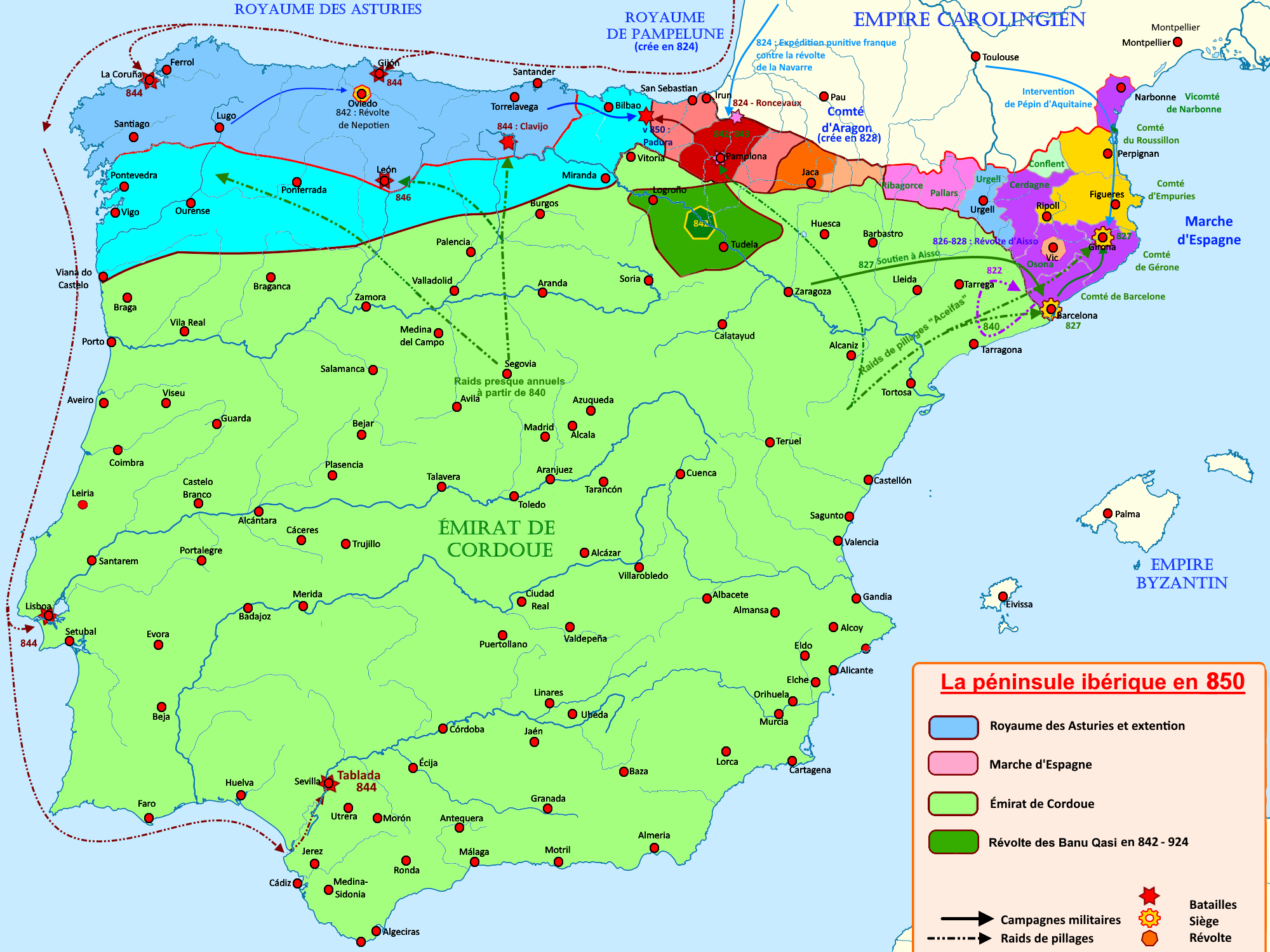
Iberian Peninsula between 814 and 850

Flávio Hermenegildo (c. 768 – c. 831), also known as Flávio Hermenegildo Teudis, was the 6th Count of Coimbra.

The County of Coimbra, during his time, encompassed lands that are part of modern-day Portugal, including Coimbra, Viseu, Lamego, and Santa Maria da Feira. This region was a significant frontier zone during the Reconquista, with its control frequently contested between Christian and Muslim forces. Flávio's tenure was characterized by the challenges of maintaining control over Coimbra amid the broader conflicts between Christian and Muslim forces.

== Biography ==
Born around 768, he was the son of Flávio Teodósio and brother of Teodorico, the previous count of Coimbra.

In 815, following the death of Abbot Eugénio of Lorvão, a last protector of the Christians who still had some credibility with the Islamic authorities, Flávio abandoned Coimbra. He went into the service of Alfonso II of Asturias, having been governor of Braga, Porto and Tui.

Hermenegildo married twice, had at least one son, Guterre Mendes.

He died c. 831, in Asturias, Spain, at the age of 65.
