= Flávio Alarico =

Visigothic knight, 3rd Count of Coimbra (c. 715 – c. 760)

- Count of Coimbra
- Predecessor: Flávio Ataúlfo de Coimbra
- Successor: Flávio Teodosio
- Other names: Flávio Atanarico de Coimbra
- Born: c.715
- Died: c.760
- Spouse: Toda (or Teuda)
- Issue: Flávio Teodosio
- Father: Flávio Sisebuto de Coimbra
- Mother: Andulfa (or Sindoinda)

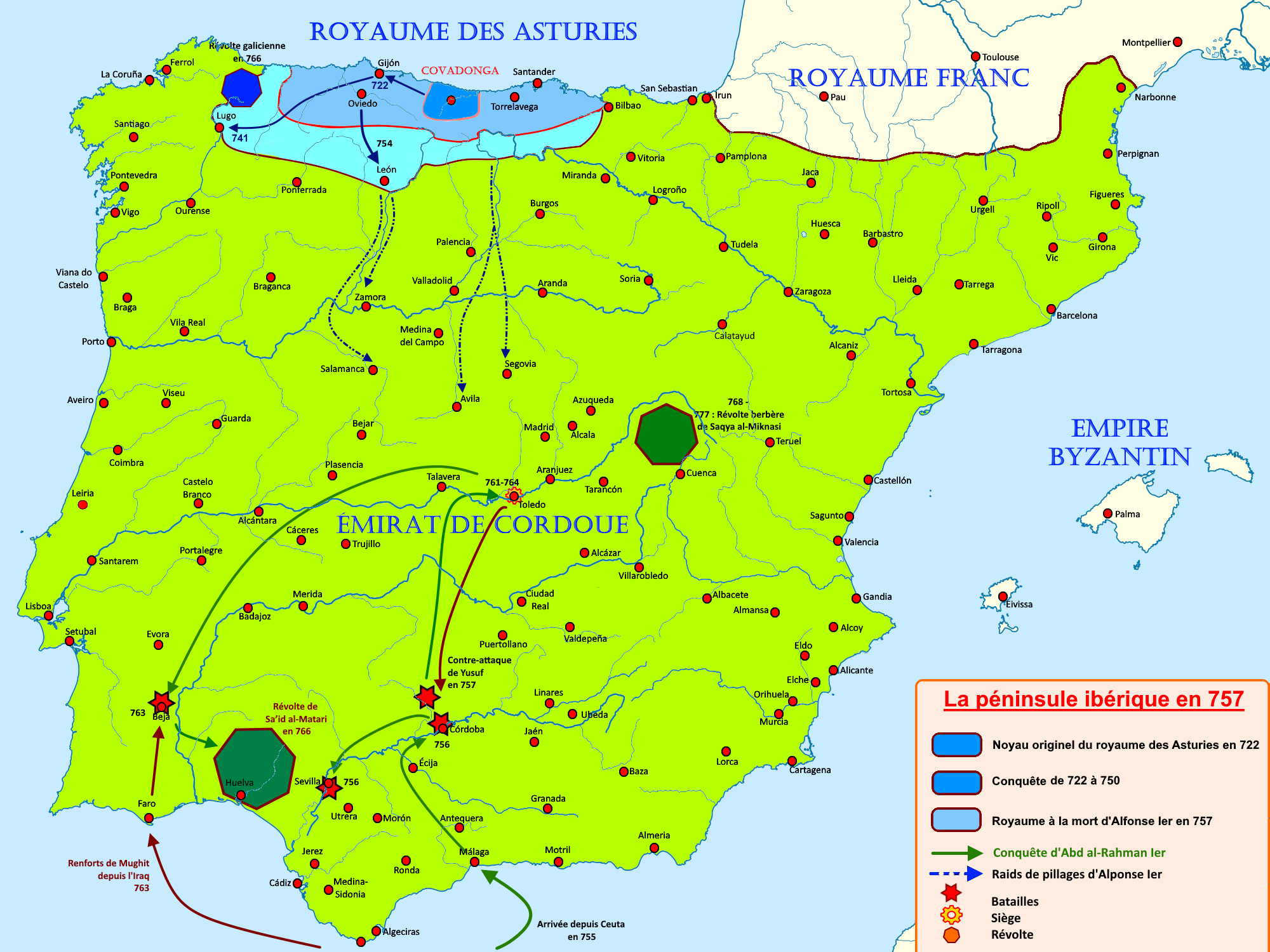
Iberian Peninsula in 757

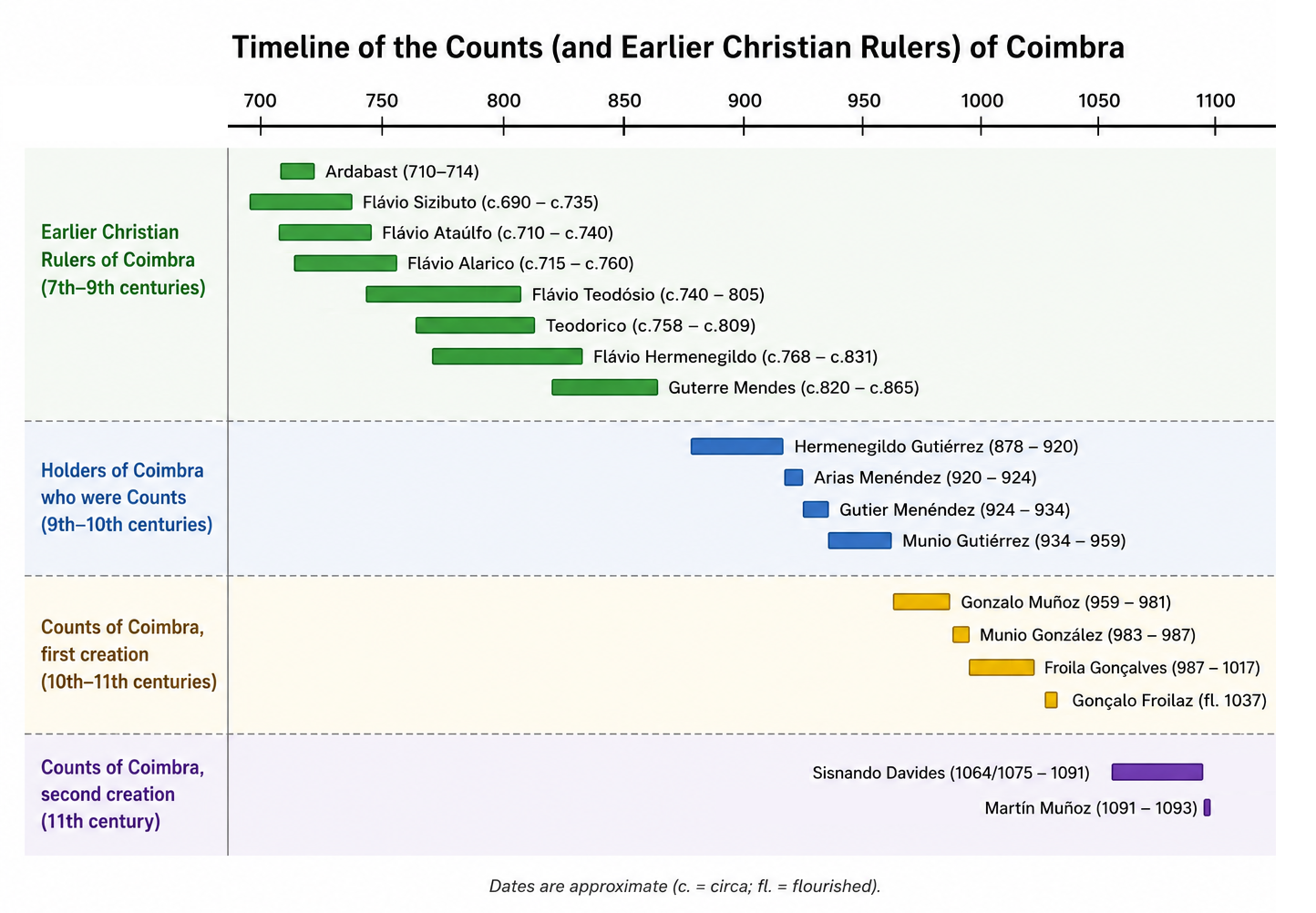
Timeline of the Counts of Coimbra

Flávio Alarico, also known as Flávio Atanarico de Coimbra (c.715 - c.760) was a nobleman and 3rd Count of Coimbra. His title as Count of Coimbra positioned him as a significant figure in the region, as Coimbra became a key area in the Christian Reconquista and the eventual establishment of the Kingdom of Portugal.

Coimbra, like many other cities in early Al-Andalus, had a significant Christian population (known as Mozarabs), who were allowed to maintain their faith in exchange for paying the jizya (a tax levied on non-Muslims). The use of "count" (comes) in his title, a remnant of Visigothic nobility, reflects the continuation of older Roman and Gothic administrative traditions in the city.

== Biography ==
Flávio was the son of Flávio Sisebuto de Coimbra (Judge of Coimbra). He married Toda (or Teuda) and they had a son: Flávio Teodósio (c.740 - 805).
