= Flávio Guimarães =

Brazilian singer (born 1963)

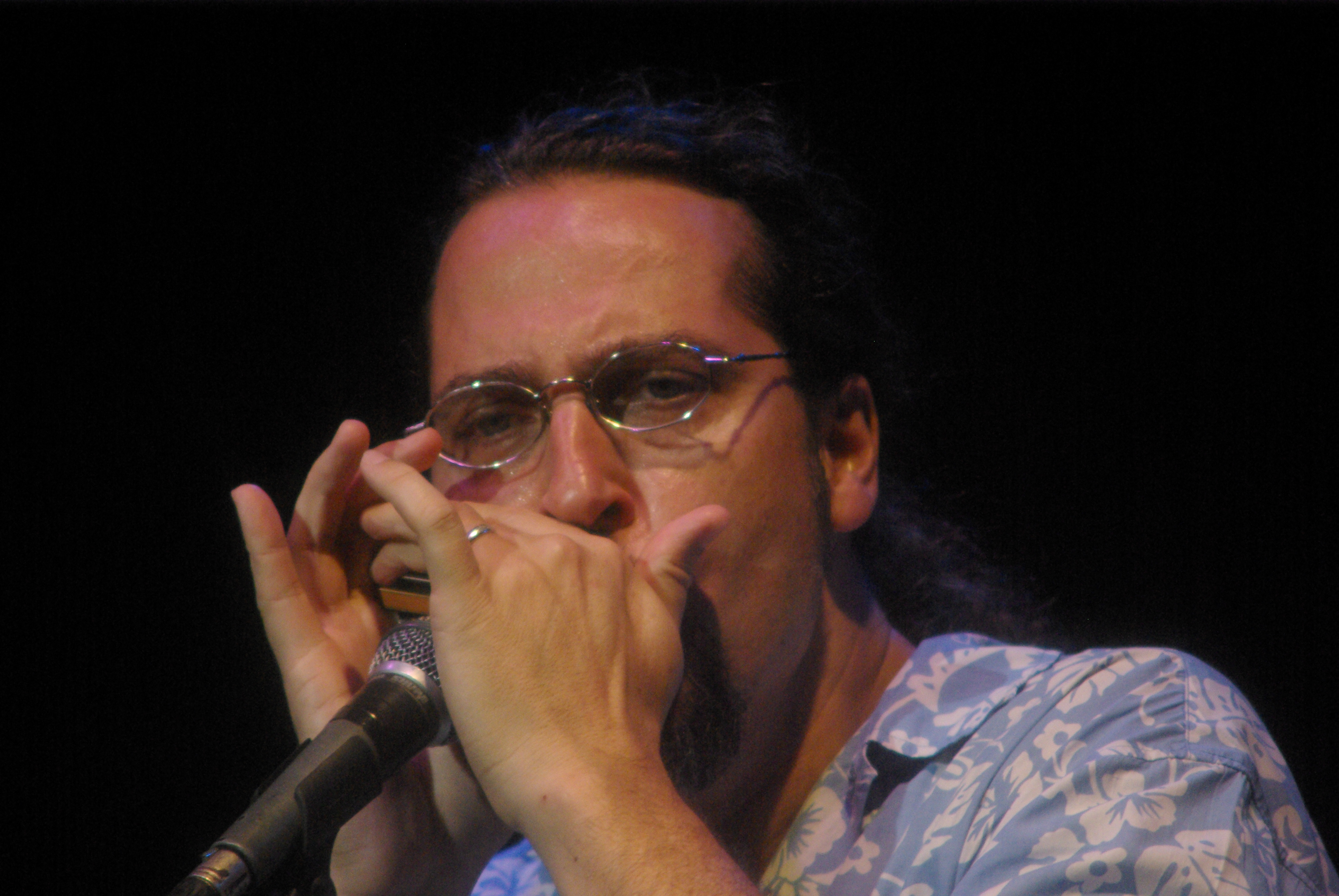
- Flávio Guimarães

Background information
- Born: Flávio Guimarães Borges; November 10, 1963 (age 62)
- Origin: Rio de Janeiro, Rio de Janeiro, Brazil
- Genres: blues
- Occupations: Singer, composer
- Instruments: Vocals, harmonica
- Years active: 1985–present
- Labels: Veras, Eldorado, Natasha, Abril Music, Trama, Chico Blues Records, Delira Blues
- Website: http://www.flavioguimaraes.com.br/

Flávio Guimarães (born November 10, 1963) is a Brazilian composer, harmonica player and singer. Considered a blues pioneer in Brazil, he founded the band Blues Etílicos in 1986, which is considered the most successful Brazilian blues group. He has also played with many famous artists along his career, such as Alceu Valença, Ed Motta, Luiz Melodia, Paulo Moura, Zeca Baleiro, Buddy Guy, Charlie Musselwhite, Sugar Blue and Taj Mahal.

== Biography ==
Flávio Guimarães was born in Rio de Janeiro, Brazil. There he studied harmonica with Maurício Einhorn.

He started his musical career around 1985. In 1986, he formed the group Blues Etílicos, with Greg Wilson (vocals and guitar), Otávio Rocha (guitar), Gil Eduardo (drums) and Cláudio Bedran (bass). With the group, Guimarães did many show around Brazil and the world, and recorded several albums.

In 1988, Guimarães travelled to Chicago, where he played with many American musicians, including the harmonicist Sugar Blue. One year later, he opened Festival de Blues, in Ribeirão Preto, São Paulo, Brazil, playing with Buddy Guy. In that same year, he also opened shows for John Lee Hooker and John Mayall, during Free Jazz Festival. In the following years, Guimarães played in the most important festivals in Brazil, such as Blues Fest, Rock in Rio II, and Nescafé in Blues. During this period, he also played with many famous Brazilian artists, like Ed Motta, Roberto Frejat and Paulo Moura, as well as with international artists such as Midnight Blues Band.

Since 1990, when Bizz magazine indicated Guimarães as one of the best harmonicists of Brazil, he has participated in many harmonica player meetings. In fact, Guimarães became famous among Brazilian harmonicists because he was the first one to play diatonic harmonicas in that country, introducing new possibilities of timbre to the music of his nation. In 1998, he participated in Harmonica's Night, with Carey Bell and Peter Madcat. In this same period, with a new band, he opened for B. B. King, in Via Funchal, Brazil. He, with Tavares da Gaita, was considered one of the most important attractions in the history of the Rec-Beat festival, in Recife, Brazil.

Along his career, Guimarães recorded many albums. His first solo album was Little blues, in 1995. In 2000, he recorded his second album, named On the loose. In 2007, celebrating 20 years of Blues Etílicos, his band recorded an album in honor of Muddy Waters, one of the biggest exponent blues musician. Around two years later, Guimarães recorded another solo album, named The blues follows me, and he toured Brazil extensively, promoting this work.

== Discography ==
=== Solo albums ===
- 1995: Little blues, Eldorado
- 2000: On the loose, Eldorado
- 2003: Navegaita, Eldorado
- 2006: Flávio Guimarães e Prado Blues Band, Chico Blues Records, with Prado Blues Band
- 2007: Vivo, Delira Blues
- 2009: The blues follows me

=== With Blues Etílicos ===
- 1988: Blues Etílicos, Satisfaction
- 1989: Água mineral, Eldorado
- 1990: San-Ho-Zay, Eldorado
- 1991: IV, Eldorado
- 1994: Salamandra, Natasha Records
- 1996: Dente de ouro, Excelente discos
- 2001: Águas barrentas, Eldorado
- 2003: Cor do Universo
- 2007: Viva Muddy Waters, Delira Blues
