= Flávio Prado =

Brazilian sports journalist (born 1954)

- Born: February 11, 1954 (age 72); São Paulo, Brazil
- Occupations: Sports journalist, university professor, coach and lawyer
- Children: 2

Flávio Corrêa do Prado Sobrinho, better known as Flávio Prado (born February 11, 1954) is a Brazilian sports journalist, university professor, coach and lawyer.

He has covered ten World Cups and news events in over 60 countries.

== Career ==
His beginnings were on Rádio ABC, in Santo André. Afterwards he worked on several other vehicles. He was from A Gazeta Esportiva, Rádio Gazeta, TV Gazeta, Rádio Record, where he formed a special sports team, with Silvio Luiz and Pedro Luiz Paoliello at his side. At that time, Flávio Prado and Silvio Luiz ran for the presidency of the São Paulo Football Federation twice. But they did it in a joking way, so much so that the first time they went to the headquarters in a cart and the second time in an ambulance. They said they were there to save Brazilian football. At Rede Record, he also worked on the sports team.

At Rede Bandeirantes, Flávio Prado became an international commentator.

Afterwards, he made a name for himself on TV Cultura, where he presented the Cartão Verde for 13 years, awarded by the APCA in the television category.

Then he went to Gazeta Esportiva and TV Gazeta.

On the radio, in 1990, he was hired by Jovem Pan, at first as a reporter, then as a presenter and commentator. At Pan, he also hosted the program No Mundo da Bola, for which he received the APCA award in the radio category on two occasions. He was in charge of the program until 2021.

From August 2003 to February 2023, after Roberto Avallone left TV Gazeta, he presented the traditional Mesa Redonda on Sundays and participated in the Gazeta Esportiva program during the week. He was the creator of the Troféu Mesa Redonda, a major award in Brazilian football, organized by TV Gazeta since 2004.

In February 2023, Flávio Prado announced via social networks his departure from TV Gazeta, after not having his contract with the broadcaster renewed. Despite this, Prado was not completely disassociated from the Cásper Líbero Foundation, which maintains the station. He continues as professor of the Graduate Course in Sports Journalism at Faculdade Cásper Líbero in São Paulo.

== Personal life ==
Flávio Prado is married to Isabel Vaz Marlone do Prado, with whom he has two children: Rita Graziella Vaz Marlone do Prado, pop and rock singer, and Bruno Prado, sports journalist.

He is a fan of Ponte Preta.
