= Flávio Teodosio =

4th Count of Coimbra (c. 740 – 805)

Flávio Teodósio
- Count of Coimbra
- Predecessor: Flávio Alarico
- Successor: Teodorico de Coimbra
- Other names: Flávio Thiodo, Flávio Teudo
- Born: c. 740
- Died: 805
- Spouse: Munia Sueira
- Issue: Teodorico, Ataulfo, Flávio Hermenegildo, Mencia or Menaya, Ausenda
- Father: Flávio Alarico
- Mother: Flávia Teodia Atenerico

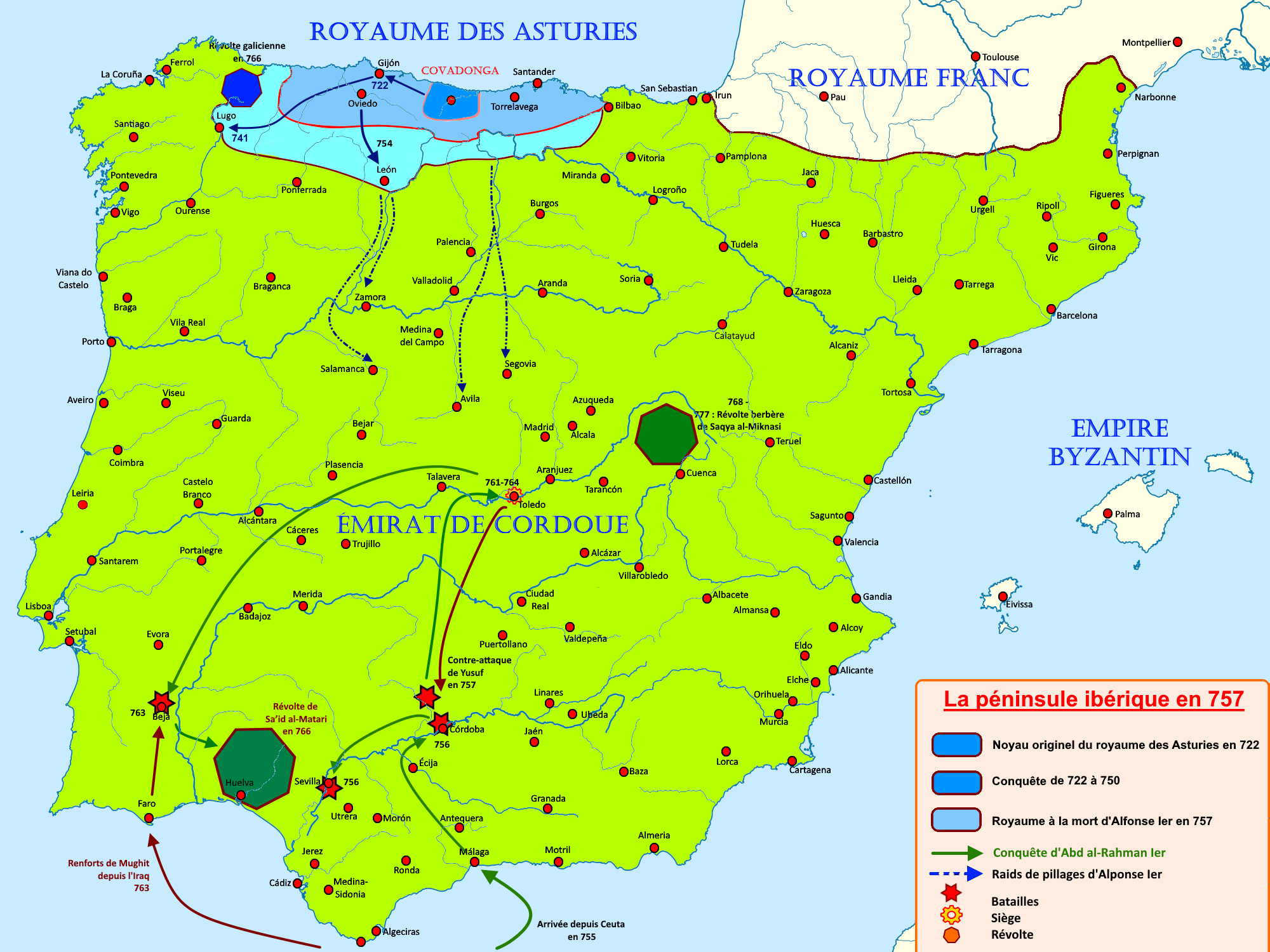
Iberian Peninsula in 757

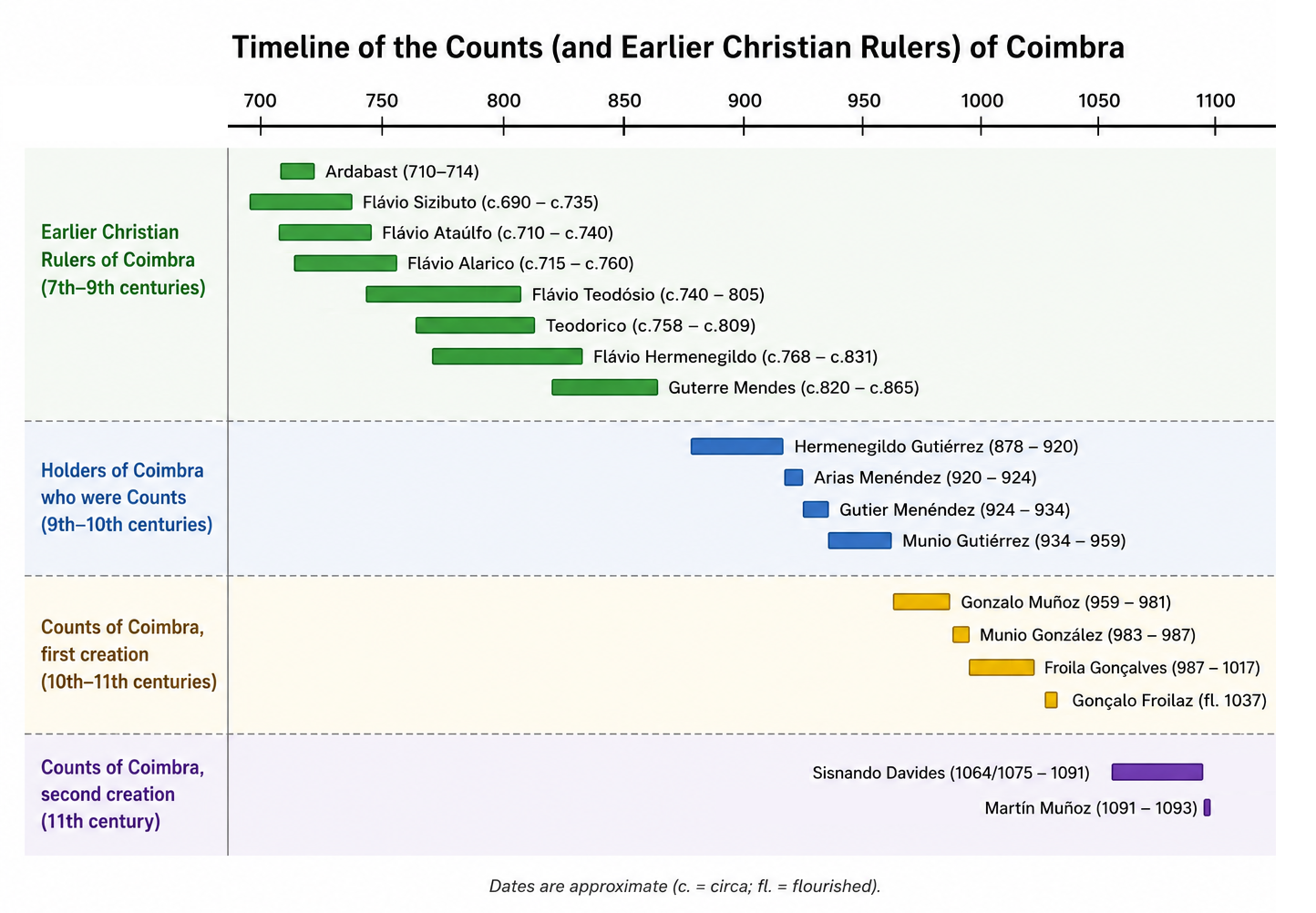
Timeline of the Counts of Coimbra

Flávio Teodósio, also known as Flávio Thiodo or Flávio Teudo (c. 740 – 805) was a nobleman and 4th Count of Coimbra.

== Background ==
Coimbra, an important strategic and cultural center in what is now Portugal, had fallen under Muslim control following the Umayyad invasion of the Iberian Peninsula in the early 8th century. However, like many other cities in early Al-Andalus, it also had a significant Christian population (known as Mozarabs), who were allowed to maintain their faith in exchange for paying the jizya (a tax levied on non-Muslims).

== Title ==
The use of "count" in Flávio Teodosio's title, a remnant of Visigothic nobility, reflects the continuation of older Roman and Gothic administrative traditions in the city. The title is mentioned in the documentation of a donation that Flávio Teodósio himself made to Lorvão Abbey. In these documents he signed himself as "Theoddus Comes Christianorum". The donation to the Abbey consisted of two estates in Almofalla, in the person of Abbot Aydulpho.

Primary sources about Flávio Teodósio's life are scarce, with much of the information derived from the works of medieval chroniclers like Rodrigo Jiménez de Rada.

== Biography ==
Flávio Teodosio was the son of Flávio Alarico Count of Coimbra, and Flávia Teodia Atenerico.

In the context of Yahsubit revolts against the power of Cordoba with the support of the Mozarab population, Marwân ibn Zor’a, the representative of Emir Abd al-Rahmân I grew suspicious of Flávio Teodósio. The abbot of Lorvão is said to have pleaded for Flávio Teodósio's life twice, and this was the origin of the mentioned donation to the said Abbey.

He married Maria or Mencia from whom he had:

- Teodorico (c. 758 – c. 809), successor
- Ataulfo, bishop of Iria
- Flávio Hermenegildo (c. 768 – c. 831), successor after Teodorico
- Mencia or Menaya
- Ausenda, wife of Bermudo I
