= Flávio Deslandes =

Brazilian industrial designer

Flavio Deslandes
- Born: Brazil
- Occupation: Industrial designer
- Known for: Bamboo bicycles
- Website: http://www.flaviodeslandes.com

Flavio Deslandes is a Brazilian industrial designer based in Denmark and known for his work with bamboo including the bamboo bicycles.

== Career ==
Deslandes started his scientific research with bamboo technology at PUC-Rio University from 1994 to 1999 where he participated in projects about developing tools for working with bamboo – composites, structures, truss-frames, joint and connection solutions, aids and appliances for handicapped such as walkers and amphibian sliders.

In 1995 he started to develop his first bamboo bicycle, and the first prototype was presented at the 5th International World Bamboo Congress in 1998. Deslandes graduated in 1999 with his bamboo bicycle prototype no. 2 as his final project. The prototype no. 2 has a tensegrity frame.

Deslandes' first bamboo patent was applied for in 1999 and granted in 2005.

After moving to Denmark in 2000, Deslandes launched a criss-cross bamboo tube frame which he named Bambucicletas. The Bambucicletas made use of bamboo for other parts such as the fork and fenders.

By 2001 Deslandes' Bambucicletas reached the web with an article in American Bamboo Society. Bambucicletas not only brought back the subject about sustainability by using bamboo to build bicycles, but it also inspired many people around the world to the possibilities that the material was offering. The article was later translated to several different languages.

Deslandes co-developed a bamboo bicycle for Biomega in 2001.

Deslandes' Bambucicletas has been mentioned George H. Marcus' 2002 book What Is Design Today? and in Oscar Hidalgo-Lopez' 2003 book Bamboo The Gift of the Gods.

Deslandes spoke about bamboo bicycles at TEDx SaoPaulo in 2009.
