= Montemor-o-Velho =

- Municipality
- Town of Montemor-o-Velho
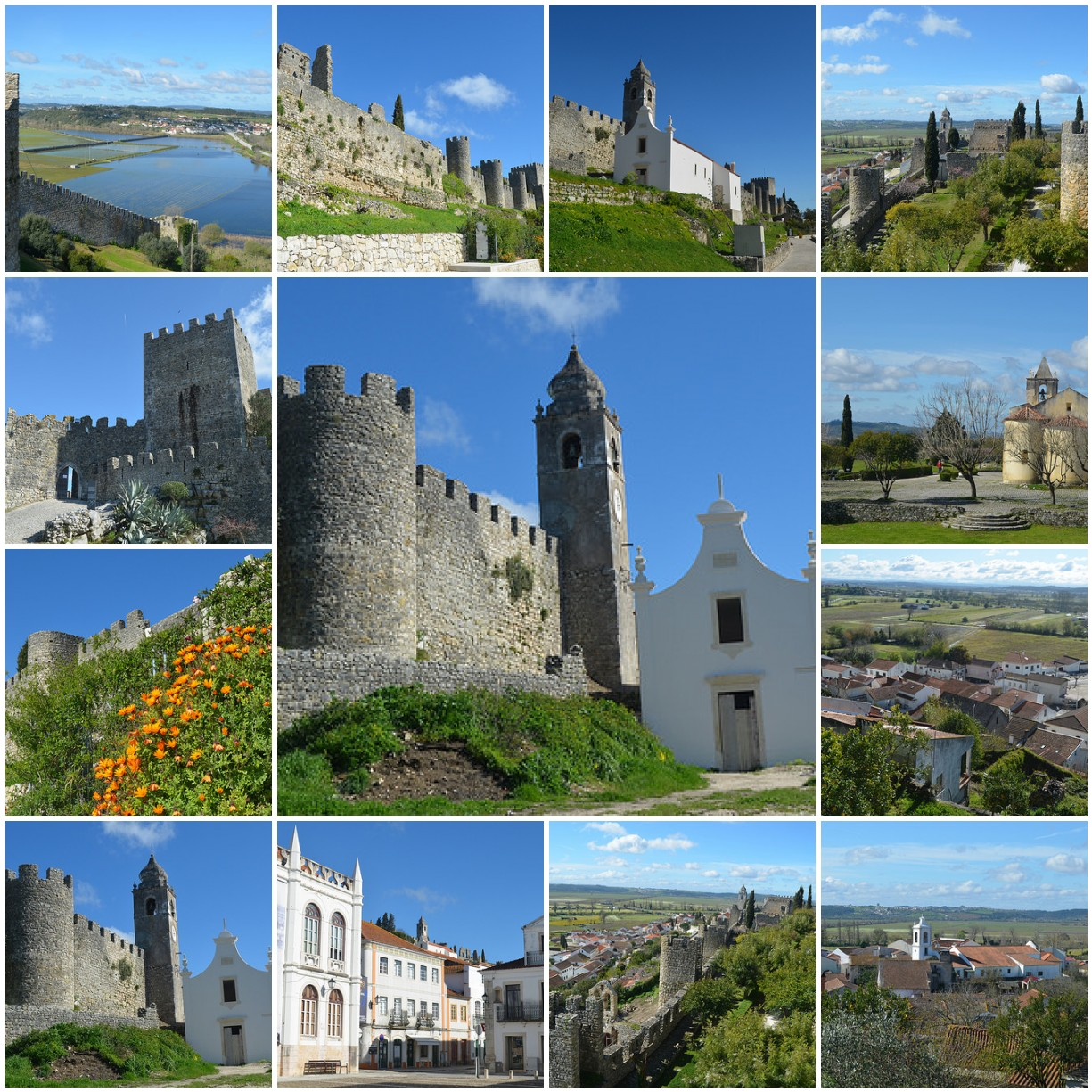
- Montemor-o-Velho

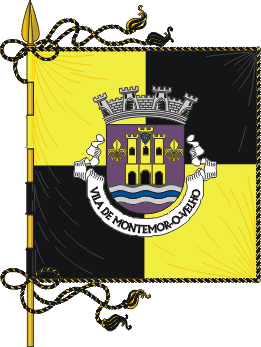
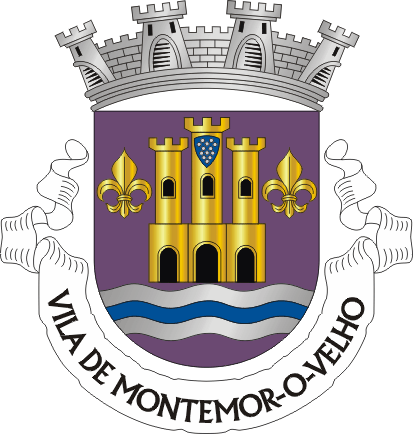
- Flag Coat of arms
- Interactive map of Montemor-o-Velho
- Coordinates: 40°10′N 8°41′W
- Country: Portugal
- Region: Centro
- Intermunic. comm.: Região de Coimbra
- District: Coimbra
- Parishes: 11

Government
  - President: Luís Manuel Barbosa Marques Leal (PSD)

Area
  - Total: 228.96 km^{2} (88.40 sq mi)

Population (2011)
  - Total: 26,171
  - Density: 114.30/km^{2} (296.05/sq mi)
- Time zone: UTC+00:00 (WET)
  - Summer (DST): UTC+01:00 (WEST)
- Local holiday: 8 September
- Website: http://www.cm-montemorvelho.pt/

Montemor-o-Velho (Portuguese pronunciation: [mõtɨˈmɔɾ u ˈvɛʎu]), officially the Town of Montemor-o-Velho (Portuguese: Vila de Montemor-o-Velho), is a town and municipality of the Coimbra District, in Portugal. The population of the municipality in 2011 was 26,171, in an area of 228.96 km².

== History ==
In 711, the Arab occupation of the Iberian Peninsula began. Montemor-o-Velho, a fluvial-maritime port of great importance at the time, was the target of conquests and reconquests throughout the 9th to the 12th centuries: in 848 the first Christian reconquest of Montemor was made by king Ramiro I of León, who gave the castle to abbot João, who resisted in the same year the siege made by the caliph of Córdoba Abd al-Rahman II. In 878 Afonso III the Great occupied Coimbra and proceeded to repopulate the Mondego line; on December 2, 990 there was another onslaught of Arabs led by Almançor, who take the castle of Montemor-o-Velho, and its government is given to Froila Gonçalves, a descendant of the Portucalense count Gonçalo Moniz. This was dislodged during the reign of Alfonso V of León, by Mendo Luz, who recovered it for the Christians, later passing it on to Gonçalo Vieigas.

In 1026 the Arabs conquered Montemor-o-Velho again, and in 1034 Gonçalo Trastamires recovered it again for the Christians, becoming its governor. After new Arab attacks, Fernando Magno, in 1064, definitively conquers Coimbra and the Mondego line, giving its government to Count D. Sisnando Davides, a Mozarab native of a settlement located in the vicinity of Montemor-o-Velho called Tentúgal. Raimundo, ruler of Galicia, personally governing Coimbra, gave a letter of settlement to Montemor in February 1095.

At this time the river was the border between the Christian north and the Arab south, and a line of fortifications was built that included the castles of Avô, on the river Alva, Penacova, Lousã, Coimbra, Penela, Soure and Montemor. There is a curious popular legend about the origin of Montemor. It tells that a deep rivalry opposed the inhabitants of Montemor and Maiorca, because each one considered his land to be placed at a higher point than the other. To annoy the Majorcans, those from Montemor shouted: "Monte... Mor! (Major... Hill!)", to which the Majorcan's retorted "Maior... Cá! (Bigger... Here!)". The fact is that in 1212 the town was called Mons Maiores or Montis Maioris, to which -o-Velho was added when king Sancho I of Portugal rebuilt the Alentejo town of Montemor-o-Novo. Already in the period of nationality, Sancho I left Montemor-o-Velho in testament to his daughter, Teresa, who, with her sister Sancha, gave charter to the village in May of 1212. It grew, following a demographic boom throughout the Lower Mondego, with the consequent clearing of new land for cultivation and creation of new settlements, as can be seen in the toponymy which records numerous Casais and Póvoas. Besides the royal lords, the lands of the concelho (municipality) were distributed by the main ecclesiastic institutions of the region (Monastery of Santa Cruz of Coimbra, Monastery of Santa Clara, Monastery of Lorvão).

King Afonso III of Portugal donated the village to his daughter, Branca, abbess of Huelgas and Lorvão. It was in the castle citadel that king Afonso IV of Portugal and his advisors met on January 6, 1355, to decide the fate of Inês de Castro. They left on the following day to execute the plan. After the siege of Torres Novas, the Master of Avis, João, passed through Montemor-o-Velho, where he received the honors of the mayor and the people, and went on to Coimbra where he was acclaimed king by the Cortes. João I granted the lordship to his son Peter, who stayed there for some time. King João II of Portugal, by testament of September 29, 1495, donated Coimbra as a dukedom to his natural son, Jorge, including in the donation Montemor-o-Velho, which will remain in the House of the Dukes of Aveiro until 1759.

On August 20, 1516, king Manuel I of Portugal gave a new charter (foral) to Montemor-o-Velho; this document is of particular importance for the analysis of the way of life of the people of Montemor at the beginning of the 16th century. It is also at this time that there was an important change in the local economy due to the introduction of maize corn in the fields of the Mondego, brought from The Americas, which led to an era of prosperity that lasted until the seventeenth century. The county's development was then based on three population centers: Montemor-o-Velho, Pereira and Tentúgal. In their fields, besides corn, linen and wheat were produced, cattle and horses were raised, manors were built, churches and convents were remodeled. From this period stand out the figures of Diogo de Azambuja, Fernão Mendes Pinto and Jorge de Montemor.

The decadence seems to have started in the beginning of the 17th century and continued into the 18th century; in 1771 Figueira da Foz, in the Atlantic coast, was elevated to town and, consequently, the importance of Montemor diminished.

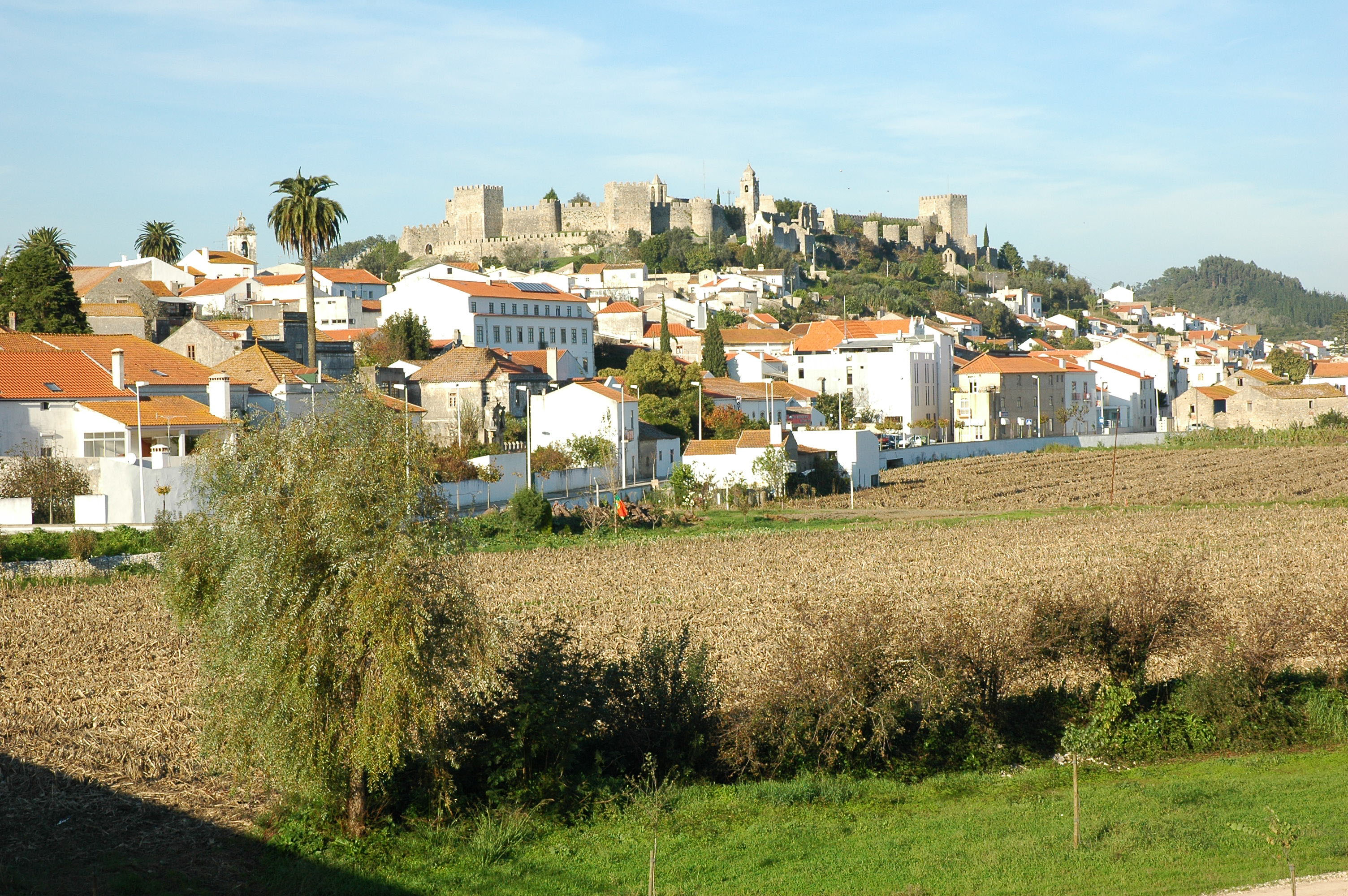

With the introduction of rice cultivation in the beginning of the 19th century, there is a new development surge. Indeed, the production did not stop increasing, becoming one of the main sources of wealth of the municipality of Montemor-o-Velho (in 1923, the production in 466 ha was 700,000 kg and in 1934 in 1,423 ha it was 2,135,000 kg).

In 1826 the municipality was made up of the parishes of Alfarelos, Brunhós, Carapinheira, Figueiró do Campo, Gatões, Gesteira, Granja do Ulmeiro, Liceia, Vila Nova da Barca, Alcáçova, S. Miguel, S. Salvador, S. Martinho and Madalena. With the administrative restructuring of 1853, the county took the almost definitive form: the parishes of Verride, Santo Varão, Cadima and Tentúgal were extinct and the parishes of Arazede, Liceia, Pereira, Santo Varão, Reveles, Verride, Vila Nova da Barca, Meãs do Campo and Tentúgal were integrated in the county. In 1928 the parish of Abrunheira was created (by extinguishing Reveles), in 1943 the parish of Gatões was created (by dismembering Seixo de Gatões) and in 1984 the parish of Ereira was created (by dismembering Verride).

== Climate ==
Climate data for Montemor-o-Velho, 1971-2000 normals and extremes
| Month | Jan | Feb | Mar | Apr | May | Jun | Jul | Aug | Sep | Oct | Nov | Dec | Year |
|---|---|---|---|---|---|---|---|---|---|---|---|---|---|
| Record high °C (°F) | 22.5 (72.5) | 25.3 (77.5) | 28.2 (82.8) | 31.0 (87.8) | 34.5 (94.1) | 40.5 (104.9) | 39.8 (103.6) | 40.3 (104.5) | 38.2 (100.8) | 34.0 (93.2) | 26.4 (79.5) | 22.8 (73.0) | 40.5 (104.9) |
| Mean daily maximum °C (°F) | 14.5 (58.1) | 15.7 (60.3) | 17.7 (63.9) | 18.7 (65.7) | 20.6 (69.1) | 23.8 (74.8) | 26.1 (79.0) | 26.4 (79.5) | 25.5 (77.9) | 21.9 (71.4) | 17.9 (64.2) | 15.3 (59.5) | 20.3 (68.6) |
| Daily mean °C (°F) | 9.7 (49.5) | 11.0 (51.8) | 12.6 (54.7) | 13.9 (57.0) | 16.1 (61.0) | 18.8 (65.8) | 20.8 (69.4) | 20.7 (69.3) | 19.5 (67.1) | 16.4 (61.5) | 12.8 (55.0) | 10.8 (51.4) | 15.3 (59.5) |
| Mean daily minimum °C (°F) | 4.8 (40.6) | 6.3 (43.3) | 7.4 (45.3) | 9.0 (48.2) | 11.5 (52.7) | 13.9 (57.0) | 15.4 (59.7) | 15.0 (59.0) | 13.5 (56.3) | 10.9 (51.6) | 7.7 (45.9) | 6.3 (43.3) | 10.1 (50.2) |
| Record low °C (°F) | −6.0 (21.2) | −3.8 (25.2) | −2.6 (27.3) | −0.2 (31.6) | 3.6 (38.5) | 6.6 (43.9) | 9.0 (48.2) | 8.0 (46.4) | 3.0 (37.4) | −2.5 (27.5) | −2.5 (27.5) | −3.8 (25.2) | −6.0 (21.2) |
| Average rainfall mm (inches) | 120.5 (4.74) | 107.4 (4.23) | 64.0 (2.52) | 78.1 (3.07) | 74.5 (2.93) | 31.7 (1.25) | 9.6 (0.38) | 11.9 (0.47) | 43.1 (1.70) | 104.0 (4.09) | 117.1 (4.61) | 128.9 (5.07) | 890.8 (35.06) |
| Average precipitation days (≥ 0.1 mm) | 13.4 | 12.4 | 9.1 | 10.9 | 9.7 | 4.7 | 1.9 | 2.2 | 5.1 | 10.7 | 12.3 | 12.7 | 105.1 |
Source: Instituto de Meteorologia

== Demographics ==
Population Montemor-o-Velho Municipality (1801–2011)
| 1801 | 1849 | 1900 | 1930 | 1960 | 1981 | 1991 | 2001 | 2004 | 2006 | 2011 |
| 9528 | 6345 | 22361 | 25162 | 27925 | 27274 | 26375 | 25478 | 25082 | 24950 | 26171 |

== Parishes ==
Administratively, the municipality is divided into 11 civil parishes (freguesias):

- Abrunheira, Verride e Vila Nova da Barca
- Arazede
- Carapinheira
- Ereira
- Gatões e Montemor-o-Velho
- Liceia
- Meãs do Campo
- Pereira
- Santo Varão
- Seixo de Gatões
- Tentúgal

== Economy ==
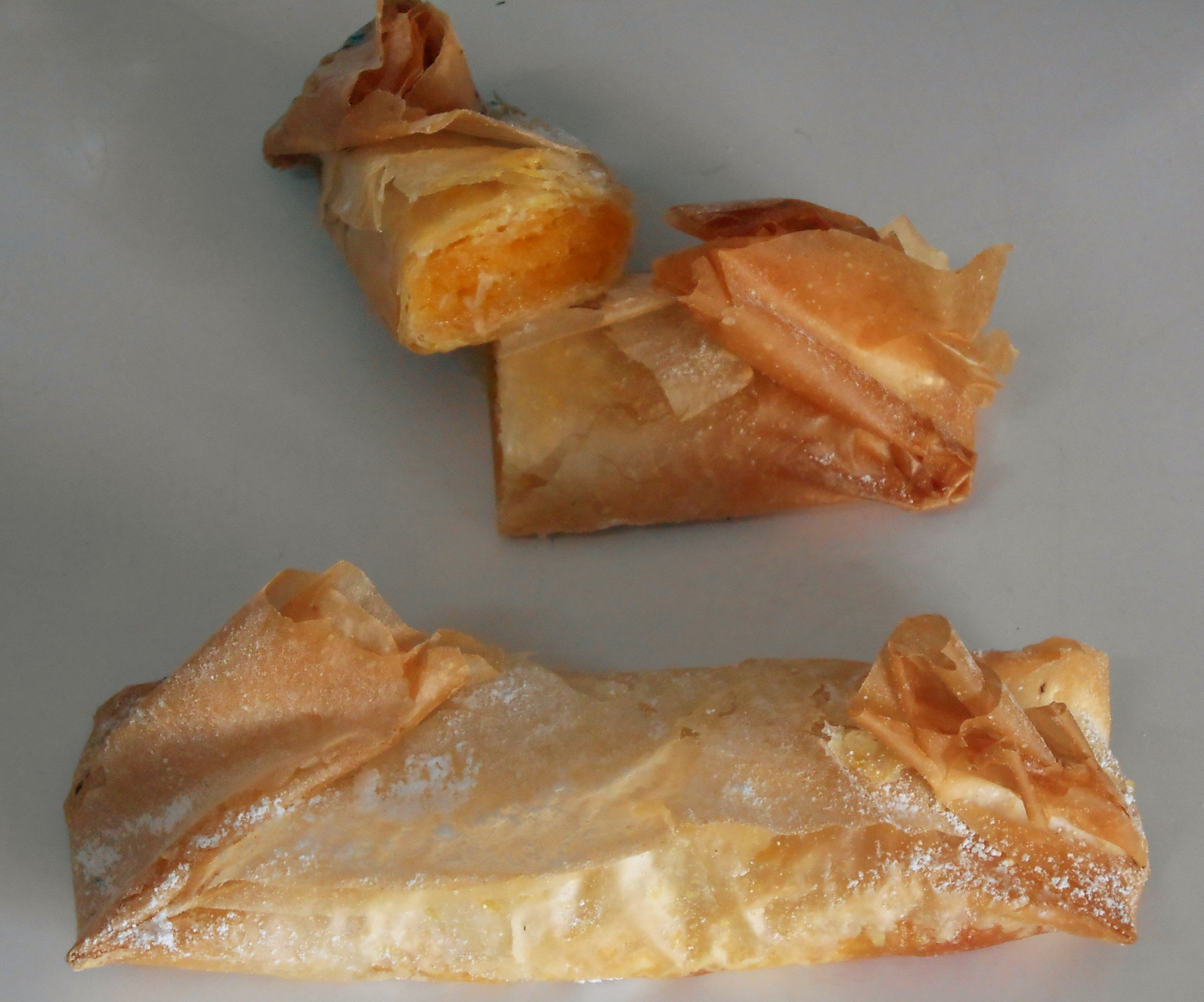
Pastel de Tentúgal.

The municipality of Montemor-o-Velho, in the Baixo Mondego river basin, has been an important agricultural and animal husbandry center. Rice, corn, cattle and horses are important productions in the area. Light industry, tourism, forestry, retail, services and local government are among other main economic activities. The municipality, which hosts dozens of bakeries, is famed for its rich tradition in conventual sweets manufacturing which includes the nationally renowned pastel de Tentúgal and the queijada de Pereira.

== Sports ==
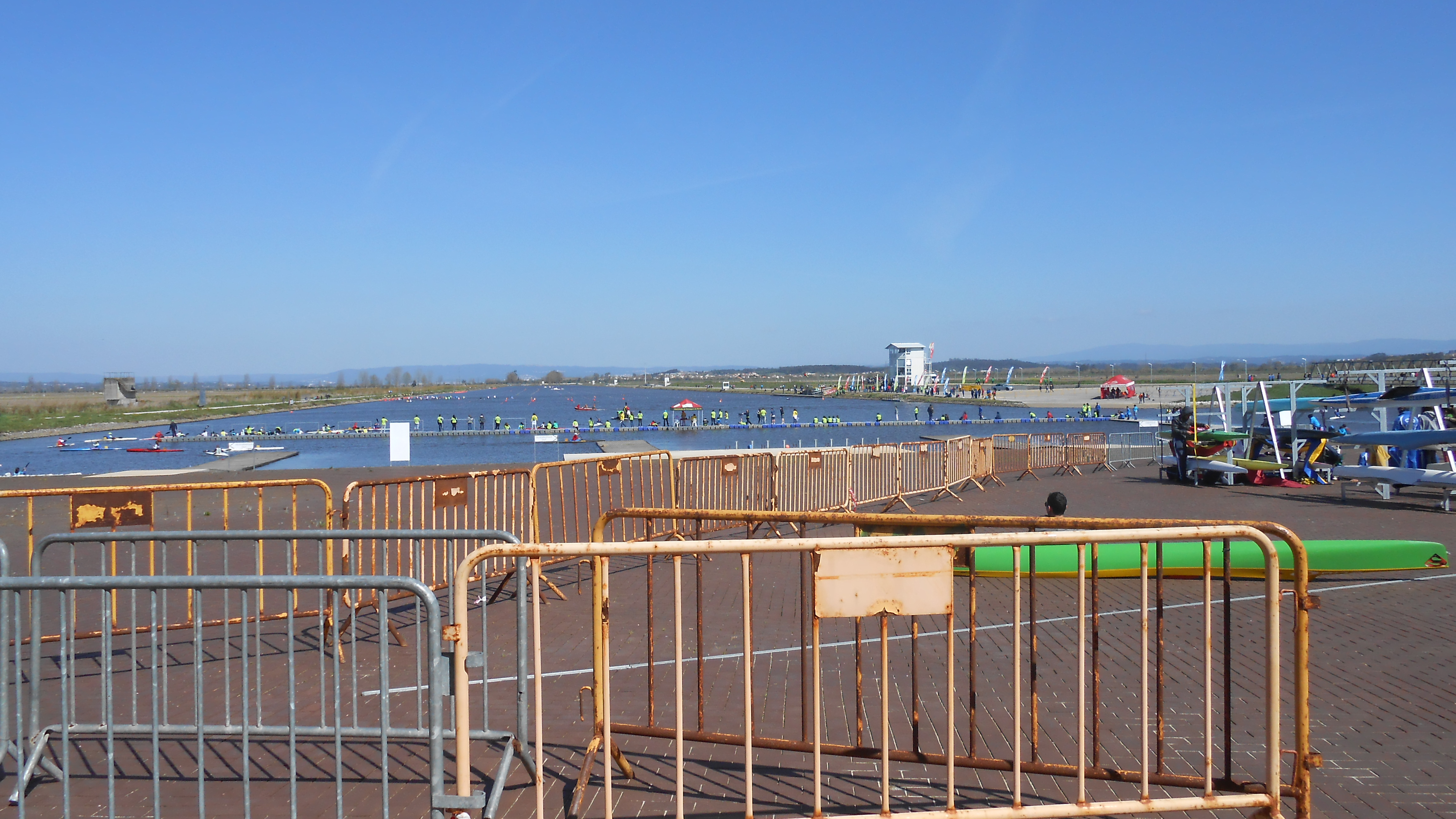
The sport rowing facility in Montemor-o-Velho.

Montemor-o-Velho has one of the only international sized 2 km rowing lakes in Portugal. The lake hosted its first rowing race in 2002 (the Coupe de la Jeunesse), before it was completed. During the competition, FISA judges noted that the lake was not wide enough to meet international standards. After then, it was rebuilt to meet these standards. It hosted the 2010 European Rowing Championships.

== Culture ==
Since 2014, the city hosts the Festival Forte that takes place inside Montemor-o-Velho Castle, in August, with the main focus on electronic music, visual and performing arts.

== Famous people ==
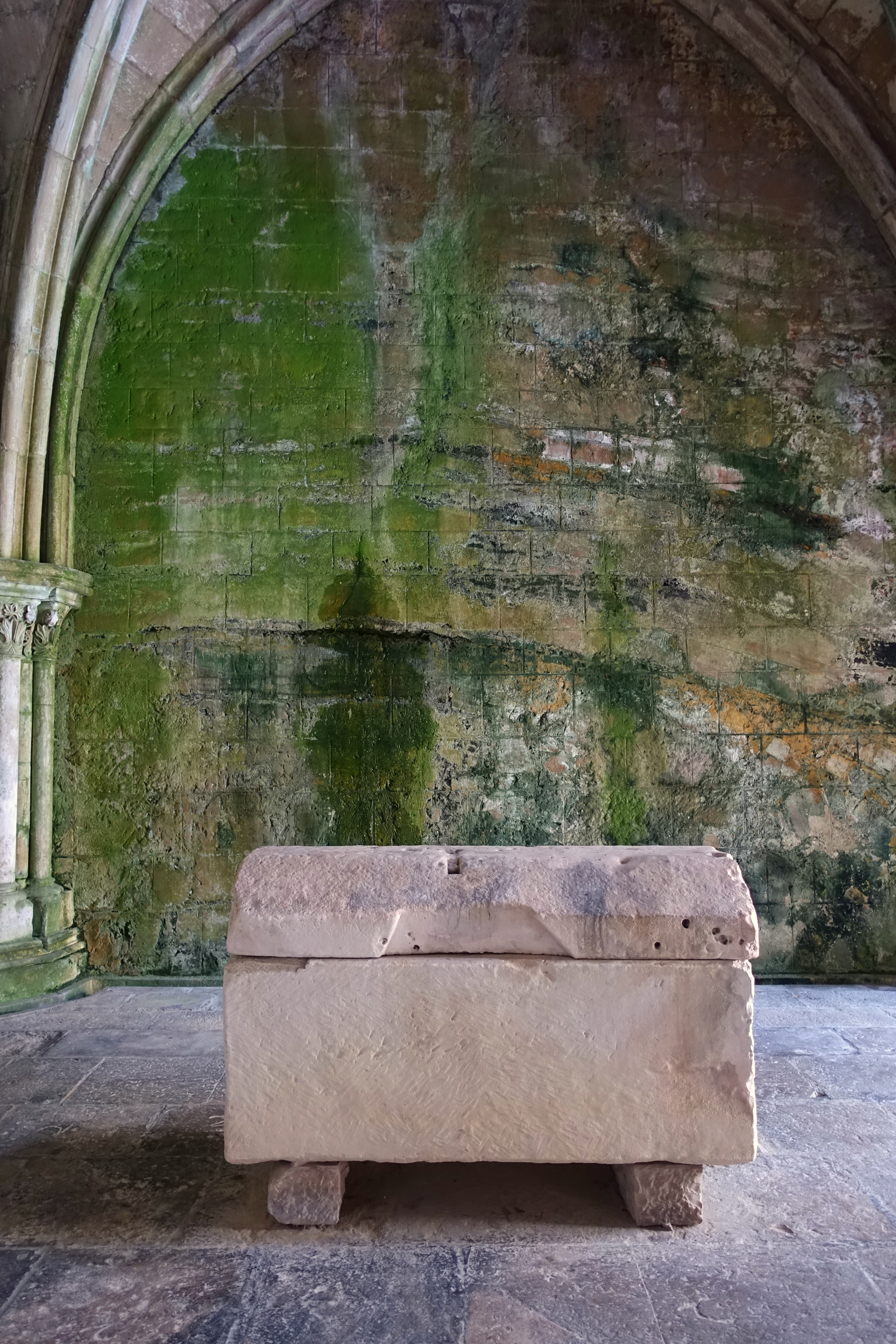
Sisnando Davides' tomb in Coimbra

=== Olden times ===
- Sesnando Davides (born in Tentúgal, died 1091) a Mozarab nobleman and military leader of the Reconquista, became governor of the County of Coimbra
- Diogo de Azambuja (1432–1518) a Portuguese noble and explorer.
- Vasco Gil Sodré (ca.1450—ca.1500) a navigator, one of the first settlers of Graciosa in the Azores
- Fernão Mendes Pinto (1509 – 1583), Portuguese explorer and writer
- Jorge de Montemor (ca.1520 – 1561) a Portuguese novelist and poet, who wrote the pastoral prose romance Diana in 1559.

=== Modern times ===
- Esther de Carvalho (1858–1884) a controversial actress and opera singer, also known in Brazil
- Manuel Jardim (1884–1923) a Portuguese painter and art teacher.
- Lurdes Breda (born 1970) a Portuguese poet and children's writer.
