= Mondego =

Mondego may refer to:

- Mondego River, Portugal
- Rio Mondego, another name for the Miranda River (Brazil)
- Baixo Mondego, a subregion of Portugal
- Cabo Mondego, natural monument in Portugal
- Metro Mondego, light rail network in Coimbra, Portugal
- Fernand Mondego, a villain in the novel The Count of Monte Cristo by Alexandre Dumas

== See also ==
- Baixo Mondego Subregion, Portugal
- Montego (disambiguation)
