= João Carlos Senna-Martínez =

Portuguese archaeologist

- Born: 1948; Lisbon, Portugal
- Died: 20 March 2022 (aged 73–74); Lisbon, Portugal
- Occupation: Archaeologist
- Known for: Research into Chalcolithic and late Bronze Age sites in Portugal and Iron Age sites in Mozambique

João Carlos de Freitas Senna-Martínez (1948–2022) was a Portuguese archaeologist and university professor who began his career in Portuguese Mozambique before moving to Portugal. He conducted extensive research of archaeological sites in the two countries.

== Early life ==
Senna-Martínez was born in the Portuguese capital of Lisbon in 1948. His family later moved to Mozambique when it was still a Portuguese colony. He completed his secondary education there and then entered the Universidade de Lourenço Marques in Maputo (since 1976 known as the Eduardo Mondlane University) to study history, where he completed a three-year teaching degree in 1975. Subsequently, he worked as a teaching assistant at the African Studies Centre of the university. By this time, he was already carrying out archaeological research, particularly with regard to the Iron Age, and publishing the results. His interest in African prehistory would stay with him throughout his career.

Returning to Portugal in 1977, he enrolled in the Faculty of Arts at the University of Lisbon, where he completed a Master's degree in 1979. He was also a teaching assistant in the History Department. After graduating, he was admitted as an assistant professor, then the foundation of an academic career. He spent his entire career at the Faculty of Arts, earning a PhD in 1990. For much of the time he was part of the Centre for Archaeology (UNIARQ).

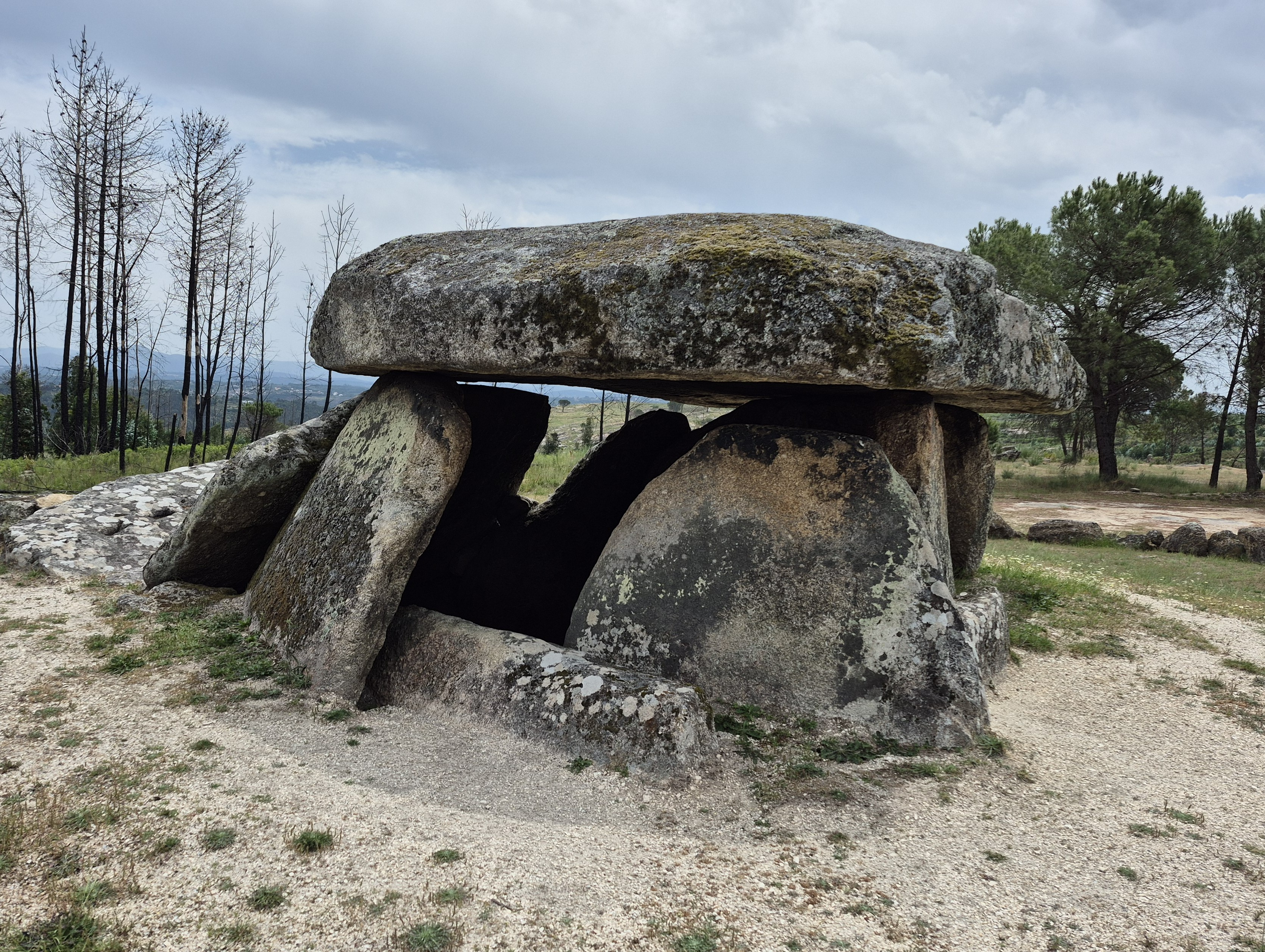
The Dólmen da Orca, one of the sites investigated by Senna-Martínez

== Career ==
Throughout his career Senna-Martínez was a professor of archaeology and prehistory, lecturing on the late prehistory of the Iberian Peninsula and archaeological heritage, as well as keeping in touch with the discipline of African studies by lecturing on African archaeology. He taught at undergraduate, master's, and doctoral levels, incorporating his students into both his excavation and laboratory work. After retirement, he continued to work with students from the university during his excavations and during his laboratory investigations.

Senna-Martínez began his research in Portugal by studying megaliths in the centre of the country, continuing the excavations begun by his PhD advisor, João de Castro Nunes. Over time, his focus broadened to include the lower Mondego River basin. With a particular interest in metallurgy and jewellery during the Chalcolithic and late Bronze Age periods, he actively employed scientific techniques in his research. Throughout his career, he promoted collaboration with local organizations in the locations in which he worked. He was also involved in national associations, such as the archaeology section of the Lisbon Geographic Society and the Friends of the National Museum of Archaeology, Lisbon. He published or edited numerous books, book chapters, and academic articles.

In 2001, he served as Distinguished Scholar in Residence at the University of Louisville in Kentucky, US. In his later career, freed from undergraduate teaching duties, while continuing to teach advanced degree courses, he spent more time on his research projects, conducting fieldwork in the central and northern inland areas of Portugal, such as Macedo de Cavaleiros in the Bragança District and Nelas in the Viseu District. He also devoted time to the study of artifacts from Portugal's former colonies.

== Death ==
Senna-Martínez died in Lisbon on 20 March 2022. He was buried in Lisbon's Benfica cemetery.
