= Dólmen da Orca =

Prehistoric dolmen in Viseu District, Portugal

- Lapa da Orca; Orca de Fiais da Telha
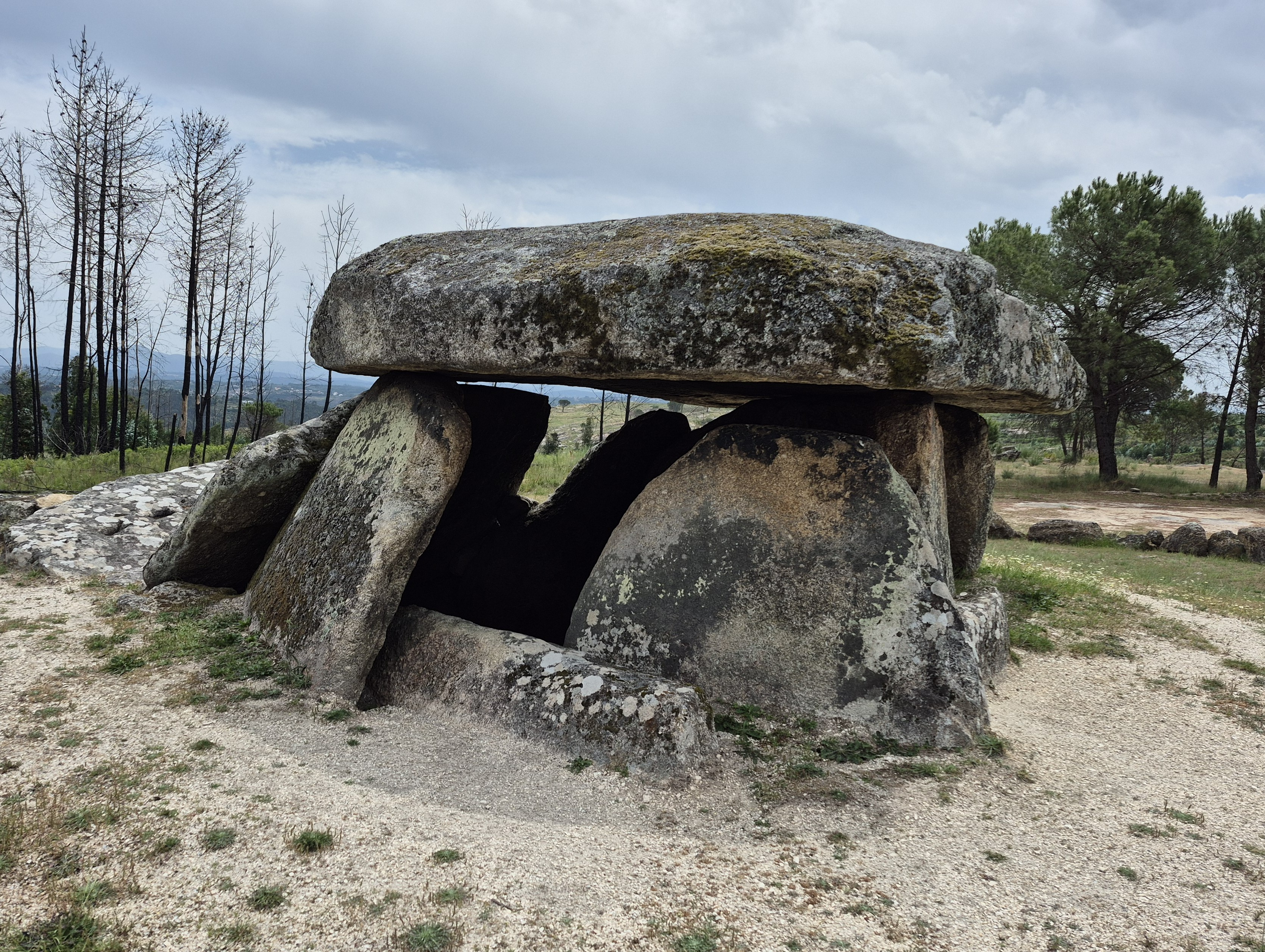
- Interactive map of Dólmen da Orca
- 40°26′37.8″N 7°56′17″W
- Type: Dolmen
- Periods: Late Neolithic
- Location: Carregal do Sal, Viseu District, Portugal
- Part of: Ameal-Azenha Megalithic Nucleus

Site notes
- Material: Granite
- Height: 3 m (9.8 ft)
- Length: 10 m (33 ft)
- Excavation dates: 1980s
- Condition: Good.
- Public access: Yes

The Dólmen da Orca (also known as the Lapa da Orca or the Orca de Fiais da Telha) is a Late-Neolithic megalithic dolmen located in the Viseu District of northern Portugal. It is one of the best-preserved tombs of this type in the area, having a polygonal chamber and corridor in situ. It was originally covered by a mound or tumulus, which has since disappeared.

== Location ==
The dolmen is located in the village of Fiais da Telha, in the parish of Oliveira do Conde, in the municipality of Carregal do Sal, in the Viseu district. It is situated at an altitude of 313 meters on the Ameal Plateau, a sub-region of the broader Mondego Plateau. The Mondego River is to the south and the Ribeira de Azenha (Ribeira Stream) to the northwest.

The location appears to have been particularly conducive to human settlement, as evidenced by the several similar dolmens on the same plateau, of which the Dólmen da Orca is the best example, and by the archaeological finds that have been made. It is probable that the area offered diverse and numerous hunting resources.

== Description ==
The Dólmen da Orca was constructed in the Late-Neolithic period. The polygonal, 3-meter-high burial chamber was built with nine granite orthostats, or upright stones, which had fallen but were repositioned during the archaeological investigations. They are covered by a single capstone. There are holes in some of the orthostats by the entrance to the chamber, which have been interpreted as possible fittings for doors, similar to those seen in sites in Malta. The chamber is approached by a 7.5-meter corridor, with 15 upright stones and the original covering stones remaining. The original tumulus would have had a diameter of almost 20 meters.

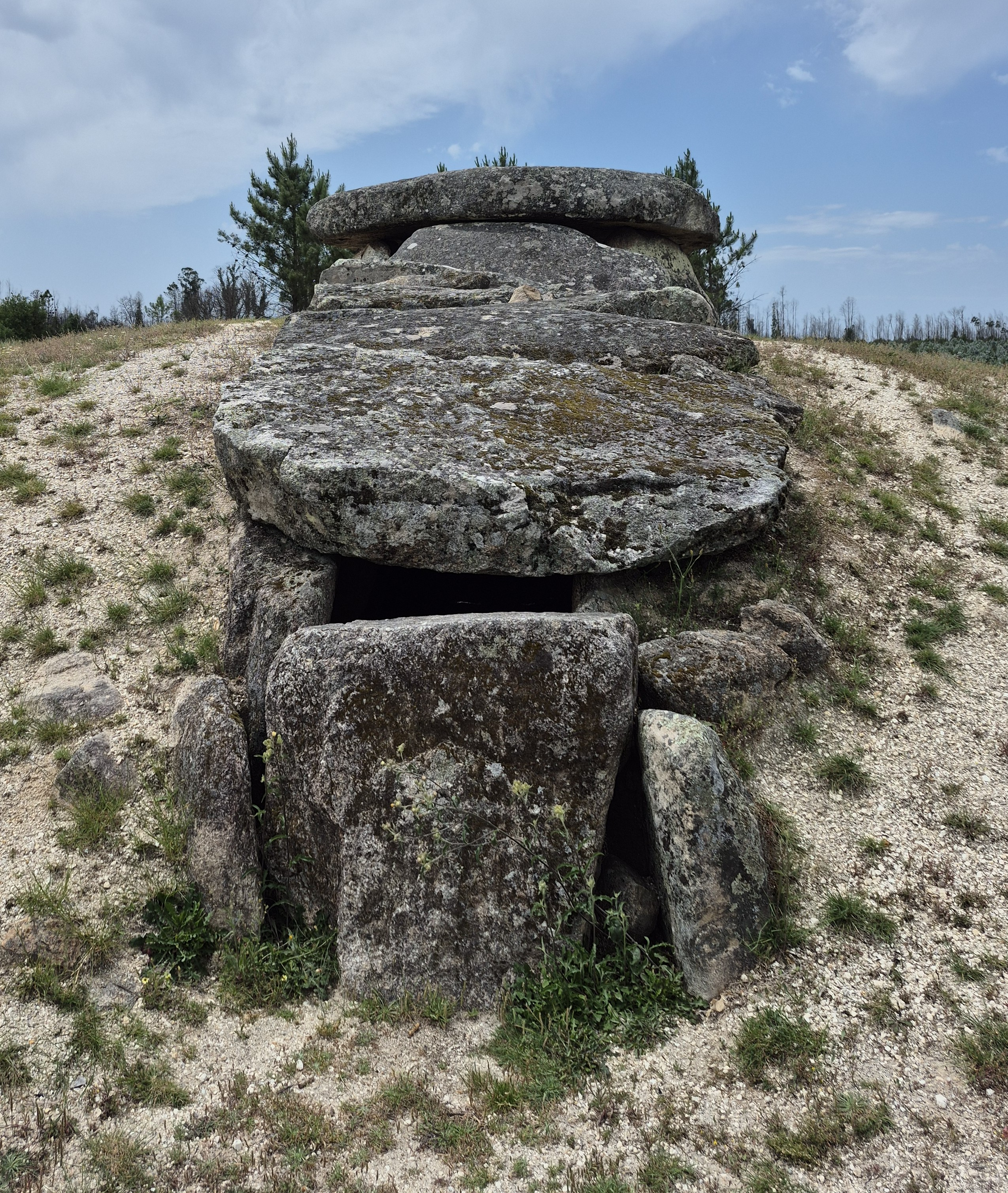
Corridor of the Dólmen da Orca

== Excavations ==
The dolmen was first excavated by the archaeologists, Maximiano Apolinário and José Leite de Vasconcelos (1858–1941), resulting in the discovery of an arrow head. Later, the megalithic monuments of the plateau were revisited by Irisalva Moita (1924–2009) but, as with Leite de Vasconcelos, the work was not carried out in any systematic way. The first detailed studies were conducted by João Carlos Senna-Martínez and José Manuel Quintã Ventura in the 1980s and 1990s within the scope of the "Archaeological Studies Programme of the Middle and Upper Mondego Basin”. The work they began continued into the 21st century. While the research initially concentrated on the Dólmen da Orca, it soon led to the identification of several other dolmens on the plateau, as well as other archaeological sites, including shelterss, with the area taking on the name of the Ameal-Azenha Megalithic Nucleus.

Researchers have developed the hypothesis that the area was used during the winter by communities that occupied the highlands of the nearby Serra da Estrela during the spring and summer. There is evidence of deforestation by fire without full regeneration of the forest, suggesting that the land was used for animal grazing. There seems to have been little crop cultivation, as the soils are largely unsuitable for this. In addition to animals from grazing and hunting, food sources seem to have included acorns from oak trees. The flowering of oaks corresponded to the time when people went to the mountains, with their return coinciding with the completion of the acorn formation.

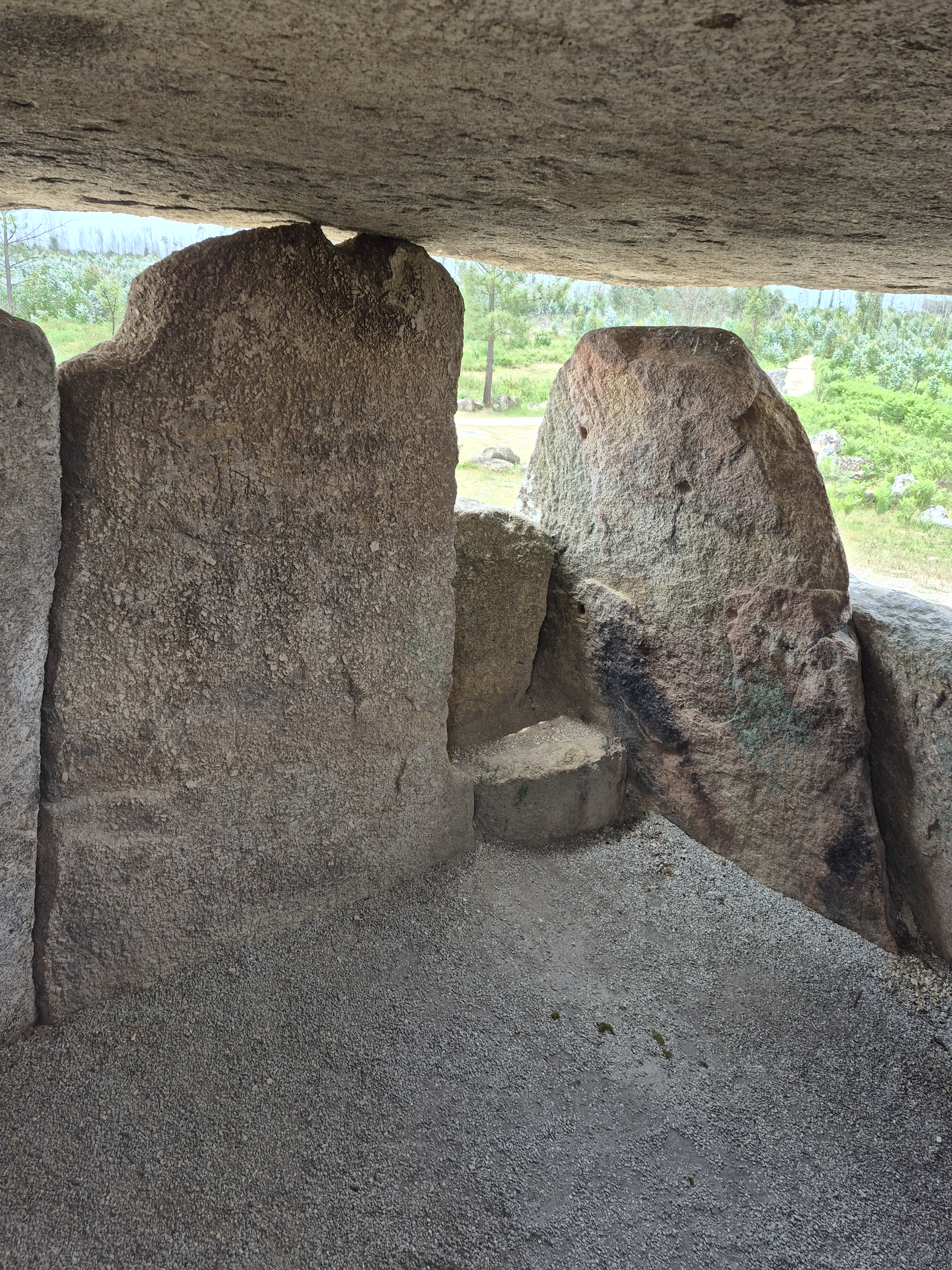
Interior view of the Dólmen da Orca

== Categorization ==
The Dólmen da Orca was categorized as a National Monument in 1974.

== Access ==
The dolmen is part of the Fiais/Azenha Prehistoric Circuit, which connects several megalithic sites in the area with well-maintained dirt roads. Besides the Dólmen da Orca, this circuit includes Orca 1 do Ameal, Orca 2 do Ameal, Orca da Palheira, Orca do Outeiro do Rato, Orquinha da Víbora, Orca do Santo, and the Abrigo da Orca, as well as other smaller structures and some traces of rock paintings.
