= Festival Forte =

Annual electronic music festival held in Portugal

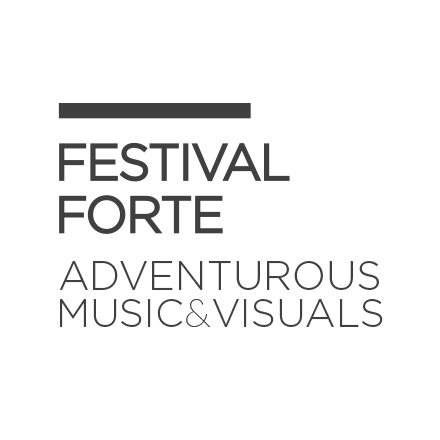
- Genre: Electronic, Techno, Experimental
- Dates: Last weekend of August
- Locations: Montemor-o-Velho Castle, Portugal
- Years active: 2014-present
- Founders: Ilidio Chaves
- Capacity: 5000
- Organizer: Soniculture
- Website: www.festivalforte.com

Festival Forte is an annual festival that takes place inside the Montemor-o-Velho Castle in Portugal, during the month of August, with the main focus on electronic music, visual and performing arts.

== Overview ==
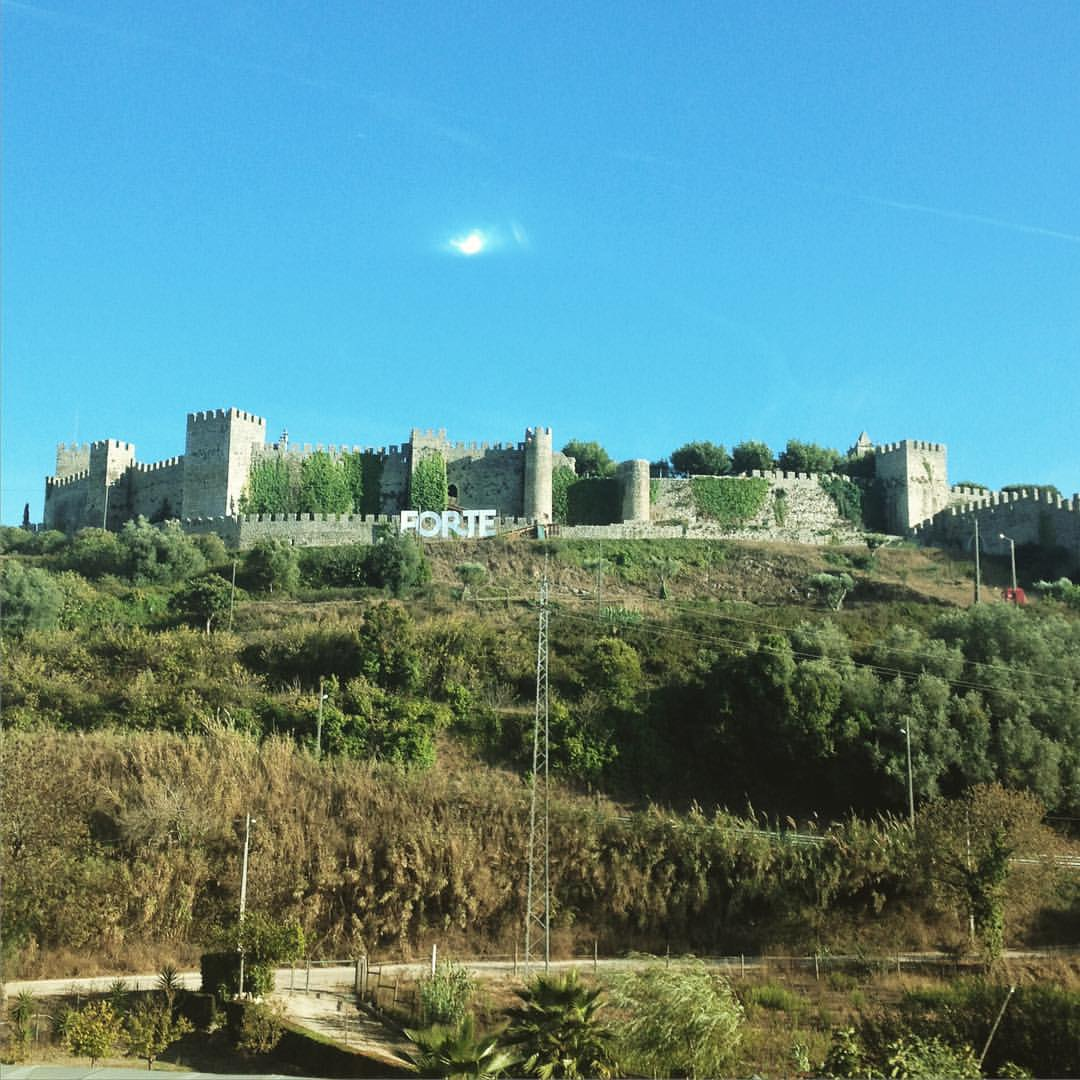
View of Montemor-O-Velho Castle where Festival Forte takes place.

Festival Forte takes place at Montemor-o-Velho Castle, a National Heritage site, and a cultural landmark in Portugal. It has been listed by 6AM as one of The World’s Most Unique Festival Locations.

The first editions of Festival Forte, used Video Mapping techniques to enhance the physical characteristics (historical and architectural) of the castle being nominated by Resident Advisor as one of the Top 10 Festivals of August 2015.

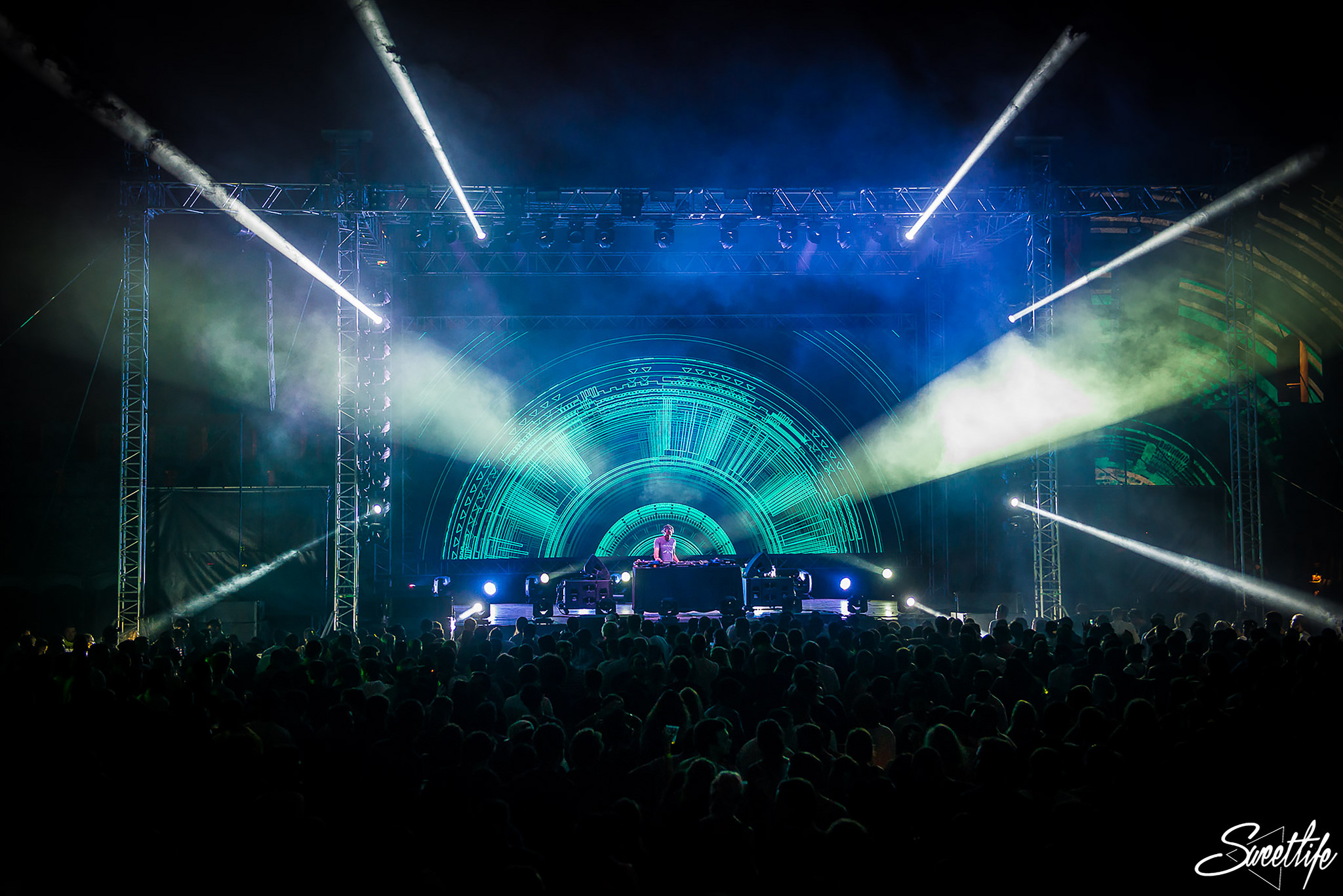
Festival Forte's stage and visual content

The stage design allows transparency to make the framing within the walls of the castle that receives large screens for the support of the visual spectacle. The rest of the space is also used as an audiovisual installation; such is the case of the Church of Sta. Maria de Alcáçova. About the stage's visuals, Crack magazine stated that the festival was "displaying consistently engaging, otherworldly visuals across its walls".

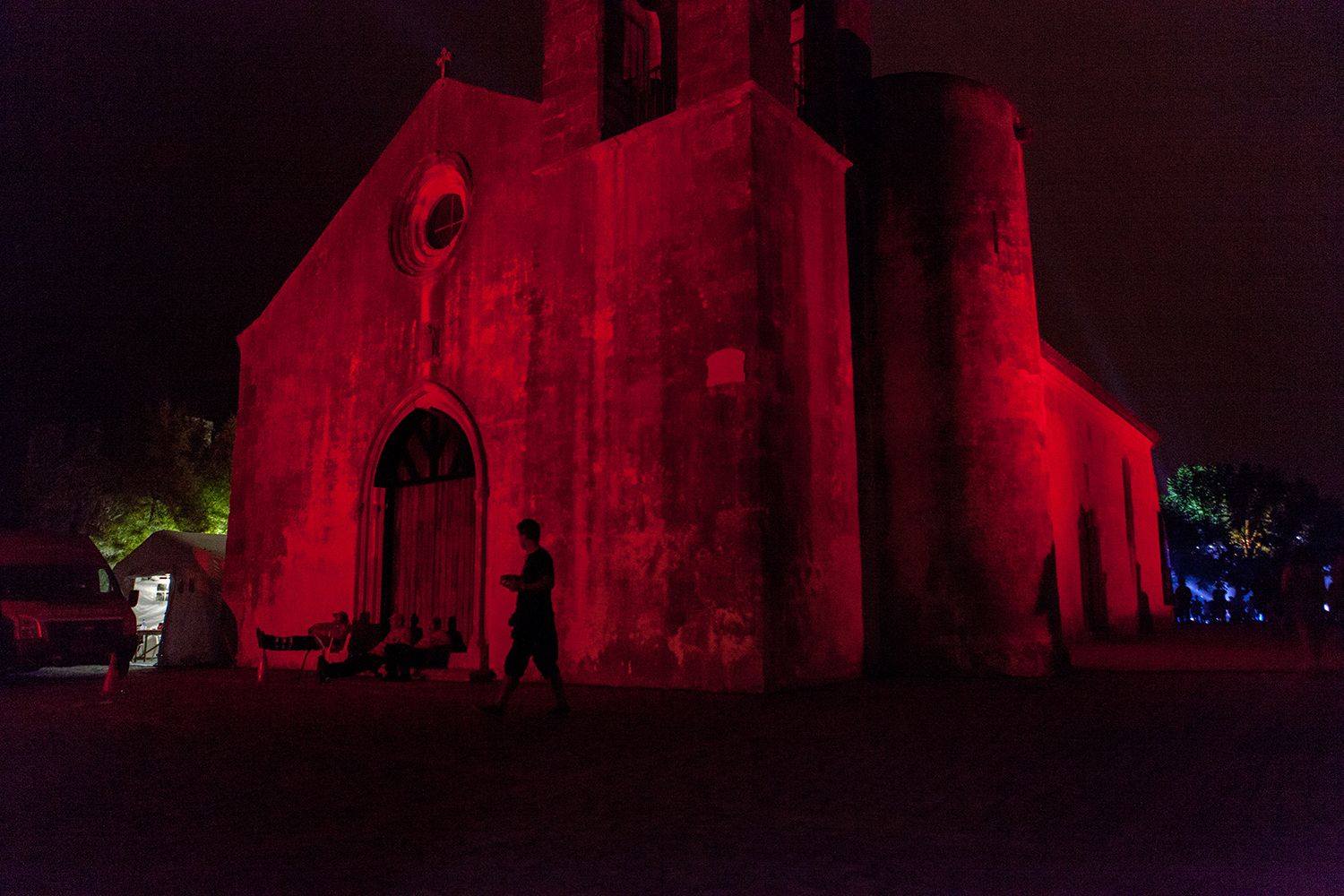
Video projections on Santa Maria de Alcacova Church during Festival Forte

The festival is getting recognition from international press such as The Quietus, The Skinny, Trax Magazine and Pitchfork Media which has listed Festival Forte 2016 on the Pitchfork Guide to Festivals.

Festival Forte 2019 has been announced on its official website and will take please from August 22 to 25, 2019.

== Educational approach ==
In April 2015, in partnership with the Faculty of Fine Arts of the University of Porto, the festival promoted the lecture “Laser Technology in Building an Audiovisual Performance” presented by Robert Henke, composer, performer and researcher with work oriented in the field of technical innovation in contemporary electronic music. In the context of the Lumière II laser show, performed outdoors for the first time at Festival Forte, Henke presented the most contemporary issues of the relationship between musical composition, audiovisual installations and computer applications. He addressed the complexity of the conceptualization of an audiovisual performance show built with use of laser technology activated and synchronized by sound stimuli.

Glitch and Generative Art are also objects of study and extensively used in the festival's conceptualization.

In April 2017 Festival Forte, together with the Department of Design and Multimedia of the University of Coimbra, organized a lecture about Generative Art with Jaygo Bloom, teacher at the Winchester School of Art. In 2018, Malo Lacroix from the Visuaal art collective presented his views at the same university, regarding the visual breakthrough planned for that year's edition of the festival.

== Performances ==
Year	Artists
2014	Ben Klock, David Rodrigues, DVS1, Elekfantz, Expander & Thinkfreak, Gaiser, João Maria, Kinetic, Manu, Michael Mayer, Miguel Soares & Pedro Pimenta, Minilogue vs Mathew Jonson, Oscar Mulero, Rødhåd, Rui Trintaeum, Rui Vargas, Sven Väth, Twofold
2015	Acronym, Adam X, Adriana Lopez, Afonso Macedo, Amulador, Apart, Ben Klock, Developer, Donato Dozzy, Duodub, Ellen Allien, Expander, Extrawelt, Front 242, Function, Gaiser, Headless Horseman, Manu, Marc Houle, Marcel Dettmann, Marcel Fengler, NX1, Paul Kalkbrenner, Planetary Assault Systems (aka Luke Slater), Regis, Robert Henke, Rui Vargas, Subjected, Vatican Shadow, XNX.
2016	Amulador, Ancient Methods, Apart, Apparat, Ben Klock, Cabaret Voltaire, Daniel Miller, David Rodrigues, Drumcell, Helena Hauff, Kobosil, Konstantin, Manu, Marcel Dettmann, Michael Mayer, Orphx, Rødhåd, Rrose, Sebastian Mullaert & Ulf Eriksson, Silent Servant, Shcuro, Trade, Truncate, Vil, Vril.
2017	Adriana Lopez, Amulador, Apart, Becka Diamond, Blawan, Byetone, Clark, Danny Daze, Dasha Rush, David Rodrigues, DVS1, Ellen Allien, Ex Continent, In Aeternum Vale feat. Anneq, Jeff Mills, Jonathan Uliel Saldanha, Kangding Ray, Lucy, Lussuria, Manu, Michael Mayer, Nathan Fake, Ninos du Brasil, Oscar Mulero, Peder Mannerfelt, Phase Fatale, Ron Morelli, Shifted, Shlomo, T.Raumschmiere, Techno Widow, Varg, Vatican Shadow.
2018	Anastasia Kristensen, Adam X, Alva Noto, Antigone x François X, Blush Response, Caroline Lethô, Donato Dozzy, Drew McDowall + Florence To "Time Machines 2018" live a/v world premiere, Electric Indigo, Enkō, Extrawelt, Function, Hedonic 2, Helena Hauff, I Hate Models, Lena Willikens, Local Suicide, Marum, Monolake (live) Surround, Mumdance, Neel, Oscar Mulero, Pantha du Prince feat. Bendik Hk, Planetary Assault Systems, Robert Lippok, Rotten Sun, Shlømo, Stanislav Tolkachev, Surgeon, Svreca, The Hacker, Umwelt.
