= Castle of Avô =

Portuguese medieval castle

- Castelo de Avô
- Coimbra, Pinhal Interior Norte, Centro in Portugal
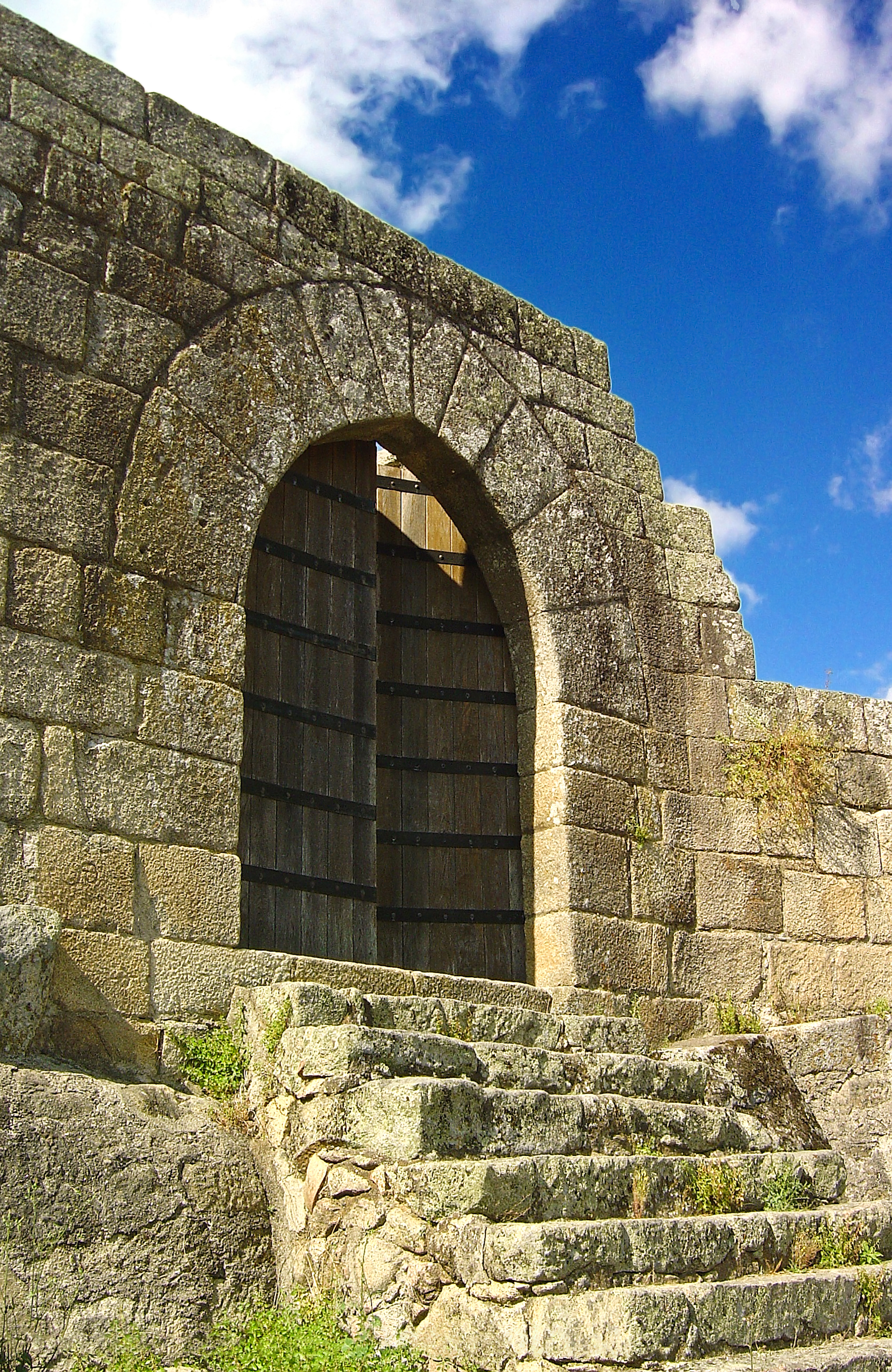
- Ruins of the Castle of Avô

Site information
- Type: Castle
- Owner: Portuguese Republic
- Operator: DRCCentro (Ordinance 829/2009; Diário da República, Série 2, 163, 24 August 2009)
- Open to the public: Public

Location
- Coordinates: 40°17′36″N 7°54′16″W

The Castle of Avô (Portuguese: Castelo de Avô) is a medieval castle located in the civil parish of Avô, municipality of Oliveira do Hospital, in the Portuguese district of Coimbra.

== History ==
Sometime during the Iron Age the territory of Avô was occupied by a primitive Castro culture, that was much later taken-over by the Romans. The site was an important link in the Roman road network, connecting Lancia Oppidana and Conímbriga.

In 412, the settlement was settled by the Alans. It was taken in 716 by Muslim forces.

In the 11th century, the settlement was part of the possessions of the Count of Coimbra, Sesnando Davides.

D. Henrique donated Avô to the Bishop of Coimbra in the 12th century. It was likely his son, D. Afonso Henriques who ordered to construction of the first medieval fortress over the ruins of the Roman settlement. By 1187, the town pertained to D. Urraca Afonso, illegitimate daughter of Afonso Henriques, who traded it for Aveiro, from her brother D. Sancho I. It was King Sancho who conceded the foral (charter), confirming it in the hands of the Bishop of Coimbra.

In the 13th century, the castle was destroyed during battles between D. Sancho II and Afonso III.

A century later, it was reconstructed by King D. Dinis (from the vestiges uncovered on the site).

From 1856, the castle ruins began to deteriorate rapidly, with much of the stone reused in public works, including the construction of the bridge crossing the Ribeira de Moura. The keep tower was ultimately disassembled.

On 1 June 1992, the property was placed in the hands of the Instituto Português do Património Arquitetónico (Portuguese Institute of Architectural Patrimony), by decree 106F/92 (Diário da República, Série 1A, 126).

The first attempts to stabilize and recuperate the existing walls began in 1942, and persisted off-and-on to 1963. In 1966, repairs began on the wall alongside the chapel and repairs its pavement and walls, which continued in the chapel, the following year.

In 1972, survey of the primitive soil, reconstruction of the pavement, chapel altar and the windows.

== Architecture ==
The castle is located in an isolated, urban area, at the top of a hill that dominates the settlement on the margin of the Alva River, at the confluence with the Moura River and river beach. By a branch 9 kilometres (5.6 mi) from the Estrada da Beira, it is situated in the extreme south part of the settlement, over the barrio/neighbourhood of Couraça, in flanks of the hilltop, accessible by pedestrian train.

The curtain walls, with polygonal merlons, encircle the ogive arch of the main gate, 3.5 metres (11 ft) high by 2.7 metres (8.9 ft) wide. Near the gate is the single-nave Chapel of São Miguel (Chapel of the Archangel Michael), with presbytery and vaulted ceiling with two lateral niches.
