= Pastel de Tentúgal =

Portuguese pastry

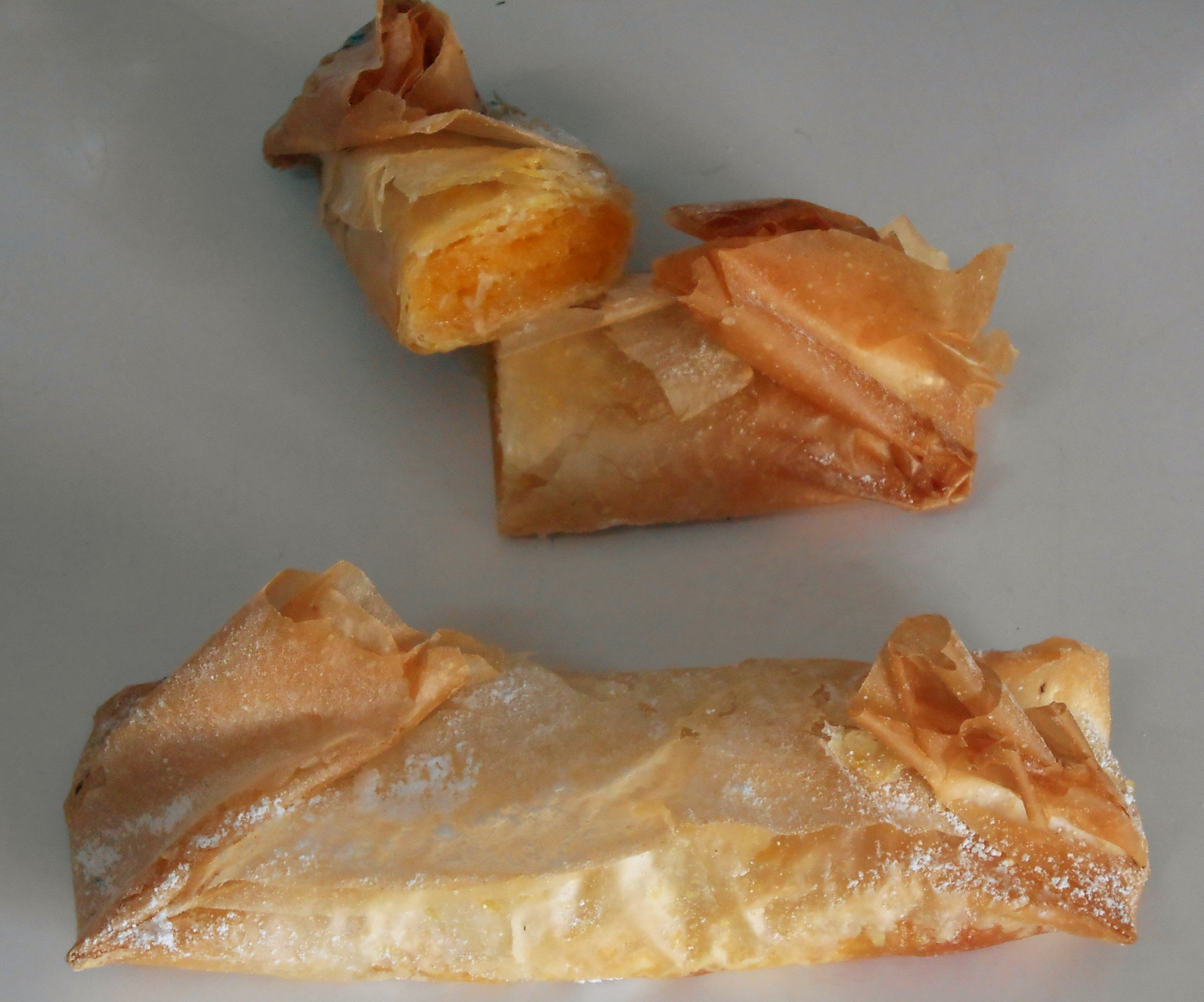
Tentúgal pastry

Pastel de Tentúgal (Tentúgal pastry) is a Portuguese pastry originating in Tentúgal, in the municipality of Montemor-o-Velho. This conventual sweet was first created sometime in the 16th century by Carmelite nuns at the Convento de Nossa Senhora do Carmo. It is made of a sweet ovos moles filling consisting of egg yolks and sugar, wrapped in a paper-thin dough.
