= Tentúgal =

- Civil parish
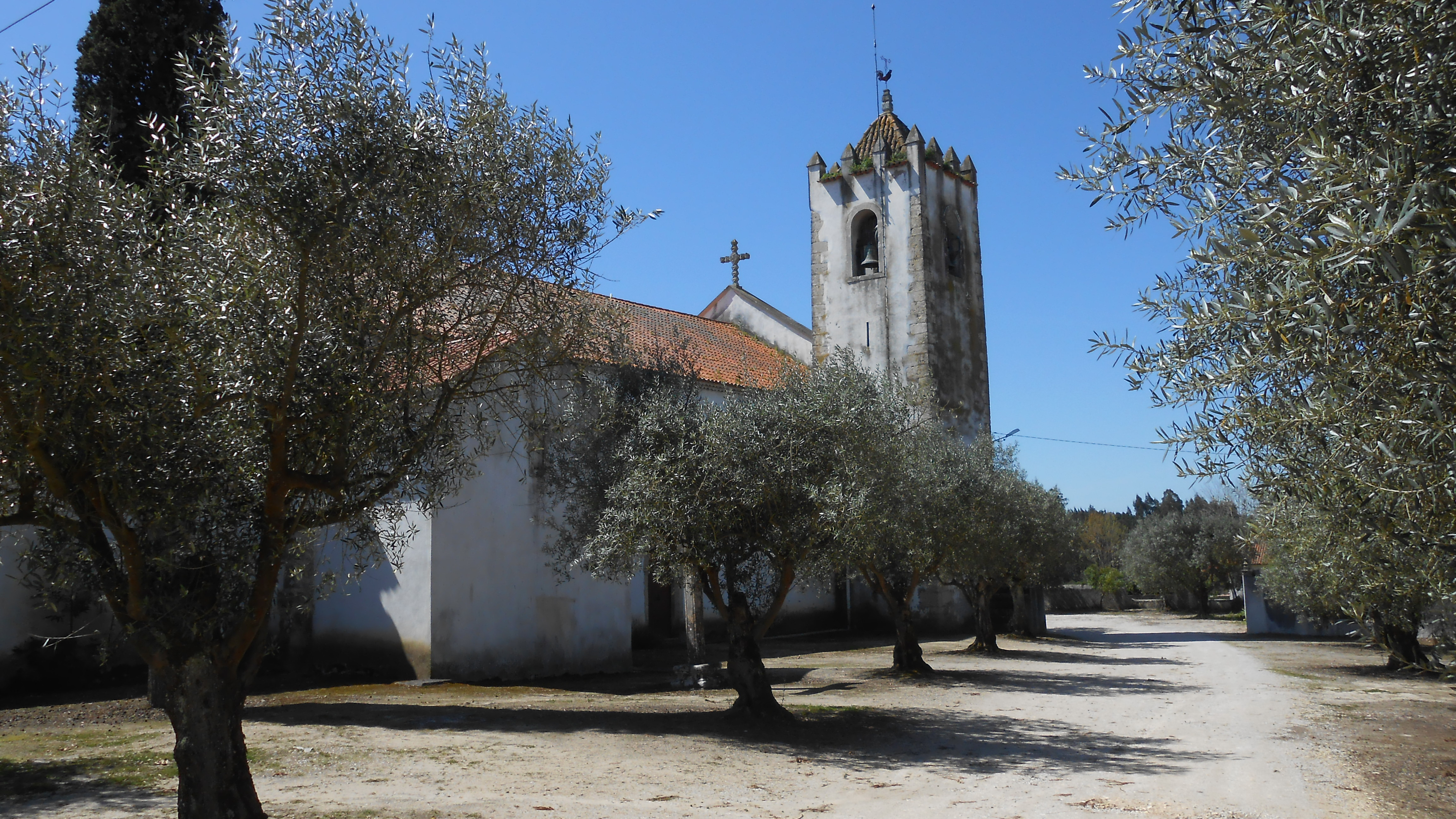

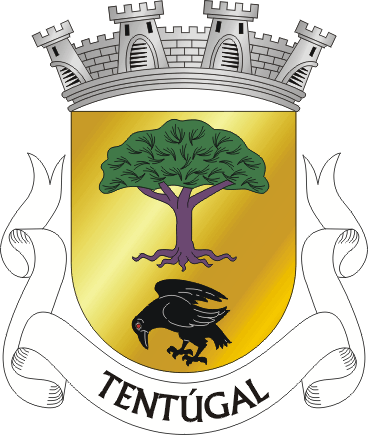
- Coat of arms

- Location in Portugal
- Coordinates: 40.224°N 8.584°W
- Country: Portugal
- Region: Centro
- Intermunic. comm.: Região de Coimbra
- District: Coimbra
- Municipality: Montemor-o-Velho

Area
  - Total: 34.29 km^{2} (13.24 sq mi)

Population (2011)
  - Total: 2,141
  - Density: 62.44/km^{2} (161.7/sq mi)
- Time zone: UTC+00:00 (WET)
  - Summer (DST): UTC+01:00 (WEST)

Tentúgal is a parish of Montemor-o-Velho Municipality, Coimbra District, Portugal. The population in 2011 was 2,141, in an area of 34.29 km². The village is well known in Portugal for its old and unique conventual cakes, most notably the pastel de Tentúgal. Sisnando Davides, Count of Coimbra, was born in Tentúgal in the 11th century.

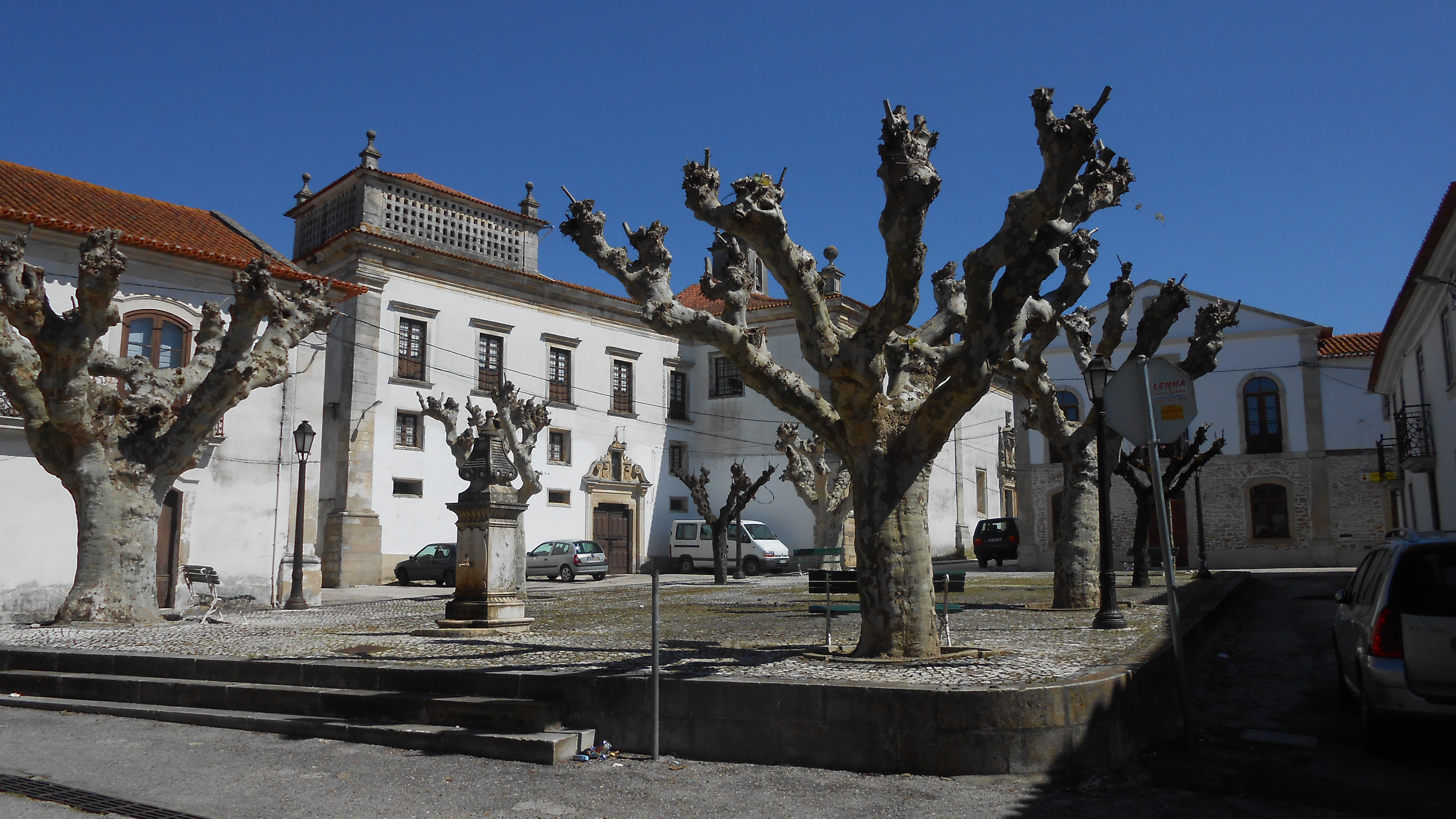

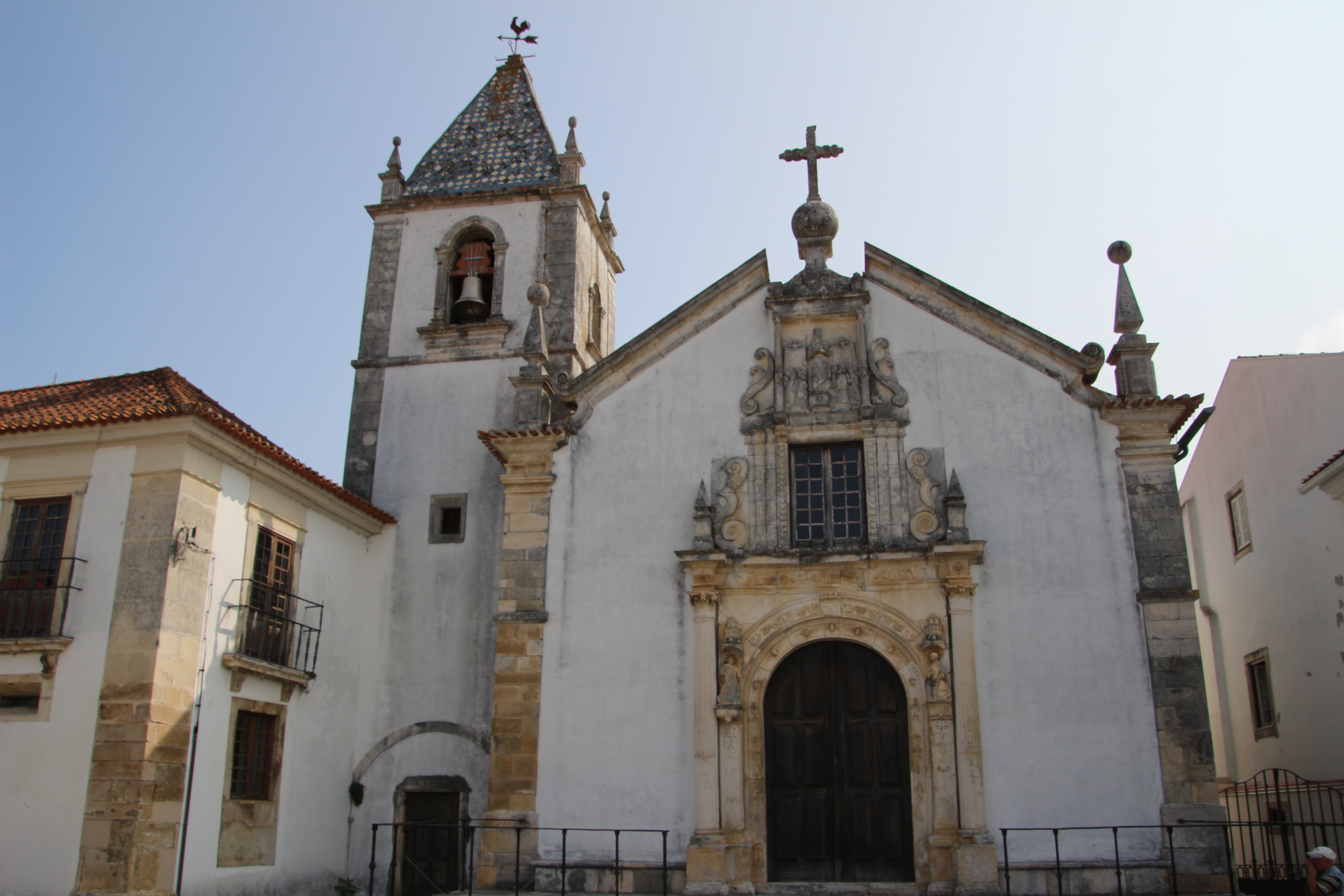

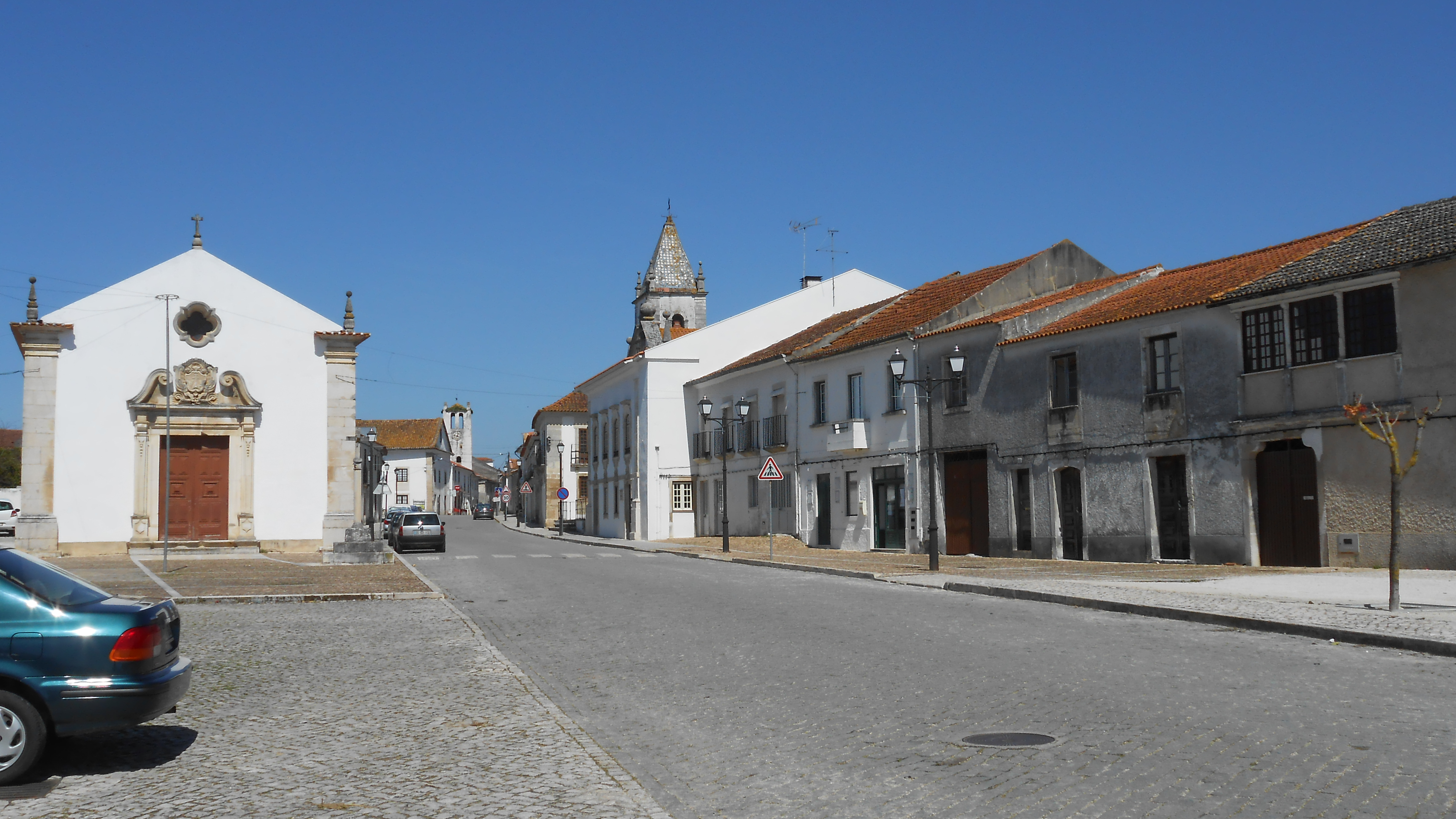
