= Montego =

Montego may refer to:

== Places ==
- Montego Bay, Saint James, Jamaica, a city and the capital of Saint James

== Automobiles ==
- Austin Montego, a 1984–1995 large family car, also sold by MG, Rover, and Sipani
- Mercury Montego, a 1968–1976, 2004–2007 American full-size car

== People ==
- Montego Glover (born 1974), American stage actress and singer
- Montego Joe (1929–2010), American jazz percussionist and drummer

== See also ==
- Mondego (disambiguation)
- Montego Bay (disambiguation)
