= Ceira River =

River in northern Portugal

Coordinates: 40°10′59″N 008°23′49″W

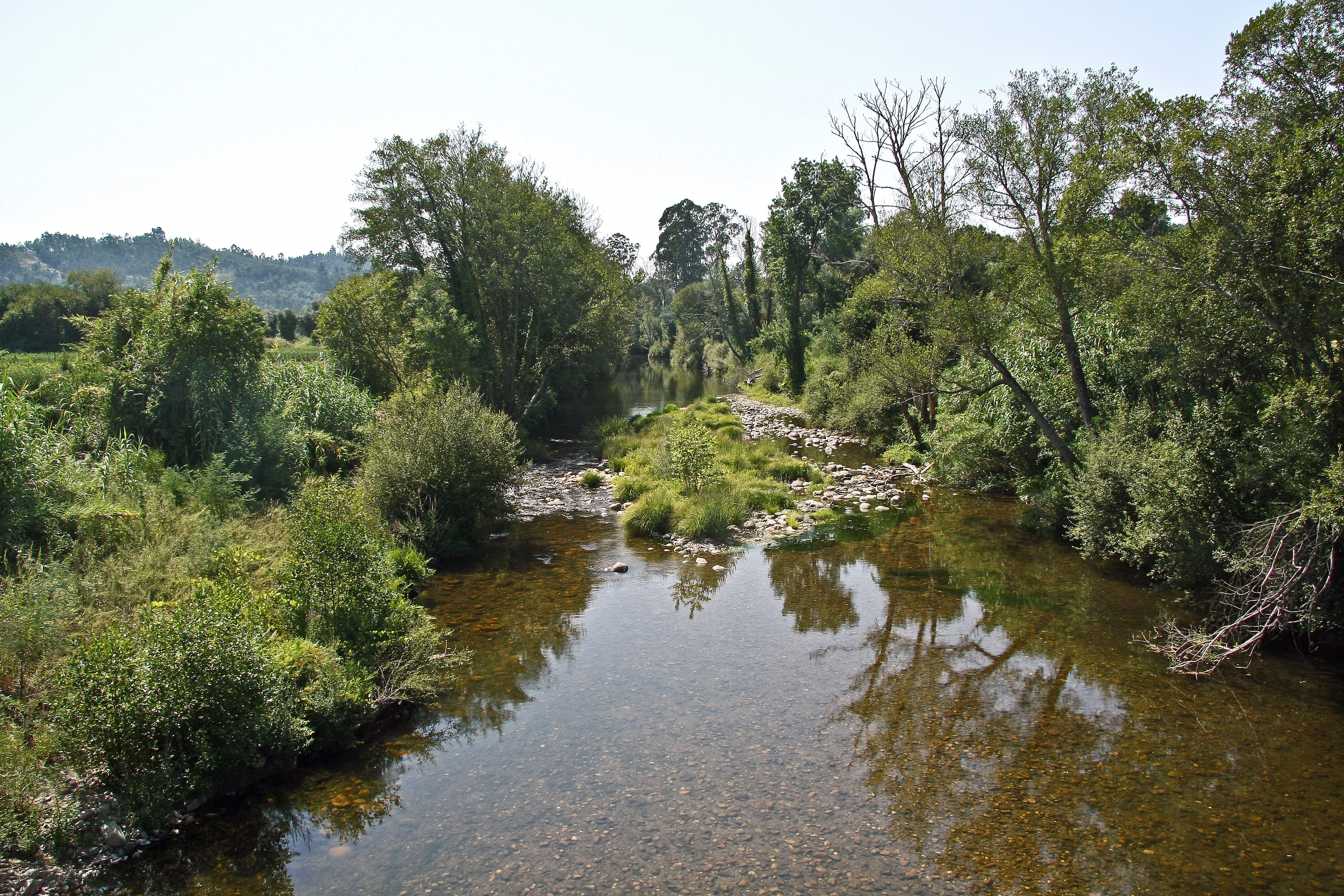
Ceira river in Portugal

The Ceira River (Portuguese pronunciation: [ˈsɐjɾɐ]) is a river in central Portugal arising out of the Serra do Açor. It is a lefthand tributary of the Mondego River, which it enters from the south, just upstream of the city of Coimbra.

== Course ==
The Ceira arises in the Covilhã Municipality and flows basically southwest through Pampilhosa da Serra Municipality until it enters Góis Municipality and flows west past its villages of Soito, Colmeal, Sobral, Candosa, Capelo, Sandinha, and Cabreira to Cortecega where it turns north past the villages of Carcavelos, Góis, Nogueiro, Várzea Pequena, and Vila Nova do Ceira. At Juncal, Góis Municipality, where it is joined from the left (south) by the Rio Sótão, the river again turns southwest towards Serpins after which it heads west past Casal de Ermio. Shortly after Casal de Ermio, the river heads northwest past the village of Foz de Arouce, where it is joined from the left (southwest) by the Rio Arouce.

The river continues northwest past the villages of Alçaperna and Pomar dos Braços, and just before the village of S. Frutuoso it turns west for about 8 kilometres (5 mi), flowing past S. Frutuoso, Tapada, and the village of Ceira to where the Rio Corvo (Rio Dueça) joins it from the left (south). The Ceira River then flows north for about 2 kilometres (1.2 mi) to enter the Mondego River. National Highway 17 runs along the right bank of the river starting just west of Alçaperna and continuing all the way to the Mondego River, which it bridges into the town of Coimbra. The entire length of the Ceira is about 100 kilometres (62 mi).

== Features ==
At the upper end of the Ceira River is the 36-metre (118 ft) high Alto Ceira Dam, which draws on a 38-square-kilometre (9,400-acre) watershed. In addition the reservoir is fed by water from the Castanheira Dam on the Arganil, via a 3,257-metre (10,686 ft) tunnel through the mountain.

== Tributaries ==
- Rio Sótão
- Rio Arouce
- Rio Corvo, also known as the Rio Dueça
