= Esther de Carvalho =

Controversial Portuguese stage actor who died in Brazil at a young age

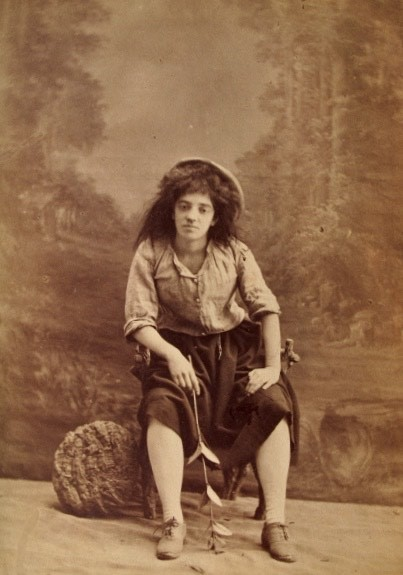
- Born: Esther Amélia da Costa Coutinho da Silva Carvalho; 20 August 1858; Montemor-o-Velho, Portugal
- Died: 15 January 1884 Aged 25; Rio de Janeiro, Brazil
- Resting place: São João Baptista Cemetery, Botafogo, Rio de Janeiro
- Occupation: Actor
- Years active: 5
- Known for: Lisbon and Rio de Janeiro theatre

Esther de Carvalho (1858 – 1884) was a controversial Portuguese actress and opera singer who also became well-known in Brazil, where she died a young death.

== Early life ==
Esther Amélia da Costa Coutinho da Silva Carvalho was born on 20 August 1858 in Montemor-o-Velho in the Coimbra District of Portugal. Her father was a trained lawyer who also acted in amateur dramatics. She was educated in nearby Figueira da Foz, where she became a singer and pianist, performing at local clubs. She briefly considered being a teacher but was too easy-going for such a task and was also attracted by the applause she received for her performances. At the age of 21 she decided to leave home and go to the Portuguese capital of Lisbon, with the intention of becoming an actor.

== Early career ==
Carvalho was immediately hired in Lisbon by the Teatro da Trindade and her debut took place on 31 March 1880 in an operetta called O Cão de Malaquias. Her performance was a huge success. The newspaper reviews were similarly positive, as they were for the operettas that followed while she was at the Trindade. However, despite her success with the public, criticisms were made about the way she behaved as a professional. The impresario, Francisco Palha, director of the Trindade theatre company, fined her numerous times and criticised her often. She avoided rehearsals, missed shows and insulted her colleagues. Her incompatibility with the Trindade company, and vice versa, got to the point that she decided to leave the country.

== Brazil ==
In July 1882 Carvalho left for Brazil, together with the actor known as Ribeiro. Taking advantage on her arrival of the presence in Rio de Janeiro of the Portuguese playwright, director and impresario, António de Sousa Bastos, she sent a note to his theatre saying, "My dear Sousa Bastos - Do you want me in your theatre? - Esther". From then she stayed at Sousa Bastos' house, and he gave her a role in his next play. She then sought to promote her shows, by doing what Sousa Bastos described as "indescribable", giving impromptu performances in the streets. This attracted a great following, rivalling that of Pepa Ruiz, generally considered the most popular actress in Rio de Janeiro at that time. The theatres of the city became disorderly as the shows in which Pepa Ruiz took part were interrupted by "Estheristas", and those in which Esther performed were interrupted by "Pepistas". The disagreements then moved from the theatres to the streets. This increasing violence convinced Sousa Bastos to move to São Paulo.

== Decline and death ==
Esther and the actor Ribeiro, joined the conductor Francisco Alvarenga, a friend of Sousa Bastos who came from Europe at his invitation, to became entrepreneurs of the Teatro Recreio Dramático in Rio de Janeiro. However, the riots between the "Estheristas" and the "Pepistas" continued, resulting in the murder of Alvarenga, who was beaten to death. A few days later, on 21 March 1883, Ribeiro died, a victim of yellow fever. The tragic deaths of her partners left Esther alone to direct the theatre, when she was only 24 years old and clearly incapable of so doing. Shortly afterwards, she developed tuberculosis and would die, penniless, on 15 January 1884. She was buried in the São João Baptista Cemetery in the Botafogo neighbourhood of Rio de Janeiro, her grave being next to that of Ribeiro.

Several recreational associations in Rio de Janeiro took on Carvalho's name. In her home town of Montemor-o-Velho the theatre was named after her. Her name was also given to a street in São Paulo.
