= Lurdes Breda =

Portuguese writer

- Born: May 5, 1970 (age 56); Montemor-o-Velho, Portugal
- Citizenship: Portugal
- Education: Open University
- Occupation: Writer
- Writing career
- Language: Portuguese
- Genres: books for children and young people
- Notable awards: "Women of Value" (2006), Municipal Cultural Merit Medal (2014)

Lurdes Breda (born May 5, 1970) is a Portuguese poet and children's writer.

She was born in the municipality of Montemor-o-Velho, Portugal. Breda attended the Modern Languages and Literatures course – Portuguese Studies variant, at the Open University. She was awarded in several national and international literary contests. Breda is the author of twenty-eight works and co-author of eleven others, published in Portugal, Brazil and Mozambique. She is known, above all, as a writer of books for children and young people.

== Awards and honours ==
In 2005, Lurdes was distinguished with the "Women of Value" Award and in 2014, she received the Municipal Cultural Merit Medal.

== Bibliography ==
=== Fiction ===
- "O Misterioso Falcão de Jalne" (Edition: Mar da Palavra, November 2004)

=== Poetry ===
- "Asas de Vento e Sal" (Edition: Mar da Palavra, March 2006)
- "A Outra Face do Luar" (Illustration by Ana Loureiro), (Edition: Mar da Palavra, December 2006)
- "Para Ti, Pai" (Illustration by André Caetano), (Edition: Gatafunho, March 2011)
- "Para Ti, Mãe" (Illustration by André Caetano), (Edition: Gatafunho, April 2011)
- "Lua em Flor" (Illustration by Ana Luísa Kaminski (cover) and André Caetano), (Edition: Vieira da Silva, August 2012)

=== Children and Youth ===
- "Zuleida, A Princesa Moura" (Illustration by Andreia Travassos), (Edition: Mar da Palavra, January, 2006)
- "O Abade João" (Illustration by André Caetano), (Edition: Minerva Coimbra, June 2009)
- "O Duende Barnabé e as Cores Mágicas" (Illustration by Joana Rita, Music by Nuno Mouronho and Lina Carregã), (Edition: Nova Educação, December 2009)
- "O Piolho Zarolho e o Arco-íris" (Illustration by Carla Figueiredo), (Edition: Temas Originais, March 2010)
- "O Alfabeto Trapalhão" (Illustration by Rute Reimão), (Edition: Gatafunho, October 2010)
- "O Rap do Mar e Outros Contos de Rimar" (Illustration by Aurélio Mesquita) (Edition: Lugar da Palavra, March 2011)
- "O Duende Barnabé e o Jogo Geométrico" (Illustration by Joana Rita, Music by Nuno Mouronho and Lina Carregã), (Edition: Nova Educação, May 2006)
- "O Relógio que tem a Barriga a dar Horas" (Illustration by Manuela Câmara), (Edition: Edições Esgotadas, January 2012)
- "O Livro Sem Letras" (Illustration by Inês Pereira), (Edition: Chiado Books, December 2012)
- "À Roda do Coração" (Illustration by Cátia Vidinhas), (Edition: Paleta de Letras, December 2013)
- "O Menino Quatro-Olhos e o Pássaro Azul" (Illustration by Mafalda Barata), (Edition: Lugar da Palavra, November 2014)
- "Afonso" (Illustration by Marta Jacinto) (Edition: Author, October 2016)
- "A Avó que sonhava o mar" (Illustration by Joana Rita), (Edition: Textiverso, May 2017)
- "A Nuvem que chovia Peixes" (Illustration and design by Manuela Rocha), (Edition: Textiverso, June 2017)
- "Bichofonias – Contos com bichos dentro" (Illustration by Marta Jacinto, pedagogical review by Joana Rama), (Edition: Textiverso, July 2017)
- "Onde moram as estrelas / Donde viven las estrellas" (Illustration by Alejandra Giordano (Alita)), (Edition: Hora de Ler, May 2019)
- "A Árvore Mágica" (Illustration by Roberto Chichorro), (Edition: Escola Portuguesa de Moçambique – Centro de Ensino e Língua Portuguesa (EPM-CELP), May 2019)
- "O Gafanhoto Saltarico" (Illustration by Carla Monteiro), (Edition: Hora de Ler, November 2019)
- "100 Papas na Língua" (Illustration by Tânia Clímaco), (Edition: Escola Portuguesa de Moçambique – Centro de Ensino e Língua Portuguesa (EPM-CELP) e Camões – Centro Cultural de Maputo, May 2020)
- "Henriqueta e o Bruxedo da Lua" (Illustration by Manuela Rocha), (Edition: Hora de Ler, July 2020)
