= Castle of Montemor-o-Velho =

Castle in Montemor-o-Velho, Portugal

Coordinates: 40.176°N 8.683°W

Castelo de Montemor-o-Velho
- Montemor-o-Velho, Portugal
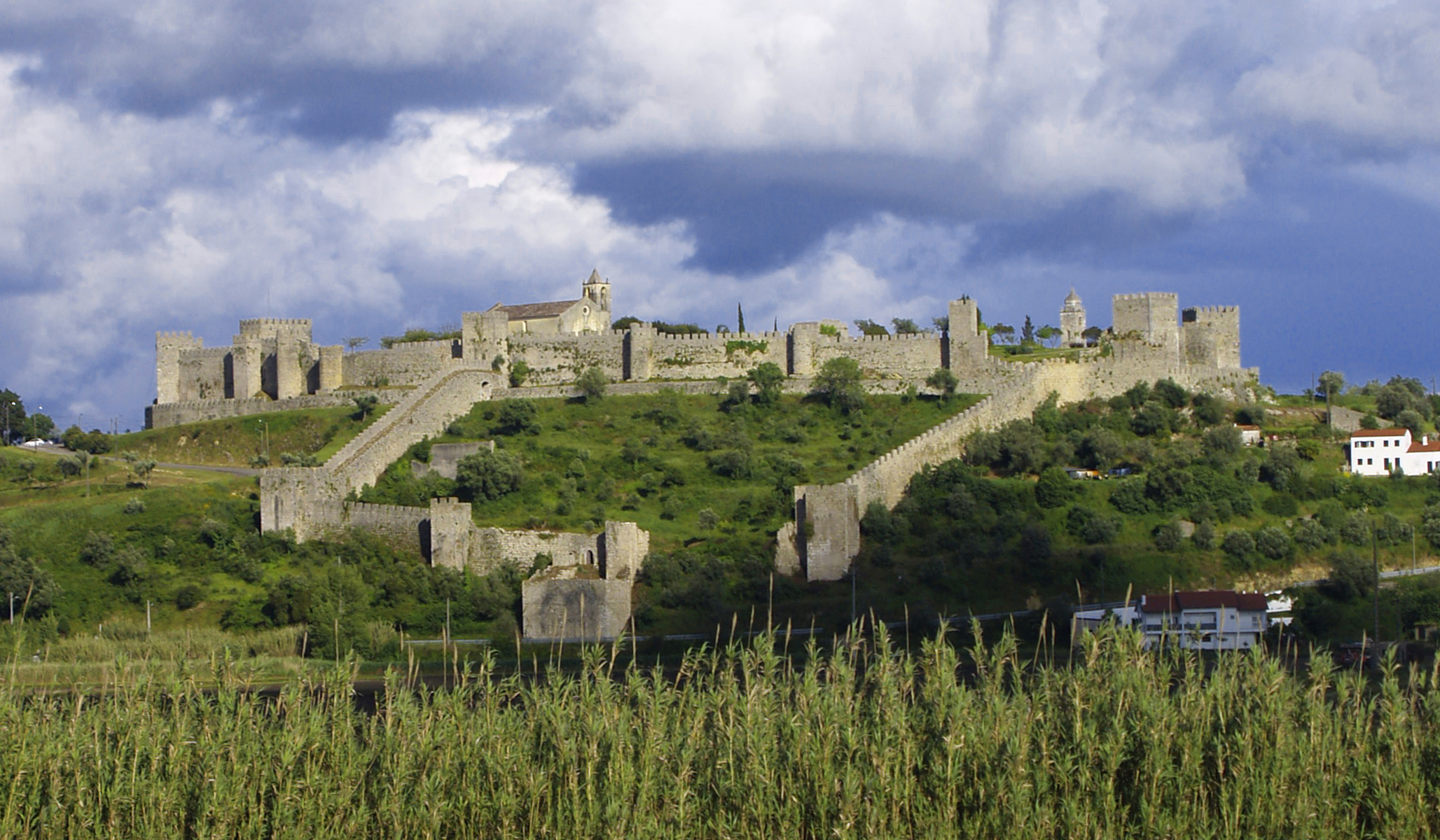

Site information
- Type: Medieval fortress
- Owner: Portuguese Republic
- Condition: Intact

Site history
- Built: 1088–1520
- Built by: Alfonso VI of León and Castile

The Castle of Montemor-o-Velho (Portuguese: Castelo de Montemor-o-Velho) is a Portuguese castle in the civil parish of Montemor-o-Velho e Gatões, municipality of Montemor-o-Velho, district of Coimbra.

It has been listed as a national monument since 1910. It is older than Portugal's nationality (1139).

Since 2014, the castle hosts the Festival Forte which is an electronic music festival set in August.

== See also ==
- Siege of Coimbra (1117)
