= Montego Bay (disambiguation) =

Montego Bay is a city in Saint James, Jamaica.

Montego Bay may also refer to:

== Places ==
=== In Montego Bay ===
- Montego Bay High School, an all-girls high school
- Montego Bay railway station, a former railway station
- Montego Bay Sports Complex, a multi-purpose sports stadium

=== United States ===
- Montego Bay Resort, a hotel and casino in West Wendover, Nevada

== Other uses ==
- "Montego Bay" (song), a 1970 song by Bobby Bloom

== See also ==
- "Montego Bae", a 2018 hip hop song by Noname featuring Ravyn Lenae
- Montego (disambiguation)
