= Oscar Mulero =

Spanish DJ and producer

- Also known as: Dr Smoke, Trolley Route, Infamous Monster, Double Sided Hospital, OM, O. Mulero, Mulero
- Born: Óscar Mulero Crecente; June 25, 1970 (age 56); Spain
- Origin: Madrid, Spain
- Genres: Techno, ambient
- Occupations: DJ, Producer, Label Owner
- Years active: Ending 1980´s–present
- Labels: PoleGroup, Warm Up Recordings
- Member of: K.O.M.S., El Joven Prisionero, Quite Unusual, Second Skin, Selección Natural, Spherical Coordinates
- Website: oscarmulero.com

Oscar Mulero, born Óscar Mulero Crecente, is a techno producer and DJ from Madrid, and the owner of contemporary record labels PoleGroup Recordings and Warm Up Recordings. He has majorly influenced the Spanish electronic scene since the early 1990s and been a leading exponent of underground techno since his productions in the early 2000s. In the late 1980s, he started playing in Madrid clubs like New World and Overdrive, which were oriented to genres like EBM or techno. This is often considered the start of his professional career. In 1994, he also became the founder of The Omen Club in Madrid. He has runs his own record labels Warm Up Recordings since 2000 and PoleGroup Recordings aka Pole Recordings since 2004. Each label's catalog contains more than 100 releases. His 2012 album Black Propaganda received largely positive reviews in the online techno community.

== Discography ==
Albums

- Have You Ever Retired A Human By Mistake?, Warm Up Recordings, 2024
- The Beauty Of Leaving A Legacy, Semantica Records, 2019
- Perfect Peace, Semantica Records, 2018
- Biosfera, Detroit Underground, 2013
- Black Propaganda, Warm Up Recordings, 2012
- Grey Fades To Green, Warm Up Recordings, 2011

Singles & EPs

- The Stranger, Token, 2024
- Poisonality, PoleGroup Recordings, 2024
- Oscar Mulero / PWCCA, Asteroidal Dust, Inducted Waves, 2022
- Desde La Boca del León, PoleGroup Recordings, 2022
- Tormenta, PoleGroup Recordings, 2021
- Oscar Mulero / Umwelt, Rave Or Die 14, 2021
- Mannequin, Suburban Avenue, 2021
- Titan, Token, 2021
- Oscar Mulero / P.E.A.R.L., Blood In The Water, Falling Ethics, 2020
- Called Nature, Warm Up Recordings, 2020
- Gradual Blending, Warm Up Recordings, 2020
- Kessell, Head Dress, Oscar Mulero – 5 Years Of Granulart C/D Disc, Granulart Recordings, 2020
- Paradisaea, Hospital Productions, 2019
- Opposite, Warm Up Recordings, 2019
- Dualistic Concept, PoleGroup Recordings, 2018
- Acceptance, Semantica Records, 2018
- Electric Shades, Token, 2018
- Out Of Field, PoleGroup Recordings, 2018
- Contents "Pattern Series 4 Remixes" Part. II, Warm Up Recordings, 2017
- Contents "Pattern Series 4 Remixes" Part. I, Warm Up Recordings, 2017
- Arcade, Warm Up Recordings, 2016
- Elementary Geometry, Faut Section, 2016
- Spatial Sequence Synesthesia, Mord, 2016
- Hyperbolic Paths, Token, 2016
- Contents, Warm Up Recordings, 2016
- Pulse One, Kessell, Oscar Mulero, The Parallel, Deaxmade – SALESPACK incl. 005 / 003 / 002, Granulart Recordings, 2016
- Senses, Warm Up Recordings, 2015
- Electric Storm, PoleGroup Recordings, 2014
- Break Down Remixes, HueHelix, 2014
- Vertigo, Warm Up Recordings, 2014
- Accelerometer Operation Principle, Semantica Records, 2014
- Black Propaganda Reconstructed Part II, Warm Up Recordings, 2013
- Black Propaganda Reconstructed Part I, Warm Up Recordings, 2013
- Break Down, HueHelix, 2013
- Horses, PoleGroup, 2011
- Synchronous Rotation, PoleGroup, 2011
- Paul Boex / Oscar Mulero - Hate Is Love EP, Dynamic Reflection, 2010
- Exium / Oscar Mulero - 1996 / Nothing To Prove, Warm Up Recordings, 2010
- Asteroid Belt EP, Labyrinth, 2010
- Oscar Mulero: Svreca - As Thin As Christ, Semantica Records, 2009
- Seleccion Natural Parte 4, Warm Up Recordings, 2009
- Take Seven EP, Token, 2008
- Process And Reality, Warm Up Recordings, 2008
- Oscar Mulero / Christian* - Newrhythmic 7, New Rhythmic, 2008
- 46, Warm Up Recordings, 2007
- Implant EP, Warm Up Recordings, 2007
- Only Dead Fish Go With The Flow, Tresor, 2007
- The Damage Done, OM Digital, 2007
- Won't Tell You, OM Digital, 2007
- Exium & Oscar Mulero - Deadly Weapons, Nheoma, 2005
- Christian Wünsch / Oscar Mulero - El Silencio Habla / Fully Sanctioned, PoleGroup, 2005
- The Gothic Window Effect, Mental Disorder, 2005
- Pro-Files, Warm Up Recordings, 2004
- Oscar Mulero & Go Hiyama - Art & Strategy, Warm Up Recordings, 2004
- El Hombre Duplicado, Surface, 2004
- Down Force EP, Mainout, 2004
- Anaconda, The Remixes, Theory Recordings, 2004
- Primary Instincts, PoleGroup, 2004
- Oscar Mulero & Christian Wünsch - The Damage Done Part 2, Tsunami Records, 2004
- Christian Wünsch & Oscar Mulero - The Damage Done, PoleGroup, 2004
- The Nine, Warm Up Recordings, 2003
- Floodland EP, Warm Up Recordings, 2002
- Learning To Be A Machine, Warm Up Recordings , 2002
- In Bad Company, Theory Recordings, 2002
- Ben Sims / Oscar Mulero - Oblivion / Anaconda, Theory Recordings, 2002
- CV. Is Dead..., Warm Up Recordings, 2002
- Altered State EP, Coda Records, 2002
- Christian Wünsch / Oscar Mulero - Unexpected, Sheep Records, 2002
- Christian Wünsch / Oscar Mulero - Offshore, Tsunami Records, 2001
- Double Sided Hospital – Medical Mesh EP, Warm Up Recordings, 2000
- Bandulero, Kobayashi Recordings, 2000
- Sans Souci EP, Warm Up Recordings, 2000

as Trolley Route

- Vibrant Colours, Semantica Records, 2023
- Exercise Two, OM Digital, 2009
- A Occhi Chiusi, Pure Plastic, 2003
- Form Factor EP, Chaval Records, 2010
- World´s Waiting, Cray1 Labworks, 2008
- Trolley Route vs. Arcanoid – Zero / Detroit City, Minuendo Recordings, 2007
- A Occhi Chiusi(Remixes), Pure Plastic, 2003
