= Baixo Mondego =

Coordinates: 40°13′12″N 8°25′48″W

Map showing the location of the Baixo Mondego subregion

Baixo Mondego (Portuguese pronunciation: [ˈbajʃu mõˈdeɣu]; Lower Mondego in English) is a former Portuguese NUTS3 subregion that comprised the lower part of the Mondego River. It was abolished at the January 2015 NUTS 3 revision. It was a subregion of the Centro Region, centered on the historical city of Coimbra. With an area of 2,062 km² and a population of 336,376 inhabitants (of which half are in the cities of Coimbra and Figueira da Foz), the Baixo Mondego was a subregion with a mean density of 163/km². The subregion was named after the Mondego River and all this river area has been known as Baixo Mondego (Lower Mondego) since ancient times, even before the creation of the NUTS3.

== Economy ==
Economically, the subregion is dominated by the presence of the city of Coimbra, that plays the role of capital and chief city of Portugal's Centro Region. Coimbra has a notable university, major hospitals, wide range of services, important technological-based companies, and diverse cultural attractions. There is also a strong industrial presence around the port city of Figueira da Foz that comprises a busy seaport, fishing harbour and summer tourism facilities. Along the shores of the Mondego River, there is important agriculture activity. The city of Cantanhede is the heart of an important wine region and an agriculture centre, and is a modern bioscience hub through the Biocantpark, a science park. The subregion is place for important forestry, fishing and livestock raising activities, and produces sizeable quantities of rice, corn, wine, olive oil, fruits and vegetables. Biosciences, engineering, pulp and paper, ceramics, information technologies and food, are the main industries.

== Municipalities ==
The subregion comprises eight municipalities (municípios):

- Cantanhede
- Coimbra
- Condeixa-a-Nova
- Figueira da Foz
- Mealhada municipality
- Mira
- Montemor-o-Velho
- Penacova
- Soure

The largest cities are Coimbra (106,000), Figueira da Foz (28,000), Cantanhede (9,000) and Mealhada (5,000).
