= Alva River =

River in northern Portugal

Coordinates: 40°17′45″N 8°14′46″W

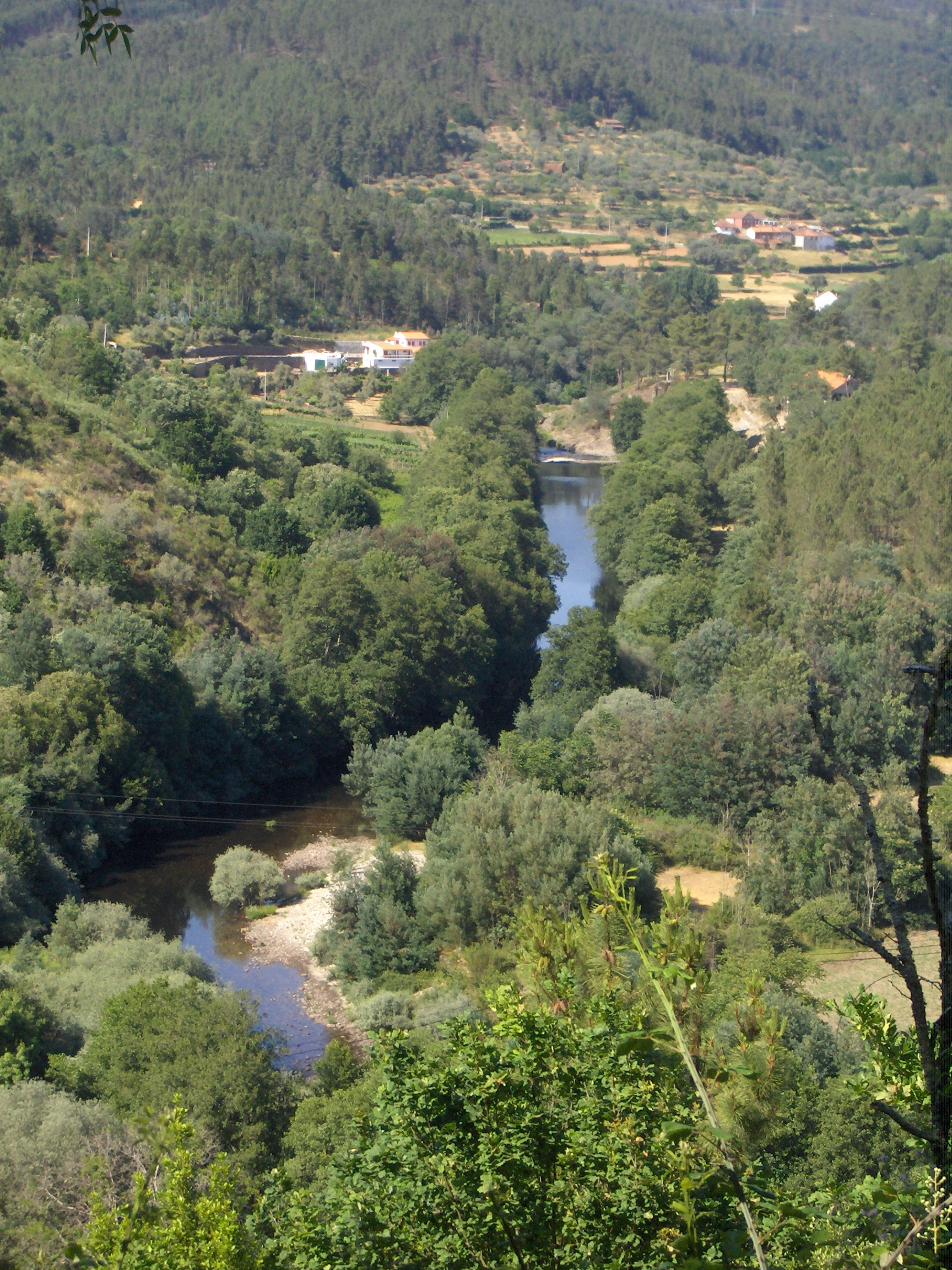

Alva River (Portuguese: Rio Alva, Portuguese pronunciation: [ˈalvɐ]) is a river in Portugal. It flows into the Mondego River.

The river Alva is a mountain river, a tributary of the Mondego, rising on the southwest slope of the Serra da Estrela and running about 110 kilometres (68 mi) until draining into the river Mondego, which occurs in the town of Porto de Raiva, parish of Oliveira do Mondego, Municipality of Penacova In the District of Coimbra after the Mondego is interrupted by the Aguieira Dam.

The bed follows a winding path between the slopes of the Serra da Estrela and the Serra do Açor, where it has dug its course. Several localities have grown along the banks of the river, as well as many river beaches such as those at Sandomil, São Gião, Caldas de São Paulo, São Sebastião da Feira, Avô, Côja, and Secarias, as the river approaches the Fronhas Dam.

The Alva River is crossed in São Martinho da Cortiça by the Fronhas Dam after having covered approximately 89 kilometres (55 mi). This dam had a maximum discharge of around 500 m^{3}/s.

It is a river known to have a very high variation in its flow, since it has a very low flow in the summer, and very high in the winter. This is mainly due to the variation of precipitation during the year, and the absence of this in the summer, but also to the fact that the flow of the river is controlled to a great extent by the water system, and snow falling in the Serra da Estrela.
