= Mondego River =

River in northern Portugal

Coordinates: 40°12′47.41″N 8°20′41.25″W

Mondego River Mondego
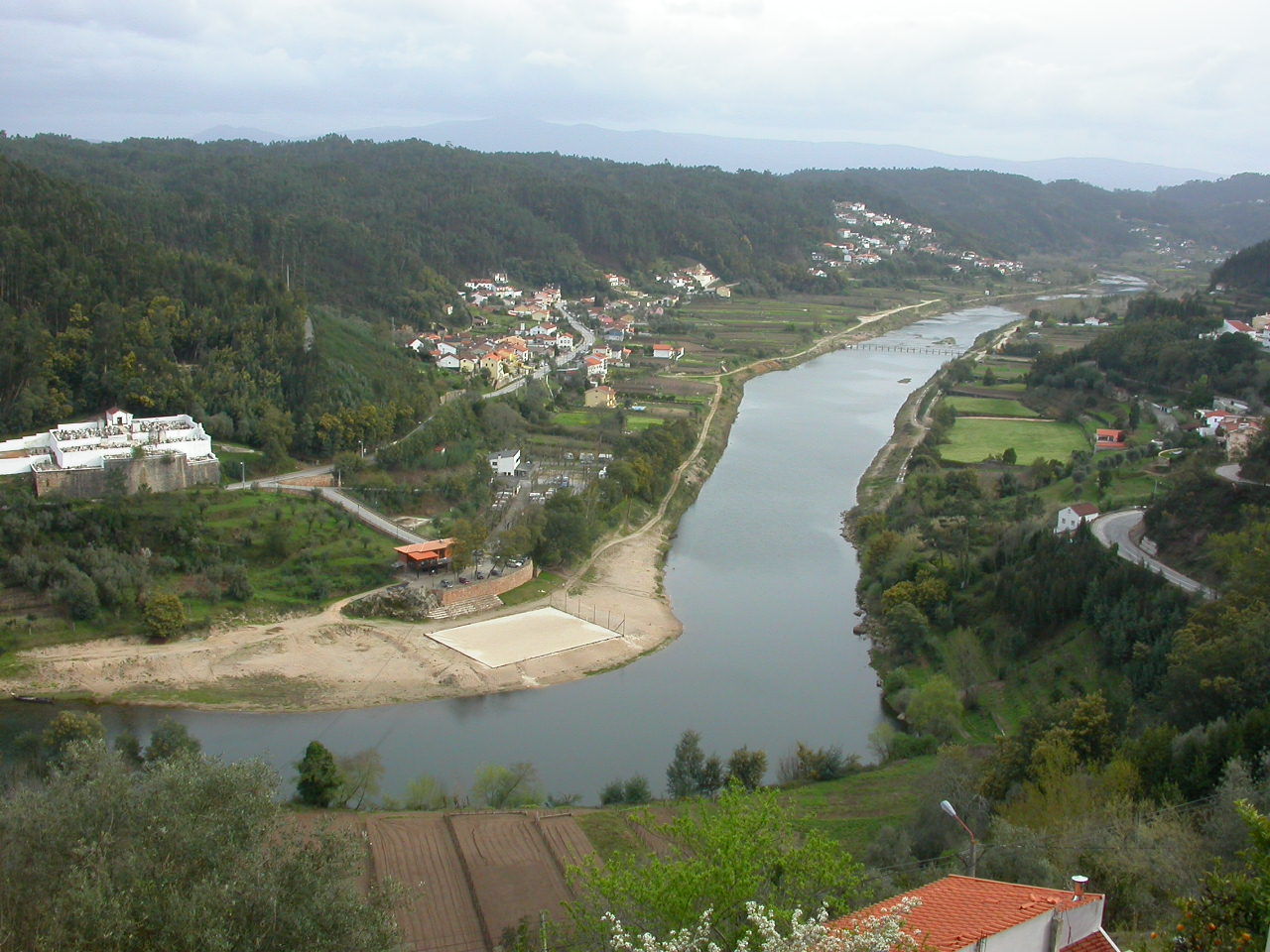
- Mondego River, near Penacova, Portugal.

- Mondego River in Portugal
- Native name: Mondego (Portuguese)

Location
- Country: Portugal
- Region: Central Region

Physical characteristics
- Source: Serra da Estrela
  - location: Gouveia
  - elevation: 1,425 metres (4,675 ft)
- Mouth: Figueira da Foz
  - location: Atlantic Ocean, Figueira da Foz, Coimbra District, Centro, Portugal
  - elevation: 0 m (0 ft)
- Length: 234 km (145 mi)
- Basin size: 6,670 km^{2} (2,580 sq mi)
- Discharge
  - location: Figueira da Foz
  - average: 108 m^{3}/s (3,800 cu ft/s)

Basin features
- Tributaries
  - left: Alva, Ceira, Arunca, and Pranto
  - right: Dão

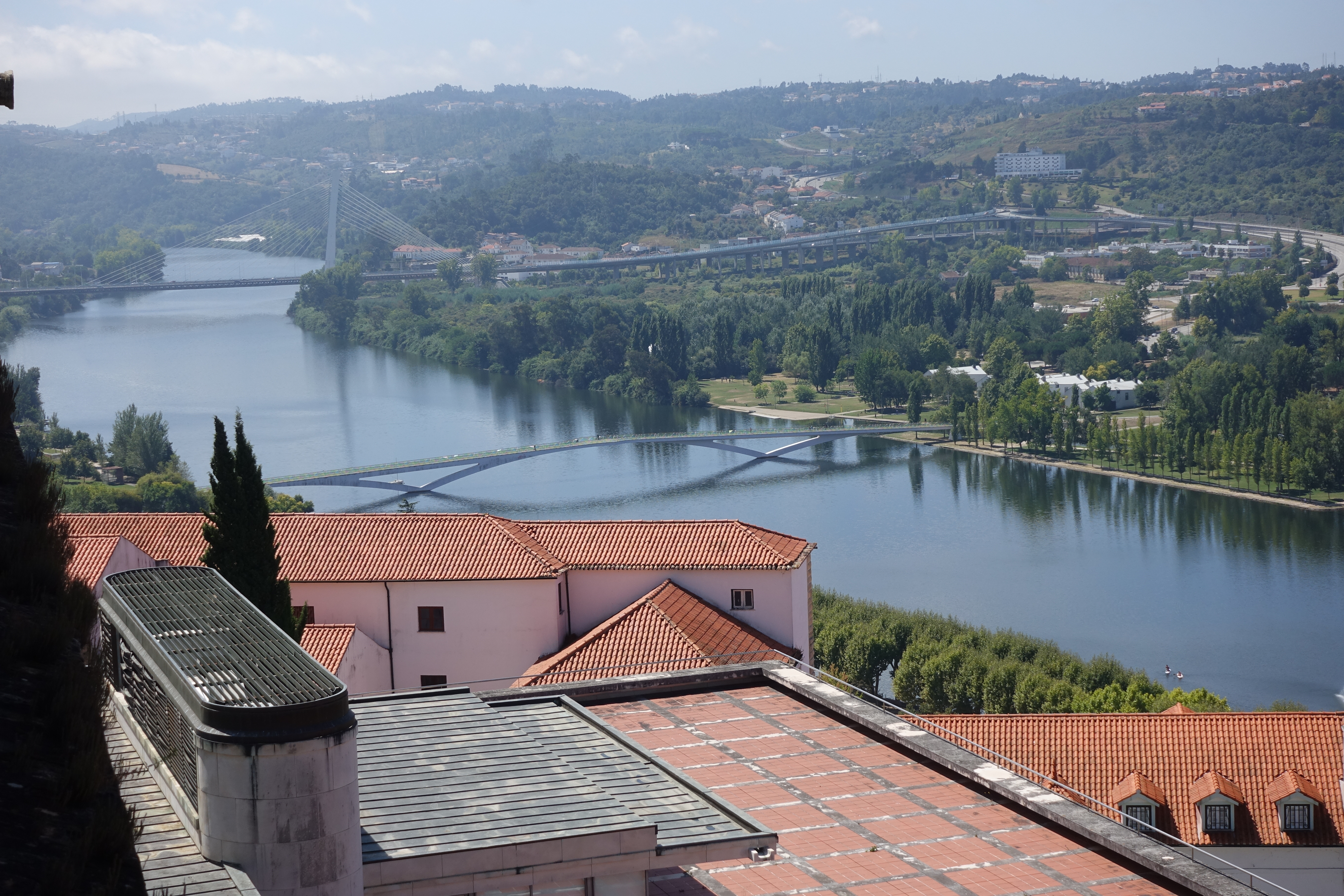
Mondego River in Coimbra.

The Mondego River, (Note: European Portuguese: [ˈʁi.u mõˈdeɣu]) also known as Mondego, is the longest river entirely within Portuguese territory. It has its source in Serra da Estrela, the highest mountain range in mainland Portugal (i.e. excluding the Portuguese islands). It runs 234 kilometres (145 mi) from the Gouveia municipality, at 1,425 metres (4,675 ft) above sea level in Serra da Estrela, to its mouth in the Atlantic Ocean next to the city of Figueira da Foz.

== Etymology ==
The river's name is believed to be derived from the pre-Roman, Hispano-Celtic word Munda or Monda — by which names it had been referred to in the classical antiquity by Pliny and Ptolemy —, later latinised into Mondæcus until evolving into the present name.

== Geography ==
It flows through the districts of Guarda, Viseu and Coimbra, all in Central Portugal. It flows near the towns of Celorico da Beira, Fornos de Algodres, Nelas, Tábua, Carregal do Sal and Mortágua and the cities of Seia, Gouveia, Guarda, Oliveira do Hospital, Mangualde and Santa Comba Dão, before crossing the town of Penacova. The river widens by the city of Coimbra (a historical city, the largest of the region, with a university as a World Heritage Site), and the Montemor-o-Velho municipality (known for its castle and rice fields), before reaching the Atlantic Ocean at the city of Figueira da Foz.

There are two main dams along the Mondego, the Aguieira Dam and the Raiva Dam, as well as a smaller one at Coimbra's main bridge.

=== Tributaries ===
One of its tributaries is the Rio Dão, which gives its name to the Dão wine region. Another is the Alva River, which enters the Mondego just before Penacova. The Ceira River enters the Mondego just south of Coimbra along National Road 17.

== See also ==
- Serra da Estrela
- Baixo Mondego
- Beiras
- Coimbra
- Figueira da Foz
- Coimbra University
- Castles in Portugal
- Cities in Portugal
