= Santa Clara (Coimbra) =

- Civil parish
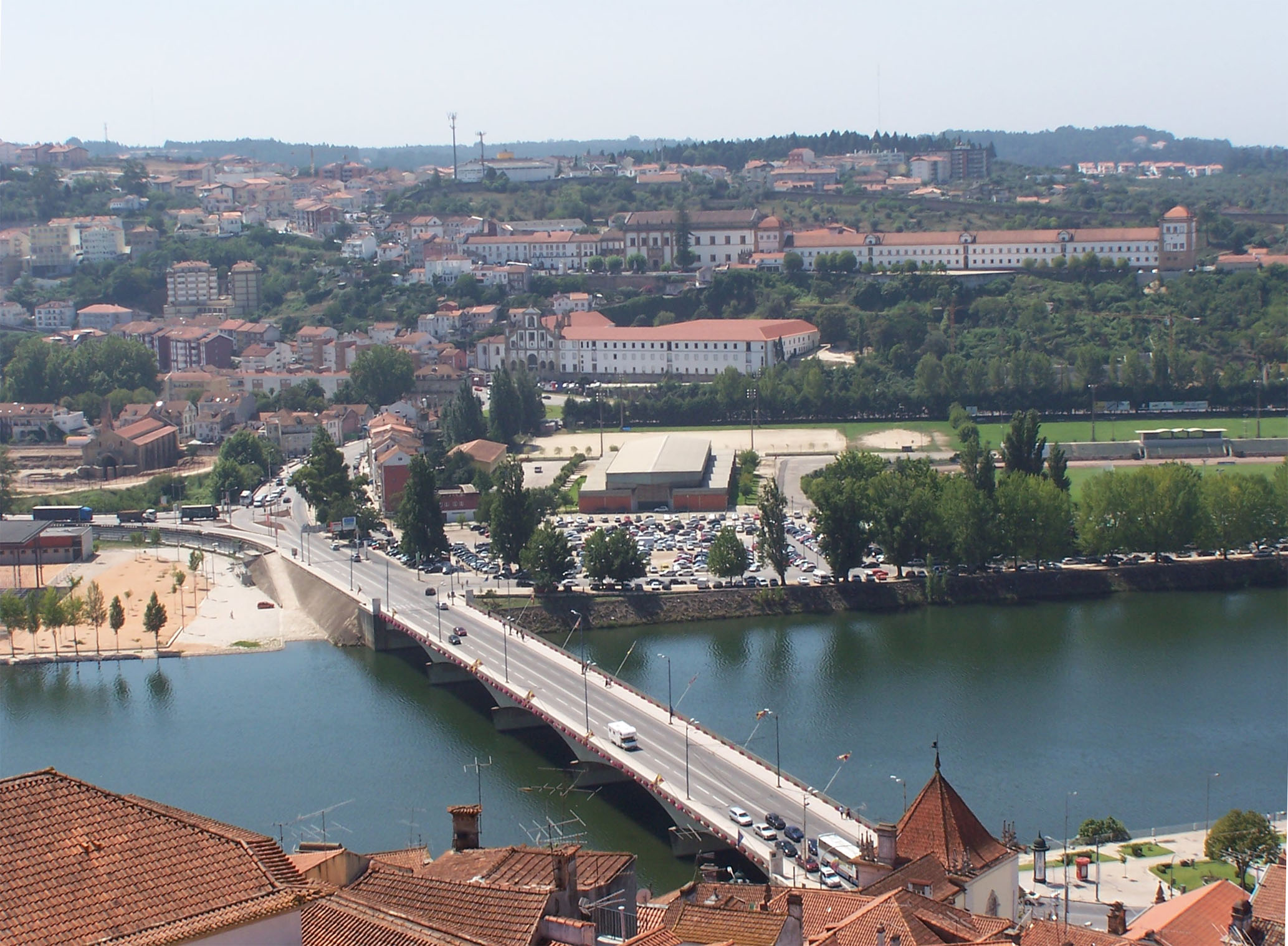
- A view of the parish of Santa Clara in Coimbra on the south bank (left bank) of the Mondego river

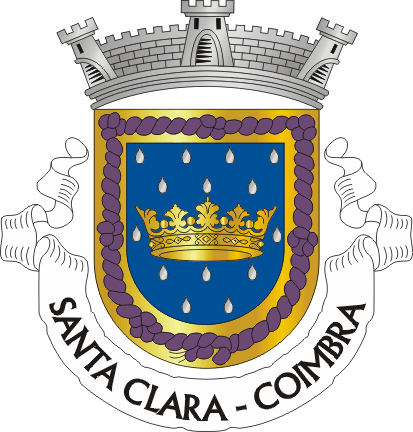
- Coat of arms

- Location in Portugal
- Coordinates: 40°11′27″N 8°26′18″W
- Country: Portugal
- Region: Centro
- Intermunic. comm.: Região de Coimbra
- District: Coimbra
- Municipality: Coimbra
- Established: 1855
- Disbanded: 28 January 2013

Area
  - Total: 9.77 km^{2} (3.77 sq mi)

Population (2011)
  - Total: 9,929
  - Density: 1,020/km^{2} (2,630/sq mi)
- Time zone: UTC+00:00 (WET)
  - Summer (DST): UTC+01:00 (WEST)

Santa Clara is a former civil parish in the municipality of Coimbra, Portugal. It was also known as São Francisco or São Francisco da Ponte after its foundation in 1855. The population in 2011 was 9,929, in an area of 9.77 km^{2}. On 28 January 2013 it merged with Castelo Viegas to form Santa Clara e Castelo Viegas.

Population of the civil parish of Santa Clara (1864–2011)
Year	Pop.	±%
1864	1,368	—
1878	1,486	+8.6%
1890	1,660	+11.7%
1900	1,909	+15.0%
1911	2,450	+28.3%
1920	2,920	+19.2%
1930	3,406	+16.6%
1940	4,135	+21.4%
1950	5,473	+32.4%
1960	5,706	+4.3%
1970	6,026	+5.6%
1981	9,826	+63.1%
1991	8,609	−12.4%
2001	9,637	+11.9%
2011	9,929	+3.0%

== Cultural heritage, monuments and other attractions ==
- Monastery of Santa Clara-a-Nova (National Monument)
- Monastery of Santa Clara-a-Velha (National Monument)
- Quinta das Lágrimas
- Portugal dos Pequenitos
- Ponte de Santa Clara (bridge)
- Coimbra University Stadium
