= Casilda of Toledo =

Christian saint

Saint Casilda de Toledo
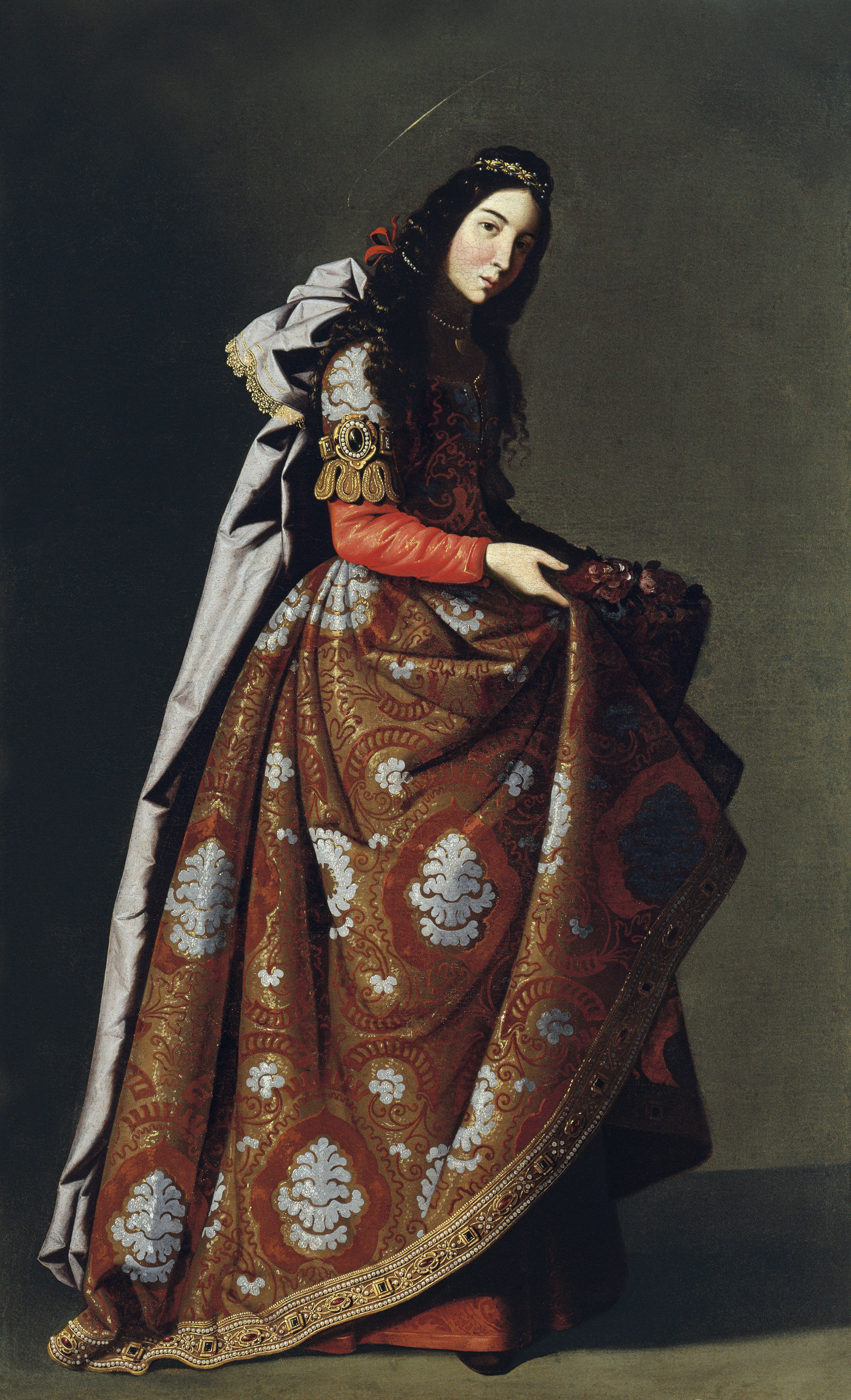
- Saint Casilda, by Francisco de Zurbarán
- Born: 950; Toledo
- Died: 1050; Briviesca
- Venerated in: Catholic Church, Orthodox Church
- Beatified: Pre-Congregation
- Feast: 9 April
- Attributes: Roses in her basket or dress
- Patronage: Muslim converts to Christianity; Infertile women; Toledo, Spain

Saint Casilda of Toledo (Latin: Sancta Casilda Toletensis Spanish: Santa Casilda de Toledo) (950–1050) is venerated as a saint of the Catholic Church and the Eastern Orthodox Church. Her feast day is 9 April.

Casilda was a Muslim princess, the daughter of the emir of Taifa of Toledo. She showed great kindness to Christian captives. Like Elizabeth of Hungary and Elizabeth of Portugal, the miracle of the roses was attached to her legend. While Casilda supposedly predated both Elizabeths, her hagiography was not written until three centuries after her death, and is likely influenced by the story of one of them.

== Life ==
According to her legend, St. Casilda, a daughter of a Muslim king of Toledo, Yahya ibn Ismail Al-Mamun, showed great compassion for Christian prisoners by frequently smuggling bread into the prison, hidden in a basket concealed in her clothes, to feed them. Once, she was stopped by her father and his Muslim soldiers, and asked to reveal what she was carrying in her skirt. When she began to show them, the bread turned into a bouquet of roses.

She was raised a Muslim, but when she became ill as a young woman, she refused help from the local Arab doctors and traveled to northern Iberia to partake of the healing waters of the shrine of San Vicente, near Buezo, close to Briviesca. When she was cured, she was baptized at Burgos (where she was later venerated) and lived a life of solitude and penance not far from the miraculous spring. It is said that she lived to be 100 years old.

== Gallery ==
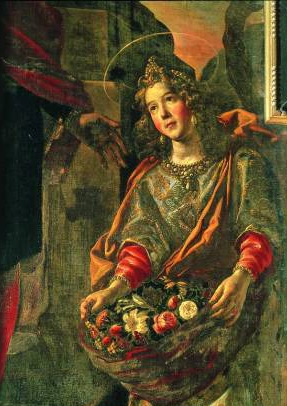
Saint Casilda, by Juan Rizi

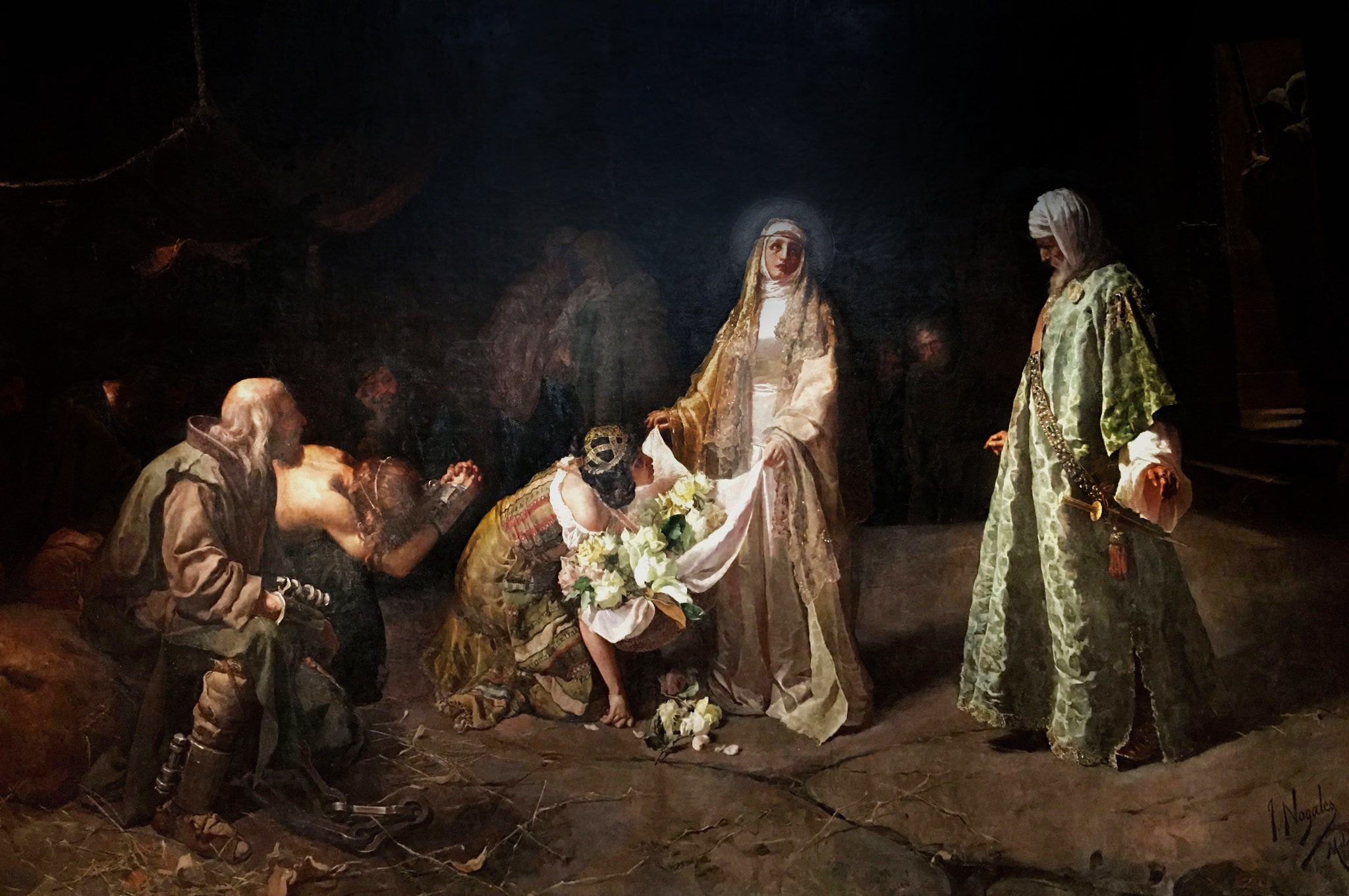
The Miracle of the Roses; by José Nogales Sevilla

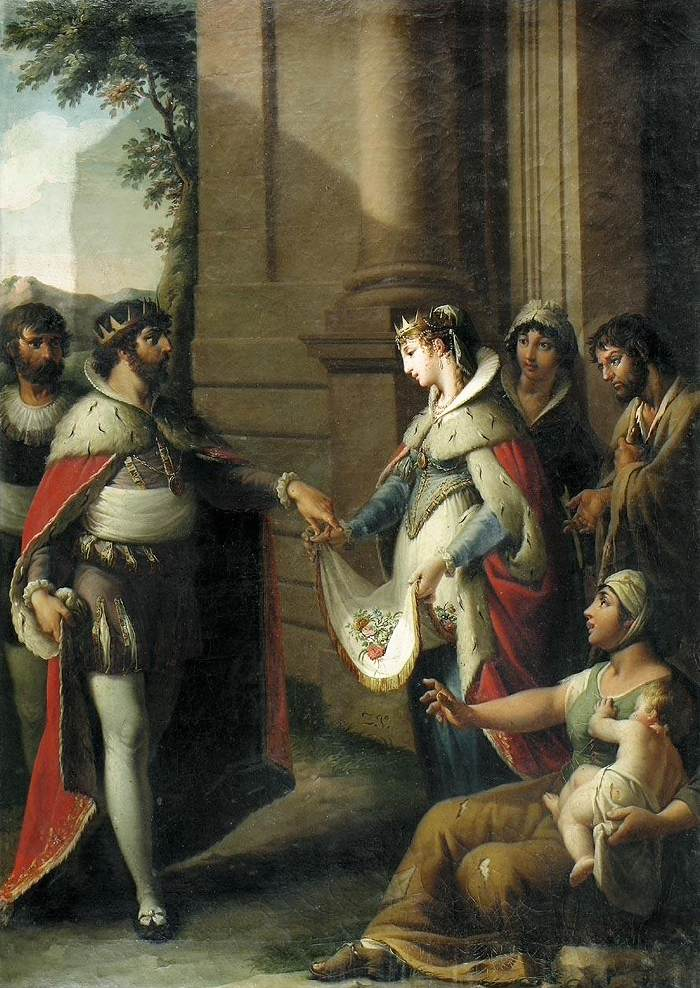
The miracle of St Casilda by Zacarías González Velázquez

Painted between 1638 and 1642, Zurbarán's Santa Casilda used as its model a lady of the Spanish court. She wears the fashions for courtiers of the time.

== Bibliography ==
- Concha Espina, Casilda de Toledo (Madrid: Biblioteca nueva, 1940)

== See also ==
- Saint Casilda of Toledo, patron saint archive
