= Castelo Viegas =

- Civil parish
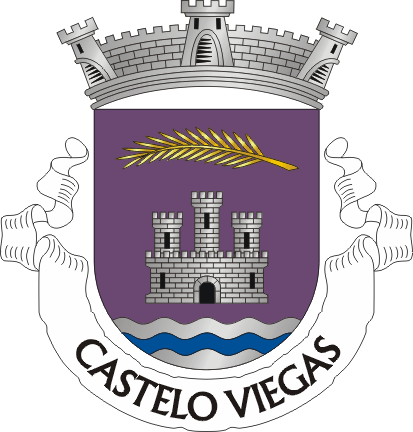
- Coat of arms

- Location in Portugal
- Coordinates: 40°9′54″N 8°24′27″W
- Country: Portugal
- Region: Centro
- Intermunic. comm.: Região de Coimbra
- District: Coimbra
- Municipality: Coimbra
- Disbanded: 28 January 2013

Area
  - Total: 7.11 km^{2} (2.75 sq mi)

Population (2011)
  - Total: 1,695
  - Density: 240/km^{2} (620/sq mi)
- Time zone: UTC+00:00 (WET)
  - Summer (DST): UTC+01:00 (WEST)
- Patron: Saint Stephen

Castelo Viegas is a former civil parish in the municipality of Coimbra, Portugal. The population in 2011 was 1,695, in an area of 7.11 km^{2}. On 28 January 2013 it merged with Santa Clara to form Santa Clara e Castelo Viegas.

The first mention is in 1122 with the name Castel Venegas.

Population of the civil parish of Castelo Viegas (1864–2011)
Year	Pop.	±%
1864	515	—
1878	586	+13.8%
1890	638	+8.9%
1900	547	−14.3%
1911	531	−2.9%
1920	594	+11.9%
1930	577	−2.9%
1940	657	+13.9%
1950	1,039	+58.1%
1960	1,613	+55.2%
1970	1,096	−32.1%
1981	1,577	+43.9%
1991	1,833	+16.2%
2001	1,771	−3.4%
2011	1,695	−4.3%
