= Miracle of the roses =

Group of miracles in Catholicism

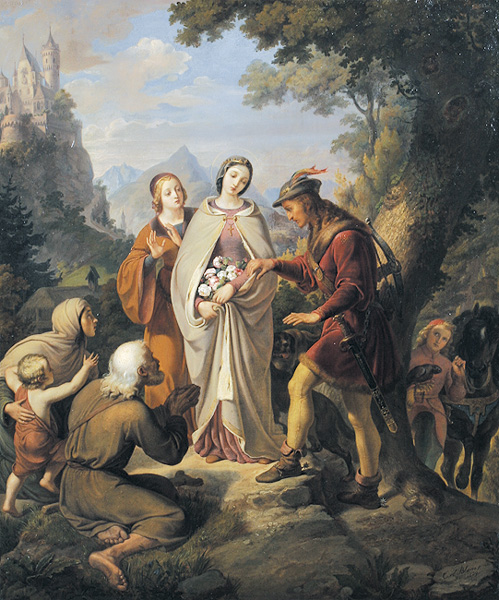
St. Elizabeth of Hungary: Miracle of the roses by Karl von Blaas, 1839

Within Catholicism, a miracle of the roses is a miracle in which roses manifest an activity of God. Such a miracle is presented in various hagiographies and legends in different forms, and it occurs in connection with diverse individuals such as Saints Elizabeth of Hungary (1207–1231), Elizabeth of Portugal (1271–1336), Saint Dorothy, a 4th-century virgin martyr at Caesarea in Cappadocia (died c. 311), and Our Lady of Guadalupe (appeared in 1531).

== Symbolism of the rose ==
The symbolism of the rose is of Greco-Roman heritage, but influenced by and modified through Latin biblical and liturgical texts. In Greco-Roman culture, the rose's symbolic qualities represented beauty, the season of spring, and love. It also spoke of the fleetingness of life, and therefore of death. In Rome the feast called "Rosalia" was a feast of the dead: thus the flower referred to the next world.

This symbolism attained a deeper complexity when contrasted with the rose's thorns. This contrast inspired the Christian Latin poet Coelius Sedulius, who wrote (between 430 and 450) a very elaborate comparison between Eve and Mary. He illustrated the parallelism already made by Justin Martyr (around 150) and developed it in a deep poetic and doctrinal liturgical teaching in his Easter song, Carmen paschal.

The rose was a privileged symbol for Mary. One of her titles in Catholic Marian devotion is Rosa Mystica or Mystic Rose. During the Middle Ages, the rose became an attribute of many other holy women, including Elizabeth of Hungary, Elizabeth of Portugal and Casilda of Toledo, and of martyrs in general. The rose even became a symbol for Jesus himself, as seen in the German Christmas song, "es ist ein 'Rose' entsprungen."

During the Middle Ages, the rose was cultivated in monastery gardens and used for medicinal purposes. It became a symbol in religious writing and iconography in different images and settings, to invoke a variety of intellectual and emotional responses. The mystic rose appears in Dante's Divine Comedy, where it represents God's love. By the twelfth century, the red rose had come to represent Christ's passion, and the blood of the martyrs.

The most common association of the rose is with the Virgin Mary. The third-century Saint Ambrose believed that there were roses in the Garden of Eden, initially without thorns, but which became thorny after the fall, and came to symbolize Original Sin itself. Thus the Blessed Virgin is often referred to as the 'rose without thorns', since she was immaculately conceived. Saint Bernard of Clairvaux compared her virginity to a white rose and her charity to a red rose. With the rise of Marian devotion and the Gothic cathedral in the twelfth century, the image of the rose became even more prominent in religious life. Cathedrals built around this time usually include a rose window, dedicated to the Virgin, at the end of a transept or above the entrance. The thirteenth century Saint Dominic is credited with the institution of the Rosary, a series of prayers to the Virgin, symbolized by garlands of roses worn in Heaven.

== Saint Elizabeth of Hungary ==
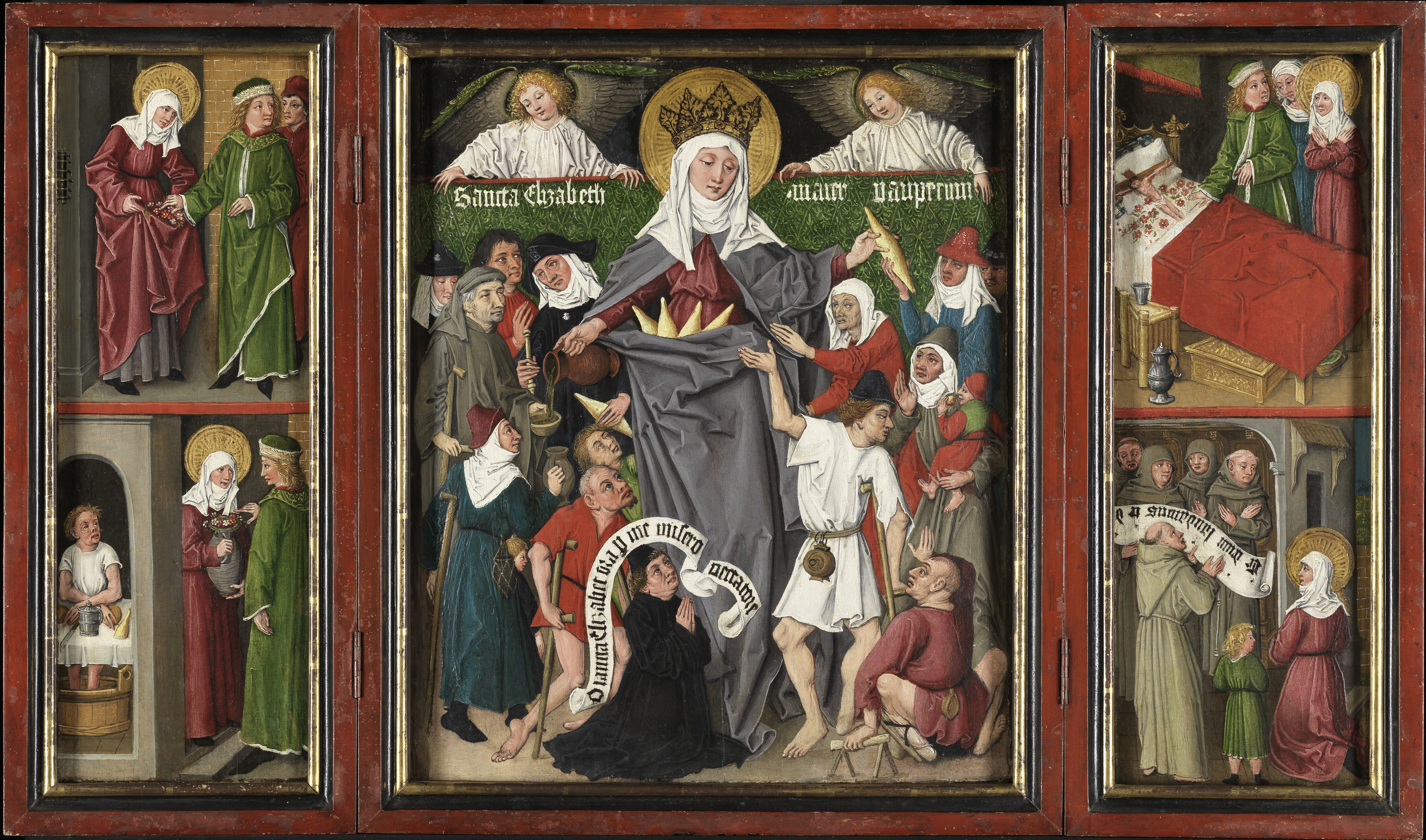
Elizabeth of Hungary, detail from a triptych (Master of the Drapery Studies c. 1480–90)

In Western Europe, the best-known version of a miracle of the roses concerns Saint Elizabeth of Hungary (also called Elisabeth of Thuringia), the daughter of King Andrew II of Hungary, who spent most of her life living with her in-laws in Germany (a ruling family of Thuringia), who kept court at Wartburg Castle.

=== Origins ===
It has been suggested that the legend originated in a sermon given by Caesarius of Heisterbach in which he reflects on the occasion of the translation of the remains of Saint Elizabeth, in 1236. Caesarius speaks of a sweet aroma that emanates from the grave as soon as it is opened (a common theme in hagiography). This metaphorical or actual aroma could have been translated into a physical event, the miracle of the roses. The first report of a miracle resembling that of the roses is by Franciscans in the mid-13th century. Their account is of spring flowers, and the event takes place in Hungary, at Elizabeth's home when she was five years old. The miracle as we know it, with roses and in Germany, is first reported in 1332, in a Franciscan book of prayers, though it has also been proposed that the miracle was "translated" from Elizabeth of Portugal to Elisabeth of Hungary in the 19th century.

=== The legend ===
In its most characteristic form the legend goes as follows. One day the young but pious Elizabeth, in the company of one or more serving women, descends from Wartburg Castle down to the village of Eisenach, below the castle. She is carrying meat, eggs, and bread under her mantle. Supposedly she has taken items from the family dining table to distribute to the poor in the village, against the wishes of her family, who frown upon such behavior. Halfway down, she unexpectedly meets her husband Ludwig IV of Thuringia, who asks, upon seeing her bulk, what she is carrying. Embarrassed and speechless as she is, she does not know what to say. Ludwig opens her mantle, and to his surprise (in some versions this takes place in the dead of winter) finds her carrying a bouquet of roses.

=== Similar versions ===
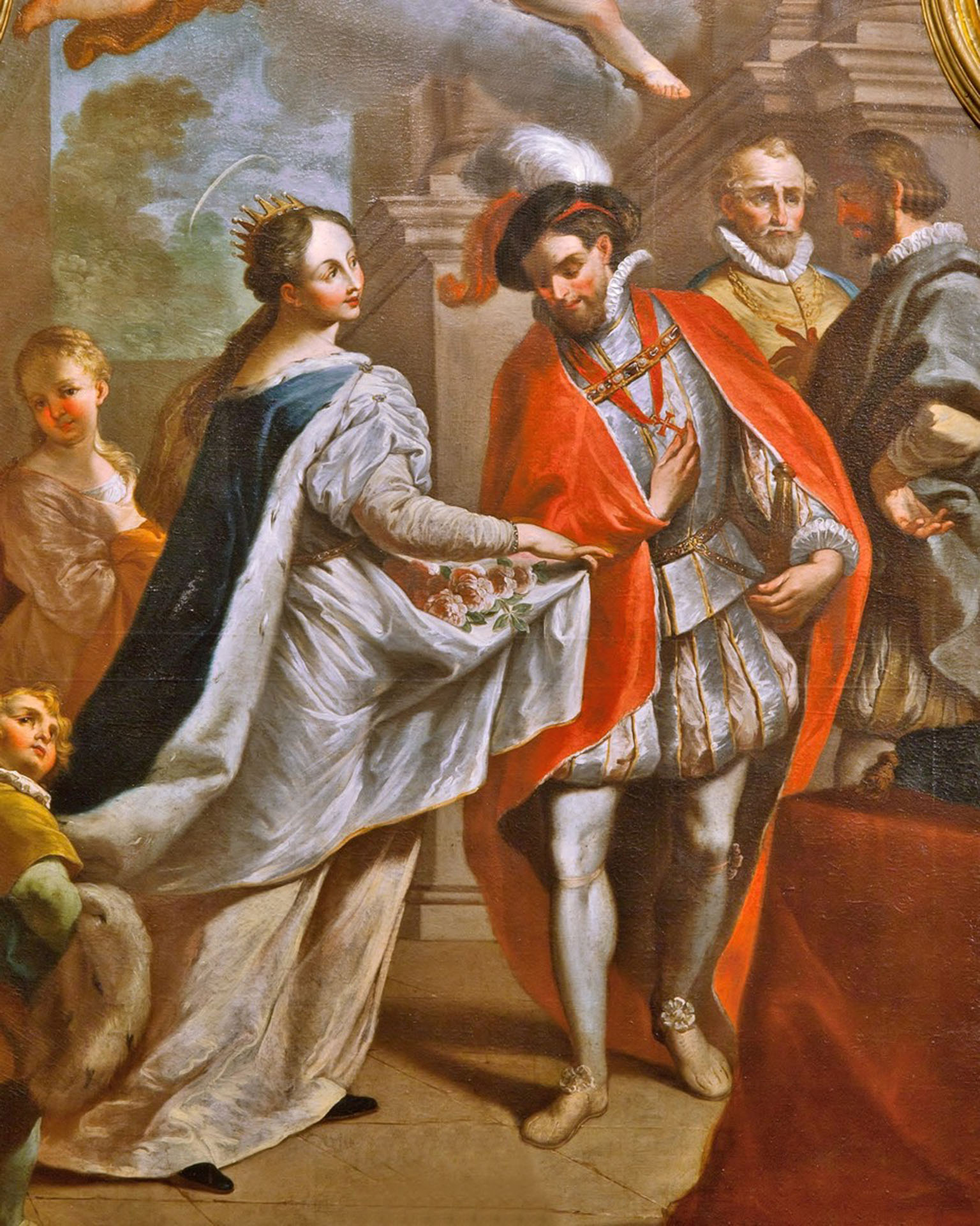
Elizabeth of Portugal

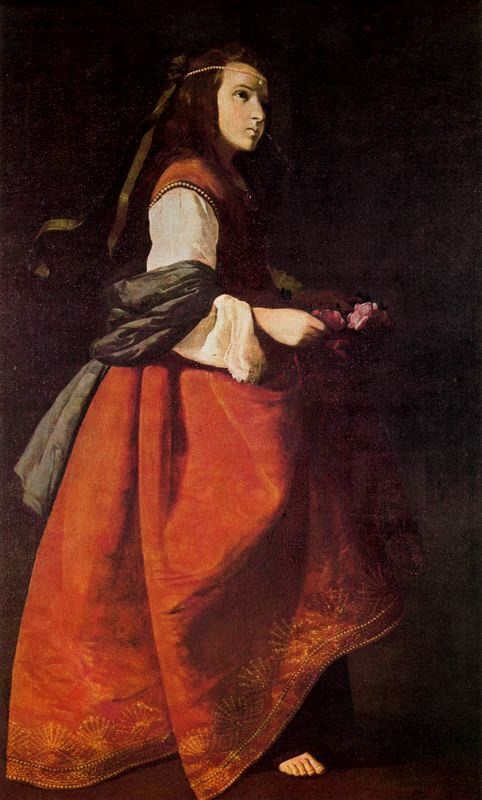
Santa Casilda

==== Saint Elizabeth of Portugal ====
Very much the same story is told of Elizabeth of Portugal (1271–1336), a great-niece of Elizabeth of Hungary. Married to the profligate King Denis of Portugal, she, like her great-aunt, showed great devotion at an early age, and likewise was charitable toward the poor, against the wishes of her husband. Caught one day by her husband, while carrying bread in her apron, the food was turned into roses. Since this occurred in January, King Denis reportedly had no response and let his wife continue. The story is somewhat apocryphal; while it shows up in popular versions of the saint's life, the account is missing from more authoritative sources such as the revised 1991 edition of Alban Butler's Lives of the Saints.

==== Saint Casilda of Toledo ====
Similar also is the legend of Casilda of Toledo (died c. 1050), a daughter of a Muslim king of Toledo, Spain, during the rule of the Caliphate, who showed special kindness to Christian prisoners. She would carry bread hidden in her clothes to feed these prisoners; one day, when caught, the bread was miraculously changed into roses. In the famous painting of Saint Casilda by the 17th-century painter Francisco Zurbarán, roses are visible in the saint's lap; the miracle is also depicted in a painting by the 19th-century painter Jose Nogales. But while Saint Casilda supposedly died in the 11th century, predating the birth of both Elizabeth of Hungary and Elizabeth of Portugal, her hagiography was not written until three centuries after her death, and is likely influenced by the legend of one of these Elizabeths.

==== Saint Didacus of Alcalá ====
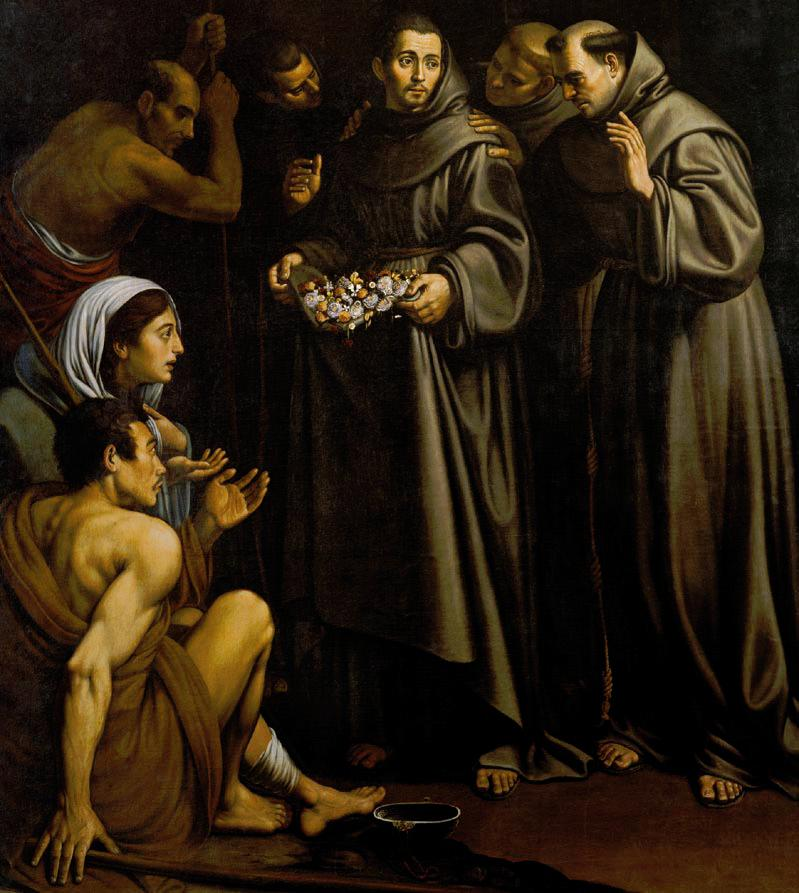
Niccolo Betti San Diego de Alcalá Descalzas Reales

Of the 15th-century Franciscan St. Didacus of Alcalá, also known as San Diego, the same miracle is told: as a lay brother of the Franciscans in Spain, he often took bread from the monastery's dining table to give to the poor. One day, leaving the convent with a cloak full of food, he was accused and challenged to open his cloak; miraculously, the loaves of bread had changed into roses.

== Our Lady of Guadalupe ==
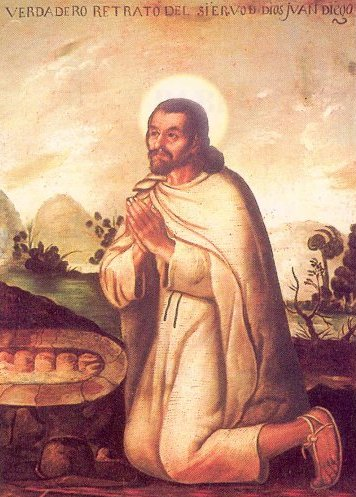
Miguel Cabrera, Juan Diego

The story of Our Lady of Guadalupe is of an entirely different character, although here again the miraculous presence of the roses in the middle of winter is a sign of the presence of the divinity. The account is a corollary to a Marian apparition, Our Lady of Guadalupe, found in the 1556 booklet Huei tlamahuiçoltica. Reportedly occurring in 1531, the booklet tells the story of a native inhabitant of Mexico named Juan Diego, who receives a message from the Virgin Mary in a vision he is to convey to the local bishop to build her a shrine: "Here I will hear their weeping, their sorrow and will remedy and alleviate all their multiple sufferings, necessities and misfortunes." The bishop, however, does not believe Diego's story. The peasant returned to his field, where again the Virgin appeared to him, with the same message. Diego again goes to the bishop, with the same result. The bishop says Juan Diego has to bring a token (sign) if he is to be believed. The fourth time the Virgin appears, she directs Diego toward "varied Castilian flowers" which he picks; she then places the flowers in his mantle. (The identification of these flowers as Castilian roses or Damask roses, is a later addition.) When Juan opens his mantle, the flowers spill out, revealing an image of the Virgin miraculously that appeared on Diego's cloak. The bishop is convinced and the church built as Mary requested.

== Saint Rita of Cascia ==
A miracle involving roses occurred to Saint Rita of Cascia. The winter before the end of her life, a cousin visited her and asked her if she desired anything from her old home at Roccaporena. Saint Rita responded by asking for a rose and a fig from the garden. It was January and her cousin did not expect to find anything due to the snowy weather. However, when her relative went to the house, a single blooming rose was found in the garden, as well as a fully ripened and edible fig. Her cousin brought the rose and fig back to Saint Rita at the convent, who thanked her and gave the rose to her sisters.

The rose is thought to represent God's love for Rita and Rita's ability to intercede on behalf of lost causes or impossible cases. Rita is often depicted holding roses or with roses nearby, and on her feast day, the churches and shrines of Saint Rita provide roses to the congregation that are blessed by priests during Mass.

=== Statement of Pope John Paul II ===
On the occasion of the centenary of the canonization of Saint Rita of Cascia, Pope John Paul II stated that the worldwide devotion to Saint Rita is symbolized by the rose, and said: "It is to be hoped that the life of everyone devoted to her will be like the rose picked in the garden of Roccaporena the winter before the saint's death. That is, let it be a life sustained by passionate love for the Lord Jesus; a life capable of responding to suffering and to thorns with forgiveness and the total gift of self, in order to spread everywhere the good odour of Christ (cf. 2 Cor 2:15) through a consistently lived proclamation of the Gospel." He added that Saint Rita spiritually offers her rose to each of those he addressed as an exhortation to "live as witnesses to a hope that never disappoints and as missionaries of a life that conquers death".

== Saint Aloysius Gonzaga and Saint Thérèse of Lisieux ==
In 1617, Canon Wolfgang of Asch of Ladshut became a devotee of Saint Aloysius Gonzaga after being miraculously healed from an incurable illness after being anointed with oil from a lamp that burned before an image of the saint at Sasso in Valtellina, Italy. In 1636, the Swedes took control of Landshut and Wolfgang was taken hostage, spending nearly three years in a prison in Augsburg. Wolfgang became seriously ill as a result of the sufferings he endured in prison and laid on his death bed. He experienced a vision of Saint Aloysius standing beside his bed and scattering roses upon it. He was miraculously healed for the second time, to the astonishment of his Lutheran physician.

Sister Marie of the Sacred Heart of the Carmel in Lisieux stated in her deposotion during the beatification process for Saint Thérèse of the Child Jesus that the miracle of Saint Aloysius was the origin for Saint Thérèse's statement of letting fall a "shower of roses" after her death:

I was reading in the refectory a passage from the life of St. Aloysius Gonzaga, which told how a certain sick man saw a shower of roses fall on his bed as a sign that his prayer for a cure would be answered. At recreation afterwards she said: "I, too, will let fall a shower of roses after my death."

== Saint Faustina Kowalska ==
In her diary, Divine Mercy In My Soul, Saint Faustina Kowalska relates her own experience of a miracle of roses. During her novitiate, she was assigned kitchen duties and found it difficult to drain the water from the pot filled with potatoes due to her increasing weakness. As a result, she avoided doing the task. Encouraged by a locution from the Lord Jesus that He would give her the necessary strength, Faustina drained the pot without difficulty. When she lifed the cover from the pot, the potatoes had changed into red roses. She then heard the voice of the Lord saying to her, "I change such hard work of yours into bouquets of most beautiful flowers, and their perfume rises up to My throne."
