= Cassiano Branco =

Portuguese architect

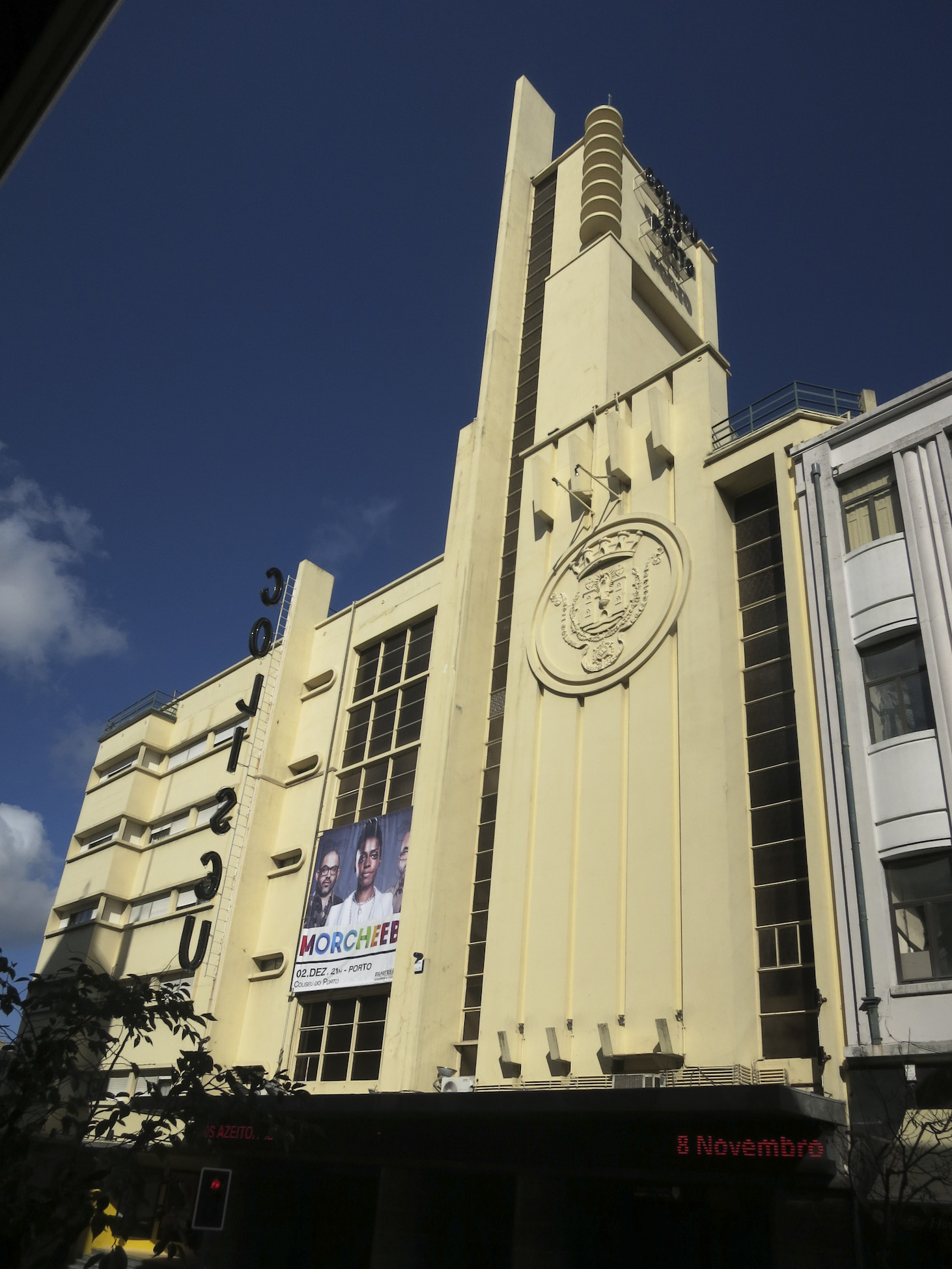
Coliseu do Porto, by Cassiano Branco

Cassiano Viriato Branco (Lisbon, August 13, 1897 – Lisbon, April 24, 1970) was a Portuguese architect. He is one of the most important architects of the first half of the 20th century in Portugal. Some of his projects include the Coliseu do Porto, Hotel Vitória and the Portugal dos Pequenitos theme park.
