= Portugal dos Pequenitos =

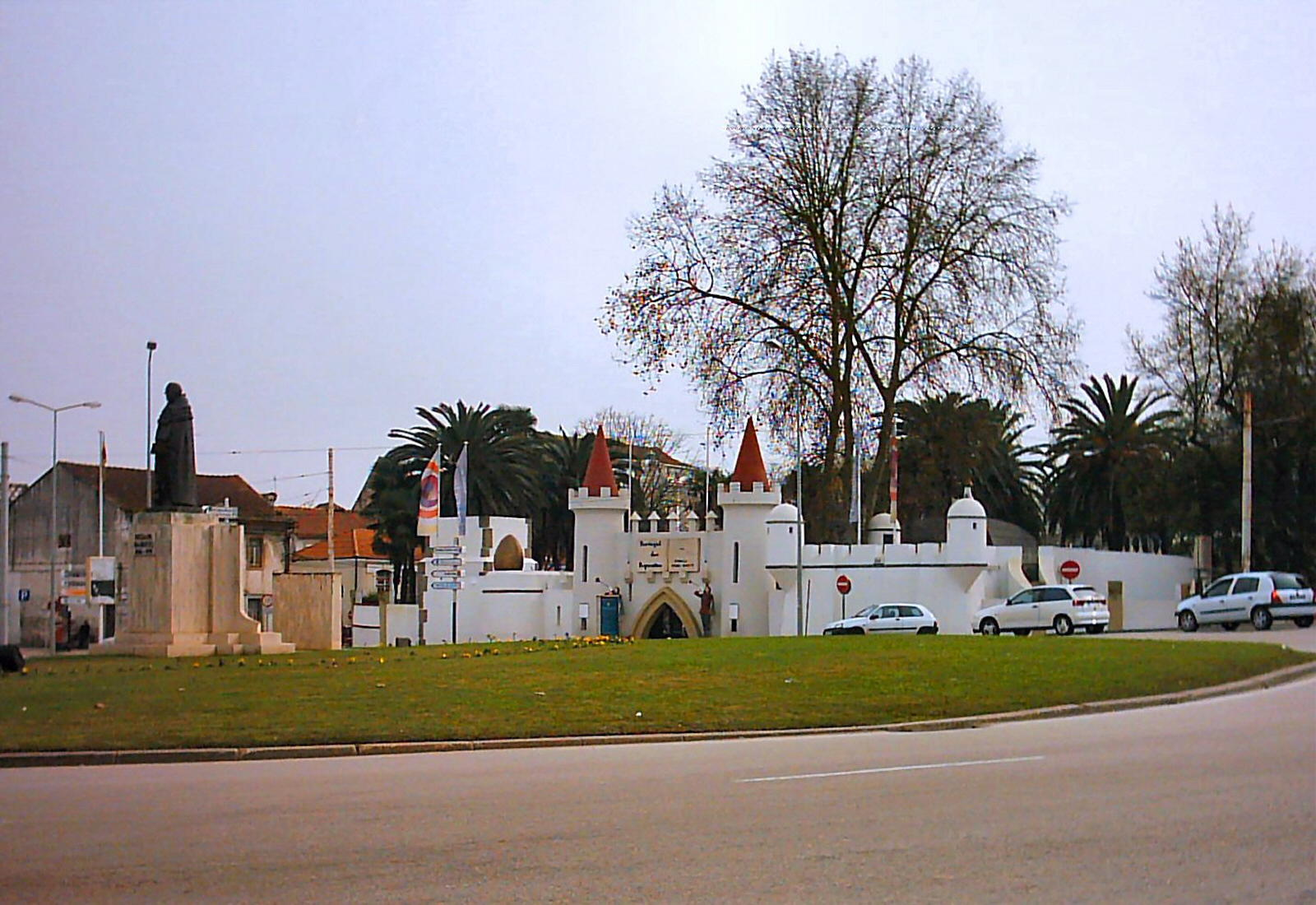
- The front facade/entrance to the miniature park
- Interactive map of the Portugal dos Pequenitos area

General information
- Type: Miniature park
- Location: Santa Clara e Castelo Viegas, Coimbra, Portugal
- Coordinates: 40°12′11″N 8°26′3″W
- Opened: 20th century
- Owner: Portuguese Republic

Design and construction
- Architect: Cassiano Branco

Website
- http://www.portugaldospequenitos.pt/

The Portugal dos Pequenitos (translated as Portugal of/for the Little Ones) is a miniature park in the civil parish of Santa Clara e Castelo Viegas, in the municipality of Coimbra, in the Portuguese district of Coimbra. The park consists of diminutive versions of Portuguese houses and monuments, and has pavilions dedicated to the former Portuguese colonies.

== History ==
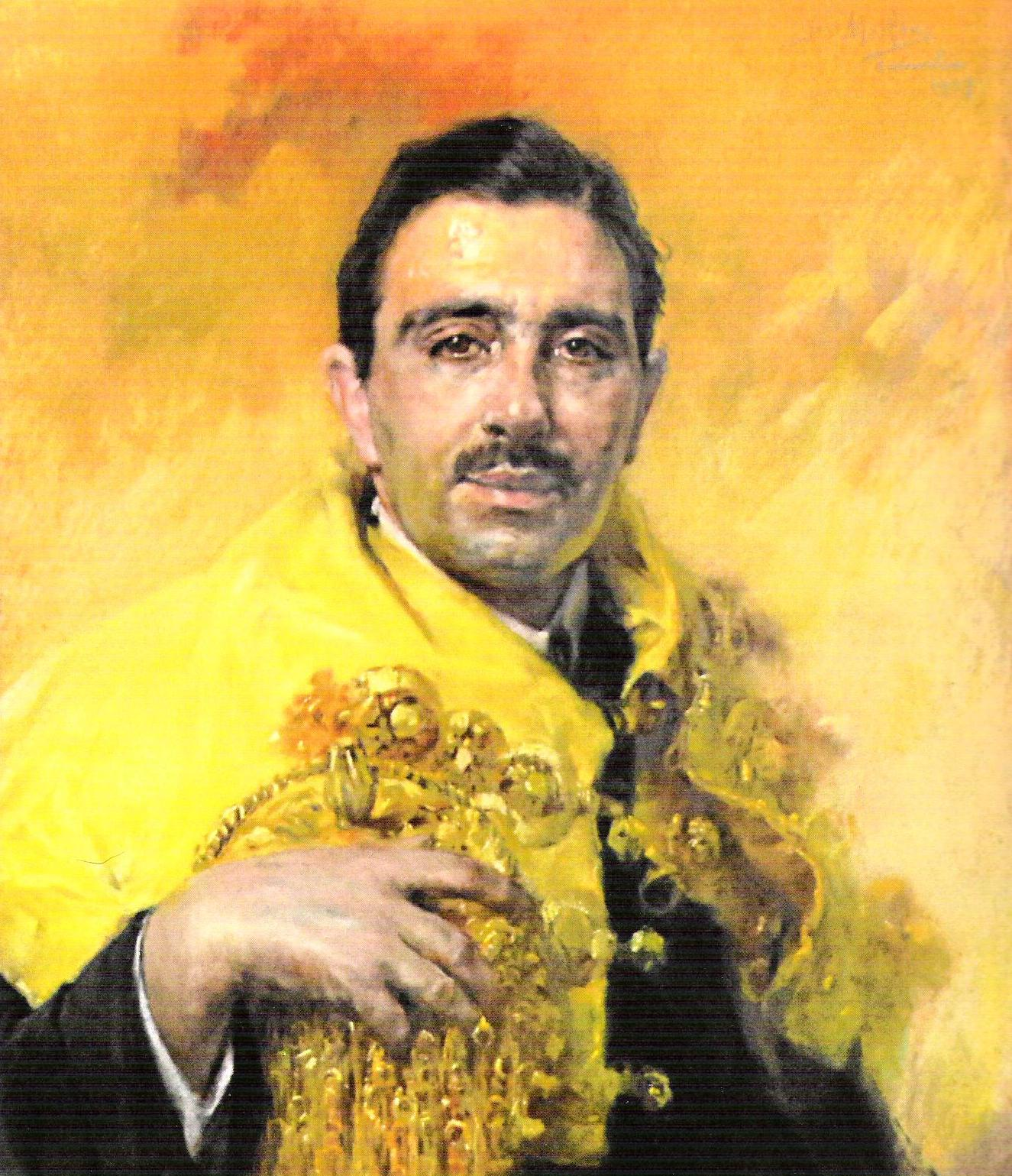
Portrait of Fernando Bissaya Barreto wearing academic regalia. A scholar and politician, he was the founder of Portugal dos Pequenitos.

The construction of the park began in 1938, an initiative of Fernando Bissaya Barreto, a professor at the Medical School of the University of Coimbra and politician, following a project developed by architect Cassiano Branco. The first phase of the project occurred between 1938 and 1940, which involved the recreation of group of structures identified as typical homes, chapels, mills and pillories located of the Trás-os-Montes and Minho region. The second phase began in the middle of the century, in an area that illustrated many of the country's monuments and heritage sites. At the end of the 1950s, the third phase was concluded. This section included pavilions dedicated to reconstitute artefacts and symbolic structures associated with the overseas provinces at the time. In addition to buildings and motifs that included representations from Portuguese Africa, Brazil, Portuguese Macau, Portuguese India and Portuguese East Timor, the area was circled by native flora, as well as buildings for the Azores and Madeira.

From 1959, the site was integrated into the heritage and patrimony of the Bissaya Barreto Foundation.

Beginning in December 2003, a new space was open to act as visitor center for activities and pedagogical events, along with a sundial, both projects designed by architect João Paulo Revez Conceição. In 2007, the park had its highest ever number of yearly visitors, a total of 331,000 visitors.

Starting in 2015, in an attempt to transform and make the site more dynamic, the board proposed new Portuguese monuments and the introduction of more regional houses to the collection.

== Architecture ==
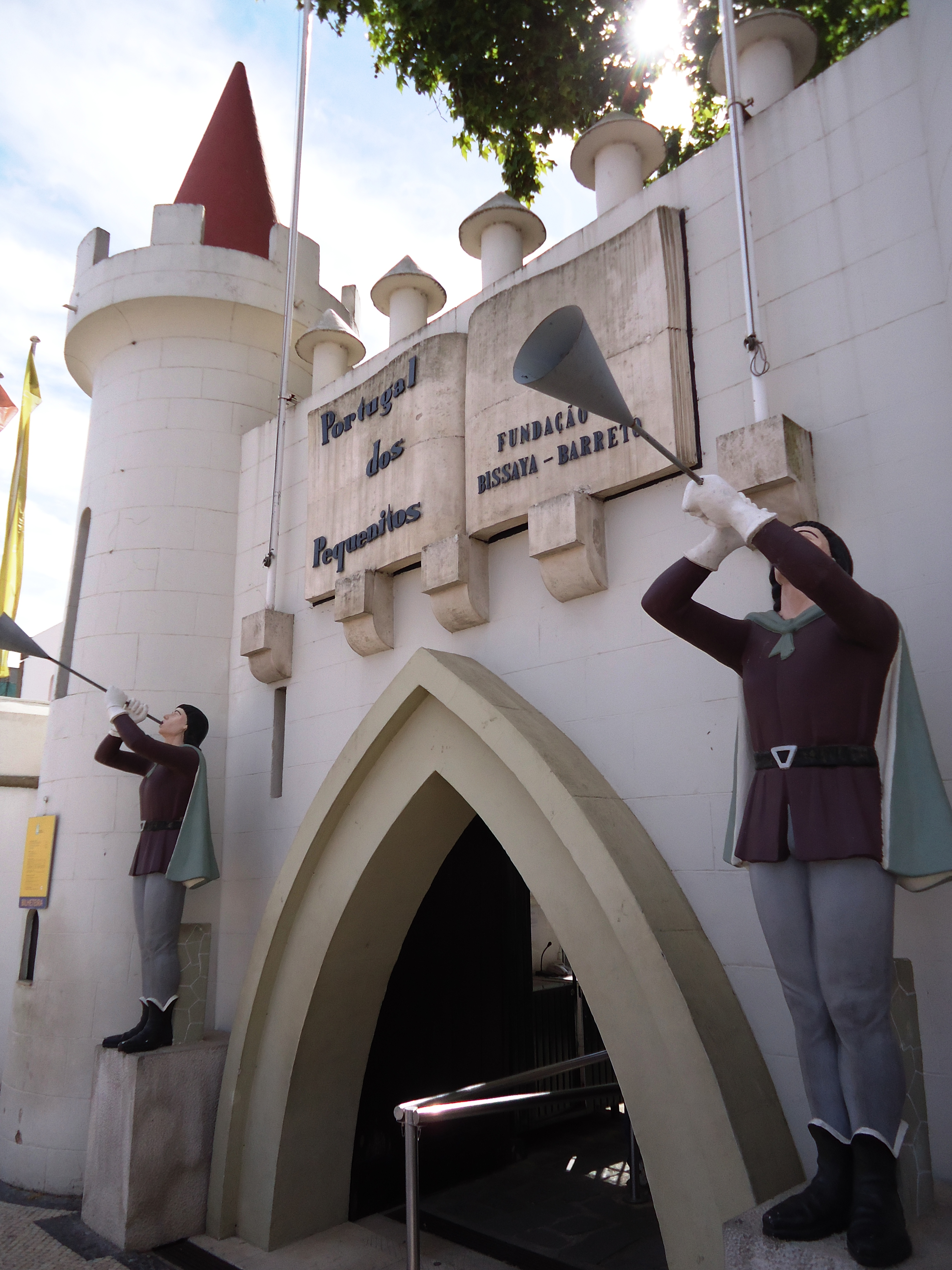
Detail from the entrance gate at Parque dos Pequenitos

The site is situated on the left bank of the Mondego River, integrated into the buildings immediately near the Monastery of Santa Clara-a-Nova (in the east), Monastery of Santa Clara-a-Velha (in the south) and the Convent of São Francisco (in the north).

The thematic park includes miniature replicas that represent the monuments and other elements from the cultural heritage and patrimony in Portugal and world, divided into three thematic areas.

The first section includes traditional architecture from various regional areas of Portugal, that included representations of manorhouses, houses of nobles and seigneurs from the Trás-os-Montes and Minho. This includes typical homes from regions along with homes from orchards, gardens, mills and pillories. East of this area is a group representing Coimbra, with representations of monuments important to the city.

The second area includes Portuguese monuments.

In the third section are ethnographic artefacts and monuments from Portuguese-speaking African countries, Brazil, Macau, India and Timor, encircled by vegetation. This section also integrates important monuments from the autonomous regions of Madeira and the Azores.

== Gallery ==
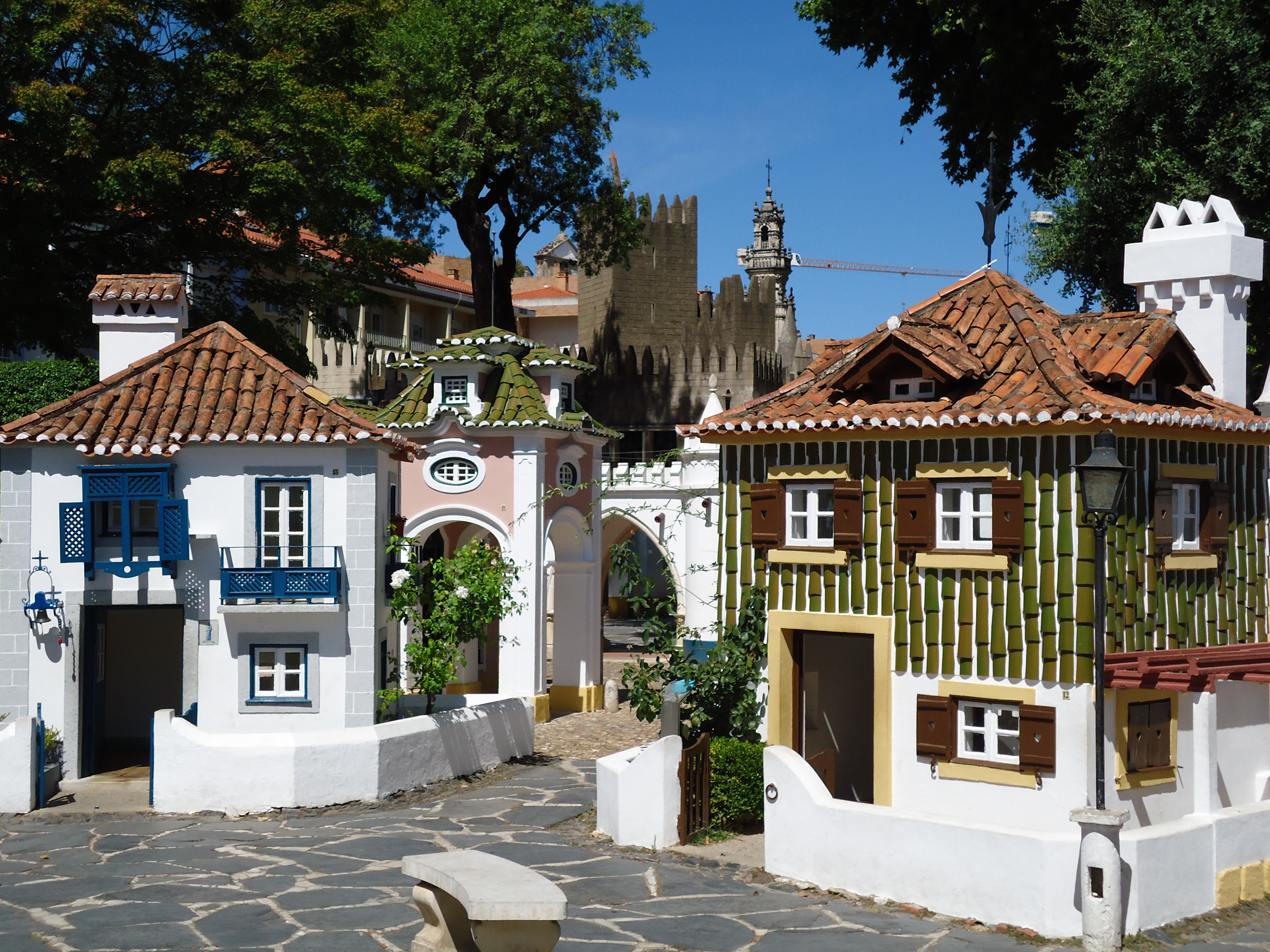
Examples of traditional signeurial homes from Alto Trás-os-Montes

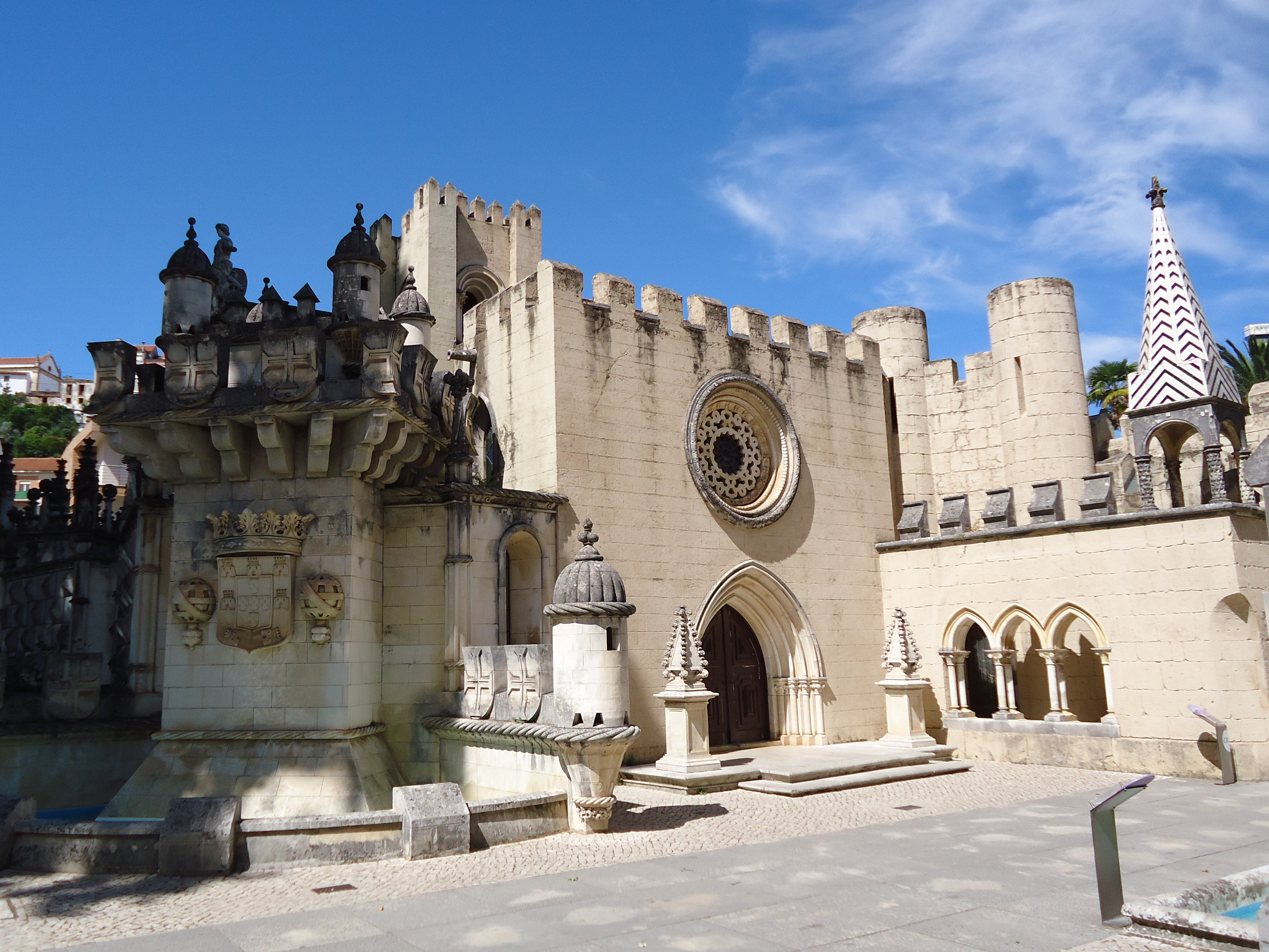
The Coimbra-related diorama of monuments, highlighted by the Sé Cathedral

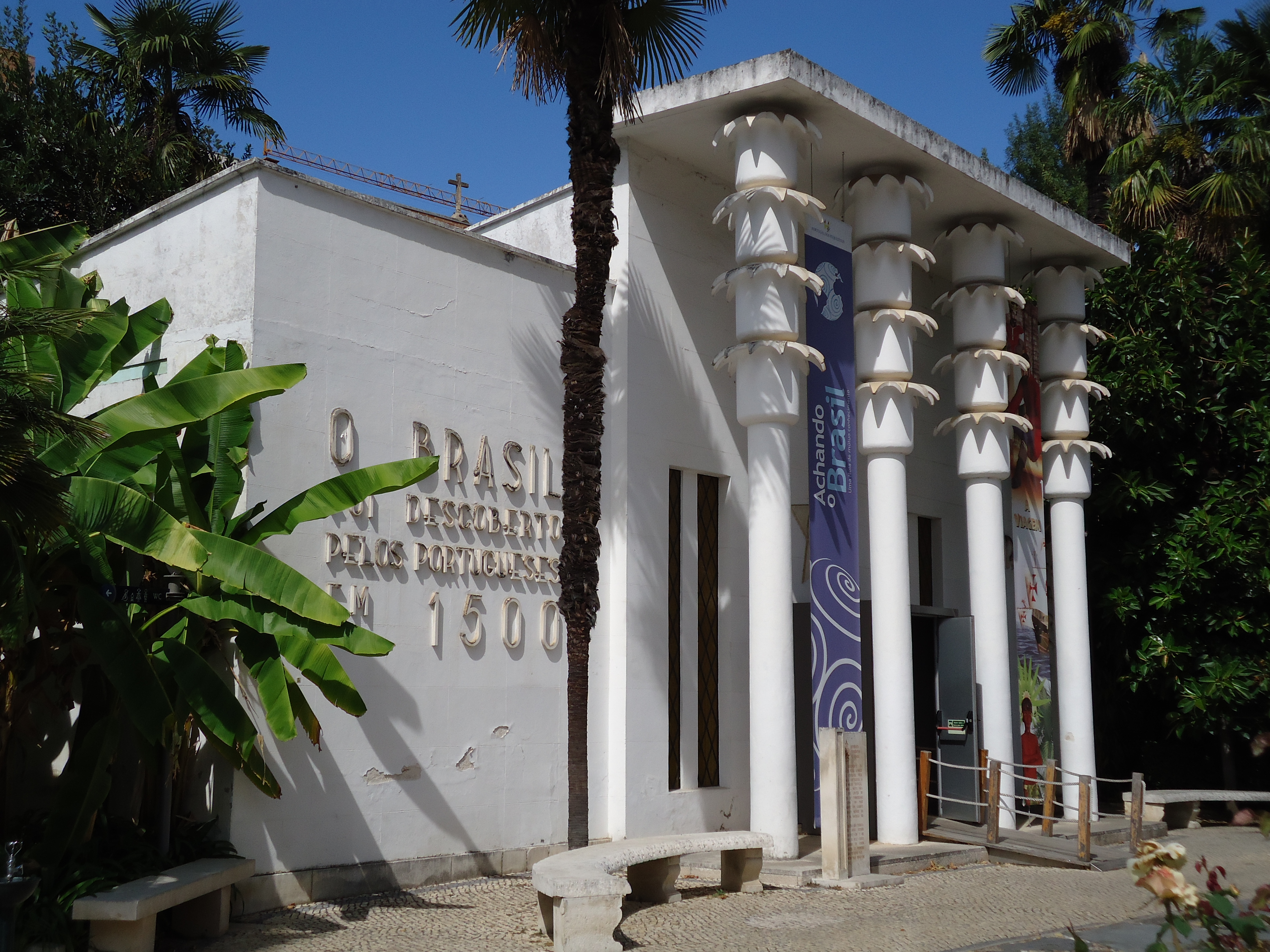
The monumental Brazilian pavilion near the entrance

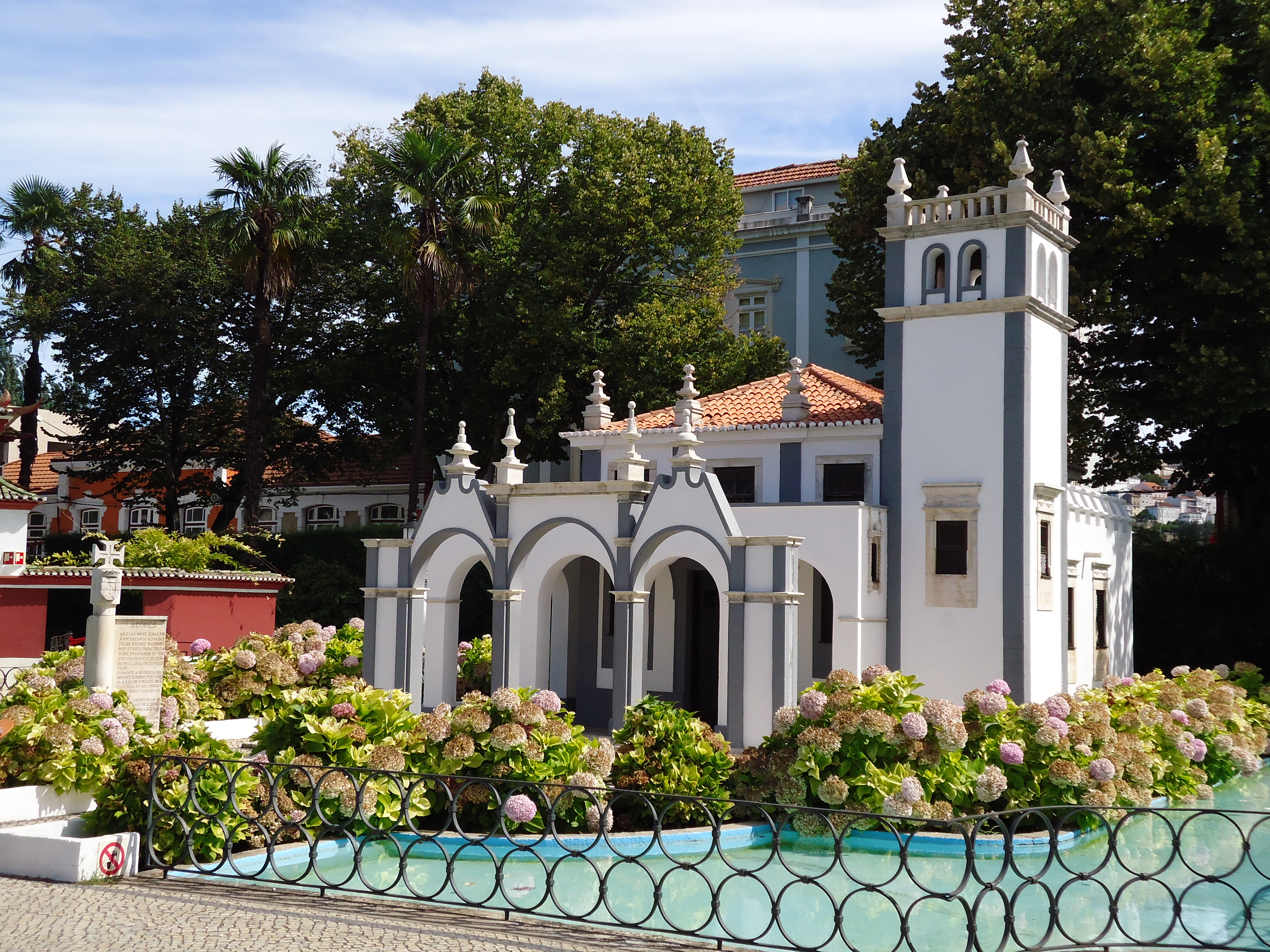
The diorama for the Azores with church and Portas da Cidade

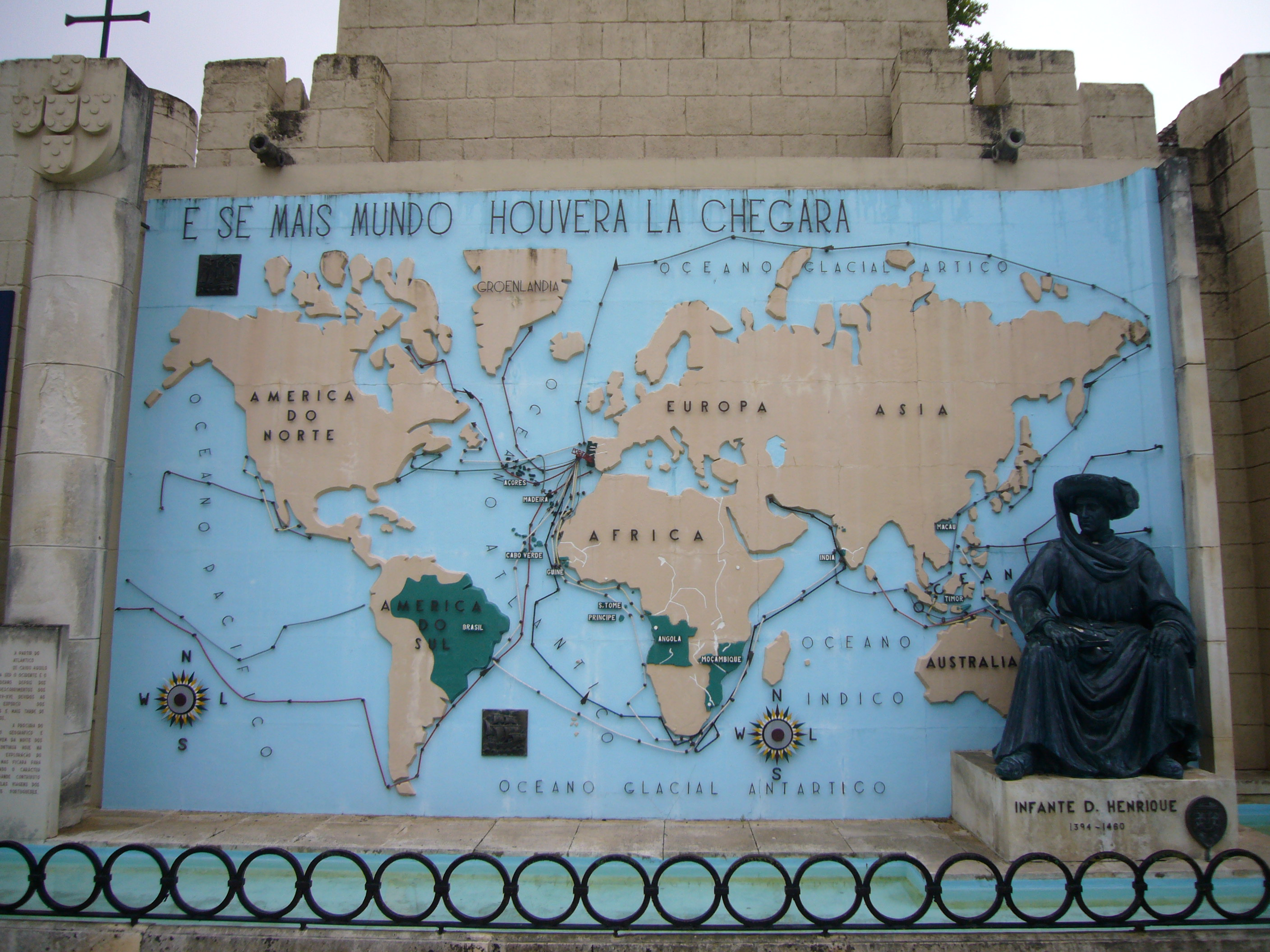
World map of the Portuguese Empire and statue of Henry the Navigator
