= José Nogales Sevilla =

Spanish painter and watercolourist

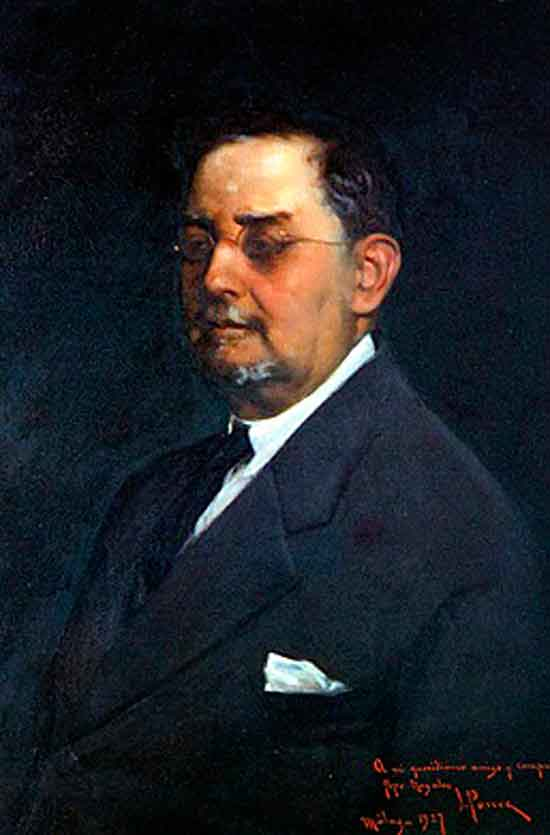
- Self-portrait (date unknown)
- Born: José Valentín Nogales y Sevilla; 3 November 1860; Málaga
- Died: 28 November 1939 (aged 79); Málaga
- Known for: Painting, watercolour

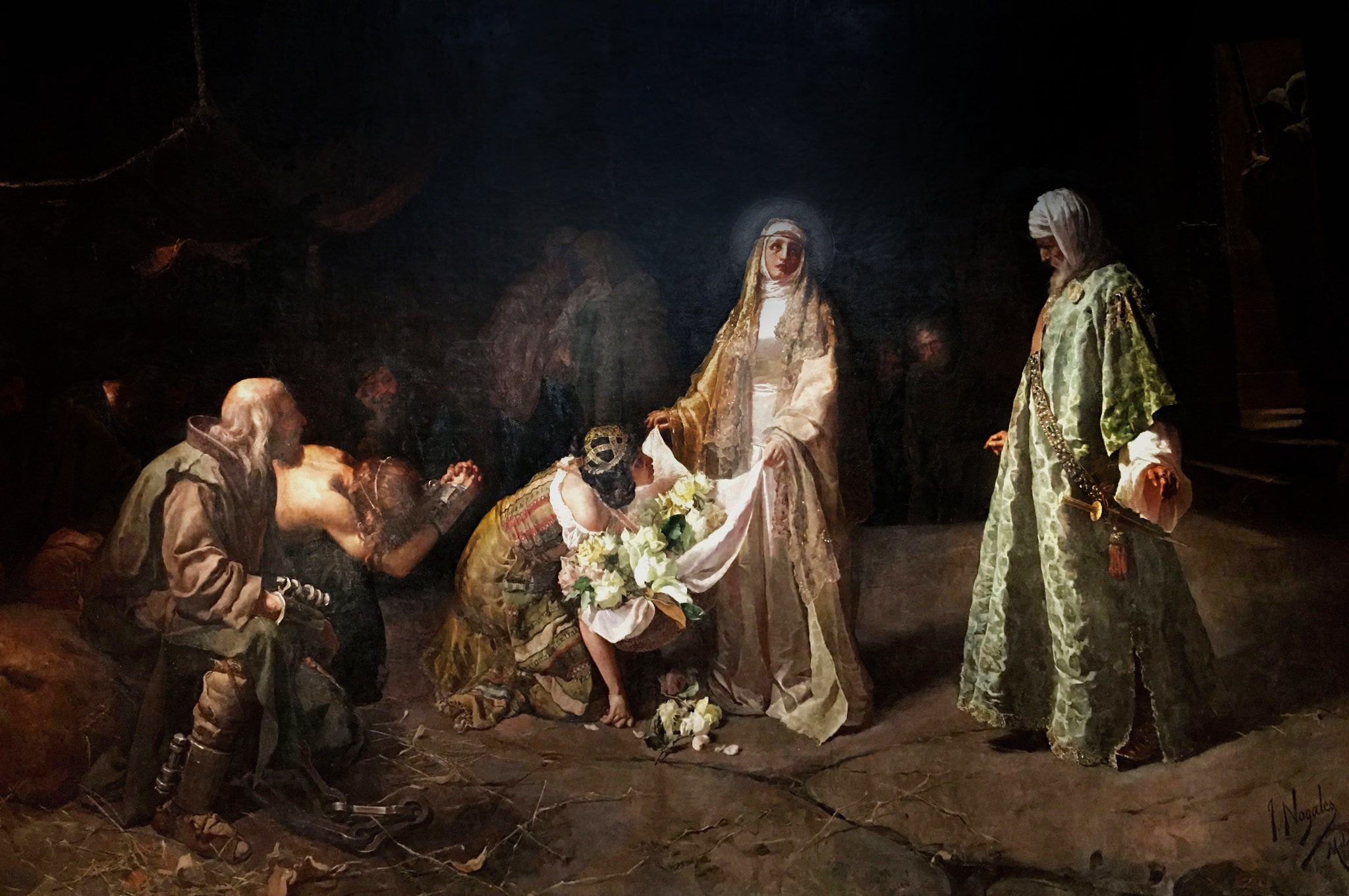
Saint Casilda (The Miracle of the Roses)

José Valentín Nogales y Sevilla (3 November 1860, Málaga - 28 November 1939, Málaga) was a Spanish painter and watercolorist, associated with the Málaga School of Painting. He specialized in landscapes and scenes that involved flowers.

== Biography ==
He was born to a working-class family and, at the age of eighteen, had to take a job as an assistant in the local railway office rather than pursue his education.

During this time, he attended night classes in drawing at the Academy of Fine Arts in San Telmo, taught by Bernardo Ferrándiz, who noted his exceptional abilities with watercolors. In 1888, he became a teaching assistant there, and was later promoted to full teacher; primarily of artistic drawing.

After that, he was named a Professor at the Elementary School of Industry and Fine Arts. Between 1902 and 1903, he temporarily served as Director there, and made the acquaintance of Antonio Muñoz Degrain, who had a significant influence on his mature style. Degrain also urged him to move to Madrid, on several occasions, but he chose to remain in his hometown.

Among his many activities, he was a corresponding academic of the Real Academia de Bellas Artes de San Fernando and, after 1910, an honorary Academician at san Telmo. He also served on the Provincial Commission of Artistic Monuments.

He was a frequent participant in exhibitions and contests, both regional and national. In 1884 and 1887, he was awarded Second Class prizes for his landscapes, at the National Exhibition of Fine Arts, followed by a Third Class prize in 1890. He achieved the First Class prize in 1892 with his portrayal of Saint Casilda; a work that was commissioned by a local banker who had a daughter named Casilda. In 1904, he was given an honorable mention. He was also awarded gold medals at the Vatican Exhibition of 1888 and the Exposición Internacional of 1892, held in Madrid.

A large number of Nogales's works are on display in the Museo de Málaga.

== Sources ==
- José Nogales, Exhibition catalog, Málaga, Caja de Ahorros Provincial, Obra Cultural, 1972
- José Miguel Morales Folguera (1975). José Nogales Sevilla. Caja de Ahorros Provincial. ISBN 978-84-500-6862-7.
- Teresa Sauret Guerrero, El siglo XIX en la pintura malagueña, doctoral thesis, University of Málaga, 1987, pp. 720-723.
- "José Nogales Sevilla". Real Academia de la Historia.
