= Monastery of Santa Clara-a-Nova =

Religious building in Coimbra, Portugal

Coordinates: 40.2034°N 8.4362°W

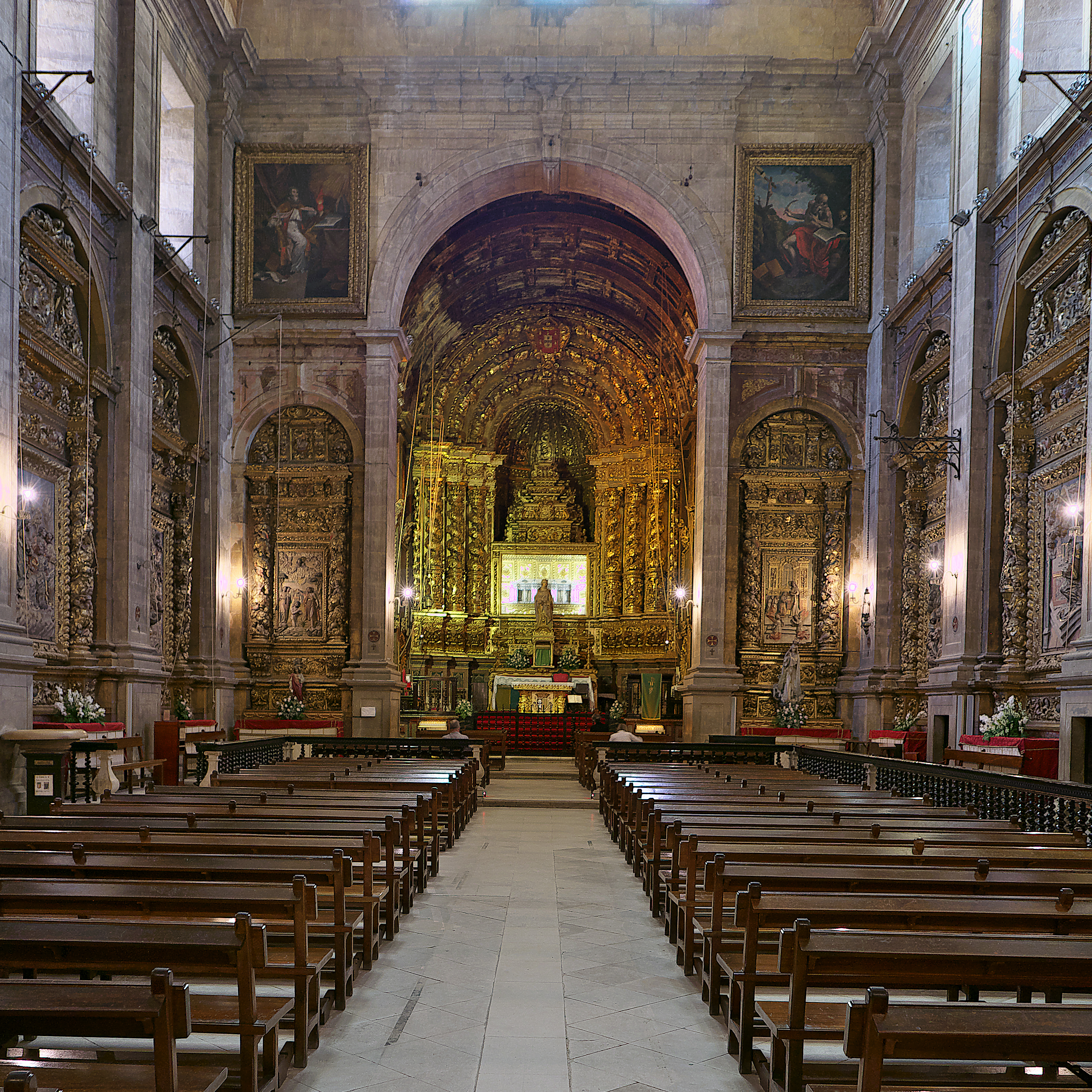
The Convent's main altar.

The Monastery of Santa Clara-a-Nova (Portuguese: Mosteiro de Santa Clara-a-Nova) is a monastery in Coimbra, Portugal. It was built to replace the mediaeval Monastery of Santa Clara-a-Velha, located nearby, which at the time was prone to frequent flooding by the waters of the Mondego river. The monastery, 25 meters high in interior and spire of 30m at exterior roof crux, was built in the 17th and 18th centuries and is classified as a National Monument. It is located in the Santa Clara parish.

== History ==
The Monastery of Santa Clara of Coimbra was founded in the early 14th century near the river Mondego by Queen Elizabeth of Portugal, wife of King Dinis I. The queen was greatly admired during and after her life for her pious and generous nature, and was canonised in the 17th century.

Through the centuries, the church and monastic buildings were repeatedly flooded by the Mondego. In the 17th century, under the rule of King John IV, it was decided that a new monastery was to be built for the religious community. Construction works began in 1649, and the church was finished by 1696. All nuns as well as the Gothic tombs of Queen Elizabeth and other royal princesses were transferred to the new monastery, therefore called "Santa Clara-a-Nova" (Saint Clare-the-New).

== Architecture ==
The project of the monastery was entrusted to Father João Turriano, a benedictine monk and royal engineer, who conceived the ensemble in the simple Mannerist style of 17th-century Portugal. Construction works were led by royal architect Mateus do Couto. The church, consecrated in 1696, is of rectangular floorplan, has a single-aisled nave and lacks a transept. The interior is illuminated by a series of (clerestory) windows located on the second storey of the nave.

The side chapels and main chapel house a total of 14 altarpieces of gilt carved woodwork (talha dourada) in late 17th-century style. The main altarpiece, in particular, is an outstanding example of the so-called "national" style (estilo nacional). This altarpiece incorporates the tomb of the Saint Queen Elizabeth, founder of the monastery, made of silver and crystal, entrusted in 1614 to the artists Domingos Lopes and Manuel Moreira. The statue of Queen Saint Elizabeth is a 19th-century work by sculptor António Teixeira Lopes.

The main portal to the church, decorated with the royal coat of arms held by two angels, is located at the south façade, as was typical for convents of religious sisters in Portugal. The gate of the convent is a late Baroque work of 1761 attributed to Hungarian architect Carlos Mardel. Mardel is also credited with the design of at least part of the two-storey cloisters of the convent, a masterpiece of Portuguese Baroque architecture.
