= Santa Clara e Castelo Viegas =

- Civil parish
- Location in Portugal
- Coordinates: 40.200°N 8.440°W
- Country: Portugal
- Region: Centro
- Intermunic. comm.: Região de Coimbra
- District: Coimbra
- Municipality: Coimbra

Area
  - Total: 17.63 km^{2} (6.81 sq mi)

Population (2011)
  - Total: 11,624
  - Density: 660/km^{2} (1,700/sq mi)
- Time zone: UTC+00:00 (WET)
  - Summer (DST): UTC+01:00 (WEST)

Santa Clara e Castelo Viegas is a civil parish in the municipality of Coimbra, Portugal. It was formed in 2013 by the merger of the former parishes Santa Clara and Castelo Viegas. The population in 2011 was 11,624, in an area of 17.63 km².
