= Monastery of Santa Clara-a-Velha =

Former convent in Coimbra, Portugal

Coordinates: 40°12′09.92″N 8°26′00.38″W

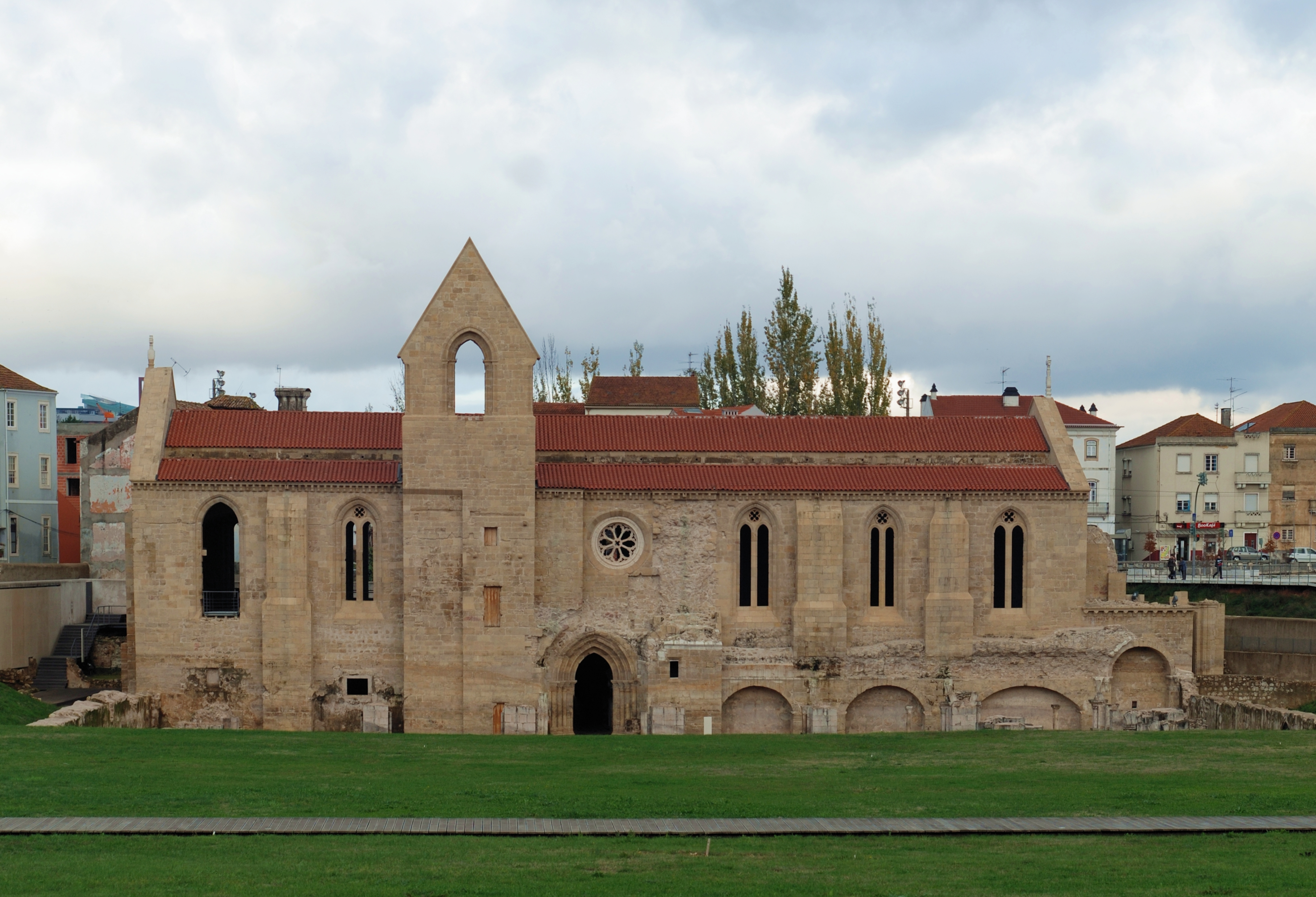
View of the church

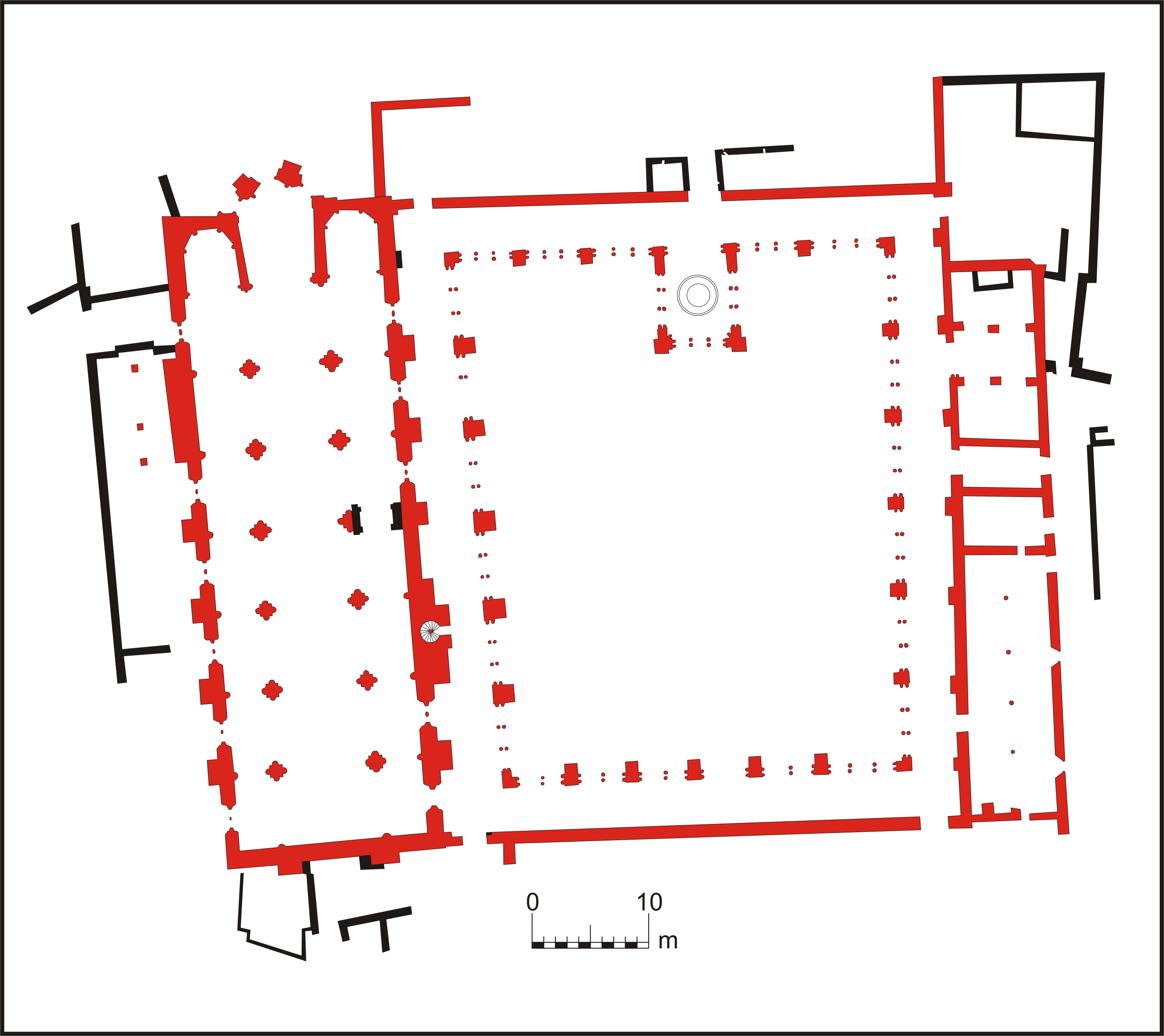
Plan

The ruins of the Monastery of Santa Clara-a-Velha (Old St. Clare) are located in the city of Coimbra, in Portugal. The monastery was built in the 14th century on the left bank of the Mondego River, but had to be abandoned in the 17th century due to frequent floods. The well-preserved Gothic ruins of the monastery were excavated and conserved in the late 20th century, more than 300 years after being abandoned by the nuns.

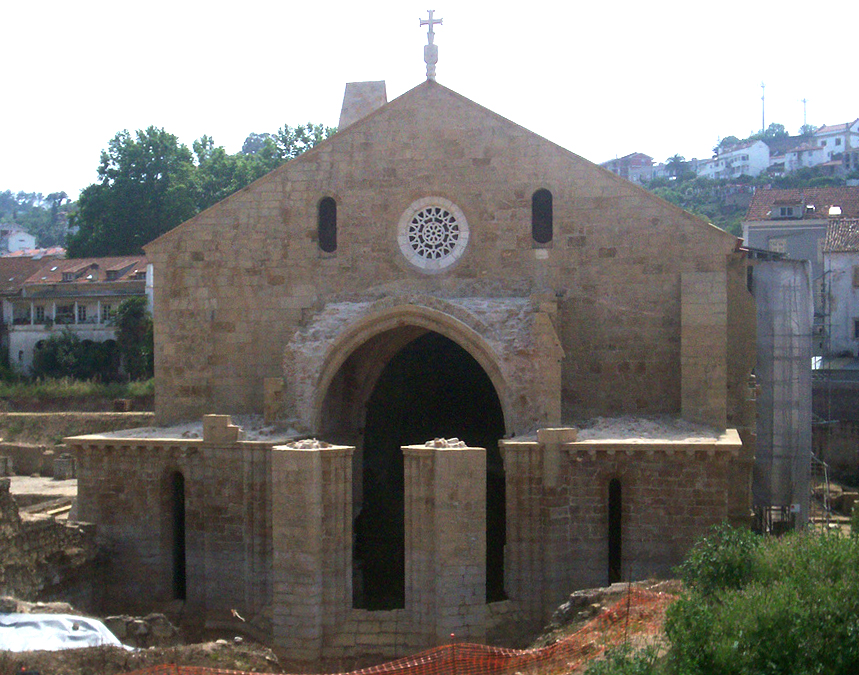
Ruined Eastern apse of the church of the Monastery of Santa Clara-a-Velha. The main chapel in the middle of the façade lost its stone roof

== History ==
=== Middle Ages ===
The Monastery of Santa Clara of Coimbra was founded in the 1280s by Mor Dias as a house of the Order of the Poor Clares. This early monastery was dissolved in 1311, but in 1314 it was refounded by Queen Elizabeth, wife of King Denis of Portugal. Elizabeth was admired for her pious and charitable nature, and her devotion led to her canonisation in 1626. The palace of the Queen, of which only ruins remain, was located near the monastery.

The works sponsored by the Queen started in 1316 on the same spot of the previous foundation and gave rise to the ensemble that exists today. The first architect associated with the monastery was Domingos Domingues, who had worked on the cloisters of the Monastery of Alcobaça. His work was continued after 1326 by Estêvão Domingues, who had worked on the cloisters of Lisbon Cathedral. The church was consecrated in 1330 and shows the influence of the Alcobaça building in its floorplan and many other architectural details. Elizabeth died in 1336 and was buried in the monastery in an impressive Gothic tomb. A large cloister was built to the south side of the church within the same 14th century.

Already in 1331 the monastery and church had been flooded by the nearby Mondego River. The site of the foundation proved to be unsuitable, as the monastery was repeatedly invaded by the waters of the river in the following centuries. The nuns of the monastery responded by elevating the floor levels of the monastic buildings to reduce the damage caused by the floods. In spite of the problems, the monastery was frequently enriched by donations. In the early 16th century, under King Manuel I, the church was decorated with Sevillian tiles and several painted altarpieces.

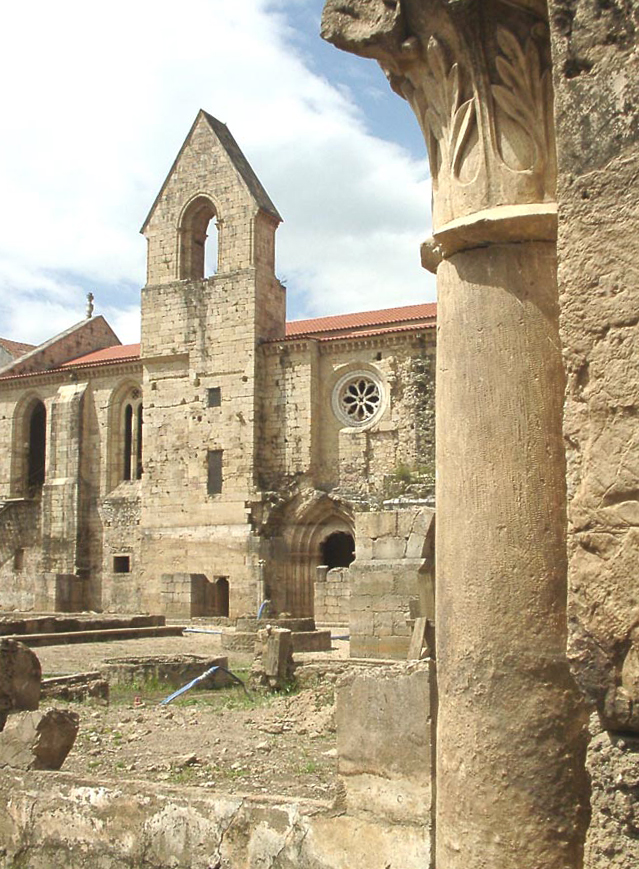
View of the ruined cloisters and South façade of the church with rose window and bell tower.

=== Decay and rescue ===
Around 1612, as the river flooded the monastery every year, the nuns built an elevated pavement in the church halfway to the roof. Finally, in 1647, as the frequent floods made life in the monastery impossible, King John IV ordered the nuns to abandon the structure. The last nuns left the ensemble in 1677, as a new monastery, called Monastery of Santa Clara-a-Nova (New St. Clare) was built on a hill nearby. The Gothic tombs of Queen Isabel and other royal princesses were transferred to the new building.

As the centuries passed, the old monastery fell into ruin and became partially covered by the marshes of the Mondego River. Its historical and architectural importance led to it being declared a National Monument in 1910, and some conservation works were done in the first half of the 20th century. After 1995, a large archaeological campaign led by the Instituto Português do Património Arquitectónico cleared the mud and water from the ruins, which were found to be in a remarkably good state of preservation. The excavations allowed for the recovery of a large number of architectural and decorative fragments and a better understanding of the monastery plan. In 2006 the building of an interpretation centre and new tours were estimated at 27 million euro and the project completed in April 2009.

== Art and architecture ==
=== Ruins ===
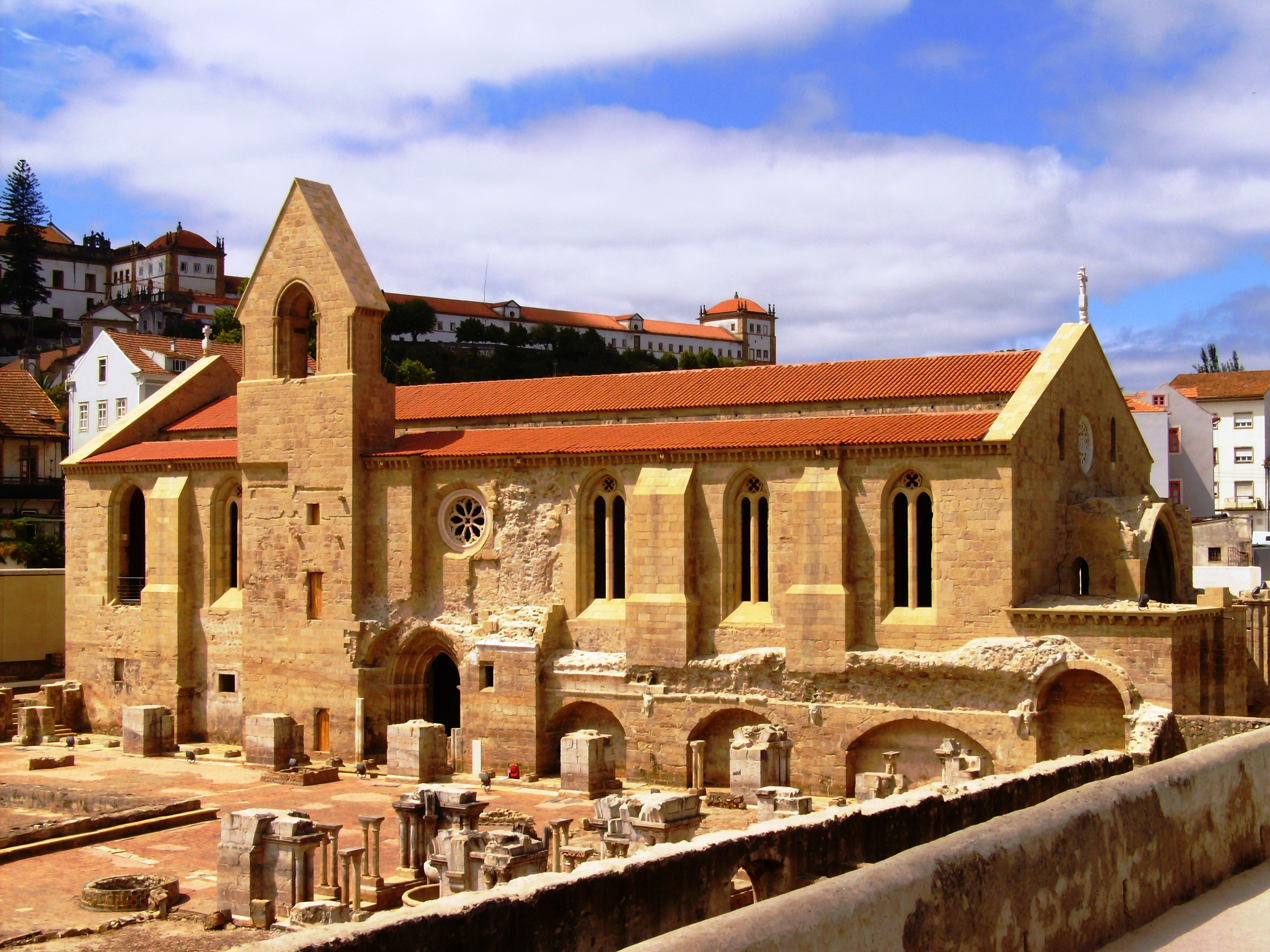
Saint-Clara-a-Velha monastery, Coimbra

The floorplan of the church of the Monastery of Santa Clara reveals the influence of the Monastery of Alcobaça. The church nave has a nave and two aisles and is fully covered with stone vaulting, something rare in mendicant monastic foundations in Portugal, which usually used wooden roofs over the nave. Another influence of Alcobaça is seen in the vault types: pointed barrel vault in the nave and groin vault in the side aisles. The structure of the columns of the nave also resembles Alcobaça. The nave is illuminated by tall mullioned windows of Gothic design and three rose windows. Unlike Alcobaça, the church of Santa Clara lacks a prominent transept.

The nave used to be divided in two parts, one of public access and the other reserved for the nuns, separated by a dividing wall. An elevated choir, now lost, used to house Queen Isabel's tomb. The apse of the church has three chapels of polygonal shape, the central chapel being the largest. The central chapel has lost its stone roof and used to be illuminated by three windows.

A portal on the South façade of the church connects it with the cloister ruins, which have been preserved up to the level of the double columns of the arches. The capitals are decorated with vegetable motifs. Also visible are the remains of a Gothic fountain with a circular basin.

The excavations also revealed the foundations of the chapter house, refectory, a smaller cloister and the old palace of Queen Elizabeth.

=== Artwork ===
During the centuries the monastery and church were decorated with religious works of art that are now dispersed. The Monastery of Santa Clara-a-Nova, to which the nuns were relocated in the 17th century, houses three Gothic tombs which were also relocated from Santa Clara-a-Velha, including that of Queen Isabel. Her tomb, dated from circa 1330, displays her full-size recumbent figure over the lid and is by Aragonese sculptor Mestre Pero.

Many works of art of the monastery are now in the Machado de Castro Museum in Coimbra. Painted altarpieces include a triptych of circa 1486 about the life of Clare of Assisi and a painted triptych commissioned to Flemish painter Quentin Metsys in 1517 . Others pieces of sculpture and metalwork in the museum testify to the wealth and prestige of the monastery.

== See also ==
- Monastery of Santa Clara
