= Elizabeth of Portugal =

Queen of Portugal from 1282 to 1325, Catholic saint

Elizabeth
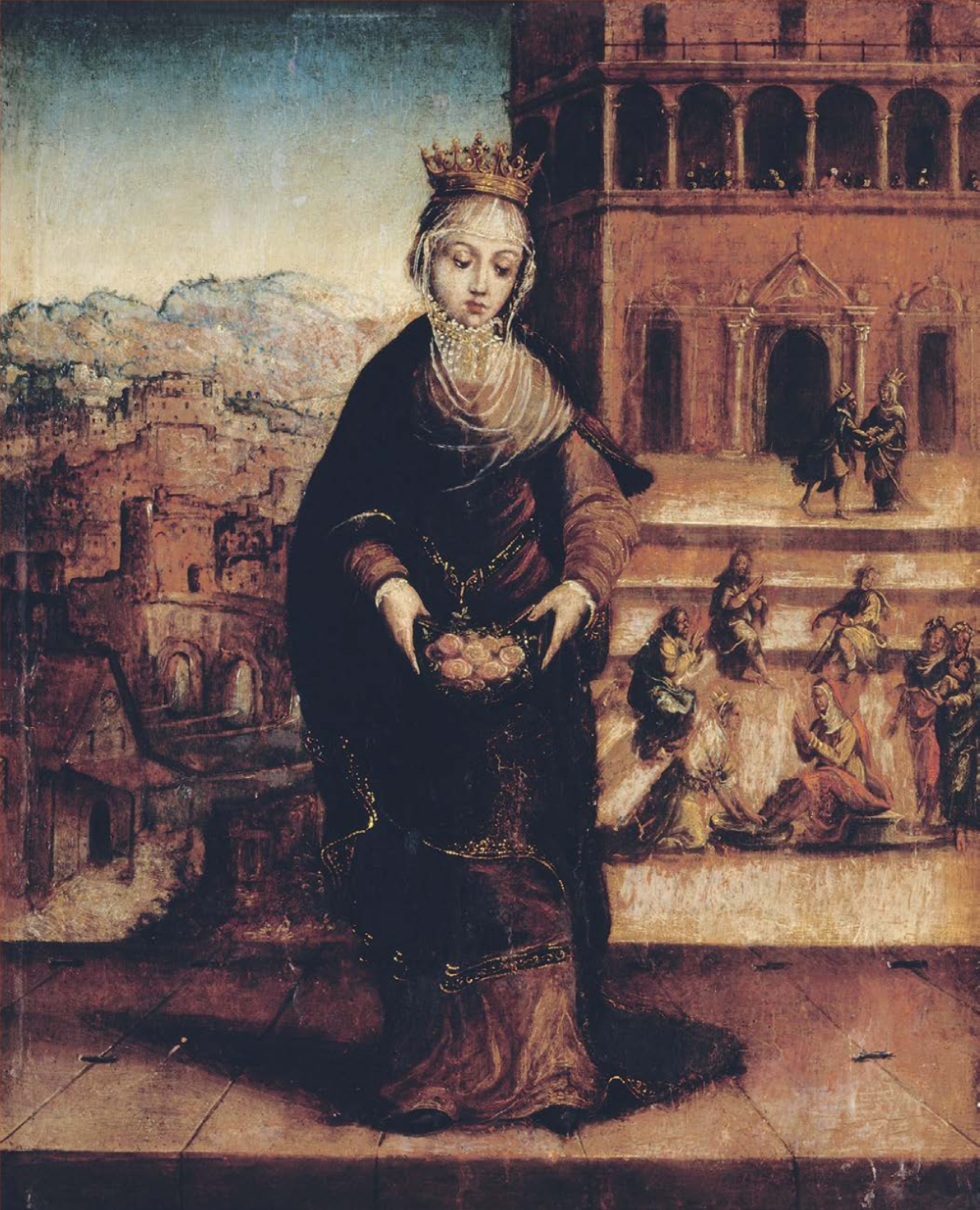
- Queen Saint Elizabeth and the Miracle of the Roses; c. 1540

Queen consort of Portugal
- Tenure: 26 June 1282 – 7 January 1325
- Born: 4 January 1271; Aljafería Palace, Zaragoza, Kingdom of Aragon
- Died: 4 July 1336 (aged 65); Castle of Estremoz, Alentejo, Kingdom of Portugal
- Burial: Convent of Santa Clara, Coimbra (until the 17th century); Monastery of Santa Clara-a-Nova (since the 17th century)
- Spouse: Denis, King of Portugal (m. 1282; died 1325)
- Issue: Constança, Queen of Castile; Afonso IV, King of Portugal
- House: House of Barcelona
- Father: Peter III of Aragon
- Mother: Constance II of Sicily
- Religion: Roman Catholic

Elizabeth of Portugal, TOSF (Elisabet in Catalan, Isabel in Aragonese, Portuguese and Spanish; 4 January 1271 – 4 July 1336), also known as Elizabeth of Aragon, was Queen of Portugal from 1282 to 1325 as the wife of King Denis. She is venerated as a saint in the Catholic Church, under the name Saint Elizabeth of Portugal or Queen Saint Elizabeth (Portuguese: Rainha Santa Isabel). She was a member of the Third Order of Saint Francis.

== Family and early life ==
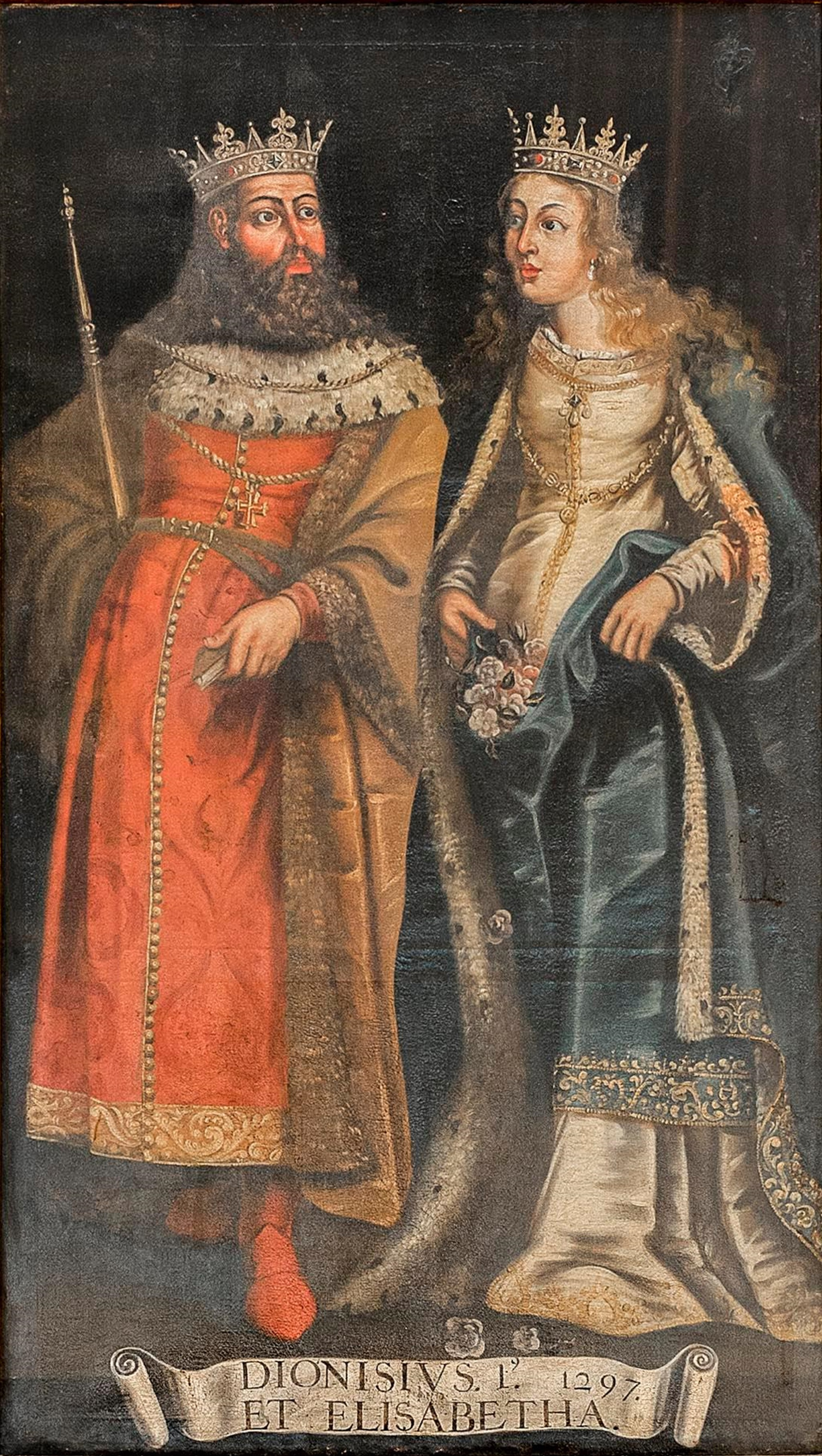
King Denis of Portugal, the Farmer King, and Queen Elizabeth of Portugal

Born in 1271 into the royal house of Aragon, Elizabeth was the daughter of Infante Peter and his wife Constance of Sicily (later King Peter III of Aragón and Queen Constance II of Sicily, and the sister of three kings: Alfonso III and James II of Aragon and Frederick III of Sicily.

She was a great-niece and namesake of Elizabeth of Hungary, the original source of the miracle of the roses, often depicted in art. Like her great-aunt, she became a member of the Third Order of Saint Francis.

Elizabeth was educated very piously, and led a life of strict regularity from her childhood: she said the full Divine Office daily, fasted and did other penances.

== Marriage ==
Elizabeth's marriage to King Denis of Portugal was arranged in 1282 when she was 11 years old, receiving the towns of Óbidos, Abrantes and Porto de Mós as part of her dowry. It was only in 1288 that the wedding was celebrated, when Denis was 26 years old, while Elizabeth was 17. Denis, a poet and statesman, was known as the Farmer King, because he planted a large pine forest near Leiria to prevent the soil degradation that threatened the region.

Elizabeth quietly pursued the regular religious practices of her youth and was devoted to the poor and sick. Such a life was taken as a reproach to many around her and caused ill will in some quarters. Eventually, her prayer and patience succeeded in converting her husband, who had been leading a sinful life of adultery.

Elizabeth took an active interest in Portuguese politics and was a decisive conciliator during the negotiations concerning the Treaty of Alcañices, signed by Denis and Fernando IV of Castile in 1297 (which fixed the borders between the two countries). In 1304, the Queen and Denis returned to Spain to arbitrate between Fernando IV of Castile and James II of Aragon, brother of Elizabeth.

She had two children, a daughter named Constance, who married King Ferdinand IV of Castile and a son named Afonso (who later became King Afonso IV of Portugal).

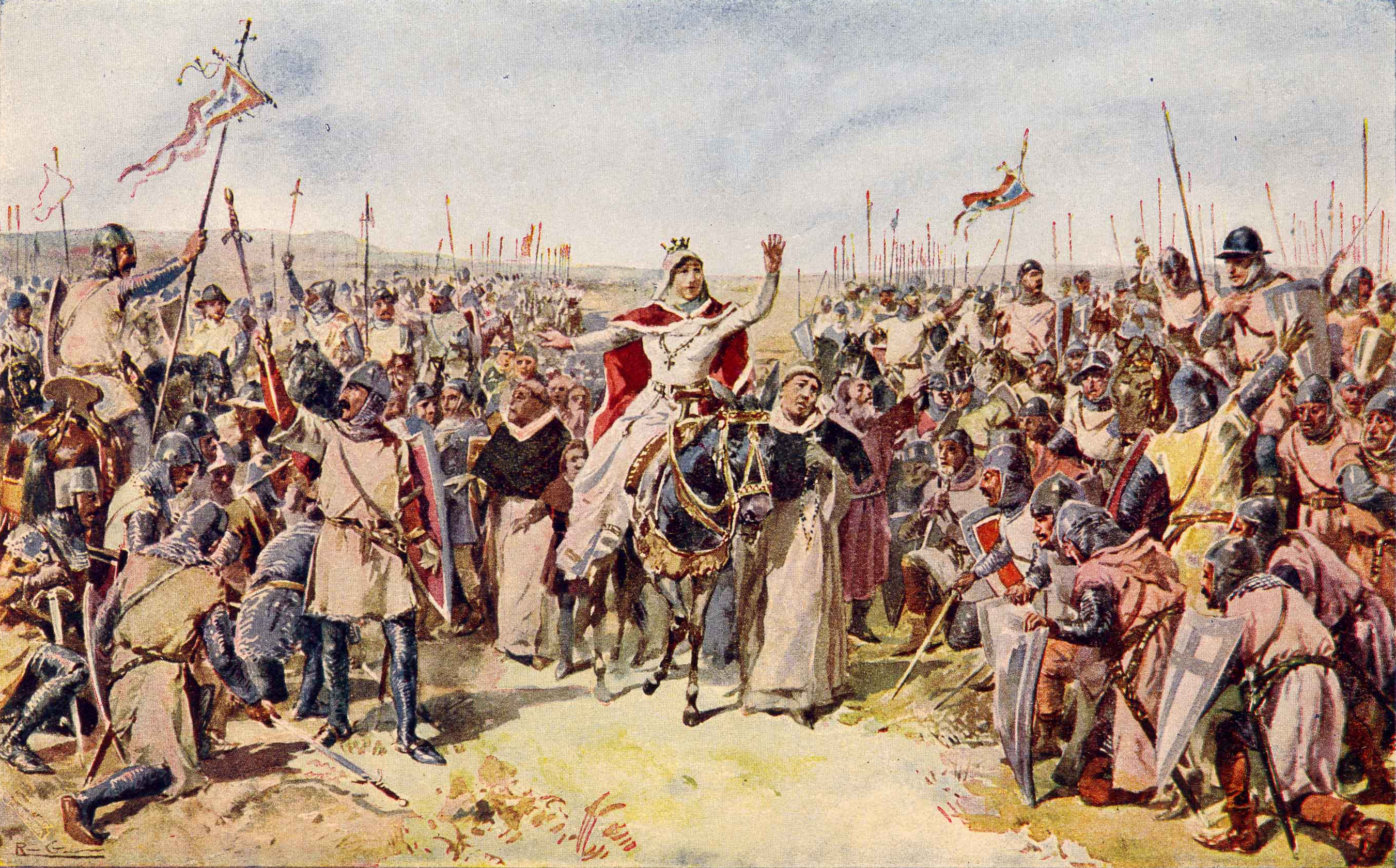
Queen Elizabeth, mounted on a mule, prevents a civil war in 1323, on the field of Alvalade

Elizabeth would serve as intermediary between her husband and Afonso, during the Civil War between 1322 and 1324. The Infante greatly resented the king, whom he accused of favoring the king's illegitimate son, Afonso Sanches. Denis was prevented from killing his son through the intervention of the Queen, when she, in 1323, mounted on a mule, positioned herself between both opposing armies on the field of Alvalade in order to prevent the combat. Peace returned in 1324, once the illegitimate son was sent into exile, and the Infante swore loyalty to the king.

== Dowager Queen ==
After Denis' death in 1325, Elizabeth retired to the monastery of the Poor Clare nuns, now known as the Monastery of Santa Clara-a-Velha (which she had founded in 1314) in Coimbra. She joined the Third Order of St. Francis, devoting the rest of her life to the poor and sick in obscurity. During the great famine in 1293, she donated flour from her cellars to the starving in Coimbra. She was also known for being modest in her dress and humble in conversation, for providing lodging for pilgrims, distributing small gifts, paying the dowries of poor girls, and educating the children of poor nobles. She was a benefactor of various hospitals (Coimbra, Santarém and Leiria) and of religious projects (such as the Trinity Convent in Lisbon, chapels in Leiria and Óbidos, and the cloister in Alcobaça).

She was called to act once more as a peacemaker in 1336, when Afonso IV marched his troops against King Alfonso XI of Castile, his nephew, to whom he had married his daughter Maria, and who had neglected and ill-treated her. In spite of age and weakness, the Queen-dowager insisted on hurrying to Estremoz, where the two kings' armies were drawn up. She again stopped the fighting and caused terms of peace to be arranged. But the exertion brought on her final illness. As soon as her mission was completed, she took to her bed with a fever from which she died on 4 July, in the castle of Estremoz. She earned the title of Peacemaker on account of her efficacy in solving disputes.

Although Denis' tomb was located in Odivelas, Elizabeth was buried in the Convent of Santa Clara in Coimbra, in a magnificent Gothic sarcophagus. After frequent flooding by the Mondego River in the 17th century, the Poor Clares moved her mortal remains to the Monastery of Santa Clara-a-Nova (also in Coimbra). Her body was transferred to the main chapel, where it was buried in a sarcophagus of silver and crystal.

== Sainthood ==
Saint Elizabeth of Portugal T.O.S.F.
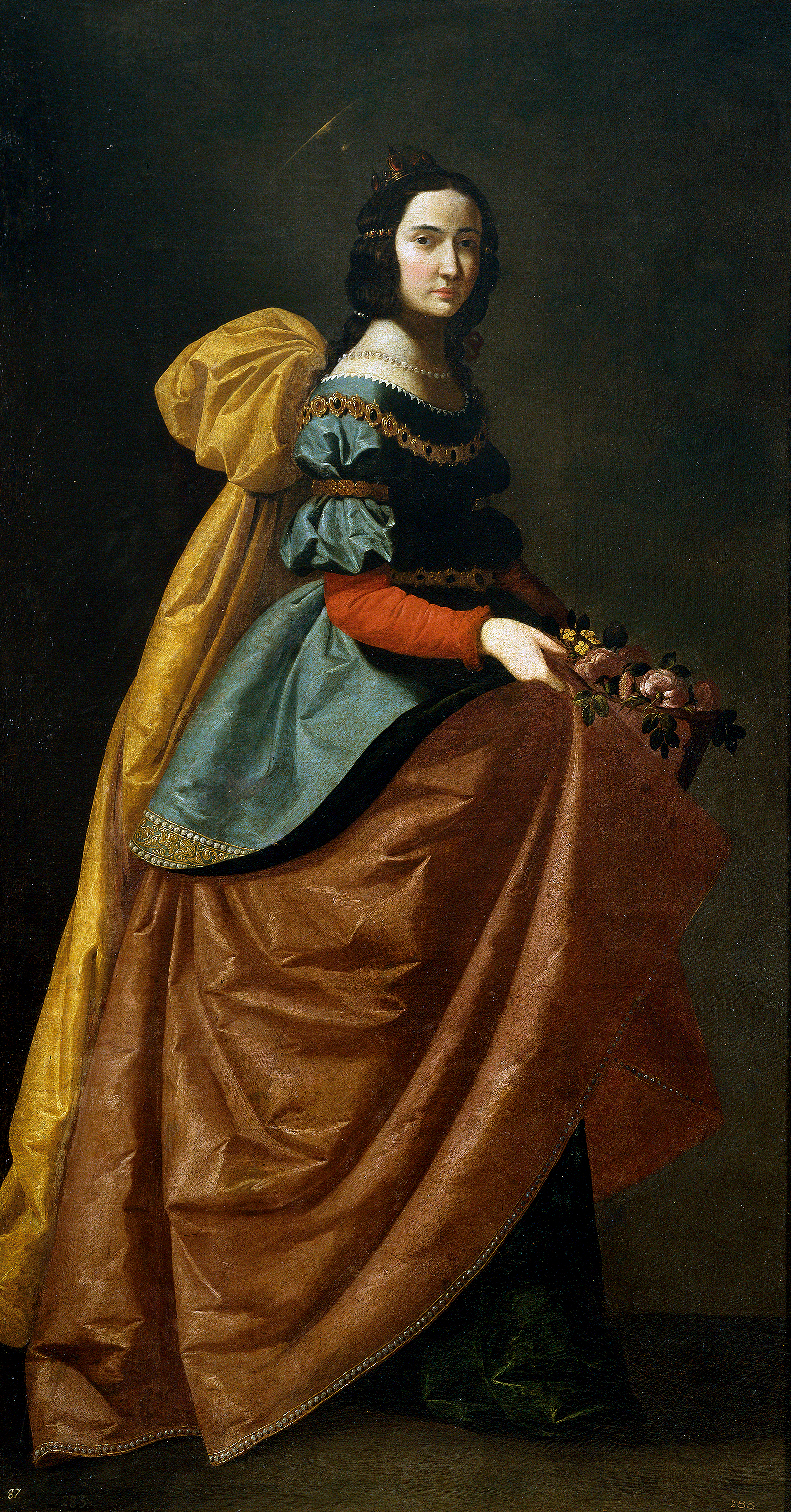
- Portrait by Francisco de Zurbarán, c. 1640

Widow, Those who work for the Underprivileged
- Born: Elisabet d'Aragó
- Resting place: Originally in Monastery of Santa Clara-a-Vellha, later transferred to Monastery of Santa Clara-a-Nova, Coimbra
- Honored in: Catholic Church
- Beatified: 1516, Papal States, by Pope Leo X
- Canonized: 24 June 1626, Papal States, by Pope Urban VIII
- Major shrine: Monastery of Santa Clara-a-Nova, Coimbra
- Feast: 4 July; 5 July (United States), 8 July for Tridentine Rite
- Attributes: Olive Branch, Dove, holding a bunch of roses
- Patronage: Peacemakers, Women disrespected by their husbands, Diocese of San Cristóbal de La Laguna
- Major works: miracle of the roses

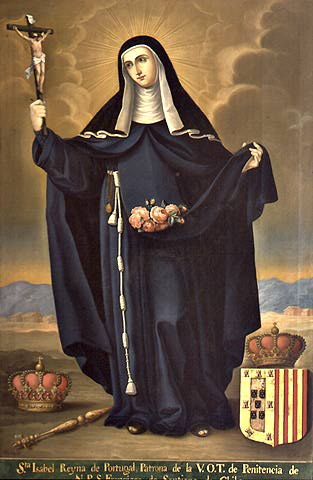
Portrait by José Gil de Castro

She was beatified in 1516 and canonized by Pope Urban VIII on 24 June 1626. Her feast was then inserted into the General Roman Calendar for celebration on 4 July. In 1694 Pope Innocent XII moved her feast to 8 July, so it would not conflict with the celebration of the Octave of Saints Peter and Paul, Apostles. In 1955, Pope Pius XII abolished this octave. The 1962 Roman Missal changed the rank of the feast from "Double" to "Third-Class Feast". The 1969 revision of the Calendar classified the celebration as an optional memorial and restored it to 4 July. Her feast is also kept on the Franciscan Calendar of Saints. Since the establishment in 1819 of the Diocese of San Cristóbal de La Laguna (Canary Islands), Spain. Elizabeth is the co-patron of the diocese and of its cathedral pursuant to the papal bull issued by Pope Pius VII. In the United States her memorial has been transferred to 5 July since 4 July is the date of the independence of that nation, a national holiday.

Elizabeth is often depicted in royal garb with a dove or an olive branch, usually holding a bunch of roses in her skirt or in the scapular of her religious habit.

== Legacy ==
Elizabeth was the original namesake of Santa Isabela Island in Ecuador's Galapagos Islands, although this was later amended to Isabela Island on the quadricentennial of Columbus's first voyage, changing its eponym to Isabella I of Castile.

She was the subject of a 1947 Portuguese-Spanish film, The Holy Queen, in which she was played by Maruchi Fresno. In Portuguese popular culture, she is commonly associated with a "miracle of the roses". The young adult historical fantasy novel A Curse of Roses by Portuguese author Diana Pinguicha retells her story as a princess who can turn food into flowers and falls for an Enchanted Moura.

The St. Elizabeth Catholic Church in Richmond, Greater London, was named in honor of the 14th-century queen consort of Portugal. The present building dates from 1824.

== Bibliography ==
- "Saint Elizabeth, Queen of Portugal", Butler's Lives of the Saints
- Ferreira, João (2010). Histórias Rocambolescas da História de Portugal [Fantastic Stories of the History of Portugal] (in Portuguese) (6 ed.). Lisbon, Portugal: A Esfera dos Livros. ISBN 978-989-626-216-7.
- Hoever, Hugo H., ed. (1955). Lives of the Saints, For Every Day of the Year. New York, New York: Catholic Book Publishing Co. p. 511. OCLC 10070602.
- Rodrigues Oliveira, Ana (2010). "Isabel de Aragão (1270–1336). A Rainha Santa". Rainhas medievais de Portugal. Dezassete mulheres, duas dinastias, quatro séculos de História [Medieval Queens of Portugal: Seventeen women, two dynasties, four centuries of history] (in Portuguese). Lisbon: A esfera dos livros. ISBN 978-989-626-261-7.
- Previte-Orton, C.W. (1960). The Shorter Cambridge Medieval History. Vol. II: The twelfth century to the Renaissance. Cambridge at the University Press. p. 825.

Royal titles
| Preceded by Beatrice of Castile | Queen consort of Portugal; 1282–1325 | Succeeded by Beatrice of Castile |
