= Flavio (given name) =

Flavio (Italian: [ˈflaːvjo], Spanish: [ˈflaβjo]) is an Italian, Spanish and Portuguese masculine given name, equivalent to Flavius in Latin, Flavi in Catalan, and Flávio in Portuguese.

Notable people with the name include:

- Flavio Alfaro (1961–2021), American baseball player
- Flavio Alonso (born 1968), Spanish rally driver
- Flavio Alves (born 1969), Brazilian film producer, director, and screenwriter
- Flavio Ambrosetti (1919–2012), Swiss jazz musician and engineer
- Flavio Anastasia (born 1969), Italian cyclist
- Flavio Aquilone (born 1990), Italian voice actor
- Flavio Asta (born 1946), Italian shot putter and discus thrower
- Flavio Azzaro, Argentine sports journalist and broadcaster
- Flavio Baracchini (1895–1928), Italian World War I fighter ace
- Flavio Becca (born 1962), Luxembourgish real estate investor
- Flavio Behring (born 1937), Brazilian jiu-jitsu practitioner
- Flavio Bertelli (1865–1941), Italian painter
- Flavio Bianchi (born 2000), Italian footballer
- Flavio Biondo (1392–1463), Italian humanist and historian
- Flavio Bolsonaro (born 1981), Brazilian politician
- Flavio Boltro (born 1961), Italian trumpet and flugelhorn jazz player
- Flavio Bravo, American politician
- Flavio Briatore (1950), Italian businessman
- Flavio Bucci (1947–2020), Italian actor
- Flavio Caballero (born 1958), Venezuelan actor
- Flavio Cafiero (born 1971), Brazilian writer
- Flavio Caicedo (born 1988), Ecuadorian footballer
- Flavio Calzavara (1900–1981), Italian film director and screenwriter
- Flavio Cannone (born 1981), Italian trampoline gymnast
- Flavio Roberto Carraro (1932–2022), Italian Roman Catholic prelate
- Flavio Cattaneo, Italian businessman
- Flavio Cavallini (born 1957), Italian Roman Catholic prelate and biblical theologian
- Flavio Chigi (1631–1693), Italian cardinal and librarian
- Flavio Chigi (1711–1771), Catholic cardinal
- Flavio Chigi (1810–1885), Italian Catholic cardinal
- Flavio Ciampichetti (born 1988), Argentine footballer
- Flavio Cianciarulo (born 1964), Argentine musician
- Flavio Cipolla (born 1983), Italian tennis coach and former player
- Flavio Ciuferri (born 2004), Italian footballer
- Flavio Cobolli (born 2002), Italian tennis player
- Flavio Colin, Brazilian comic artist and illustrator
- Flavio Córdoba (born 1984), Colombian footballer
- Flavio Costantini (1926–2013), Italian artist
- Flavio Cotti (1939–2020), Swiss politician
- Flavio Davino (born 1974), Mexican footballer
- Flavio Delbono (born 1959), Italian politician and economist
- Flavio Destro (born 1962), Italian footballer and manager
- Flavio Dino (born 1968), Brazilian attorney, politician and teacher
- Flavio Dos Santos Dias (born 1995), Cape Verdean footballer
- Flavio Emoli (1934–2015), Italian footballer
- Flavio Dario Espinal (born 1957), Dominican jurist, political scientist, diplomat and academic
- Flavio Faggioni (born 1981), Italian ice hockey player
- Flavio Gastaldi (born 1991), Italian politician
- Flavio de Giacomi (born 1950), Argentine field hockey player
- Flavio Giupponi (born 1964), Italian cyclist
- Flavio Giurato (born 1949), Italian singer-songwriter
- Flavio Grassi (born 1968), Italian sailor
- Flavio Herrera (1895–1968), Guatemalan writer and diplomat
- Flavio Insinna (born 1965), Italian actor and television presenter
- Flavio Ivanovic (born 1965), Argentine footballer
- Flavio Labiano (born 1962), Spanish cinematographer
- Flavio Lazzari (born 1986), Italian footballer
- Flavio de Luna (born 1990), Mexican cyclist
- Flavio Maestri (born 1973), Peruvian footballer
- Flavio Manzoni (born 1965), Italian architect and automobile designer
- Flavio Marazzi (born 1978), Swiss sailor
- Flavio Martini (born 1945), Italian cyclist
- Flavio Maspoli (1950–2007), Swiss politician
- Flavio Medina (born 1971), Mexican actor
- Flavio Micozzi (born 2000), Italian canoeist
- Flavio Mogherini (1922–1994), Italian production designer
- Flavio Montrucchio (born 1975), Italian actor
- Flavio Moya (born 2005), Chilean footballer
- Flavio Orlandi (1921–2009), Italian politician
- Flavio Orsini (1532–1581), Italian bishop and cardinal
- Flavio Ortega (1944-2007), Brazilian football player and manager
- Flavio Pace (born 1977), Italian Roman Catholic prelate
- Flavio Paoletti (born 2003), Italian footballer
- Flavio Pelliccioni (born 1956), Sammarinese windsurfer
- Flavio Perlaza (born 1952), Ecuadorian footballer
- Flavio Poli (1900–1984), Italian artist and designer
- Flavio Premoli (born 1949), Italian musician and composer
- Flavio Prendi (born 1995), Albanian footballer
- Flavio Quezada (born 1986), Chilean lawyer, academic and politician
- Flavio Raffo (born 1972), Italian footballer and manager
- Flavio Robatto (born 1974), Argentine footballer and manager
- Flavio Rogério (born 1976), Brazilian footballer
- Flavio Rojas (born 1994), Chilean footballer
- Flavio Roma (born 1974), Italian footballer
- Flavio Rota (born 1966), Swiss gymnast
- Flavio Sala (born 1983), Italian classical guitar player
- Flavio Salazar (born 1965), Chilean politician
- Flavio Santi, Italian writer, poet, and translator
- Flavio Méndez Santiago (born 1975), Mexican drug lord
- Flavio Santoro (born 2001), German-Italian footballer
- Flavio Santos (born 1987), Mexican footballer
- Flavio Scala (born 1945), Italian yacht racer
- Flavio Schmid (born 1980), Swiss footballer
- Flavio Emilio Scogna (born 1956), Italian composer
- Flavio Seholhe (born 1990), Mozambican runner
- Flavio Signore (born 1970), Italian film producer
- Flavio da Silva (born 1973), Brazilian footballer and manager
- Flavio Soares, Brazilian comics artist
- Flavio Soriga (born 1975), Italian writer
- Flavio Sosa (born 1964), Mexican politician
- Flavio Tattarini (born 1943), Italian politician
- Flavio Tenius (born 1970), Brazilian footballer
- Flavio Testi (1923–2014), Italian composer
- Flavio Torti (died 1622), Italian lawyer and writer
- Flavio Tosi (born 1969), Italian politician
- Flavio Tosi (American football) (1912–1994), American football player
- Flavio Vanzella (born 1964), Italian cyclist
- Flavio Romero de Velasco (1925–2016), Mexican politician and lawyer
- Flavio Villavicencio (born 1964), Cuban weightlifter
- Flavio Zandoná (born 1967), Argentine footballer
- Flavio Zanonato (born 1950), Italian politician
- Flavio Zveiter (born 1981), Brazilian lawyer and professor

== See also ==
- Flavio (disambiguation)
