= Paulus Castrensis =

Italian jurist

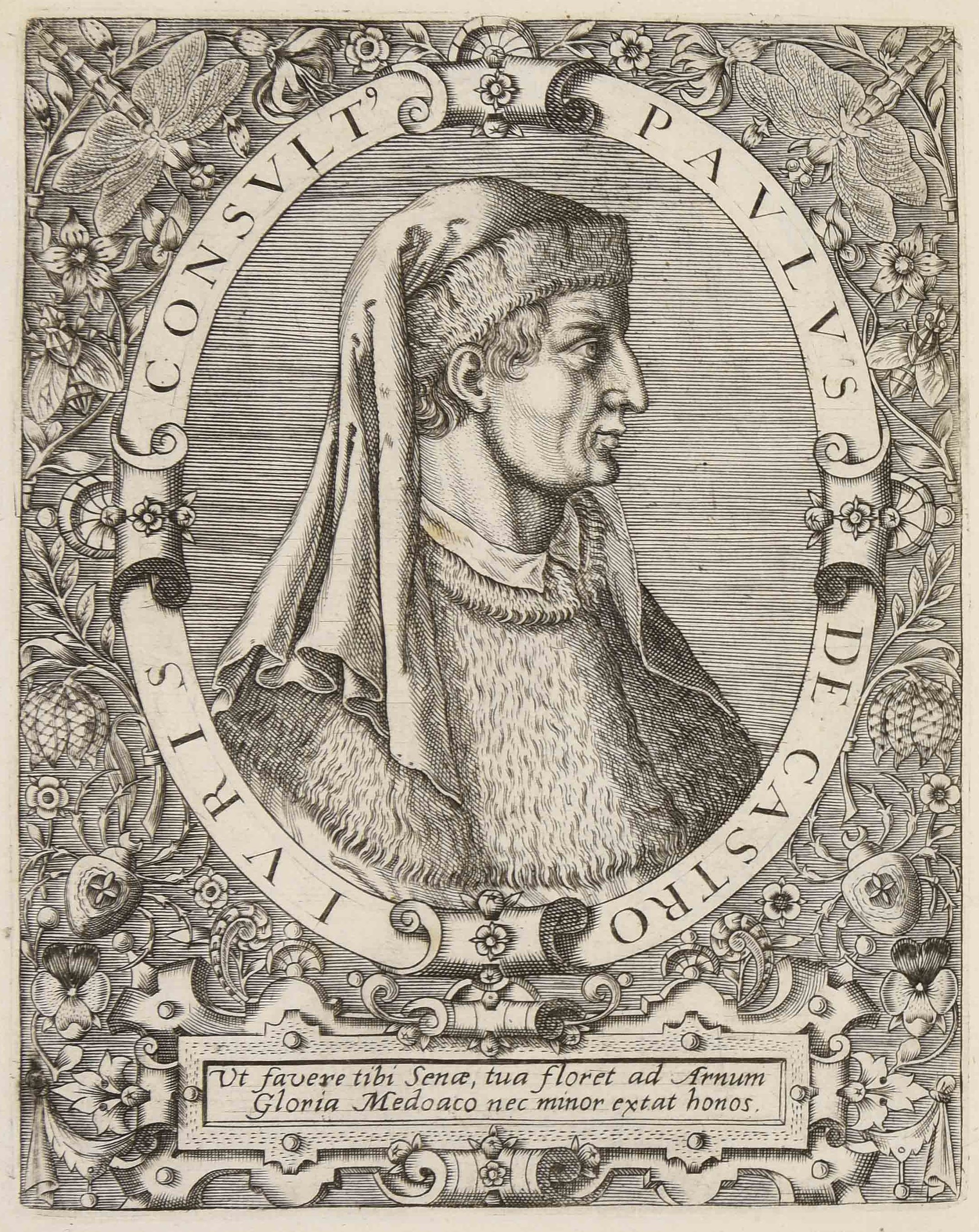
Paolo di Castro

Paulus Castrensis was an Italian jurist of the 14th century.

== Life ==
He studied under Baldus de Ubaldis at Perugia, and was a fellow-pupil with Cardinal de Zabarella. He was admitted to the degree of doctor of civil law in the University of Avignon, but it is uncertain when he first undertook the duties of a professor. A tradition, which has been handed down by Panzirolus, represents him as having taught law for a period of fifty-seven years. He was professor at Siena in 1390, at Avignon in 1394, and at Padua in 1429; and, at different periods, at Florence, at Bologna and at Perugia. He was for some time the vicar-general of Cardinal Zabarella at Florence, and his eminence as a teacher of Canon law may be inferred from the appraisal of one of his pupils, who styles him famosissimus juris utriusque monarca.

His most complete treatise is his readings on the Digest, and it appears from a passage in his readings on the Digestum Vetus that he delivered them at a time when he had been actively engaged for forty-five years as a teacher of civil law. His death is generally assigned to 1436, but it appears from an entry in a manuscript of the Digestum Vetus, which is extant at Munich, made by the hand of one of his pupils who styles him præceptor meus, that he died on 20 July 1441.

== Works ==
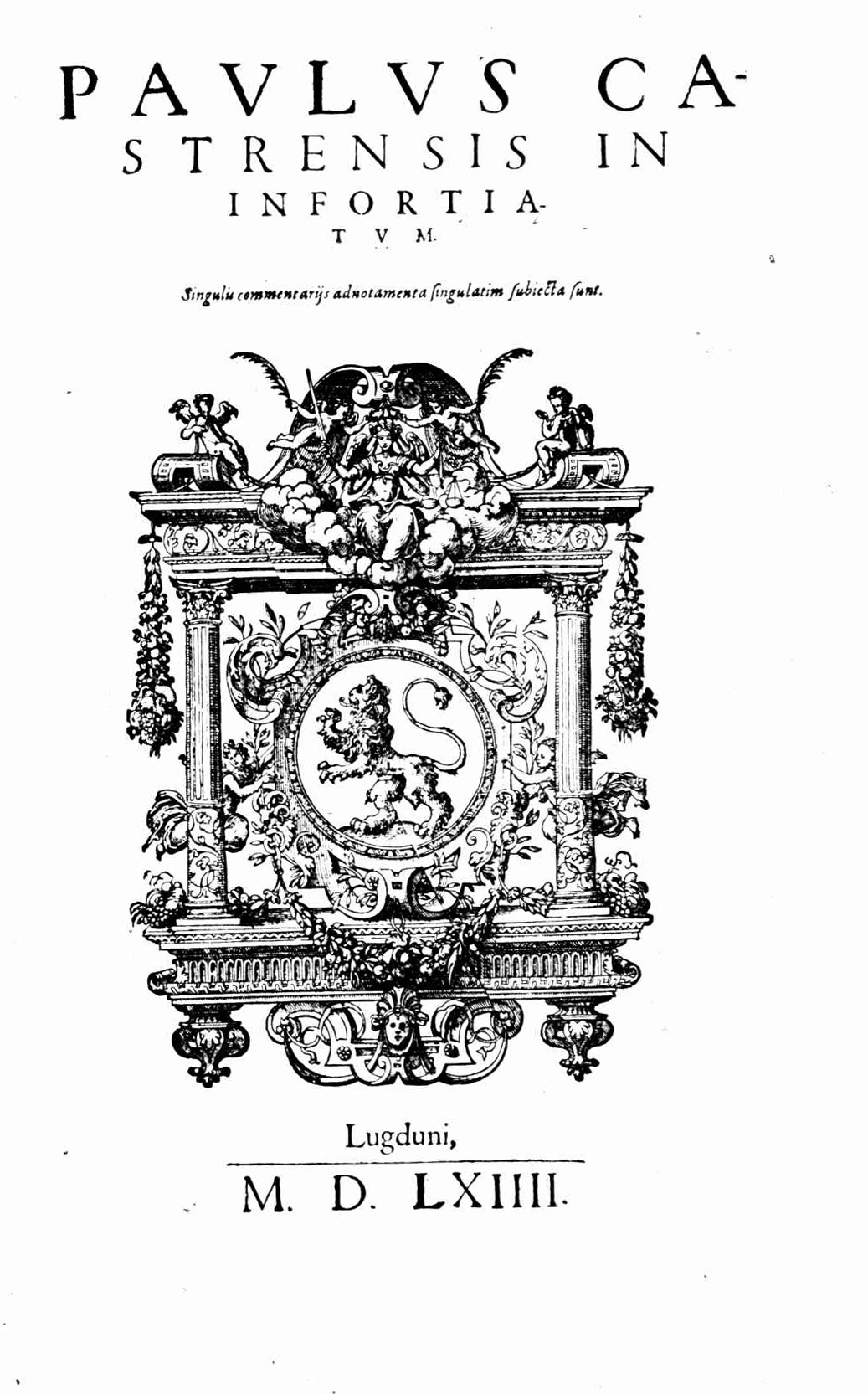
In Infortiatum, 1564

- Consilia et allegationes. Roma: Wendelinus de Wila. 1473. (posthumous work)
  - Consilia (in Latin). Vol. 1. Venezia: Società dell'Aquila che si rinnova. 1581.
  - Consilia (in Latin). Vol. 2. Venezia: Società dell'Aquila che si rinnova. 1581.
  - Consilia (in Latin). Vol. 3. Venezia: Società dell'Aquila che si rinnova. 1581.
- Lectura super VI. libro Codicis. Brescia: Heinrich von Köln per Antonium Venereum et Johannem Hemo. 1477. (posthumous work)
- Lectura super II. parte digesti veteris. Bologna: Heinrich von Köln per Sigismundum a Libris. 1478. (posthumous work)
- Lectura super I. parte Infortiati. Bologna: Heinrich von Köln. 1478. (posthumous work)
- Lectura super II. parte Infortiati. Ferrara: Andreas Belfortis. 1480. (posthumous work)
  - In Infortiatum (in Latin). Lyon: Etienne Servain. 1564.
- Lectura super II parte digesti novi, cum aepistolam Francisci Tuppi. Napoli: Sixtus Riessinger per Bernardinum de Gerardinis de Amelia. 1479. (posthumous work)
- Repetitio in rubrica de liberis et postumis. Bologna: Heinrich von Köln. 1479. (posthumous work)
- Lectura super I.-III. libris Codicis. Modena: Heinrich von Köln. 1483. (posthumous work)
- Lectura super I. parte digesti veteris. Bologna: Heinrich von Köln. 1483. (posthumous work)
- Lectura super VII. libro Codicis. Venezia: Franciscus Moneliensis, Hermann Liechtenstein. 1483. (posthumous work)
- Lectura super I. parte digesti novi. Francisci Moneliensis. 1483. (posthumous work)
- Epistolae. Venezia: Bernardinus Stagninus. 1483. (posthumous work)
- Lectura super VI. libro Codicis. Siena: Heinrich von Köln & C. 1484. (posthumous work)
- Lectura super IV. libro Codicis. Siena: Heinrich von Köln per Laurentium Canizarium, Jacobum Germonia & Lucam de Martinis. 1485. (posthumous work)
- Repetitiones tres etc. Venezia: Bernardinus Stagninus. 1491. (posthumous work)
- Alberti de Gandino (1491). De maleficiis, cum Additionibus Pauli de Castro. Venezia: Bernardinus Stagninus.
- Repetitio de vi et de iudiciis. Pavia: Leonardus Gerla. 1494a. (complete posthumous work)
- Patavinae praelectiones (in Latin). Vol. 1. Lyon: Georges Regnault. 1546.
  - Patavinae praelectiones (in Latin). Vol. 2. Lyon: François Marchant & Claude Marchant. 1547.
  - Patavinae praelectiones (in Latin). Vol. 3. Lyon: Gaspard Trechsel. 1546.
  - Patavinae praelectiones (in Latin). Vol. 4. Lyon: Georges Regnault. 1546.
  - Patavinae praelectiones (in Latin). Vol. 5. Lyon: Gaspard Trechsel. 1546.
  - Patavinae praelectiones (in Latin). Vol. 6. Lyon: Georges Regnault. 1548.
  - Patavinae praelectiones (in Latin). Vol. 7. Lyon: Gaspard Trechsel. 1546.
  - Patavinae praelectiones (in Latin). Vol. 8. Lyon: Georges Regnault. 1548.
