= Baldus de Ubaldis =

Italian jurist

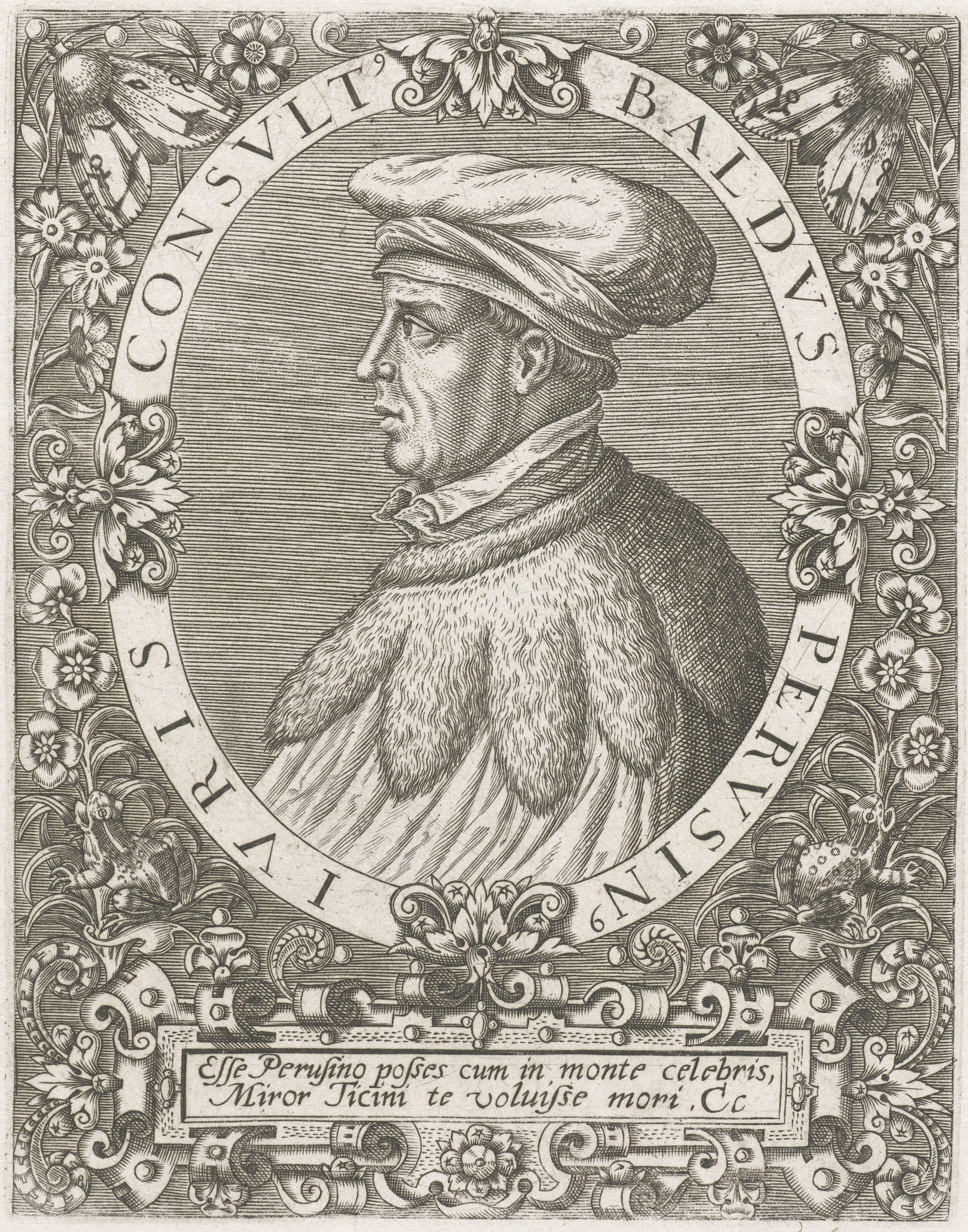
Baldo degli Ubaldi

Baldus de Ubaldis (Italian: Baldo degli Ubaldi; 1327 – 28 April 1400) was an Italian jurist, and a leading figure in Medieval Roman Law and the school of Postglossators.

== Life ==
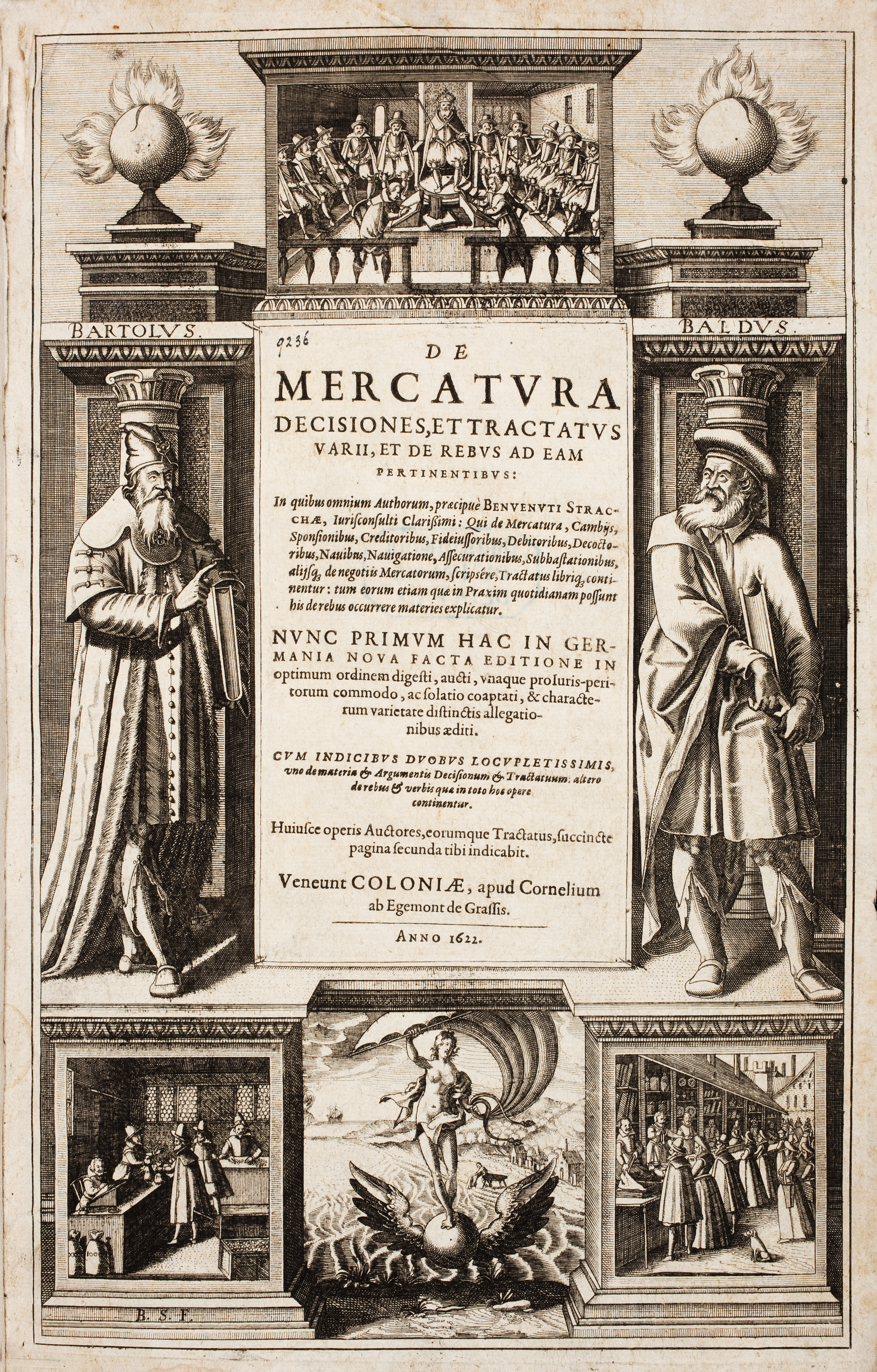
Baldus de Ubaldis at the right on the title page of Benvenutus Straccha (Benvenuto Stracca): De mercatura decisiones, 1671

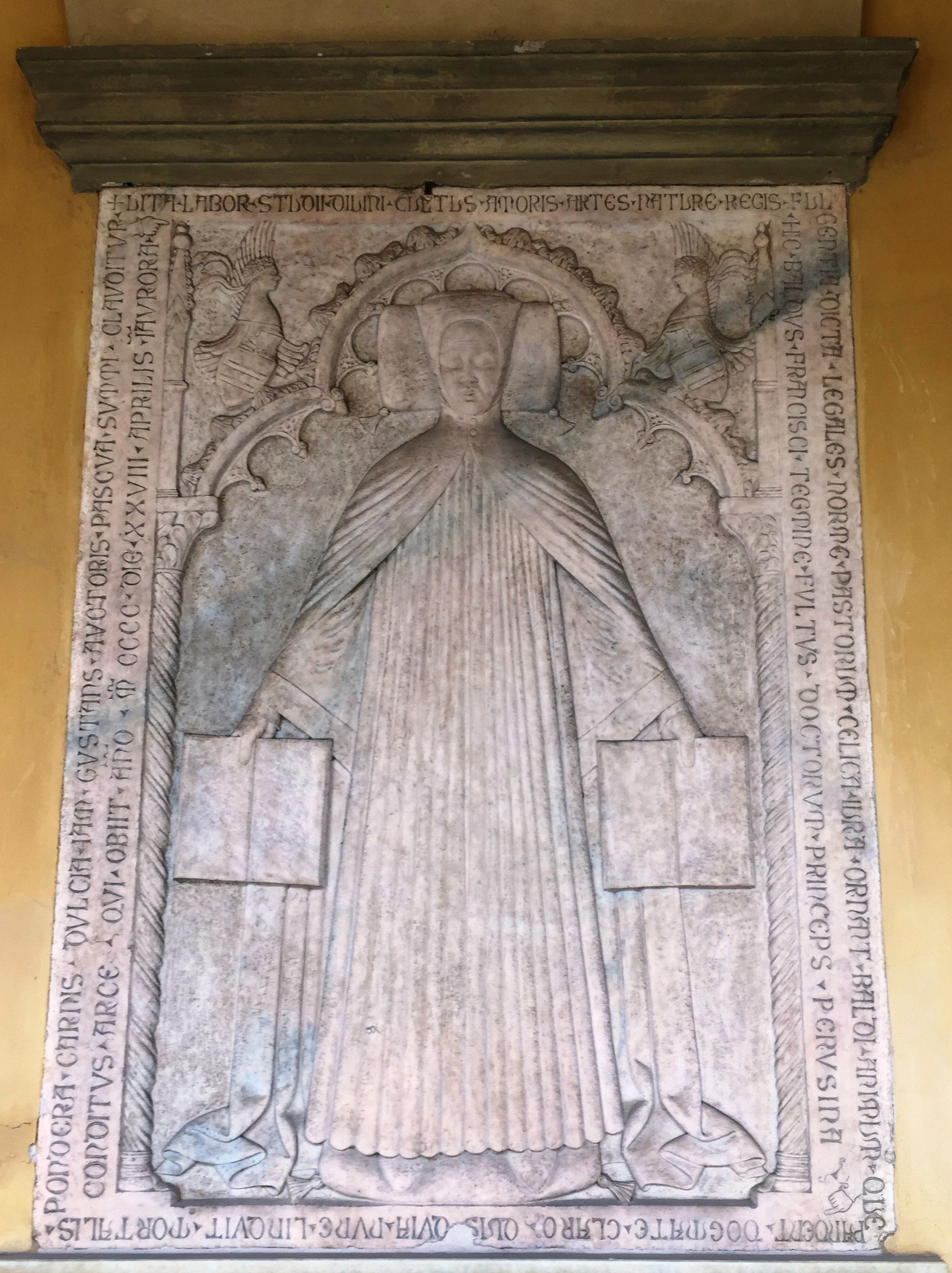
Gravestone of Baldus, about 1400, Pavia, University

A member of the noble family of the Ubaldi (Baldeschi), Baldus was born at Perugia in 1327, and studied civil law there under Bartolus de Saxoferrato, being admitted to the degree of doctor of civil law at the early age of seventeen. Federicus Petrucius of Siena is said to have been the master under whom he studied canon law.

Baldus had two brothers, Angelus (1328–1400) and Petrus (1335–1400). It is probably due to confusion between Baldus and his brother Petrus that the famous jurist's name is sometimes given as Petrus Baldus de Ubaldis.

On his promotion to the doctorate, he went to Bologna, where he taught law for three years. He then advanced to a professorship at Perugia, where he remained for thirty-three years, and he had among his students Francesco Albergotti. He subsequently taught law at Pisa, Florence, Padua and Pavia, the rivals to Bologna. During his period at Pavia, he sometimes also taught at Piacenza. He died at Pavia on 28 April 1400 and was buried in the church of San Francesco.

Baldus was the master of Pierre Roger de Beaufort, who became pope under the title of Gregory XI, and whose immediate successor, Urban VI, summoned Baldus to Rome to assist him by his consultations in 1380 against the anti-pope Clement VII. Baldus' view on the legal issues relating to the schism are laid down in the so-called Questio de schismate. Cardinal Francesco Zabarella and Paulus Castrensis were also among his pupils.

== Works ==
Many of Baldus' works are incomplete. He left voluminous commentaries on the Pandects and on the Codex Justinianus. His Commentary on the Libri Feudorum, a twelfth-century compilation of feudal law provisions, is considered to be one of his best works. He also commented on the canon law compilations of decretals, the Liber Extra and the Liber Sextus. In addition to these commentaries, Baldus wrote a number of treatises on specialised legal topics. His major effort, however, went into the writing of some 3,000 consilia (legal opinions). No other medieval lawyer has so many consilia preserved.

Baldus's work on the law of evidence and the gradations of proof was a high point of medieval thought in the discipline and remained the standard treatment of the subject for centuries.

The jurist Flavio Torti (died 1622) wrote annotated observations on his work.

=== Publications ===
- De syndicatu officialium
- De duobus fratribus
- De significatione verborum
- De pace Constantiae
- De feudis
- Summula respiciens facta mercatorum.
- Commentaria in digestum vetus, 1549.
- Consiliorum sive responsorum, 1575.
- In usus feudorum commentaria (in Latin). 1580.
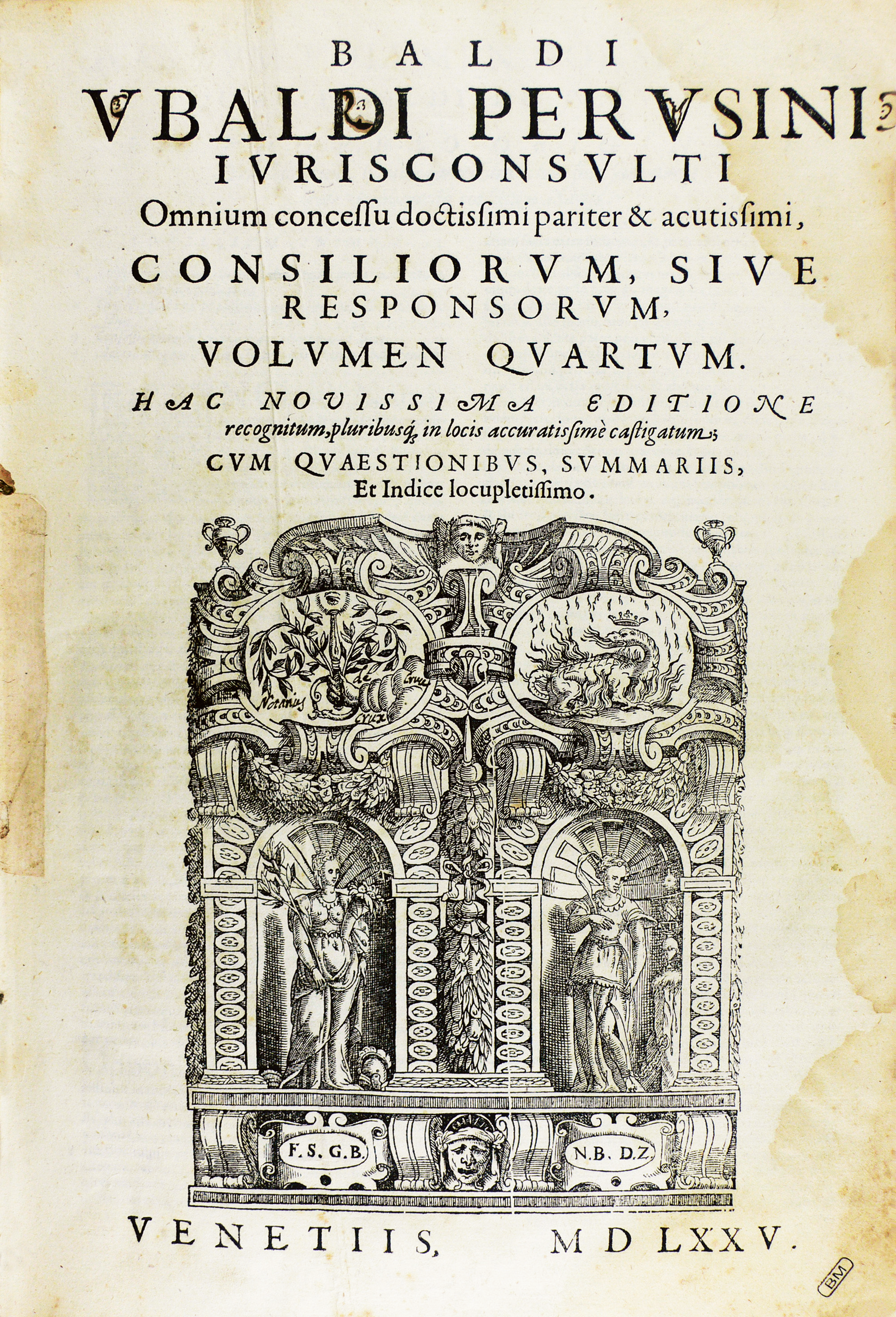
Consiliorum, sive responsorum, 1575.

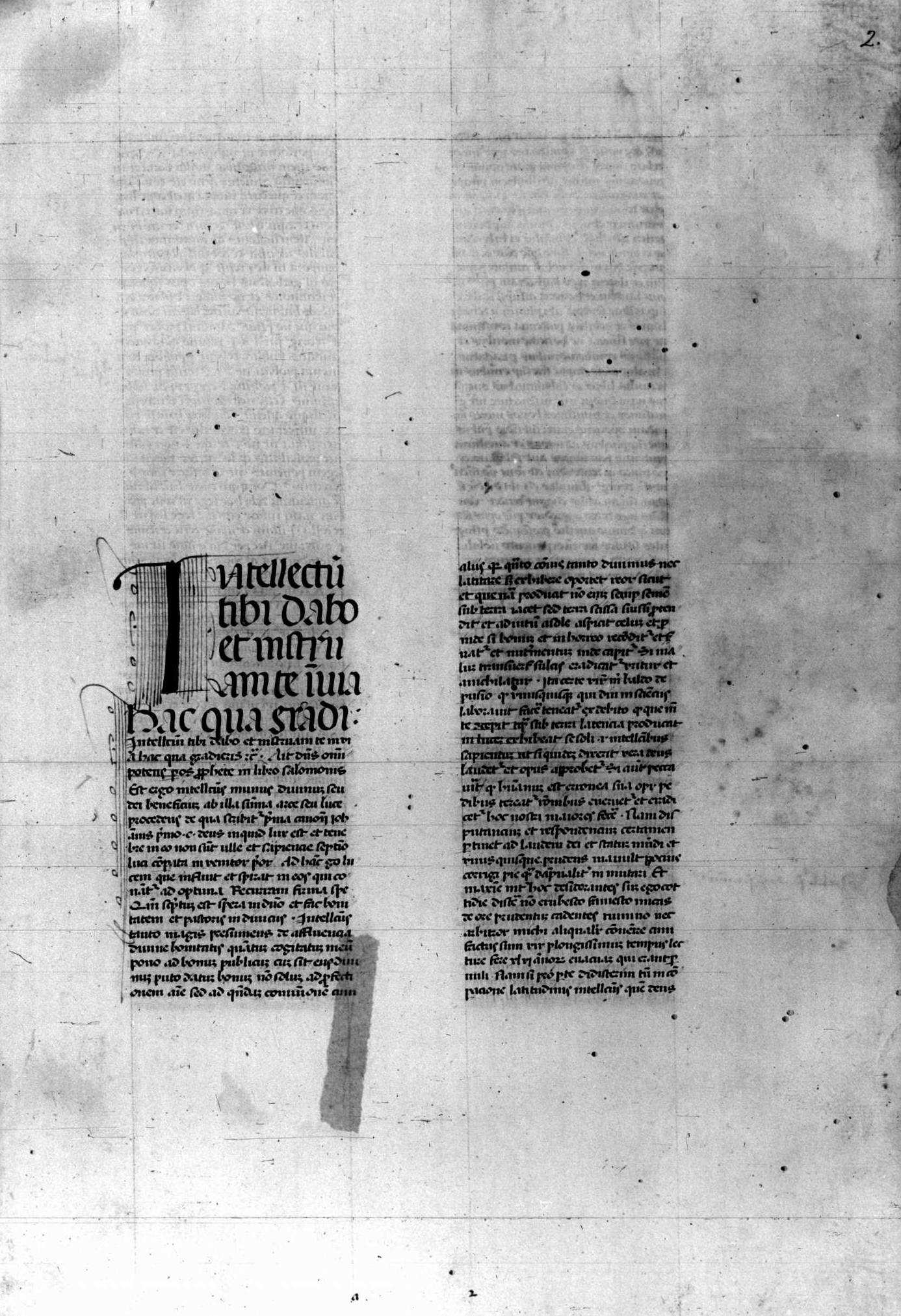
Lectura feudorum, 15th-century manuscript. Leiden, Universiteitsbibliotheek, Collectie Willem Matthias D'Ablaing, ABL 7.
