= Francesco Albergotti =

Italian lawyer (1304–1376)

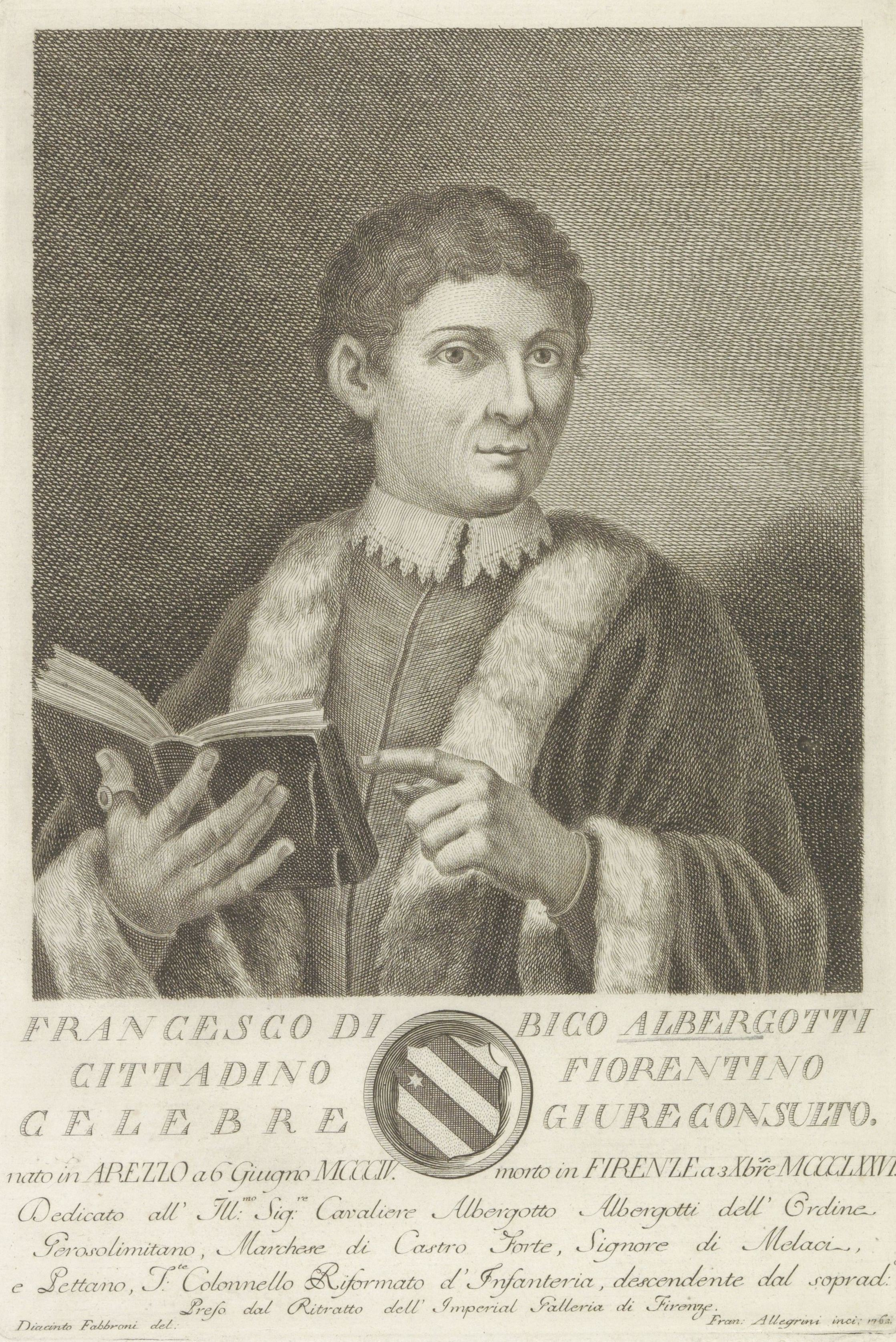
Portrait of Francesco Albergotti

Francesco Albergotti (6 June 1304 – 3 December 1376) was an Italian jurist in the 14th century.

== Life ==
Francesco Albergotti was born in 1304 from the Albergotti, the biggest Guelph family in Arezzo for the role they had in the political, religious and military life of the city. He started his studies at the University of Perugia, first in philosophy, then in law, as a student of the famous Baldo degli Ubaldi. He started a career as a lawyer in Arezzo, and in 1349, he moved to Florence, where he gained considerable fame as a teacher, being named "solidae veritatis doctor" (doctor of solid truths).

He wrote comments to the Digest and some books of the Codex Theodosianus (in various manuscripts), and other different consilia (published in 1563 in Venice).

He died in Florence in 1376.

== Works ==
=== Manuscripts ===
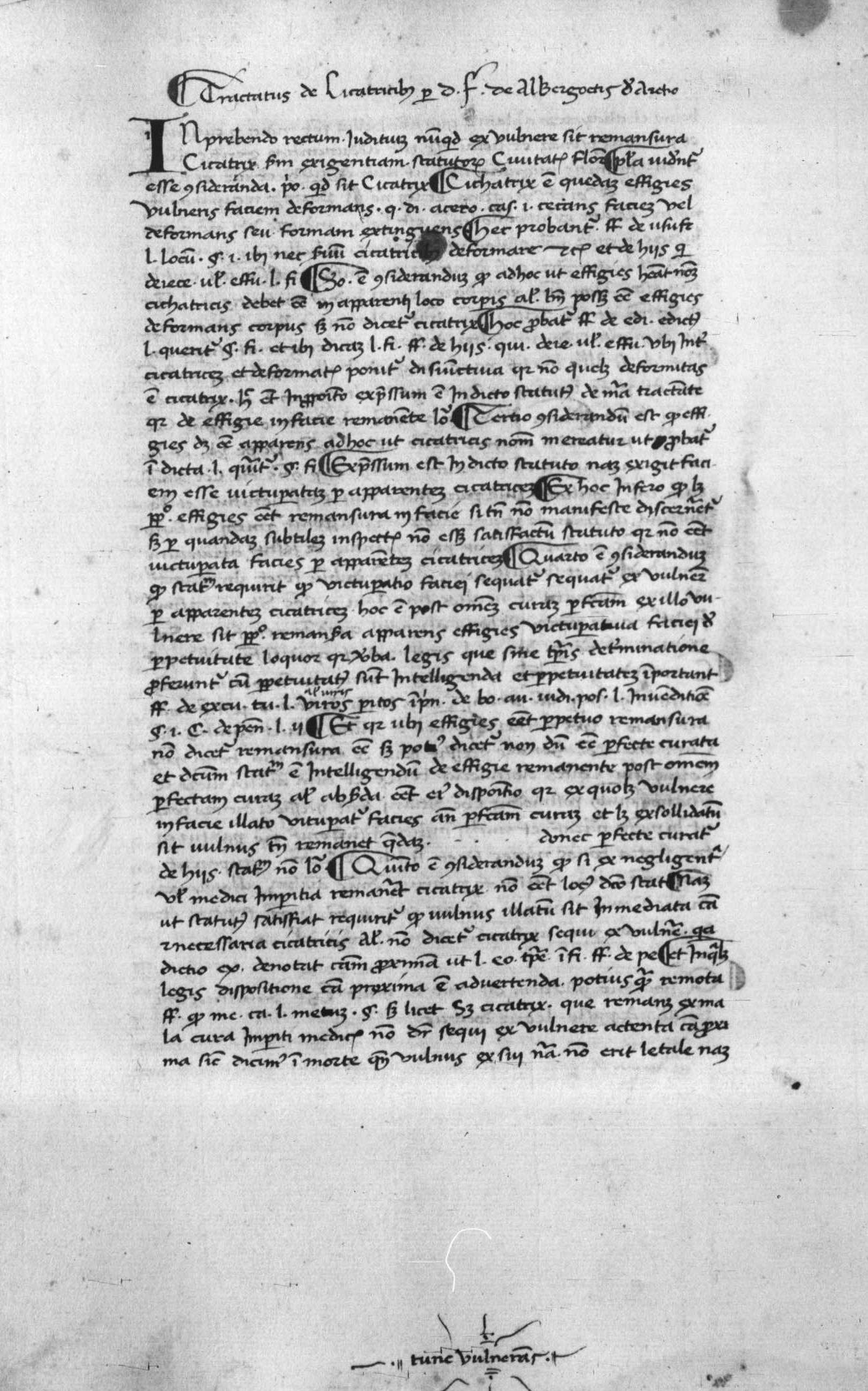
Tractatus de cicatricibus, 15th-century manuscript. Vatican City, Biblioteca Apostolica Vaticana, Fondo Vaticano latino, Vat. lat. 8069.

- Repetitio ad D. 6.1.38 (Biblioteca del Collegio di Spagna, Fondo manoscritti, ms. 82, ff. 294r-295r, 14th century ed.). Bologna.
- Consilia (Studienbibliothek Dillingen/Donau, Handschriften, XV.61, ff. 262r ss., 15th century ed.). Dillingen.
- Consilia (Biblioteca Capitolare Feliniana, Fondo manoscritti, ms. 419 ed.). Lucca.
- Tractatus de cicatricibus (Biblioteca Apostolica Vaticana, Fondo Vaticano latino, Vat. lat. 8069, ff. 161v-162 ed.). Città del Vaticano, 15th century.
- Tractatus de cicatricibus (Biblioteca Apostolica Vaticana, Fondo Vaticano latino, Vat. lat. 9428, f. 351v ed.). Città del Vaticano.

== Bibliography ==
- Ermini, Giuseppe (1929). "ALBERGOTTI, Francesco". Enciclopedia Italiana (in Italian). Rome: Istituto dell'Enciclopedia Italiana.
