= Flavio (disambiguation) =

Flavio is an opera in three acts by George Frideric Handel.

Flavio may also refer to the following:

== Aircraft ==
- Quasar Flavio, a Czech hang glider design

== People ==
- Flavio (given name), Italian and Spanish given name
- Flávio, Portuguese given name
- Flávio Amado (born 1979), Angolan footballer
- Flavio Briatore (born 1950), Italian businessman
- Flavio Barros (born 1978), Brazilian footballer
- Flavio Biondo (1392–1463), Italian Renaissance humanist historian
- Flávio Canto (born 1975), Brazilian judoka
- Flavio Cipolla (born 1983), Italian tennis player
- Flavio Cotti (1939–2020), Swiss politician
- Flávio Conceição (born 1974), Brazilian footballer
- Flavio Delbono (born 1959), Italian economist and politician
- Flávio Gonçalves (born 2007), Portuguese footballer
- Flavio Maestri (born 1973), Peruvian footballer
- Flávio Meireles (born 1976), Portuguese footballer
- Flávio Saretta (born 1980), Brazilian tennis player
