= Flavio Santoro =

German-Italian footballer (born 2001)

Personal information
- Date of birth: 30 November 2001 (age 24)
- Height: 1.84 m (6 ft 0 in)
- Position: Forward

Team information
- Current team: TSG Backnang 1919
- Number: 10

Youth career
- 2017–2018: FSV Waiblingen
- 2019–2020: Sonnenhof Großaspach

Senior career*
| Years | Team | Apps | (Gls) |
| 2020–2022 | Sonnenhof Großaspach | 20 | (0) |
| 2021–2022 | → TSG Backnang 1919 (loan) | 36 | (3) |
| 2022– | TSG Backnang 1919 | 99 | (15) |
- * Club domestic league appearances and goals as of 19:29, 13 May 2024 (UTC)

Flavio Santoro (born 30 November 2001) is a German-Italian footballer who plays as a forward for TSG Backnang 1919.
