= Flavio Signore =

Italian film producer (born 1970)

Flavio Signore (Rome, Italy, 1970) is a producer, filmmaker, reporter, educator and manager of international cooperation programs. He produces documentary films and news, coordinates projects for armed conflict victim relief based on art therapy and education.

== Essential filmography ==
- Syria: Rebellion, Revolution or a Holy War? (2012)
- Libya Freedom Mia Mia (2011)
- Georgia for Peace (2008)
- Yunus: Economy for Peace (2007)
- Living under the Bombs (2006)
- Buddha in Exile (2005)
- The Dance of Shita (2004)
