= Flavio Zveiter =

Brazilian lawyer and professor (born 1981)

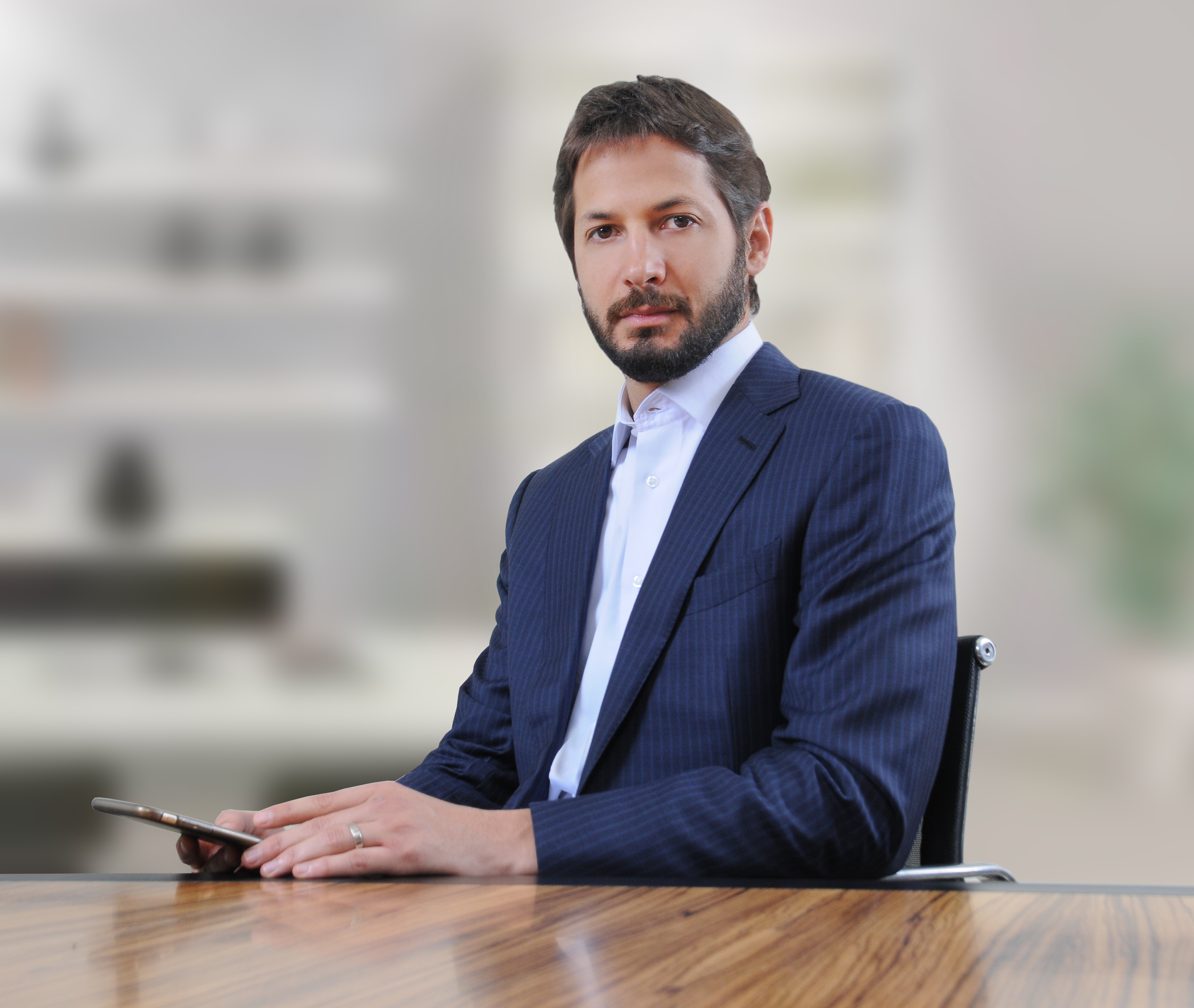

Flavio Zveiter

Personal details
- Born: July 11, 1981 (age 44) Niterói, Rio de Janeiro, Brazil
- Spouse: Luíza Mariani
- Profession: Lawyer

Flavio Zveiter (born July 11, 1981, Niterói) is a Brazilian lawyer and professor, former President of the Superior Court of Sport Justice, highest body of Sport Justice in Brazil.

He is the son of Luiz Zveiter, also former President of STJD and former President of the Court of Justice of Rio de Janeiro, nephew of Federal Deputy Sergio Zveiter, grandson of former Ministry of the Superior Court of Justice Waldemar Zveiter and married to the actress Luíza Mariani.

== Career ==
=== Superior Court of Sport Justice ===
The Zveiter family had been in command of STJD since the 1990s. Flávio had already been working as an auditor of the Court since 2000. Before him, his father Luiz Zveiter was the President between 1996 and 1998 and later between 2000 and 2005. In the meantime, Sérgio Zveiter, Flávio's uncle, took over as the President. Waldemar Zveiter, Flávio's grandfather, court of appeals judge and former Ministry of the Superior Court of Justice, was a close friend and lawyer of Roberto Marinho, founder of Organizações Globo.

Flávio Zveiter was elected as President of the Court in July 2012, having Caio Rocha as vice-president, and Paulo Schmitt, reelected as Attorney General.

Flávio Zveiter was appointed to be a part of STJD as a representative of the football teams in Série A then, as provided for in article 55 of law 9.615. The appointment was unanimously approved.

It was during Flávio Zveiter's administration that the STJD was involved in a polemic case of the downgrade of Portuguesa. Due to an irregular lineup of the midfielder Héverton, the Portuguesa was punished, lost three points and ended up lowered to Campeonato Brasileiro Série B, keeping Flamengo, which also presented an irregular lineup of the left-back André Santos, and, because of that, was also punished, losing 3 points as well, in primeira divisão after a long battle in Court.

In 2014 he announced he would not run for re-election to act exclusively in the family's law firm once again. In June of the same year Caio Rocha was elected as his successor. However, Flávio remained as auditor.

In 2015, he was a member of the Commission of Jurists in Federal Senate, being responsible for preparing the bill for the General Sports Law. He took office on February 2, 2016 as member of the Federal Council of the Brazilian Bar Association for the three-year period - 2016/2018 - representing the State of Rio de Janeiro.

He is a founder of Academia Nacional de Direito Desportivo (National Academy of Sports Law) and since July 2016 he has been the President of the Comissão Nacional de Acompanhamento Legislativo (National Committee for Legislative Monitoring) of the Federal Brazilian Bar Association Council.

In May 2017, he was appointed by Conmebol to, since then, integrate FIFA Ethics Committee FIFA, being the first Brazilian to hold such position.

== Published works ==
- O Curso de Direito Desportivo Sistêmico – Volume II (co-author - Editora Quartier Latin, 1,152 pages)
