= Flavio Azzaro =

Argentine sports journalist and broadcaster

Flavio Azzaro is an Argentine sports journalist and broadcaster. He is the co-host of the live-streamed program El loco y el cuerdo with Andrés Ducatenzeiler and the founder of the sports streaming channel AZZ.

== Early life ==
Azzaro was born in Avellaneda, Buenos Aires Province, Argentina. In interviews, he has described producing Racing Club de Avellaneda–focused reports from childhood and later starting a fan program titled Identidad racinguista while studying journalism.

== Career ==
=== Radio and television ===
After working on club-focused radio content, Azzaro joined Radio La Red in 2012 and later debuted on television on América TV's Show del Fútbol (2013–2014). He also participated in panel formats beyond sports, including the Gran Hermano debate show, and hosted a magazine program on Radio Latina. He later hosted the football debate program Fútbol al Horno on Canal 26.

In 2018, he covered the 2018 FIFA World Cup for TyC Sports programming; after the tournament he was dismissed from the network. In 2020, Azzaro hosted Azzaro Mundial on América TV, a travel-and-interview format built around Argentine footballers playing abroad during the COVID-19 pandemic period.

Azzaro founded the sports streaming channel AZZ, which produces football-oriented live programming and commentary. This channel has been accused by Argentine labour unions of violating employee registration rules, having poor working conditions, and obstructing inspections.

== Personal life ==
Azzaro's partner, Sol Nobile, works as his camera operator. In 2025, entertainment press reported that Azzaro and Sol were expecting a child, whom they planned to name Piero.
