= Flavio Torti =

Italian lawyer and writer (died 1622)

Flavio Torti (died 1622) was a lawyer and writer, active in his native Pavia and also in Milan. He was prince of the Accademia di Affidati in Milan.

== Biography ==
Born in Pavia or Castelnuovo Scrivia He belonged to a family with a number of lawyers. The Senate of Milan awarded him the position of primary professor of Canon and Civil law at the University of Pavia, a position he held for 30 years. He worked as counselor and auditor of the Inquisition of Milan. He wrote a multivolume commentary on the works of medieval jurist Baldo degli Ubaldi (1327 – 1400) titled Annotationes, seu Lucubrationes ad statuta inclytae civitatis Papiae published in 1617.

== Bibliography ==
- Annotationes, seu Lucubrationes ad statuta inclytae civitatis Papiae By Flavio Torti (1617).
