= Flavio Poli =

Italian artist and designer (1900–1984)

- Born: 1900; Chioggia
- Died: 1984 (aged 83–84); Venice
- Occupations: Artist; Glassmaker
- Awards: Compasso d'Oro

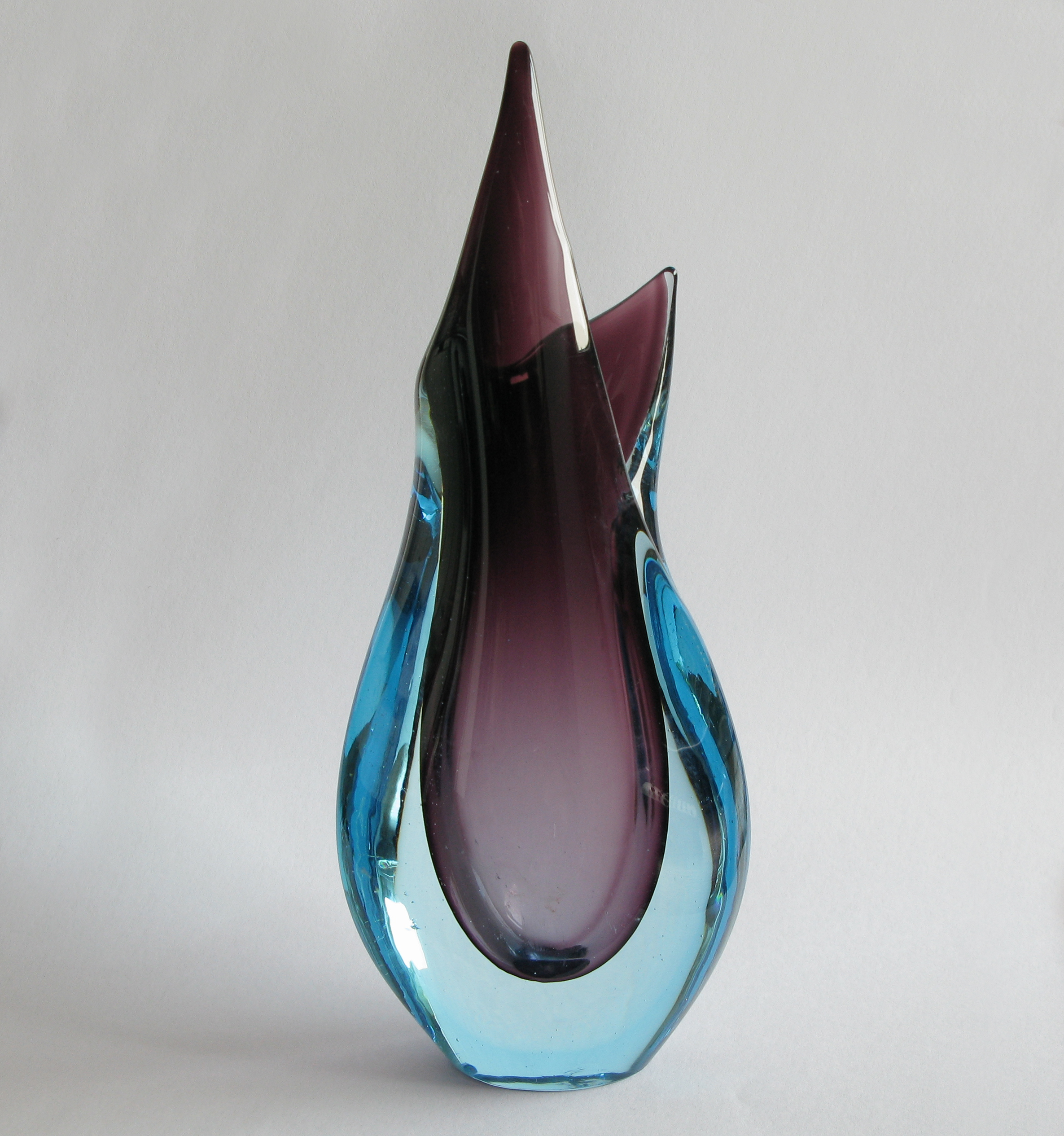
Vase made by Seguso Vetri d’Arte, in 'submerged' style, to a design by Poli

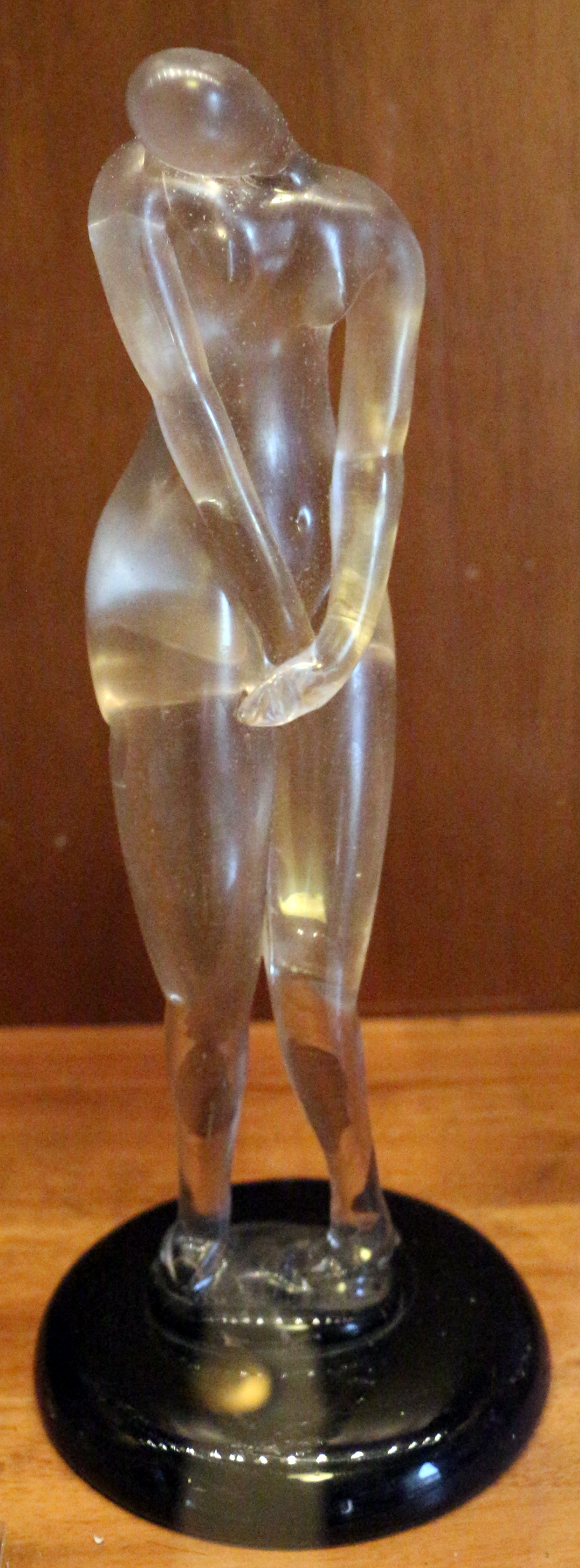
Flavio Poli for I.V.A.M., naked female solid crystal from Shame, collection, Murano 1930–31

Flavio Poli (1900–1984) was an Italian artist, known for his designs in glass.

Born in 1900, he was trained at the Istituto d'Arte di Venezia, then began work as a ceramicist.

In 1929, he began working for the company "I.V.A.M." (Industrie Vetraie Artistiche Murano) as a designer of glassware. He was appointed artistic director of Barovier, Seguso & Ferro (later Seguso Vetri d’Arte) in 1934, where he devised a style of 'submerged' glass, with several transparent layers, one over the other. Within three years, he was a partner in the company. Poli received one of the inaugural Compasso d'Oro awards in 1954 for the Seguso “Mod. 9822” blue-ruby glass vase. He left Seguso in 1963.

From 1964 to 1966 he led the artistic glass division of the Società Veneziana di Conterie e Cristallerie.

Poli died in 1984. A number of his works are in the Murano Glass Museum, as well as the Victoria and Albert Museum in London; the National Gallery of Victoria, Australia; the Corning Museum of Glass, and the Metropolitan Museum and Museum of Modern Art in New York.
