= Flavio Rota =

Swiss gymnast (born 1966)

- Born: 20 July 1966 (age 60)
- Height: 1.67 m (5 ft 6 in)

Gymnastics career
- Discipline: Men's artistic gymnastics
- Country represented: Switzerland
- Gym: Sport- und Turnverein Le Locle

Flavio Rota (born 20 July 1966) is a Swiss gymnast. He competed in eight events at the 1992 Summer Olympics.
