= Flavio Gastaldi =

Italian politician (born 1991)

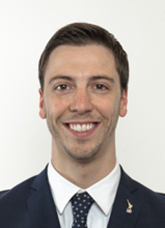
- Gastaldi in 2018

Member of the Chamber of Deputies
- In office 23 March 2018 – 12 October 2022
- Constituency: Piedmont 2 – U07

Personal details
- Born: 1 July 1991 (age 35)
- Party: Lega

Flavio Gastaldi (born 1 July 1991) is an Italian politician serving as mayor of Genola since 2019. From 2018 to 2022, he was a member of the Chamber of Deputies. From 2019 to 2024, he served as chairman of Lega Giovani in Piedmont.
