= Flavio Ciuferri =

Italian footballer (born 2004)

Personal information
- Date of birth: 26 March 2004 (age 22)
- Place of birth: Rome, Italy
- Height: 1.78 m (5 ft 10 in)
- Position: Midfielder

Team information
- Current team: Treviso

Youth career
- –2019: Vigor Perconti
- 2019–2020: Lodigiani
- 2020–2023: Roma

Senior career*
Years	Team	Apps	(Gls)
2023–2025	Giugliano	54	(9)
2025–2026	Trapani	26	(2)
2026–	Treviso	0	(0)
- * Club domestic league appearances and goals as of 1 May 2026

Flavio Ciuferri (born 26 March 2004) is an Italian professional footballer who plays as a midfielder for Serie C club Treviso.

== Club career ==
Born in Rome, Ciuferri spent his first formation years at local club Vigor Perconti: following trials with Ascoli, Frosinone and Benevento, he moved to fellow Rome-based club Lodigiani in August 2019. Then, he joined Roma's academy in January 2020. Here, the midfielder come through the youth ranks, being eventually promoted to the under-19 squad in the summer of 2022.

Having not managed to break into the team on a regular basis, on 19 January 2023 Ciuferri officially departed Roma to join Serie C side Giugliano, signing his first professional contract with the club. He then made his professional debut for the club on 5 February, coming on as a substitute in the second half of a 4–1 league loss against Virtus Francavilla.

On 5 November of the same year, he scored his first professional goal in a 3–0 league victory over Brindisi. He then scored in both of the two following league matches against Benevento and Avellino. He scored a total amount of seven goals and three assists throughout the 2023–24 league campaign.

On 16 January 2025, Ciuferri joined fellow Serie C side Trapani on a permanent deal.

== Style of play ==
Ciuferri is a left-footed right winger; he has cited Paulo Dybala as his biggest source of inspiration, even mimicking the forward's signature "mask" celebration after scoring his own goals.

== Personal life ==
His older brother Massimo (b. 2002) is also a footballer: the two played together both at Vigor Perconti and Lodigiani.

== Career statistics ==
=== Club ===
As of match played 13 January 2025

Club	Season	League			Cup		Other		Total	
Club	Season	Division	Apps	Goals	Apps	Goals	Apps	Goals	Apps	Goals
Giugliano	2022–23	Serie C	4	0	0	0	0	0	4	0
Giugliano	2023–24	Serie C	31	7	2	0	0	0	33	7
Giugliano	2024–25	Serie C	20	2	1	0	0	0	21	2
Total			55	9	3	0	0	0	58	9
Trapani	2024–25	Serie C	0	0	0	0	0	0	0	0
Career total			55	9	3	0	0	0	58	9
