= 2024 Madeiran regional election =

Portuguese regional election

- 26 May 2024

47 seats to the Legislative Assembly of Madeira 24 seats needed for a majority
- Opinion polls
- Turnout: 53.4% ▲0.1 pp
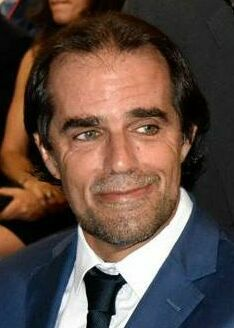

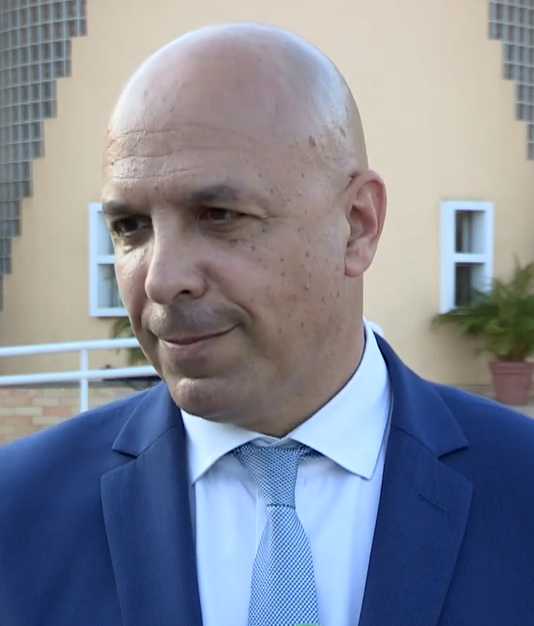

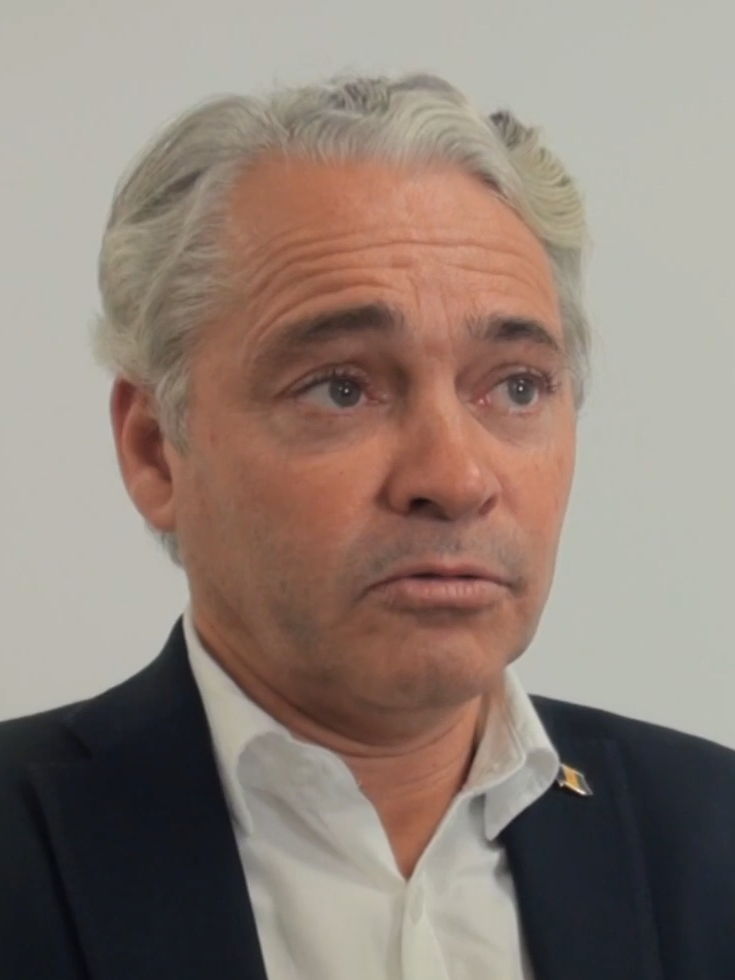

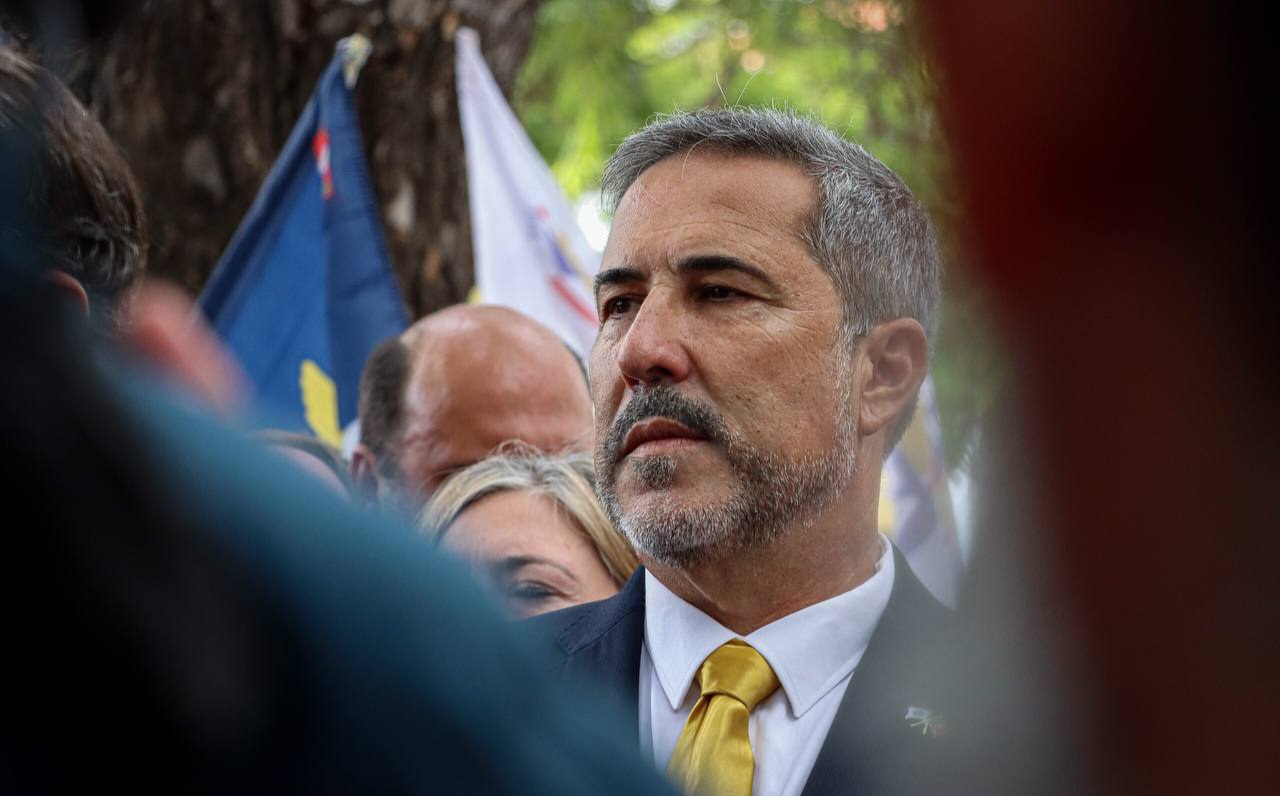

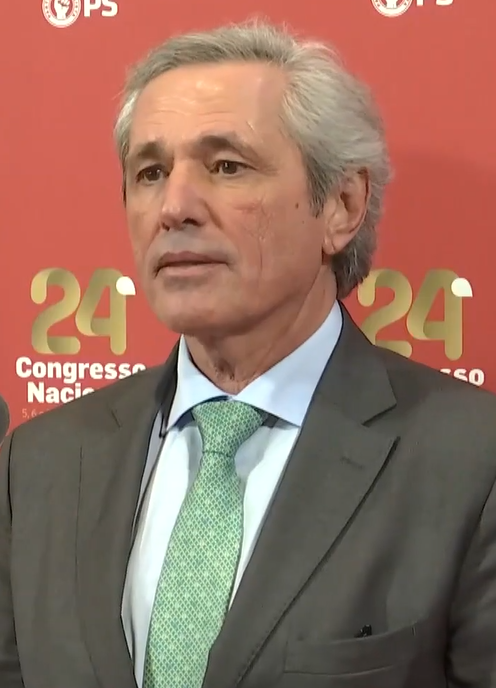

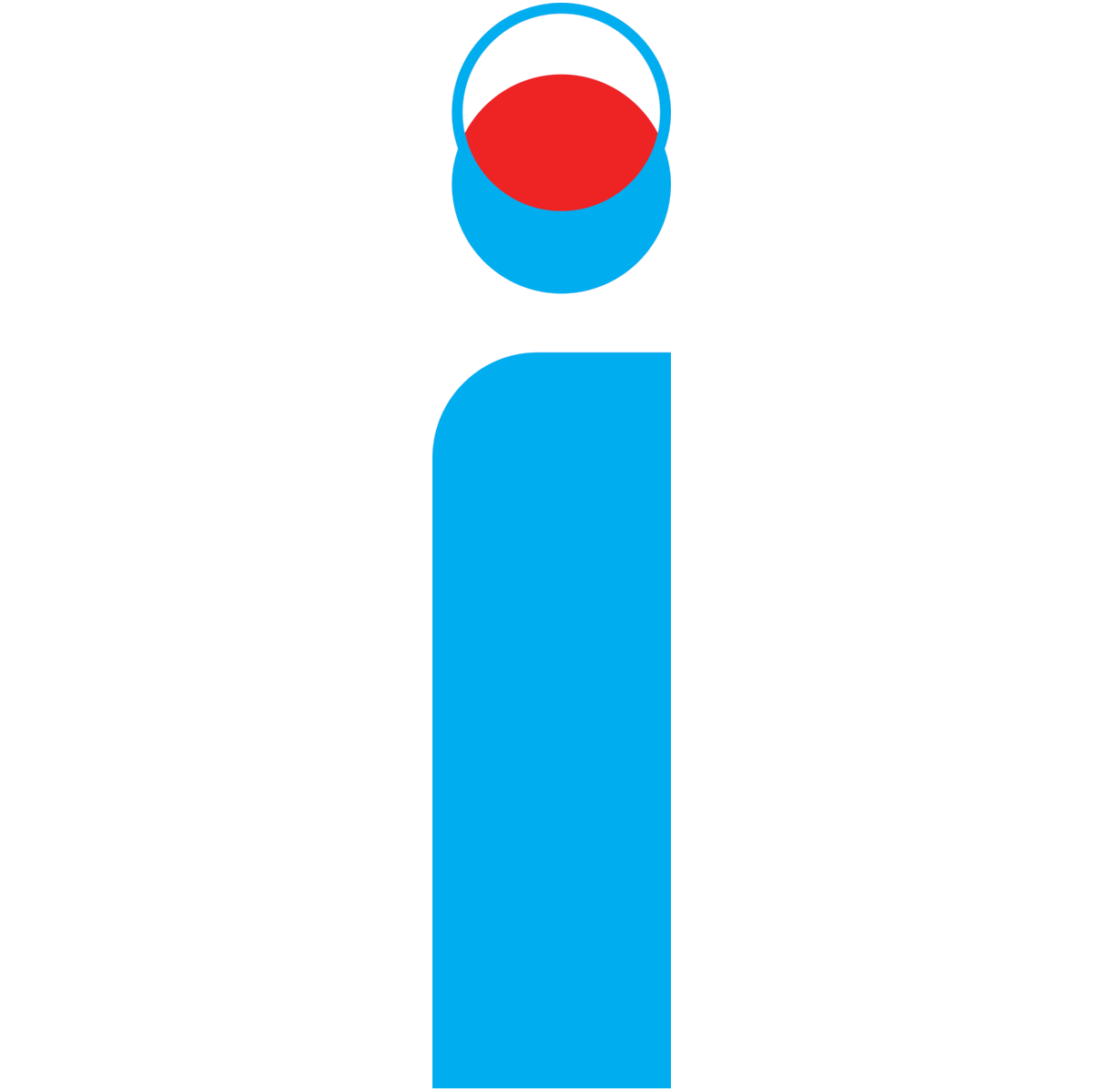

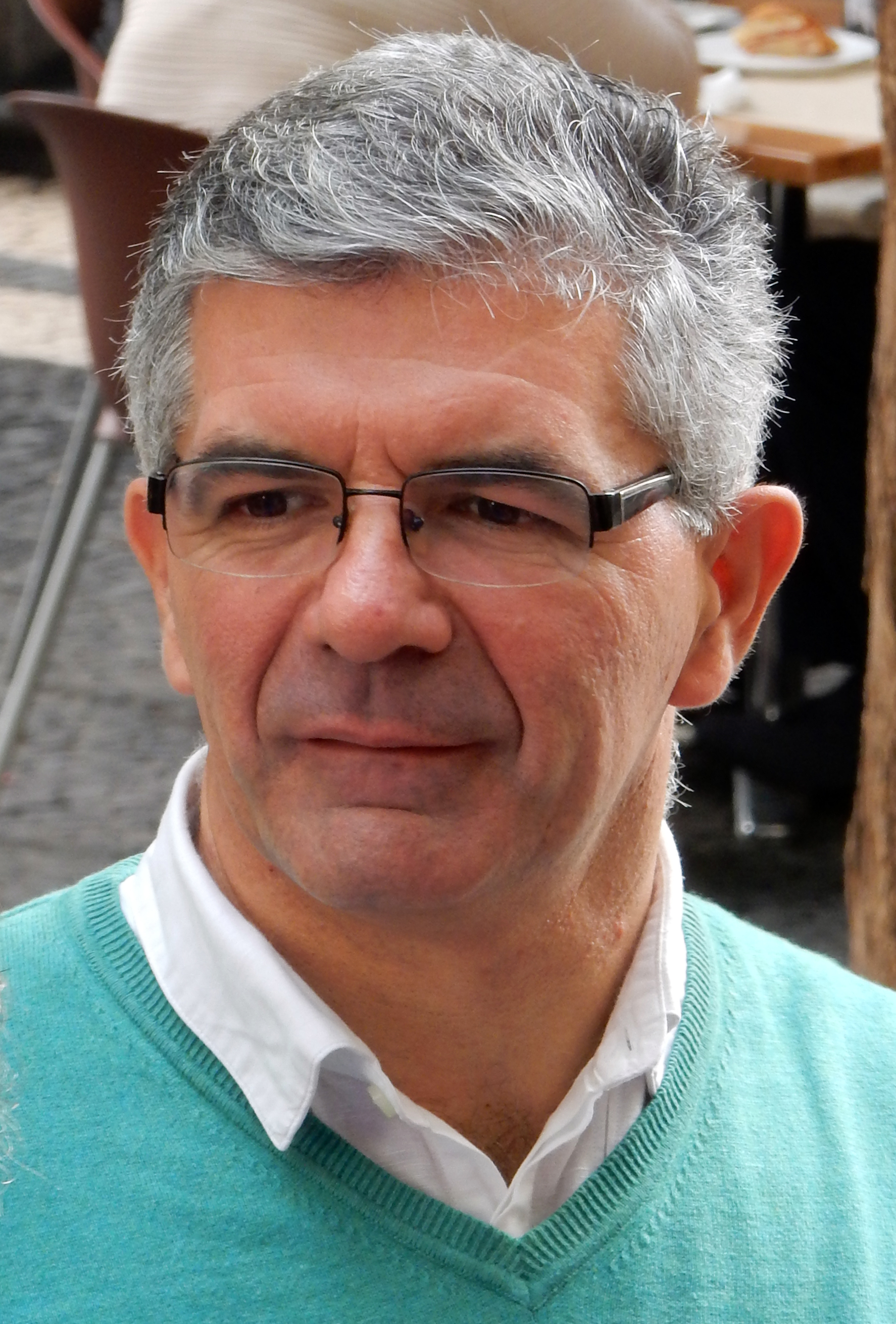

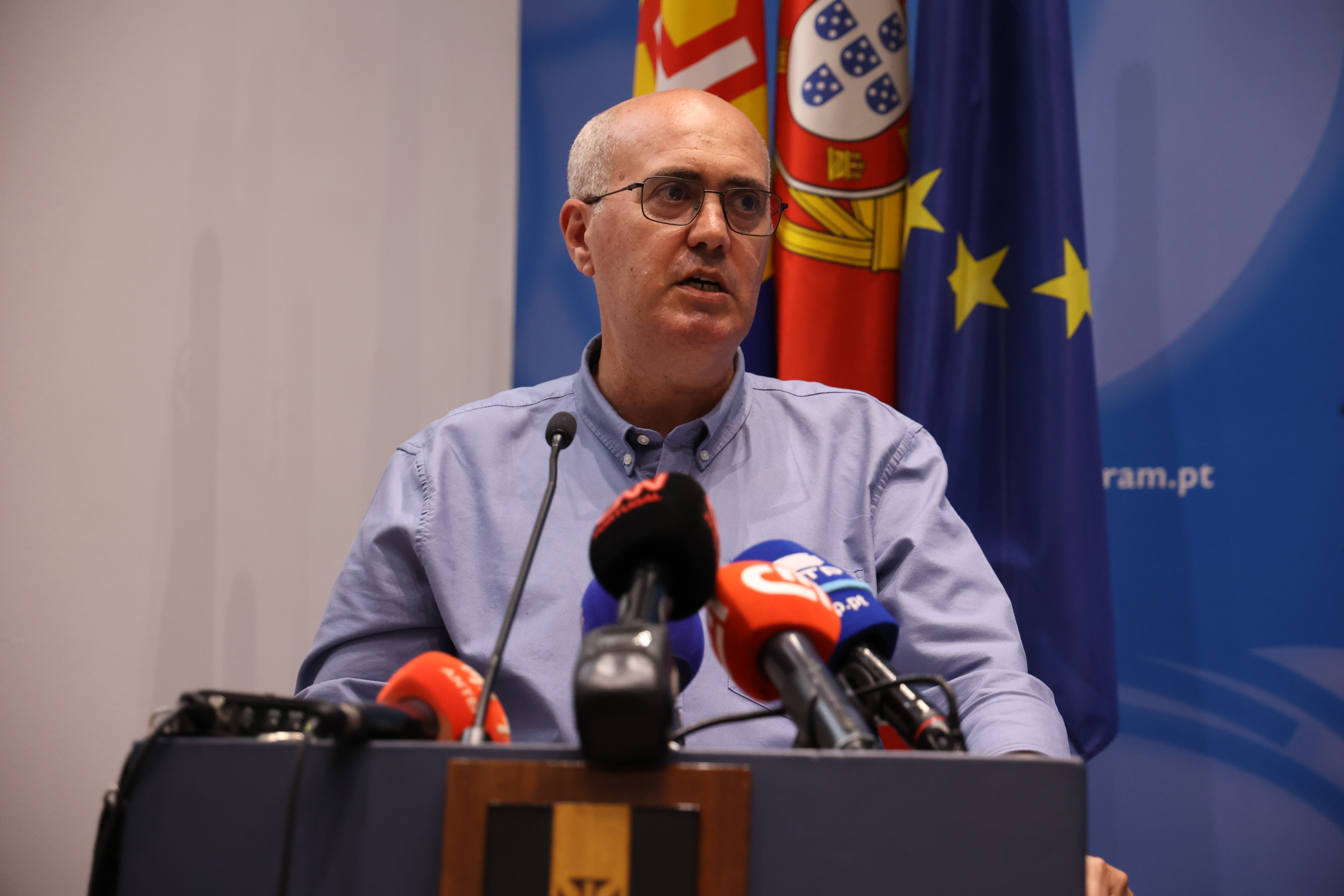
	First party	Second party	Third party
Leader	Miguel Albuquerque	Paulo Cafôfo	Élvio Sousa
Party	PSD	PS	JPP
Leader since	10 January 2015	2 December 2023	27 January 2015
Last election	20 seats (SM) (Note: PSD and CDS–PP contested the 2023 election jointly as the We Are Madeira Coalition, and won a combined 43.1% of the vote and elected 23 MPs to parliament.)	11 seats, 21.3%	5 seats, 11.0%
Seats won	19	11	9
Seat change	▼1	0	▲4
Popular vote	49,104	28,981	22,959
Percentage	36.1%	21.3%	16.9%
Swing		0.0 pp	▲5.9 pp
	Fourth party	Fifth party	Sixth party
Leader	Miguel Castro	José Manuel Rodrigues	Nuno Morna
Party	CH	CDS–PP	IL
Leader since	12 March 2022	14 April 2024	2019
Last election	4 seats, 8.9%	3 seats (SM)	1 seats, 2.6%
Seats won	4	2	1
Seat change	0	▼1	0
Popular vote	12,562	5,374	3,481
Percentage	9.2%	4.0%	2.6%
Swing	▲0.3 pp		0.0 pp
	Seventh party	Eighth party	Ninth party
Leader	Mónica Freitas	Edgar Silva	Roberto Almada
Party	PAN	PCP	BE
Alliance		CDU
Leader since	11 August 2023	1996	18 March 2023
Last election	1 seats, 2.2%	1 seats, 2.7%	1 seats, 2.2%
Seats won	1	0	0
Seat change	0	▼1	▼1
Popular vote	2,531	2,217	1,912
Percentage	1.9%	1.6%	1.4%
Swing	▼0.4 pp	▼1.1 pp	▼0.8 pp
President before election
Miguel Albuquerque
PSD
Elected President
Miguel Albuquerque
PSD

Snap regional elections were held in Madeira on 26 May 2024, to determine the composition of the Legislative Assembly of the Autonomous Region of Madeira. The election replaced all 47 members of the Madeira Assembly, and the new members will then elect the President of the Autonomous Region.

Before the dissolution of the regional parliament, incumbent president Miguel Albuquerque, since 2015, from the Social Democratic Party (PSD), led a coalition government between the Social Democrats and the CDS – People's Party, with the parliamentary support of People Animals Nature. The Social Democrats defended their dominance in the islands, which they have held since 1976.

The Social Democratic Party (PSD), marred in an ongoing corruption investigation, emerged, once again, as the winner with 36 percent of the votes, albeit losing one seat thus gathering 19 seats, but polling comfortably ahead of the second most voted party, the PS.

The Socialist Party (PS) suffered another big defeat by gathering basically the same number of votes and seats as in September 2023, 21 percent and eleven seats, thus making no gains from the Social Democrats situation. The Together for the People (JPP) can be considered as the big winner of the elections, by gathering 17 percent of the votes, very close with the Socialists, and winning 9 seats, four more than in 2023. The party was also the most voted in their stronghold of Santa Cruz.

Chega (CH) didn't make significant gains and won 9 percent of the votes and held on to the 4 seats won in September 2023. CDS – People's Party (CDS–PP), now running alone after their "quarrel" with the PSD, achieved 4 percent of the votes and won 2 seats, minus one they had in their 2023 coalition with the Social Democrats.

People-Animals-Nature (PAN) and the Liberal Initiative (IL) held on to their sole seats, while the Left Bloc (BE) lost their seat and left the regional assembly, as did the Unitary Democratic Coalition (CDU), which for the first time in 32 years failed to win a seat in the Madeira assembly.

The turnout in these elections was the same as in September 2023, with 53.4 percent of voters casting a ballot, compared with the 53.3 percent eight months before.

== Background ==
In the 2023 regional election, the We Are Madeira coalition (PSD/CDS–PP) was again the most voted coalition, 43 percent, but failed to win an absolute majority. After the elections, PSD and CDS–PP sought the parliamentary support from PAN, which guaranteed an absolute majority in the regional parliament.

=== 2024 corruption investigation ===
On 24 January 2024, the Judiciary Police and the Public Prosecutor's office conducted a series of searches at the official office of the President of the Region, at Funchal City Hall, at Miguel Albuquerque's private residence and in many private companies, regarding corruption and abuse of power accusations surrounding real estate businesses in the region. The mayor of Funchal, Pedro Calado, and two businessmen were arrested by the police. Miguel Albuquerque was named as formal suspect and was accused of several corruption, abuse of power and influence peddling crimes.

Miguel Albuquerque announced he would not resign as President and would defend himself against the accusations, although suggesting that he would ask his double immunity, granted as a member of the regional government and the Council of State, to be removed, pressing that he was innocent. Parties reacted by demanding Albuquerque's resignation, with People Animals Nature (PAN) threatening to tear apart the agreement between them and the PSD, if Albuquerque didn't resign. The Socialist Party (PS) and Chega announced intentions of submitting motions of no confidence against Albuquerque.

==== Fall of the government ====
On 26 January, Miguel Albuquerque announced he would resign as President of the regional government of Madeira. The PSD was expected to select a new leader that would become President of the Regional Government of Madeira. Following Albuquerque's resignation, PAN announced that it would continue to provide parliamentary support to PSD. However, divisions within the PSD meant that a consensus on a succession solution was not reached. The Representative of the Republic in Madeira, Ireneu Barreto, then started to hear parties represented in the regional Parliament. Opposition parties, PS, JPP, CH, PCP, IL and BE defended snap elections, while PSD, CDS–PP and PAN proposed the nomination of a new government.

On 17 February, the Representative of the Republic in Madeira announced that he would keep the government in office, in a caretaker capacity, until the President of Portugal decided whether there would be early elections or a new government under the current parliament. The parliament of Madeira could only be dissolved from 24 March 2024 onwards, six months after the last elections.

On 27 March, the President of Portugal decided to dissolve the regional parliament and call early elections for 26 May.

=== Leadership changes and challenges ===
==== Socialist Party ====
On 2 December 2023, a leadership election was held to replace Sérgio Gonçalves as the leader of PS Madeira. Paulo Cafôfo, by then Secretary of State for the Portuguese Communities and former Mayor of Funchal was the only candidate. He was elected with 98.6 percent of the votes.

Ballot: 2 December 2023
Candidate	Votes	%
Paulo Cafôfo	1,450	98.6
Blank/Invalid ballots	20	1.4
Turnout	1,470	
Source: DNotícias

==== Social Democratic Party ====
On 19 February 2024, Miguel Albuquerque announced that a PSD leadership election would be held on 21 March 2024, with himself being an almost certain candidate, which was later confirmed. The party also announced the end of their coalition with CDS–People's Party and would contest future elections alone. Manuel António Correia, former regional secretary of the Environment and Natural Resources from 2000 to 2015, announced his intention to run, being supported by former President Alberto João Jardim. On 21 March 2024, Albuquerque was reelected with 54 percent of the votes, against the 45 percent of António Correia. 4,388 party members were able to vote, just over a third of a total universe of more than 12,000 members, and of those able to vote, 94 percent cast a ballot. The results were the following:

Ballot: 21 March 2024
Candidate	Votes	%
Miguel Albuquerque	2,243	54.3
Manuel António Correia	1,856	44.9
Blank/Invalid ballots	33	0.8
Turnout	4,132	94.17
Source: Expresso

==== CDS – People's Party ====
On 20 February 2024, CDS–PP party leader and Regional Secretary for Economic Affairs, Rui Barreto, announced his resignation from the party leadership, and a leadership ballot was called for April. José Manuel Rodrigues, President of the Regional Assembly and former leader of CDS–PP Madeira (1997–2018), announced his intention to run for the leadership. On 14 April 2024, José Manuel Rodrigues was easily elected as party leader with 76 percent of the delegates votes:

Ballot: 14 April 2024
Candidate	Votes	%
José Manuel Rodrigues	129	75.9
Blank/Invalid ballots	41	24.1
Turnout	170	
Source: DNotícias

== Electoral system ==
The current 47 members of the Madeiran regional parliament are elected in a single constituency by proportional representation under the D'Hondt method, coinciding with the territory of the Region.

== Parties ==
=== Composition ===
The table below lists parties represented in the Legislative Assembly of Madeira before the election.

Name		Ideology	Leader	2023 result	
Name		Ideology	Leader	%	Seats
PPD/PSD	Social Democratic Party; Partido Social Democrata	Liberal conservatism	Miguel Albuquerque	43.1%	20 / 47
CDS–PP	CDS – People's Party; Centro Democrático Social – Partido Popular	Conservatism	José Manuel Rodrigues	43.1%	3 / 47
PS	Socialist Party; Partido Socialista	Social democracy	Paulo Cafôfo	21.3%	11 / 47
JPP	Together for the People; Juntos pelo Povo	Social liberalism	Élvio Sousa	11.0%	5 / 47
CH	Enough! Chega!	National conservatism	Miguel Castro	8.9%	4 / 47
PCP	Portuguese Communist Party; Partido Comunista Português	Communism	Edgar Silva	2.7% (Note: The Portuguese Communist Party (PCP) and the Ecologist Party "The Greens" (PEV) contested the 2023 election jointly as the Unitary Democratic Coalition, and won a combined 2.7% of the vote and elected 1 MP to parliament.)	1 / 47
IL	Liberal Initiative; Iniciativa Liberal	Classical liberalism	Nuno Morna	2.6%	1 / 47
PAN	People Animals Nature; Pessoas Animais Natureza	Animal welfare	Mónica Freitas	2.2%	1 / 47
BE	Left Bloc; Bloco de Esquerda	Democratic socialism	Roberto Almada	2.2%	1 / 47

=== Parties running in the election ===
14 parties and/or coalitions were on the ballot for the 2024 Madeira regional election. The parties and/or coalitions that contested the election and their lead candidates were: (parties/coalitions are ordered by how they appeared on the ballot paper)

- National Democratic Alternative (ADN), Miguel Pita
- Left Bloc (BE), Roberto Almada
- Socialist Party (PS), Paulo Cafôfo
- LIVRE (L), Marta Sofia
- Liberal Initiative (IL), Nuno Morna
- React, Include, Recycle (RIR), Liana Reis
- Unitary Democratic Coalition (CDU), Edgar Silva
- Enough (CH), Miguel Castro
- CDS – People's Party (CDS–PP), José Manuel Rodrigues
- Earth Party (MPT), Valter Rodrigues
- Social Democratic Party (PSD), Miguel Albuquerque
- People-Animals-Nature (PAN), Mónica Freitas
- Portuguese Labour Party (PTP), Raquel Coelho
- Together for the People (JPP), Élvio Sousa

== Campaign ==
=== Issues ===
The campaign was dominated by issues like housing, poverty and lack of freedoms in Madeira, with some parties accusing the PSD of coercing public employees. The stability of the next regional government was also a big issue in the campaign, with Miguel Albuquerque being rejected by all parties, due to his ongoing corruption accusations, and with the Socialists hoping to forge a "contraption" with left wing parties, in order to end the Social Democrats 48 years in power.

=== Party slogans ===
Party or alliance	Original slogan	English translation	Refs
PSD	« Sempre pela Madeira »	"Always for Madeira"	
PS	« Vamos virar a página »	"Let's turn the page"	
JPP	« Este é o momento »	"This is the moment"	
CH	« A Madeira tem mesmo de mudar »	"Madeira really needs to change"	
CDS–PP	« Um voto seguro »	"A safe vote"	
CDU	« Alternativa necessária »	"Necessary alternative"	
IL	« Fazer a diferença »	"Make the difference"	
PAN	« Força da natureza »	"Force of nature"	
BE	« Gente de confiança »	"Trustworthy people"	

=== Election debates ===
2024 Madeiran regional election debates
Date	Organisers	Moderator	P Present (Note: Denotes a main invitee attending the event.) S Surrogate (Note: Denotes a main invitee not attending the event, sending a surrogate in their place.) NI Not invited I Invited A Absent invitee														
Date	Organisers	Moderator	PSD	PS	JPP	CH	CDS-PP	CDU	IL	PAN	BE	PTP	L	RIR	MPT	ADN	Ref.
14 May	RTP Madeira	Gil Rosa	NI	NI	NI	NI	NI	NI	NI	NI	NI	P Coelho	P Sofia	P Reis	P Valter	P Pita	
15 May	RTP Madeira	Gil Rosa	NI	NI	NI	NI	NI	P Silva	P Morna	P Freitas	P Almada	NI	NI	NI	NI	NI	
16 May	RTP Madeira	Gil Rosa	P Albuquerque	P Cafôfo	P Sousa	P Castro	P Rodrigues	NI	NI	NI	NI	NI	NI	NI	NI	NI	

== Opinion polls ==
Polls that show their results without distributing those respondents who are undecided or said they would abstain from voting, are re-calculated by removing these numbers from the totals through a simple rule of three, in order to obtain results comparable to other polls and the official election results.

Exit poll

Polling firm/Link	Fieldwork date	Sample size	Turnout	PSD	CDS–PP	PS		CH	CDU	IL	PAN	BE	L	O	Lead
2024 regional election	26 May 2024	—N/a	53.4	36.1; 19	4.0; 2	21.3; 11	16.9; 9	9.2; 4	1.6; 0	2.6; 1	1.9; 1	1.4; 0	0.7; 0	4.3; 0	14.8
CESOP–UCP	26 May 2024	10,057	51–56	33–38; 16/21	2–5; 1/2	21–25; 11/14	16–19; 7/10	8–10; 3/5	1–3; 0/1	1–3; 1	1–3; 0/1	1–3; 0/1	—N/a	—N/a	12; 13
Aximage	10–17 May 2024	609	?	38.1; 20	2.7; 1	20.6; 11	16.0; 8	10.8; 5	1.5; 0	3.1; 1	1.6; 0	2.4; 1	0.8; 0	2.4; 0	17.5
2024 legislative election	10 Mar 2024	—N/a	58.9	35.4 (19)		19.8 (10)	9.6 (5)	17.6 (9)	1.6 (0)	3.9 (2)	2.1 (1)	2.9 (1)	1.2 (0)	5.9 (0)	15.6
Intercampus (Note: Results presented here exclude undecideds (25.2%). With their inclusion results are: PSD: 29.7%; PS: 21.2%; JPP: 7.1%; CH 5.5%; IL: 4.5%; CDU: 2.5%; PAN: 1.0%; CDS-PP: 0.8%; Others/Invalid: 2.5%)	26 Feb–3 Mar 2024	401	?	39.7; 21	1.1; 0	28.3; 14	9.5; 5	7.4; 3	3.3; 1	6.0; 3	1.3; 0	—N/a	0.4; 0	2.9; 0	11.4
2023 regional election	24 Sep 2023	—N/a	53.3	43.1; 23		21.3; 11	11.0; 5	8.9; 4	2.7; 1	2.6; 1	2.2; 1	2.2; 1	0.6; 0	5.4; 0	21.8

== Voter turnout ==
The table below shows voter turnout throughout election day.

Turnout	Time								
Turnout	12:00			16:00			19:00		
Turnout	2023	2024	±	2023	2024	±	2023	2024	±
Total	20.98%	20.22%	▼0.76 pp	39.90%	40.52%	▲0.62 pp	53.35%	53.40%	▲0.05 pp

== Results ==
Summary of the 26 May 2024 Legislative Assembly of Madeira elections results
Parties	Votes	%	±pp swing	MPs				
Parties	Votes	%	±pp swing	2023	2024	±	%	±
Social Democratic	49,104	36.13		20	19	▼1	40.43	▼2.1
Socialist	28,981	21.32	0.0	11	11	0	23.40	0.0
Together for the People	22,959	16.89	▲5.9	5	9	▲4	19.15	▲8.5
Chega	12,562	9.24	▲0.3	4	4	0	8.51	0.0
People's	5,374	3.95		3	2	▼1	4.26	▼2.1
Liberal Initiative	3,481	2.56	0.0	1	1	0	2.13	0.0
People-Animals-Nature	2,531	1.86	▼0.4	1	1	0	2.13	0.0
Unitary Democratic Coalition	2,217	1.63	▼1.1	1	0	▼1	0.00	▼2.1
Left Bloc	1,912	1.41	▼0.8	1	0	▼1	0.00	▼2.1
Labour	1,222	0.90	▼0.1	0	0	0	0.00	0.0
LIVRE	905	0.67	▲0.1	0	0	0	0.00	0.0
National Democratic Alternative	772	0.57	▲0.1	0	0	0	0.00	0.0
Earth	577	0.42	▼0.1	0	0	0	0.00	0.0
React, Include, Recycle	527	0.39	▼0.1	0	0	0	0.00	0.0
Total valid	133,124	97.95	▼0.7	47	47	0	100.00	0.0
Blank ballots	612	0.45	▼0.2					
Invalid ballots	2,181	1.60	▼0.5					
Total	135,917	100.00						
Registered voters/turnout	254,522	53.40	▲0.1					

Vote share
PSD	36.13%
PS	21.32%
JPP	16.89%
CH	9.24%
CDS–PP	3.95%
IL	2.56%
PAN	1.86%
CDU	1.63%
BE	1.41%
Others	2.95%
Blank/Invalid	2.05%

Parliamentary seats
PSD	40.43%
PS	23.40%
JPP	19.15%
CH	8.51%
CDS–PP	4.26%
IL	2.13%
PAN	2.13%

=== Maps ===
Most voted political force by municipality.

== Aftermath ==
On election night, Miguel Albuquerque, PSD leader, said the Social Democrats had a clear victory, that the leftwing had a "copious defeat" and that the party was ready to govern in dialogue with other parties. Socialist Party leader Paulo Cafôfo said that the results showed that an alternative government was possible. Together for the People (JPP), considered the big winners of the election, said that stability scenarios were on the making and asked for the confidence of voters. Other parties, however, didn't seem willing into supporting either Albuquerque or Cafôfo, with Chega suggesting that only the resignation of Albuquerque would allow Chega to support the PSD; CDS–PP not open to coalitions but to dialogue case by case with the PSD, and rejecting any deal with the Socialists, the same position as the Liberal Initiative; PAN said they would be a constructive force in Parliament.

On the day after election day, on 27 May, PS and JPP announced a compromise to propose an alternative government and called on other parties to join them. The Liberal Initiative rejected any possibility of joining the PS and JPP compromise. On the next day, on 28 May, PSD and CDS–PP reached a deal, plus assured the abstention of Chega. After meeting with parties represented in the regional assembly, also during 28 May, the Representative of the Republic, Ireneu Barreto, nominated Miguel Albuquerque as President of the Regional Government. The new government was sworn in on 6 June 2024.

The government programme was given to the Regional Parliament, by Albuquerque, on 14 June and was set to be discussed and voted during three days, between 18 and 20 June 2024. However, despite previous certainties given by Miguel Albuquerque, there were doubts if the programme would pass in the Regional Parliament as Chega announced they would vote against it, alongside the Socialists. JPP, shortly after, also announced its vote against the programme. With an imminent rejection, Albuquerque withdrew, on 19 June, his programme from the assembly and announced negotiations to present a new one, thus cancelling the 20 June vote. After several days of negotiations with Opposition parties, mainly Chega, IL, CDS–PP and PAN, Miguel Albuquerque presented, on 2 July, a second government programme that was set to be discussed and voted on 4 July, however with its fate being seen as unclear.

=== Government approval ===
On 4 July 2024, the regional assembly approved the PSD minority government with the votes in favour of PSD, CDS–PP and PAN; PS, JPP and one Chega member Magna Costa voting against; and the abstention of IL and the remaining three members from Chega.

2024 Motion of confidence Miguel Albuquerque (PSD)
Ballot →	4 July 2024
Required majority →	Simple
Yes: • PSD (19); • CDS–PP (2); • PAN (1)	22 / 47
No: • PS (11); • JPP (9); • CH (1)	21 / 47
Abstentions: • CH (3); • IL (1)	4 / 47
Absentees	0 / 47
Result →	Approved

=== 2024 motion of no confidence ===
On 6 November 2024, just four months after the approval of Albuquerque's government by the regional assembly, Chega presented a motion of no confidence to bring down Miguel Albuquerque. The reasons for the motion were the continued accusations, and investigations, of corruption against several regional secretaries and Albuquerque himself. However, the Chega motion also criticized the Socialist Party (PS) for being an "accomplice" of the Social Democrats bad government. This reference created divisions within the PS on what should be the Socialist's position, with many members divided between the vote in favour or to abstain. Shortly after, Chega said it was open to drop the criticisms towards the PS, and then the PS signaled it would vote in favour of the motion, which was later officially confirmed. The motion was expected to be voted on 18 November, but a PSD request to delay the vote was approved and the motion was postponed to 17 December 2024. One week before the motion of no confidence vote, on 9 December, the proposed regional budget for 2025 was rejected on the first reading with the votes of all Opposition parties and the approval of only PSD and CDS–PP. On 17 December, the motion of no confidence was approved with the votes of all Opposition parties and the sole rejection of PSD and CDS–PP, causing the fall of Albuquerque's regional government:

2024 Motion of no confidence Miguel Albuquerque (PSD)
Ballot →	17 December 2024
Required majority →	24 out of 47
No: • PSD (19); • CDS–PP (2)	21 / 47
Yes: • PS (11); • JPP (9); • CH (4); • IL (1); • PAN (1)	26 / 47
Abstentions	0 / 47
Absentees	0 / 47
Result →	Approved

After the approval of the motion, the Representative of the Republic in Madeira, Ireneu Barreto, met with all parties represented in the regional assembly, and all parties defended snap elections. After also meeting with parties represented in the regional assembly and hearing the Council of State, President Marcelo Rebelo de Sousa dissolved, on 17 January 2025, the regional parliament and called an election for 23 March 2025.
