= 2023 Madeiran regional election =

Portuguese regional election

- 24 September 2023

47 seats to the Legislative Assembly of Madeira 24 seats needed for a majority
- Opinion polls
- Turnout: 53.3% ▼2.2 pp
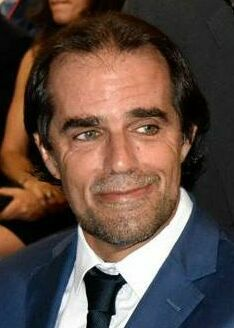

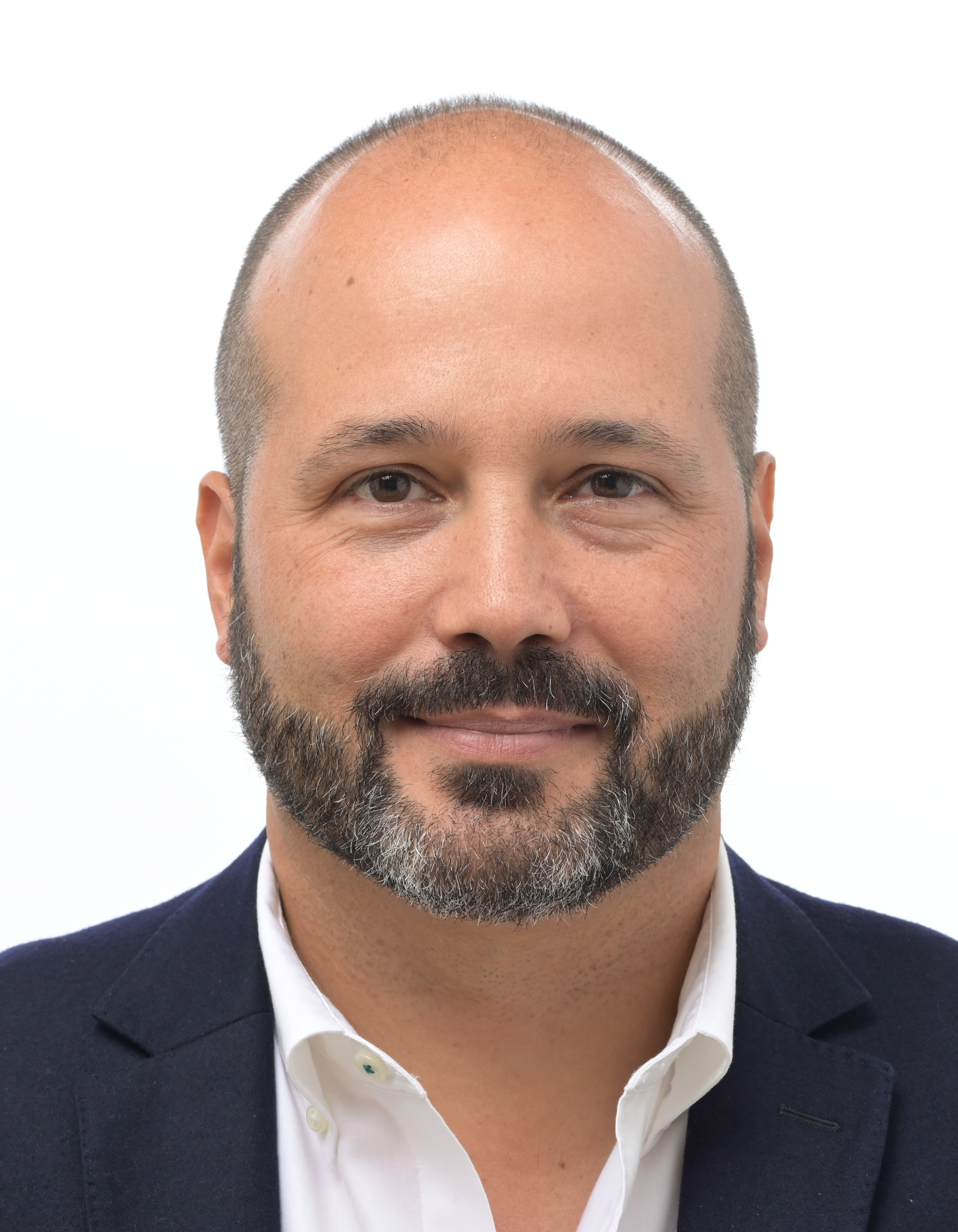

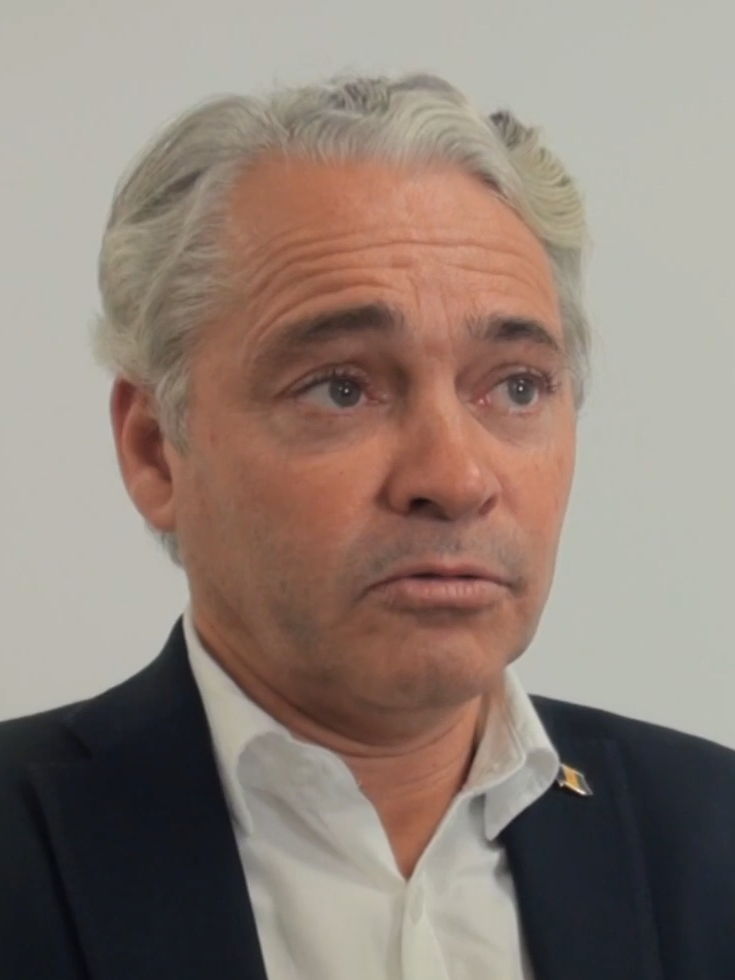

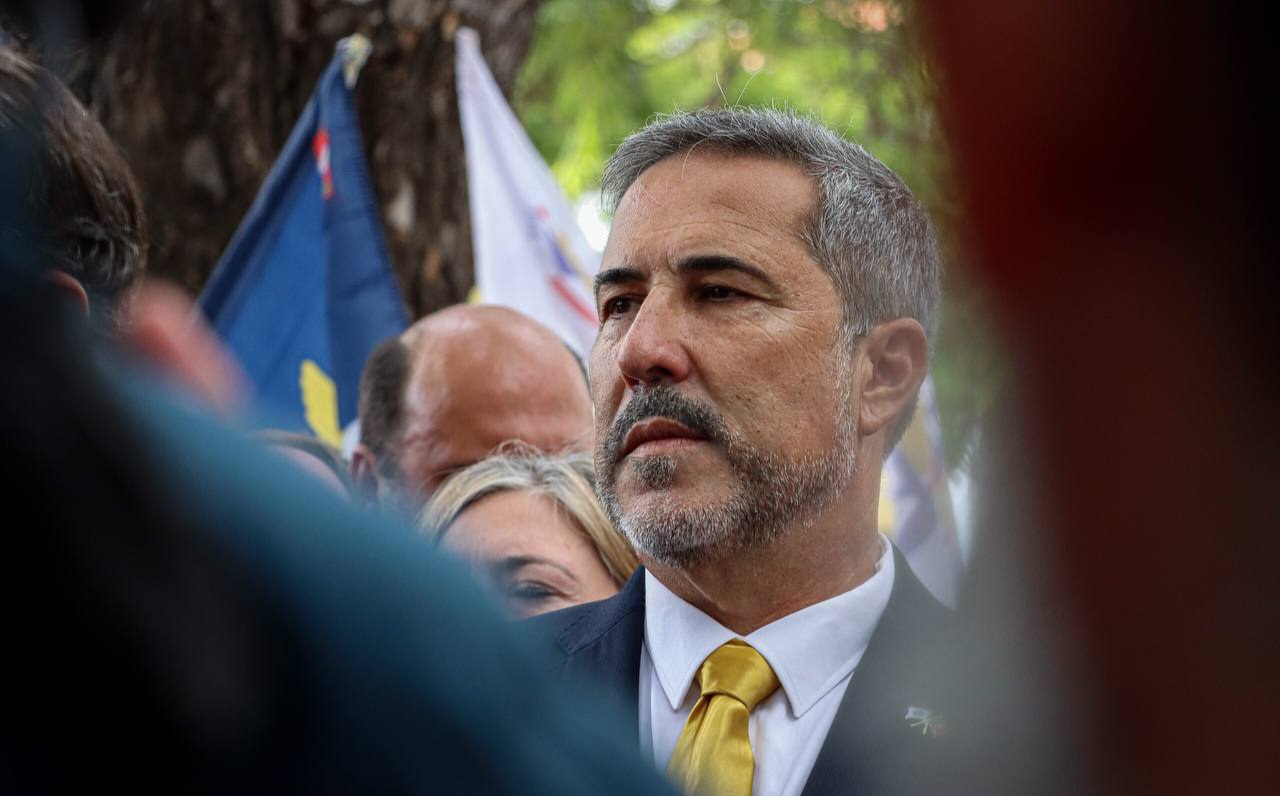

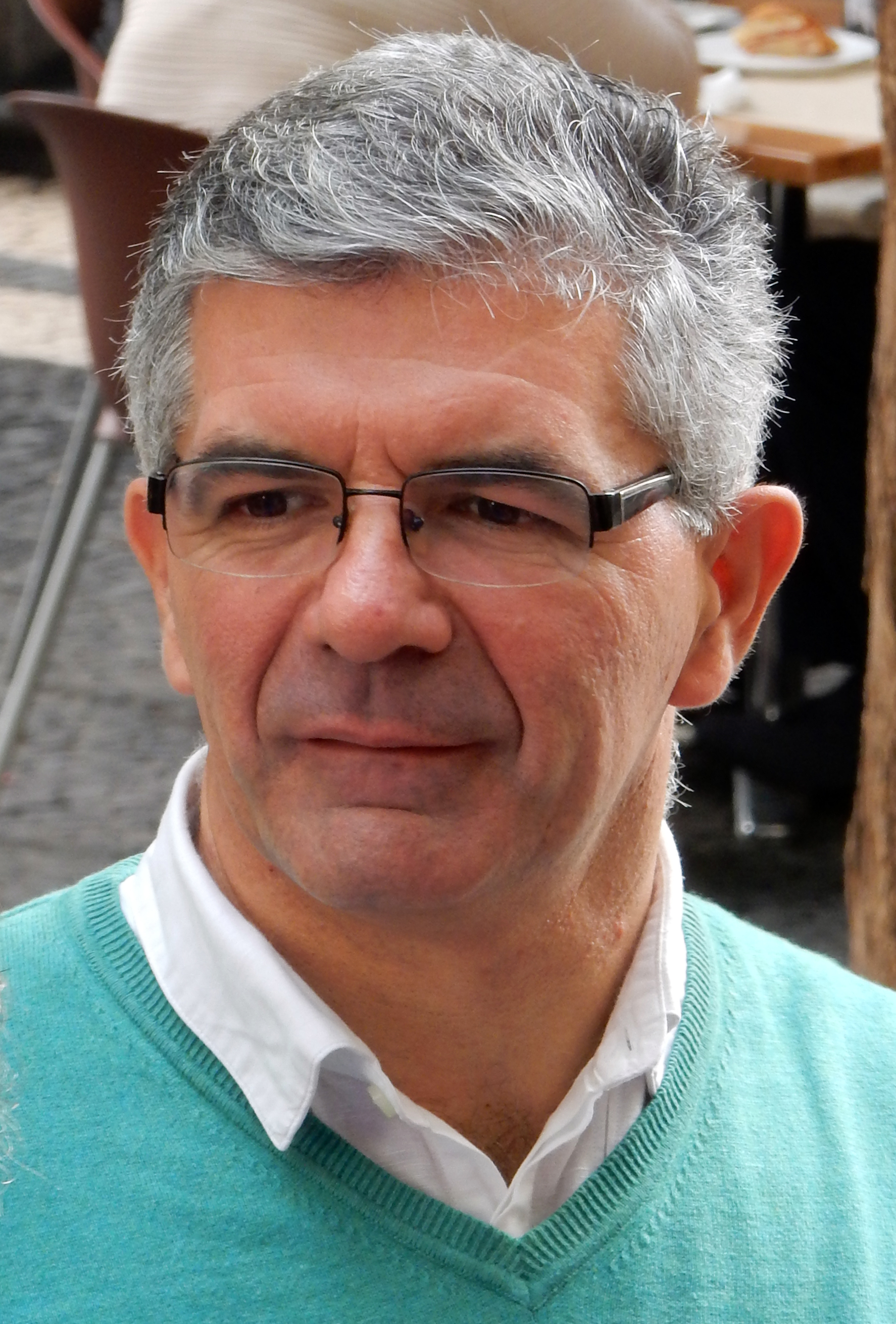

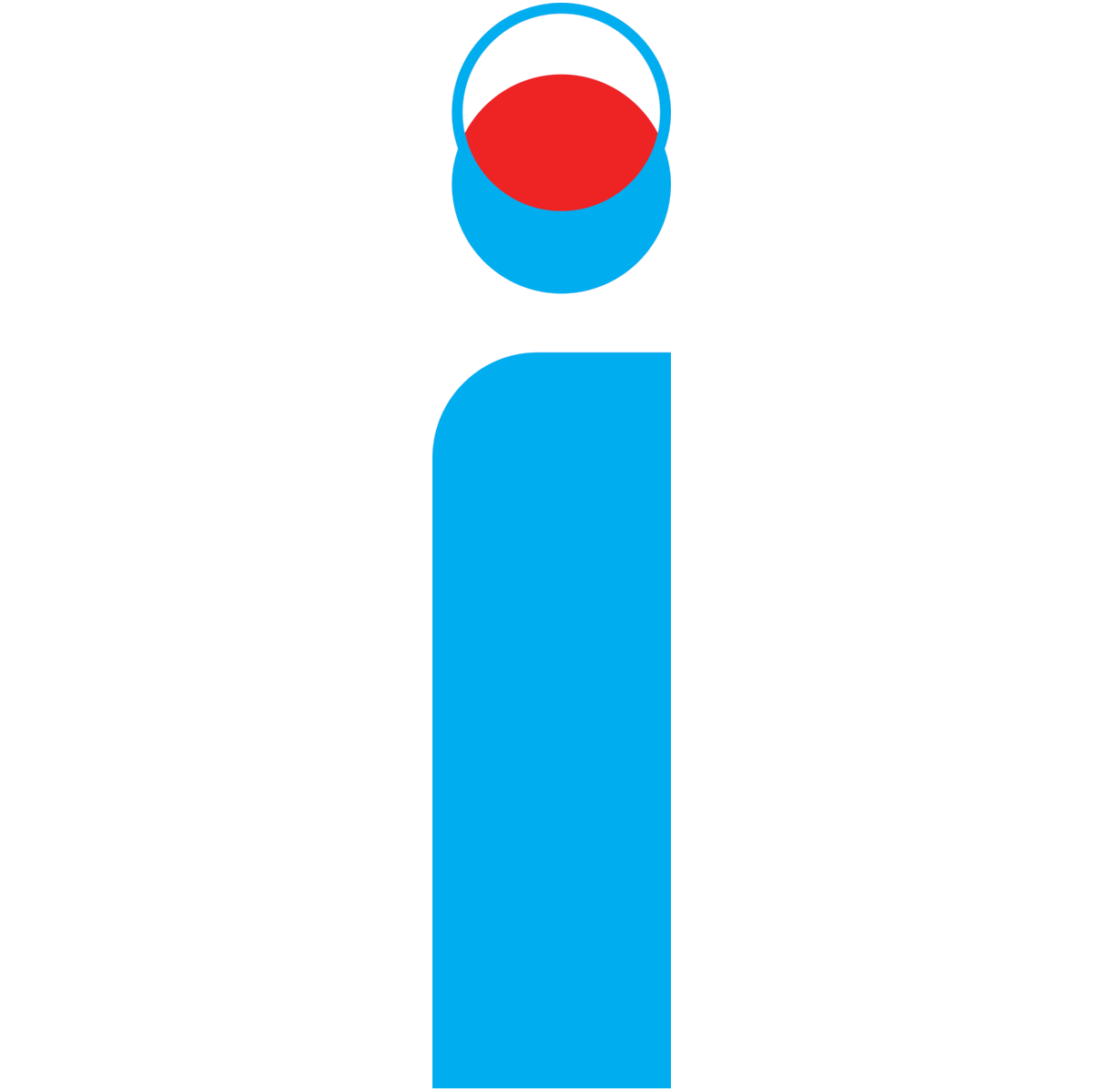

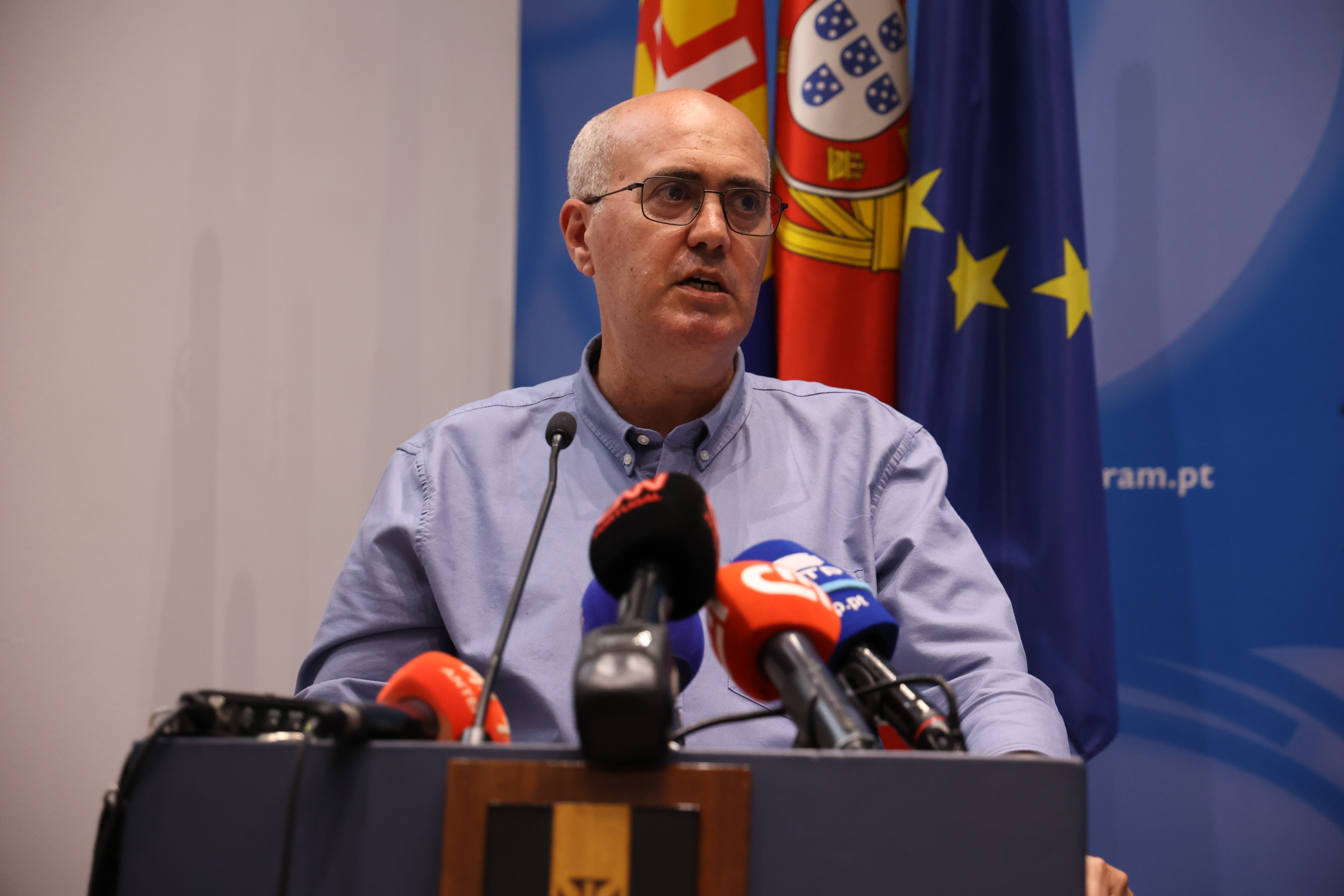
	First party	Second party	Third party
Leader	Miguel Albuquerque	Sérgio Gonçalves	Élvio Sousa
Party	PSD	PS	JPP
Alliance	We Are Madeira
Leader since	10 January 2015 (Note: As leader of the Social Democratic Party (PSD). The leader of the Madeira People's Party (CDS–PP) is the Regional Secretary for Economic Affairs Rui Barreto.)	13 March 2022	27 January 2015
Last election	24 seats, 45.2% (Note: Sum of votes and seats of the PSD and the CDS–PP in the 2019 election. PSD: 39.4%, 21 seats; CDS–PP: 5.8%, 3 seats.)	19 seats, 35.8%	3 seats, 5.5%
Seats won	23	11	5
Seat change	▼1	▼8	▲2
Popular vote	58,394	28,840	14,933
Percentage	43.1%	21.3%	11.0%
Swing	▼2.1 pp	▼14.5 pp	▲5.5 pp
	Fourth party	Fifth party	Sixth party
Leader	Miguel Castro	Edgar Silva	Nuno Morna
Party	CH	PCP	IL
Alliance		CDU
Leader since	12 March 2022	1996	2019
Last election	0 seats, 0.4%	1 seats, 1.8%	0 seats, 0.5%
Seats won	4	1	1
Seat change	▲4	0	▲1
Popular vote	12,029	3,677	3,555
Percentage	8.9%	2.7%	2.6%
Swing	▲8.5 pp	▲0.9 pp	▲1.1 pp
	Seventh party	Eighth party
Leader	Mónica Freitas	Roberto Almada
Party	PAN	BE
Leader since	11 August 2023	18 March 2023
Last election	0 seats, 1.5%	0 seats, 1.7%
Seats won	1	1
Seat change	▲1	▲1
Popular vote	3,046	3,035
Percentage	2.2%	2.2%
Swing	▲0.6 pp	▲0.5 pp
President before election
Miguel Albuquerque
PSD
Elected President
Miguel Albuquerque
PSD

Regional elections were held in Madeira on 24 September 2023, to determine the composition of the Legislative Assembly of the Autonomous Region of Madeira. The election replaced all 47 members of the Madeira Assembly, and the new members will then elect the President of the Autonomous Region.

The incumbent president, Miguel Albuquerque from the Social Democratic Party (PSD), led a coalition government between the Social Democrats and the CDS – People's Party, and defended the dominance of the Social Democratic Party in the islands since 1976. The PSD and CDS–PP contested the election in a joint coalition.

The "We are Madeira" coalition, between the Social Democratic Party (PSD) and the CDS – People's Party (CDS–PP), won the election with 43 percent of the votes but, despite polling predictions, failed to hold on to their majority and won 23 seats, one short of a majority. On election night, Miguel Albuquerque announced he would present a "parliamentary majority solution" very shortly, but didn't give much details nor said with whom, although he refused any talks with Chega.

The Socialist Party (PS) suffered a big fall in support gathering just 21 percent of the votes and 11 seats, compared with their best results ever in 2019, almost 36 percent and 19 seats. Unlike 2019, it failed to win a single parish and municipality. Together for the People (JPP) had their best showing ever, winning 11 percent of the votes and 5 seats, two more compared with 2019.

Unitary Democratic Coalition (CDU) was able to hold on to their sole seat and even increased their share of vote to 2.7 percent, compared with the 1.8 percent in 2019. Chega (CH), which faced legal disputes regarding their presence on the ballot due to annulments of internal party decisions and that were settled with a Constitutional Court ruling that confirmed that the party could be on the ballot, had a very strong showing, winning almost 9 percent of the votes and electing 4 members to the regional parliament, a 8.5 percent growth compared with 2019.

The Liberal Initiative (IL) won 2.6 percent of the votes and elected one seat. The regional leader, Nuno Morna said he was open to talks with the PSD/CDS–PP coalition. Likewise, People-Animals-Nature (PAN), which won 2.2 percent of the votes and returned after 8 years to the regional parliament, was also open to supporting a PSD/CDS–PP government. Left Bloc (BE) polled 2.2 percent and also returned to the Madeira Parliament after losing their seat in 2019.

Two days after the election, PAN and the PSD/CDS–PP signed a deal that ensured a majority in the regional Parliament. PSD/CDS–PP accepted a series of PAN demands and Miguel Albuquerque said he was "very pleased" by the outcome of the deal. Also, Albuquerque didn't rule out occasional agreements with the Liberal Initiative.

The turnout in these elections decreased compared to the previous one, with 53.3 percent of voters casting a ballot, compared with the 55.5 percent in the 2019 elections.

== Background ==
In the 2019 regional election, the PSD was again the most voted party, 39 percent, but failed for the first time to win an absolute majority. The party was followed closely by the PS which polled at almost 36 percent. After the elections, PSD and CDS–PP formed a coalition government which guaranteed an absolute majority in the regional parliament.

=== Leadership changes and challenges ===
==== Socialist Party ====
In the aftermath of the 2021 local elections, in which the PS lost a lot of ground, especially the loss of Funchal to a PSD/CDS–PP coalition, the then PS leader Paulo Cafôfo resigned from the leadership and refused to run again. In the following PS leadership election, in February 2022, Sérgio Gonçalves was elected as the new leader with nearly 99 percent of the votes.

Ballot: 19 February 2022
Candidate	Votes	%
Sérgio Gonçalves	1,095	98.6
Blank/Invalid ballots	15	1.4
Turnout	1,110	67.18

== Electoral system ==
The current 47 members of the Madeiran regional parliament are elected in a single constituency by proportional representation under the D'Hondt method, coinciding with the territory of the Region.

== Parties ==
=== Current composition ===
The table below lists parties represented in the Legislative Assembly of Madeira before the election.

Name		Ideology	Leader	2019 result	
Name		Ideology	Leader	%	Seats
PPD/PSD	Social Democratic Party; Partido Social Democrata	Liberal conservatism	Miguel Albuquerque	39.4%	21 / 47
PS	Socialist Party; Partido Socialista	Social democracy	Sérgio Gonçalves	35.8%	19 / 47
CDS–PP	CDS – People's Party; Centro Democrático Social – Partido Popular	Conservatism	Rui Barreto	5.8%	3 / 47
JPP	Together for the People; Juntos pelo Povo	Social liberalism	Élvio Sousa	5.5%	3 / 47
PCP	Portuguese Communist Party; Partido Comunista Português	Communism	Edgar Silva	1.8% (Note: The Portuguese Communist Party (PCP) and the Ecologist Party "The Greens" (PEV) contested the 2019 election jointly as the Unitary Democratic Coalition, and won a combined 1.8% of the vote and elected 1 MP to parliament.)	1 / 47

=== Parties running in the election ===
13 parties/coalitions were on the ballot for the 2023 Madeira regional election. The parties/coalitions that contested the election and their lead candidates were: (parties/coalitions are ordered by the way they appeared on the ballot)

- Portuguese Labour Party (PTP), Quintino Costa
- Together for the People (JPP), Élvio Sousa
- Left Bloc (BE), Roberto Almada
- Socialist Party (PS), Sérgio Gonçalves
- Enough (CH), Miguel Castro
- React, Include, Recycle (RIR), Roberto Vieira
- Earth Party (MPT), Valter Rodrigues
- National Democratic Alternative (ADN), Miguel Pita
- Social Democratic Party/CDS – People's Party We are Madeira coalition (PSD/CDS–PP), Miguel Albuquerque
- People-Animals-Nature (PAN), Mónica Freitas
- LIVRE (L), Tiago Camacho
- Unitary Democratic Coalition (CDU), Edgar Silva
- Liberal Initiative (IL), Nuno Morna

== Campaign period ==
=== Party slogans ===
Party or alliance	Original slogan	English translation	Refs
PSD/CDS–PP	« Somos Madeira »	"We are Madeira"	
PS	« O voto que muda a Madeira »	"The vote that changes Madeira"	
JPP	« Em frente. Sem medo! »	"Forward. Without fear!"	
CDU	« Viver melhor na nossa terra! »	"Live better in our land!"	
BE	« O Bloco faz falta »	"The Bloc is needed"	
PAN	« O voto que faz a diferença »	"The vote that makes the difference"	
IL	« O liberalismo funciona. E faz falta à Madeira »	"Liberalism works. And Madeira needs it"	
CH	« Vamos acabar com a corrupção na Madeira! »	"Let's end corruption in Madeira!"	

=== Election debates ===
2023 Madeiran regional election debates
Date	Organisers	Moderator	P Present (Note: Denotes a main invitee attending the event.) S Surrogate (Note: Denotes a main invitee not attending the event, sending a surrogate in their place.) NI Not invited I Invited A Absent invitee													
Date	Organisers	Moderator	PSD/CDS	PS	JPP	CDU	BE	PAN	RIR	PTP	IL	CH	ADN	MPT	L	Ref.
24 Aug	RTP Madeira	Gil Rosa	NI	NI	NI	NI	NI	NI	NI	NI	P Morna	A	P Pita	P Rodrigues	P Camacho	
31 Aug	RTP Madeira	Gil Rosa	NI	NI	NI	NI	P Almada	P Freitas	P Vieira	P Costa	NI	NI	NI	NI	NI	
7 Sep	RTP Madeira	Gil Rosa	P Albuquerque	P Gonçalves	P Sousa	P Silva	NI	NI	NI	NI	NI	NI	NI	NI	NI	

== Opinion polls ==
=== Graphical summary ===
View source data.

=== Polling ===
Polls that showed their results without distributing those respondents who were undecided or said they would abstain from voting, were re-calculated by removing those numbers from the totals through a simple rule of three, in order to obtain results comparable to other polls and the official election results.
Exit poll

Polling firm/Link	Fieldwork date	Sample size	Turnout	PSD/CDS		PS		CDU	BE	PAN	IL	CH	O	Lead
Polling firm/Link	Fieldwork date	Sample size	Turnout	PSD	CDS–PP	PS		CDU	BE	PAN	IL	CH	O	Lead
2023 regional election	24 Sep 2023	—N/a	53.3	43.1; 23		21.3; 11	11.0; 5	2.7; 1	2.2; 1	2.3; 1	2.6; 1	8.9; 4	4.9; 0	21.8
CESOP–UCP	24 Sep 2023	8,021	52–56	44–48; 23/26		18–21; 9/12	9–12; 4/6	2–3; 1	2–3; 1	1–3; 0/1	2–4; 1	8–10; 3/5		26.5
CESOP–UCP	16–17 Sep 2023	1,613	?	50.0; 24/28		23.0; 10/13	7.0; 2/4	2.0; 0/1	3.0; 1/2	1.5; 0/1	1.5; 0/1	7.0; 2/4	5.0; 0	27.0
Intercampus (Note: Results presented here exclude undecideds (29.3%). With their inclusion results are: PSD/CDS-PP: 34.6%; PS: 16.1%; JPP: 6.7%; CH: 4.8%; IL: 2.1%; BE: 1.2%; CDU: 1.2%; BE: PAN%; Others/Invalid: 3.2%.)	29 Aug–13 Sep 2023	603	?	49.0; 26		22.8; 12	9.5; 5	1.7; 0	1.7; 0	1.0; 0	3.0; 1	6.8; 3	4.5; 0	26.2
Aximage (Note: Results presented here exclude undecideds (9.5%). With their inclusion results are: PSD/CDS-PP: 52.9%; PS: 14.0%; JPP: 7.6%; CH: 4.1%; IL: 4.1%; CDU: 2.9%; PAN: 1.7%; BE: 1.5%; Others/Invalid: 1.7%.)	28 Aug–10 Sep 2023	602	?	58.4; 30		15.5; 8	8.4; 4	3.2; 1	1.7; 0	1.9; 0	4.5; 2	4.5; 2	1.9; 0	42.9
Metris	21–26 Aug 2023	402	?	52.5; 24/28		21.5; 10/14	10.0; 4/6	1.1; 0/1	1.1; 0/1	1.5; 0/1	3.8; 1/2	6.1; 2/4	2.4; 0	31.0
Aximage (Note: Results presented here exclude undecideds (13.3%). With their inclusion results are: PSD/CDS-PP: 49.6%; PS: 13.5%; JPP: 8.7%; CH: 4.1%; IL: 3.0%; CDU: 1.7%; BE: 1.4%; PAN: 1.3%; Others/Invalid: 3.4%.)	10–23 Jul 2023	611	?	57.2; 30		15.6; 8	10.0; 5	2.0; 1	1.6; 0	1.5; 0	3.5; 1	4.7; 2	3.9; 0	41.6
Aximage (Note: Results presented here exclude undecideds (13.1%). With their inclusion results are: PSD/CDS-PP: 46.9%; PS: 14.6%; JPP: 10.1%; CH: 4.2%; BE: 2.3%; IL: 2.3%; PAN: 1.7%; CDU: 1.1%; Others/Invalid: 3.7%.)	23 May–5 Jun 2023	604	?	54.0; 28		16.8; 8	11.6; 6	1.3; 0	2.6; 1	2.0; 1	2.6; 1	4.8; 2	4.3; 0	37.2
Intercampus (Note: Results presented here exclude undecideds (23.6%). With their inclusion results are: PSD/CDS-PP: 34.3%; PS: 21.8%; JPP: 6.0%; CH: 4.7%; IL: 3.6%; PAN: 1.6%; CDU: 1.3%; BE: 0.8%; Others/Invalid: 3.0%.)	15–24 May 2023	404	?	44.9; 23		28.5; 14	7.9; 4	1.7; 0	1.0; 0	2.1; 1	4.7; 2	6.2; 3	3.0; 0	16.4
Aximage (Note: Results presented here exclude undecideds (9.0%). With their inclusion results are: PSD/CDS-PP: 50.0%; PS: 15.3%; JPP: 12.6%; CH: 3.3%; IL: 2.9%; CDU: 1.7%; BE: 1.3%; PAN: 0.8%; Others/Invalid: 3.1%.)	14–24 Feb 2023	603	?	55.0; 29		16.8; 8	13.8; 7	1.9; 1	1.4; 0	0.9; 0	3.2; 1	3.6; 1	3.4; 0	38.2
Intercampus (Note: Results presented here exclude undecideds + non voters (25.4% + 3.2%). With their inclusion results are: PSD/CDS-PP: 32.2%; PS: 21.0%; JPP: 6.0%; CH: 4.8%; IL: 3.0%; BE: 1.5%; PAN: 1.2%; CDU: 0.8%; Others/Invalid: 0.8%.) (Note: Results presented here exclude undecideds + non voters (24.0% + 3.8%). With their inclusion results are: PSD: 32.2%; PS: 21.8%; JPP: 6.0%; CH: 4.5%; IL: 2.0%; BE: 2.0%; CDS-PP: 1.2%; CDU: 1.0%; PAN: 0.8%; Others/Invalid: 0.8%.)	20–30 Jan 2023	400	?	45.2		29.5	8.4	1.1	2.1	1.7	4.2	6.7	1.1	15.7
Intercampus	20–30 Jan 2023	400	?	44.7	1.7	30.2	8.3	1.4	2.8	1.1	2.8	6.2	1.1	14.5
Aximage (Note: Results presented here exclude undecideds (17.9%). With their inclusion results are: PSD/CDS-PP: 44.3%; PS: 21.8%; JPP: 7.7%; CH: 2.2%; IL: 1.9%; CDU: 0.9%; BE: 0.7%; PAN: 0.2%; Others/Invalid: 2.4%.) (Note: Results presented here exclude undecideds (16.0%). With their inclusion results are: PSD: 43.3%; PS: 21.1%; JPP: 7.5%; CDS-PP: 4.4%; CH: 2.2%; IL: 1.9%; CDU: 0.9%; BE: 0.7%; PAN: 0.2%; Others/Invalid: 2.4%.)	14–26 Oct 2022	601	58.4	54.0		26.6	9.4	1.1	0.9	0.2	2.3	2.7	2.9	27.4
Aximage	14–26 Oct 2022	601	58.4	51.5	5.2	25.1	8.9	0.7	0.8	0.2	2.0	2.6	2.7	26.4
Aximage	30 Jul–5 Aug 2022	414	65.9	50.1		18.6	10.1	1.5	1.9	1.9	3.3	4.1	8.5	31.5
Aximage	30 Jul–5 Aug 2022	414	65.9	52.6	1.9	17.3	9.2	1.7	1.9	1.1	2.5	3.2	8.6	35.3
2022 legislative elections	30 Jan 2022	—N/a	49.6	39.8 (21)		31.5 (17)	6.9 (3)	2.0 (1)	3.2 (1)	1.6 (0)	3.3 (1)	6.1 (3)	5.2 (0)	8.3
2021 local elections	26 Sep 2021	—N/a	54.6	43.0 (23)	3.4 (1)	29.5 (16)	10.0 (5)	2.0 (1)	—N/a	—N/a	1.2 (0)	2.5 (1)	8.4 (0)	13.5
Aximage	5–8 Jun 2020	415	?	42.2	2.3	27.5	—N/a	2.1	2.1	—N/a	—N/a	—N/a	23.8	14.7
2019 legislative election	6 Oct 2019	—N/a	50.3	37.2 (20)	6.1 (3)	33.4 (18)	5.5 (3)	2.1 (1)	5.2 (2)	1.8 (0)	0.7 (0)	0.7 (0)	7.4 (0)	3.8
2019 regional election	22 Sep 2019	—N/a	55.5	39.4; 21	5.8; 3	35.8; 19	5.5; 3	1.8; 1	1.7; 0	1.5; 0	0.5; 0	0.4; 0	7.6; 0	3.6

Hypothetical polling

Paulo Cafôfo as PS leader

Polling firm/Link	Fieldwork date	Sample size	Turnout	PSD/CDS		Paulo Cafôfo	JPP	CDU	BE	PAN	IL	CH	O	Lead
Polling firm/Link	Fieldwork date	Sample size	Turnout	PSD	CDS–PP	Paulo Cafôfo	JPP	CDU	BE	PAN	IL	CH	O	Lead
Aximage	30 Jul–5 Aug 2022	414	65.9	48.1		18.6	11.4	1.2	2.8	1.6	3.6	3.5	9.2	29.5
Aximage	30 Jul–5 Aug 2022	414	65.9	48.3	2.4	20.6	10.7	1.7	1.9	1.1	2.2	3.5	7.6	27.7

== Voter turnout ==
The table below shows voter turnout throughout election day.

Turnout	Time								
Turnout	12:00			16:00			19:00		
Turnout	2019	2023	±	2019	2023	±	2019	2023	±
Total	20.97%	20.98%	▲0.01 pp	40.79%	39.90%	▼0.89 pp	55.51%	53.35%	▼2.16 pp

== Results ==
Summary of the 24 September 2023 Legislative Assembly of Madeira elections results
Parties	Votes	%	±pp swing	MPs				
Parties	Votes	%	±pp swing	2019	2023	±	%	±
We are Madeira (PSD/CDS–PP)	58,394	43.11	▼2.1	24	23	▼1	48.94	▼2.1
Socialist	28,840	21.29	▼14.5	19	11	▼8	23.40	▼17.0
Together for the People	14,933	11.03	▲5.6	3	5	▲2	10.63	▲4.2
Chega	12,029	8.88	▲8.5	0	4	▲4	8.51	▲8.5
Unitary Democratic Coalition	3,677	2.71	▲0.9	1	1	0	2.13	0.0
Liberal Initiative	3,555	2.62	▲2.1	0	1	▲1	2.13	▲2.1
People-Animals-Nature	3,046	2.25	▲0.8	0	1	▲1	2.13	▲2.1
Left Bloc	3,035	2.24	▲0.5	0	1	▲1	2.13	▲2.1
Labour	1,369	1.01	0.0	0	0	0	0.00	0.0
LIVRE	858	0.63	—N/a	—N/a	0	—N/a	0.00	—N/a
React, Include, Recycle	727	0.54	▼0.7	0	0	0	0.00	0.0
Earth	696	0.51	▲0.3	0	0	0	0.00	0.0
National Democratic Alternative (Note: In September 2021, the Democratic Republican Party (PDR) changed its name to the National Democratic Alternative (ADN).)	617	0.46	0.0	0	0	0	0.00	0.0
Total valid	131,776	97.29	▼0.4	47	47	0	100.00	0.0
Blank ballots	842	0.62	▲0.1					
Invalid ballots	2,828	2.09	▲0.3					
Total	135,446	100.00						
Registered voters/turnout	253,877	53.35	▼2.2					

Vote share
PSD/CDS–PP	43.11%
PS	21.29%
JPP	11.03%
CH	8.88%
CDU	2.71%
IL	2.62%
PAN	2.25%
BE	2.24%
PTP	1.01%
Others	2.14%
Blank/Invalid	2.71%

Parliamentary seats
PSD/CDS–PP	48.94%
PS	23.40%
JPP	10.63%
CH	8.51%
CDU	2.13%
IL	2.13%
PAN	2.13%
BE	2.13%

=== Maps ===
Most voted political force by municipality.

== Aftermath ==
=== Government approval ===
With the loss of their majority, PSD and CDS–PP reached a deal with People-Animals-Nature (PAN) in order to ensure a parliamentary majority. On 17 November 2023, the regional parliament approved Albuquerque's third government:

2023 Motion of confidence Miguel Albuquerque (PSD)
Ballot →	17 November 2023
Required majority →	Simple
Yes: • PSD (20); • CDS–PP (3); • PAN (1)	24 / 47
No: • PS (11); • JPP (5); • CH (4); • PCP (1); • IL (1); • BE (1)	23 / 47
Abstentions	0 / 47
Absentees	0 / 47
Result →	Approved

=== Fall of the government ===
On 24 January 2024, the Judiciary Police and the Public Prosecutor's office conducted a series of searches all across Madeira, from government offices to private companies, regarding corruption and abuse of power accusations surrounding real estate businesses in the region. The mayor of Funchal, Pedro Calado, and two businessmen were arrested by the police, while Miguel Albuquerque was named as a formal suspect. At first, Albuquerque refused to resign, but due to PAN's threat of withdrawing their support from the PSD/CDS-PP minority government, Miguel Abuquerque retracted his earlier position and resigned from office. But, despite this resignation, divisions inside the PSD resulted in no solution for Albuquerque's succession. Afterwards, the Representative of the Republic in Madeira, Ireneu Barreto, started hearing parties represented in the regional Parliament to decide the path to follow.

After hearing parties, Ireneu Barreto, on 17 February, announced that he would keep Albuquerque in office, in a caretaker capacity, until the President of Portugal decides whether there should be early elections or a new government under the current parliament. Because electoral rules determine that Parliaments can only be dissolved six months after the election of the previous one, the regional Parliament could only be dissolved from 24 March 2024 onwards. The President of Portugal decided, on 27 March 2024, to dissolve the regional parliament and call early elections for 26 May.
