= 2015 Madeiran regional election =

- 29 March 2015

47 seats to the Legislative Assembly of Madeira 24 seats needed for a majority
- Turnout: 49.6% ▼7.8 pp
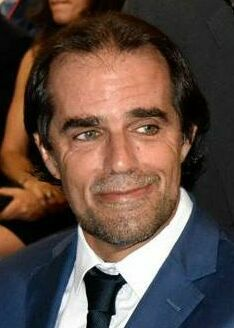

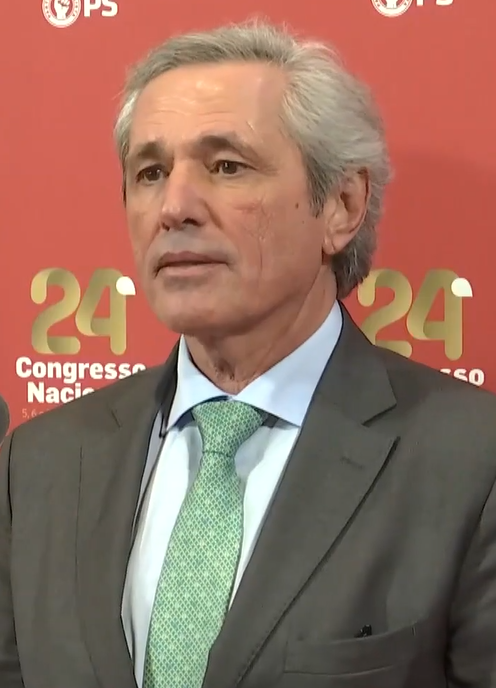

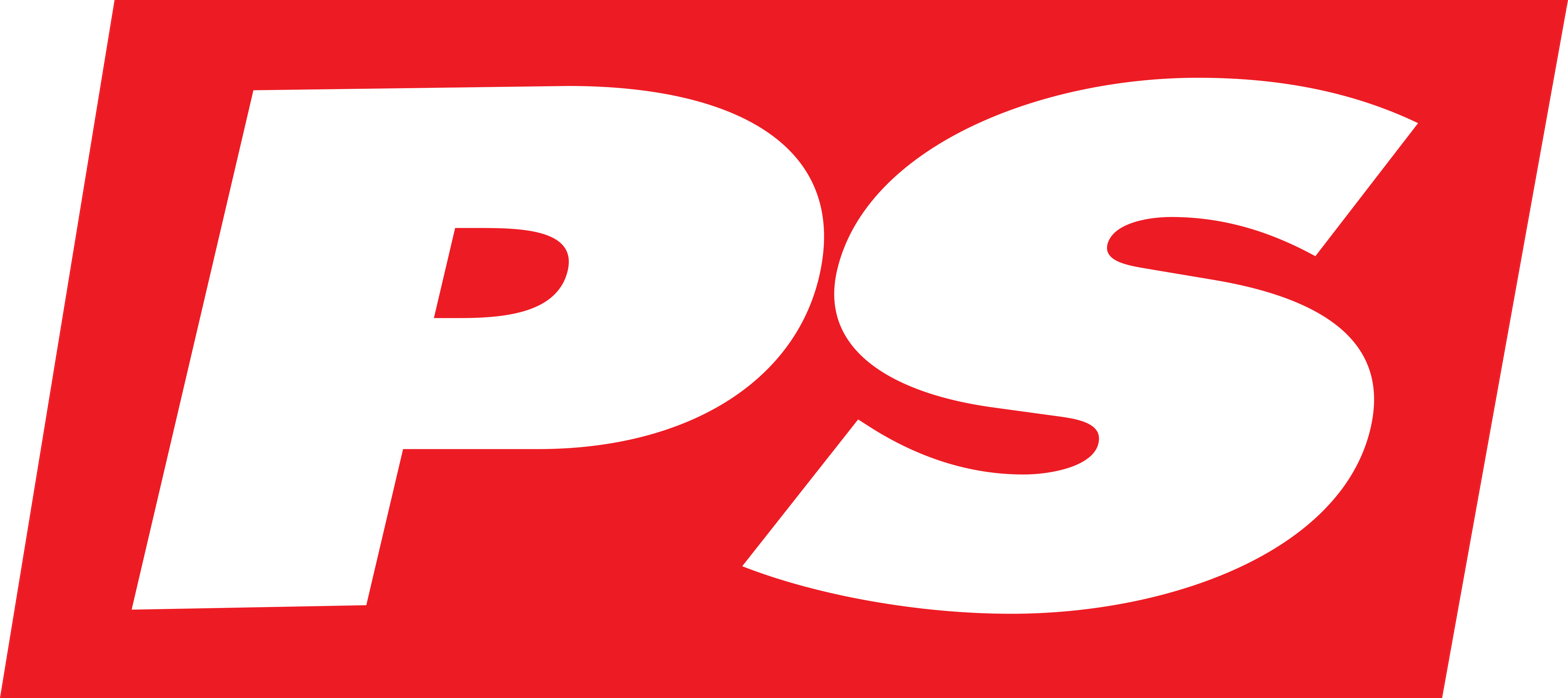

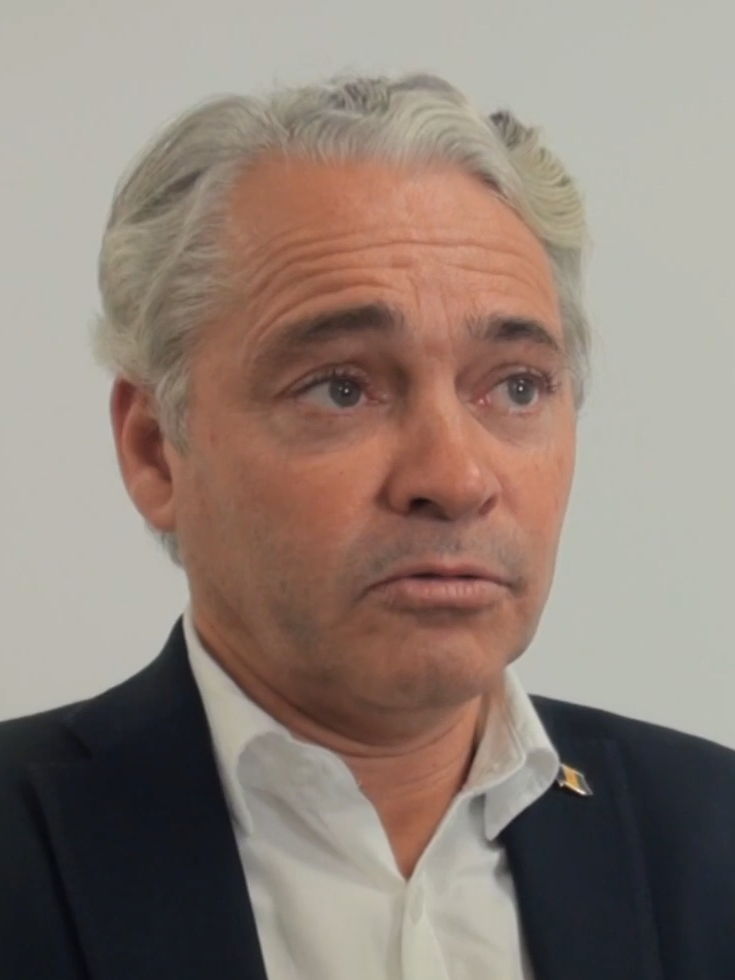

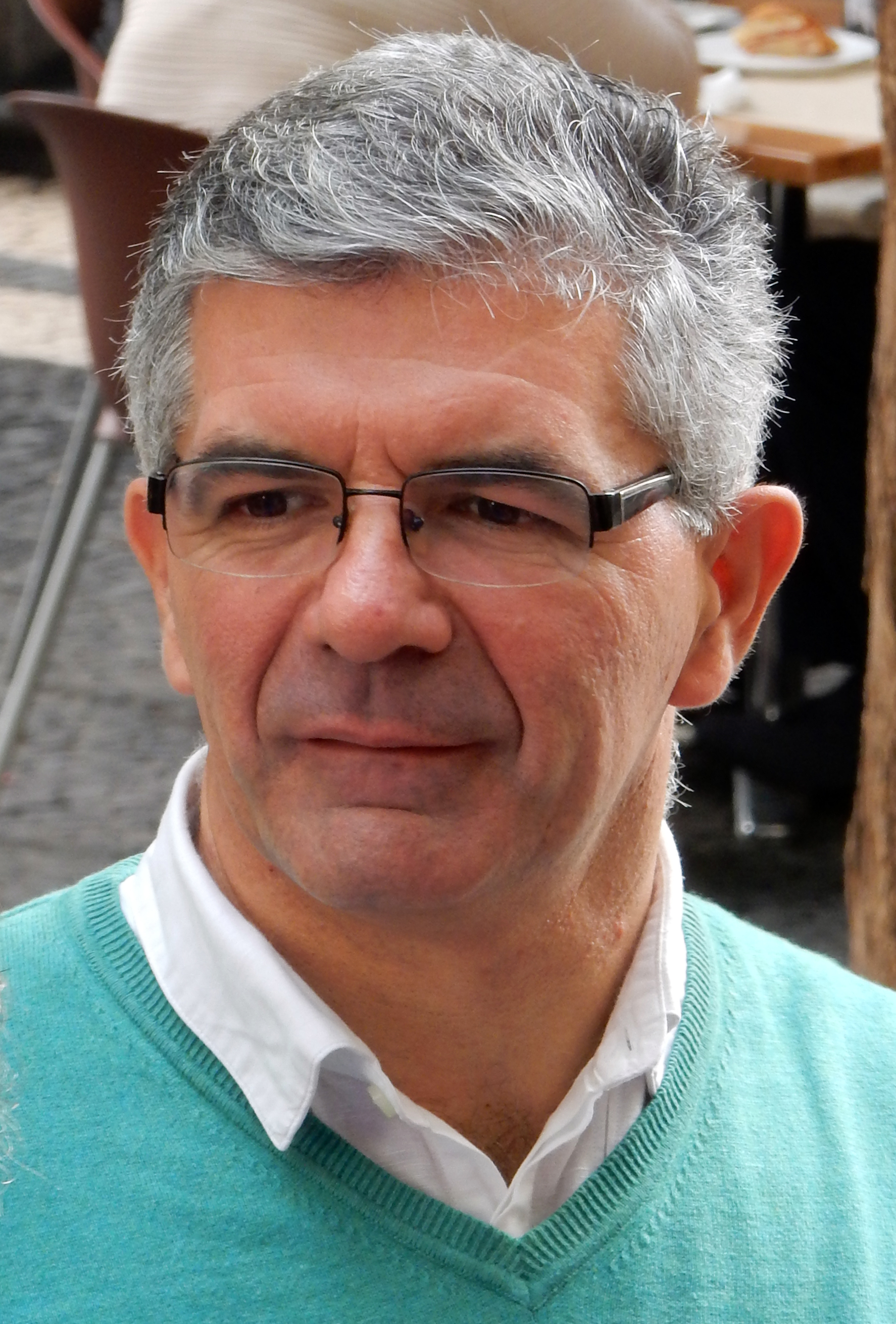

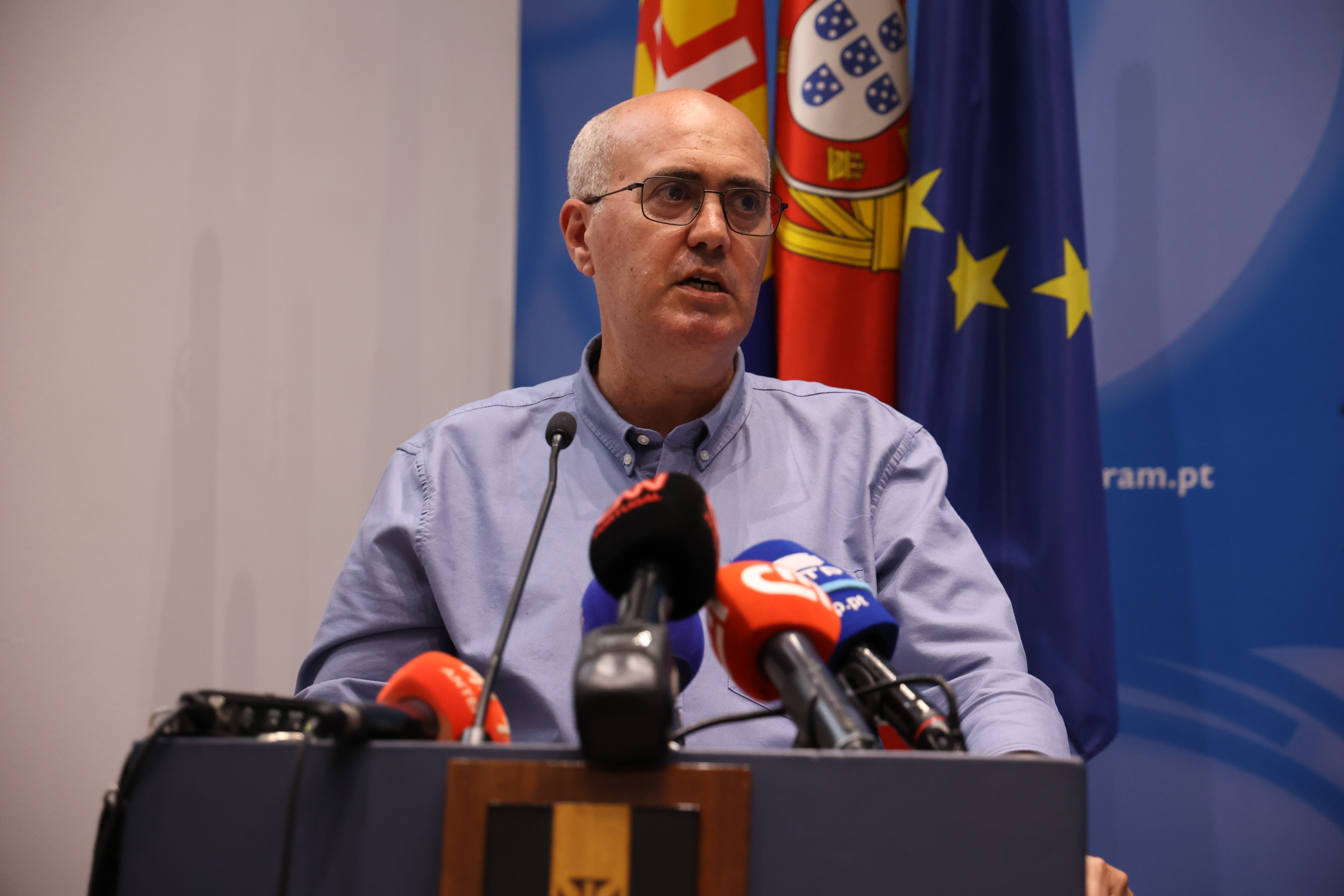
	First party	Second party	Third party
Leader	Miguel Albuquerque	José Manuel Rodrigues	Victor Freitas
Party	PSD	CDS–PP	PS
Alliance			Change
Last election	25 seats, 48.6%	9 seats, 17.6%	11 seats, 22.4% (Note: PS, PTP, PAN and MPT contested the election in an electoral coalition called Change.)
Seats won	24	7	6
Seat change	▼1	▼2	▼5
Popular vote	56,569	17,489	14,574
Percentage	44.4%	13.7%	11.4%
Swing	▼4.2 pp	▼3.9 pp	▼11.0 pp
	Fourth party	Fifth party	Sixth party
Leader	Élvio Sousa	Edgar Silva	Roberto Almada
Party	JPP	CDU	BE
Last election	Did not contest	1 seat, 3.8%	0 seats, 1.7%
Seats won	5	2	2
Seat change	▲5	▲1	▲2
Popular vote	13,114	7,060	4,849
Percentage	10.3%	5.5%	3.8%
Swing	New party	▲1.8 pp	▲2.1 pp
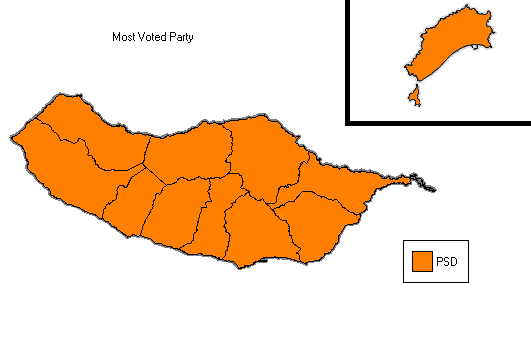
- The most voted party in each municipality.
President before election
Alberto João Jardim
PSD
Elected President
Miguel Albuquerque
PSD

A regional election was held in Madeira on 29 March 2015, to determine the composition of the Legislative Assembly of the Autonomous Region of Madeira. The election was the first in which the former President of the Region, Alberto João Jardim, was not on the ballot as he earlier stated that he would step down as President and leader of the PSD-Madeira in January 2015. On 29 December 2014, the PSD-Madeira elected Miguel Albuquerque as the new president of the party's regional section. After winning the presidency, Albuquerque stated that he would not assume the Presidency of the Government without an election, so Alberto João Jardim asked President Aníbal Cavaco Silva to dissolve the Parliament and call an election, which was scheduled for 29 March.

The campaign for the regional legislative election in Madeira ran from 15 to 27 March 2015.

The results showed that the Social Democrats were reelected for the 11th time in a row and, again, with an absolute majority of 24 seats, against the 25 seats won in 2011. The People's Party was again the second most voted party and the coalition between the Socialists and other smaller parties called Change suffered a huge defeat by winning fewer votes and seats compared to the combined total of the parties in 2011. Together for the People was the surprise of the election winning 10.3 percent of the vote and winning 5 seats. The Unitary Democratic Coalition increase their result by one MP and the Left Bloc returned to the regional parliament with 2 seats.

The turnout in these elections was the lowest ever, with 49.6 percent of voters casting a ballot.

== Background ==
=== Leadership changes and challenges ===
==== Social Democratic Party ====
After 34 years of uninterrupted rule and without any challenges to his leadership within the party, Alberto João Jardim faced an internal challenge from the mayor of Funchal, Miguel Albuquerque. The leadership ballot was held on 2 November 2012 and, in a surprise result, Jardim just narrowly defeated Albuquerque by a 52 to 48 percent margin. The results were the following:

Ballot: 2 November 2012
Candidate	Votes	%
Alberto João Jardim	1,786	52.1
Miguel Albuquerque	1,644	47.9
Blank/Invalid ballots	43	–
Turnout	3,473	90.00

Shortly after his narrow win in the party leadership ballot, Jardim announced that this would be his last term as leader and that he would abandon office in early 2015. In late 2014, a leadership ballot was called to elect Jardim's successor. Six candidates were in the race: Former mayor of Funchal, Miguel Albuquerque; João Cunha e Silva; Jaime Ramos; Miguel de Sousa, by then deputy Speaker of the Madeira regional parliament; Sérgio Marques, former member of Jardim's regional governments; and Manuel António Correia, by then regional secretary for Environment and Natural Resources. The first ballot was held on 19 December 2014 and a second one on 29 December 2014. Albuquerque was the most voted in the first round with 47 percent of the votes, and defeated Manuel António Correia by a 64 to 36 percent margin in the second round. The results were the following:

Ballot: 19 and 29 December 2014
Candidate	1st round		2nd round	
Candidate	Votes	%	Votes	%
Miguel Albuquerque	2,992	47.2	3,949	64.1
Manuel António Correia	1,819	28.7	2,216	35.9
João Cunha e Silva	996	15.7		
Sérgio Marques	335	5.3		
Miguel de Sousa	144	2.3		
Jaime Ramos	47	0.7		
Blank/Invalid ballots	64	–	67	–
Turnout	6,397	89.29	6,232	87.00

== Electoral system ==
The 47 members of the Madeiran regional parliament are elected in a single constituency by proportional representation under the D'Hondt method, coinciding with the territory of the Region.

== Parties ==
The parties that contested the election, and their leaders, were:

- Change (PS-PTP-PAN-MPT), Victor Freitas
- Citizen Platform (PPM-PDA), Miguel Fonseca
- Unitary Democratic Coalition (CDU), Edgar Silva
- New Democracy Party (PND), Baltazar Aguiar
- Workers' Communist Party (PCTP/MRPP), Alexandre Caldeira
- Left Bloc (BE), Roberto Almada
- National Renovator Party (PNR), Álvaro Araújo
- People's Party (CDS–PP), José Manuel Rodrigues
- Social Democratic Party (PSD), Miguel Albuquerque
- Socialist Alternative Movement (MAS), José Carlos Gonçalves Jardim
- Together for the People (JPP), Filipe Sousa

== Opinion polling ==
Poll results are listed in the table below in reverse chronological order, showing the most recent first. The highest percentage figure in each polling survey is displayed in bold, and the background shaded in the leading party's colour. In the instance that there is a tie, then no figure is shaded but both are displayed in bold. The lead column on the right shows the percentage-point difference between the two parties with the highest figures. Poll results use the date the survey's fieldwork was done, as opposed to the date of publication. The highest seat figures in each polling survey have their background shaded in the leading party's colour. In the instance that there is a tie, then no figure is shaded. 24 seats are required for an absolute majority in the Legislative Assembly of Madeira.

Polling firm/Link	Fieldwork date	PSD	CDS–PP	Change				CDU	PND	BE		O	Lead
Polling firm/Link	Fieldwork date	PSD	CDS–PP	PS	PTP	PAN	MPT	CDU	PND	BE		O	Lead
**2015 regional election**	29 Mar 2015	**44.4**; 24	13.7; 7	11.4; 6				5.5; 2	2.1; 1	3.8; 2	10.3; 5	8.8; 0	**30.6**
UCP–CESOP	21–23 Mar 2015	**49**; 23/27	11; 4/6	18; 8/10				5; 2/3	2; 0/1	3; 1/2	6; 2/3	6; 0/1	31
Eurosondagem	16–18 Mar 2015	**46.7**; 24/25	12.5; 6/7	19.5; 10/11				4.8; 2	1.6; 0/1	2.5; 1	5.5; 2/3	6.9; 0	27.2
Eurosondagem	9–12 Mar 2015	**43.3**; 22/23	11.1; 5/6	22.5; 11/12				4.8; 2	1.7; 0/1	2.2; 1	7.7; 4	6.7; 0	20.8
Eurosondagem	11–14 Nov 2014	**33.1**	16.9	26.6	4.6	2.6	2.3	5.5	1.8	2.5	—N/a	4.1	6.5
Eurosondagem	3–5 Nov 2014	**30.9**	17.0	27.0	5.5	2.1	1.7	5.2	2.3	2.5	—N/a	5.8	3.9
Eurosondagem	18–22 Jul 2014	**32.1**	17.9	22.6	3.6	2.6	5.7	5.2	2.2	2.1	—N/a	6.0	9.5
**2014 EP elections**	24 May 2014	**31.0** (18)		22.6 (13)	6.6 (3)	3.3 (1)	10.0 (5)	4.8 (2)	2.3 (1)	3.7 (2)	—N/a	15.7 (2)	**8.4**
Eurosondagem	8–14 Jan 2014	**33.9**	20.1	25.5	4.0	1.3	1.2	5.3	2.1	2.2	—N/a	4.4	8.4
**2013 local elections**	29 Sep 2013	**34.8** (21)	13.0 (8)	25.8 (15)	0.7 (0)	1.2 (0)	1.6 (0)	5.3 (3)	—N/a	0.4 (0)	—N/a	17.2 (0)	**9.0**
Eurosondagem	24–25 May 2013	**43.9**	21.2	13.5	4.4	2.4	2.3	3.9	3.7	2.6	—N/a	2.1	22.7
**2011 regional election**	9 Oct 2011	**48.6**; 25	17.6; 9	11.5; 6	6.9; 3	2.1; 1	1.9; 1	3.8; 1	3.3; 1	1.7; 0	—N/a	2.6; 0	**31.0**

== Voter turnout ==
The table below shows voter turnout throughout election day.

Turnout	Time								
Turnout	12:00			16:00			19:00		
Turnout	2011	2015	±	2011	2015	±	2011	2015	±
Total	23.47%	17.21%	▼6.26 pp	43.46%	37.48%	▼5.98 pp	57.38%	49.58%	▼7.80 pp

== Summary of votes and seats ==
Summary of the 29 March 2015 Legislative Assembly of Madeira elections results
Parties	Votes	%	±pp swing	MPs				
Parties	Votes	%	±pp swing	2011	2015	±	%	±
Social Democratic	56,574	44.36	▼4.2	25	24	▼1	51.06	▼2.1
People's	17,488	13.71	▼3.9	9	7	▼2	14.89	▼4.3
Change Coalition (PS/PTP/PAN/MPT) (Note: Coalition between the PS, PTP, PAN and the MPT. The 11 seats from 2011 are the sum of PS, PTP, PAN and MPT seats.)	14,573	11.43	▼11.0	11	6	▼5	12.77	▼10.6
Together for the People	13,114	10.28	—N/a	—N/a	5	—N/a	10.64	—N/a
Unitary Democratic Coalition (Note: Portuguese Communist Party (2 MPs) and "The Greens" (0 MPs) ran in coalition.)	7,060	5.54	▲1.8	1	2	▲1	4.25	▲2.1
Left Bloc	4,849	3.80	▲2.1	0	2	▲2	4.25	▲4.3
New Democracy	2,635	2.07	▼1.2	1	1	0	2.13	0.0
Portuguese Workers' Communist	2,137	1.67	—N/a	—N/a	0	—N/a	0.00	—N/a
Socialist Alternative Movement	1,715	1.34	—N/a	—N/a	0	—N/a	0.00	—N/a
National Renovator	1,052	0.82	—N/a	—N/a	0	—N/a	0.00	—N/a
Citizen Platform (PPM/PDA) (Note: People's Monarchist Party (0 MPs) and Democratic Party of the Atlantic (0 MPs) ran in coalition.)	903	0.71	—N/a	—N/a	0	—N/a	0.00	—N/a
Total valid	122,100	95.74	▼1.6	47	47	0	100.00	0.0
Blank ballots	1,116	0.87	▲0.2					
Invalid ballots	4,323	3.39	▲1.5					
Total	127,539	100.00						
Registered voters/turnout	257,232	49.58	▼7.8					
Source: Comissão Nacional de Eleições

Vote share
PSD	44.36%
CDS–PP	13.71%
CM	11.43%
JPP	10.28%
CDU	5.54%
BE	3.80%
PND	2.07%
PCTP/MRPP	1.67%
MAS	1.34%
Others	1.53%
Blank/Invalid	4.26%

Parliamentary seats
PSD	51.06%
CDS–PP	14.89%
CM	12.67%
JPP	10.64%
CDU	4.25%
BE	4.25%
PND	2.13%

=== Maps ===
Most voted political force by municipality.

== See also ==
- Madeira
