= Quinta do Arco =

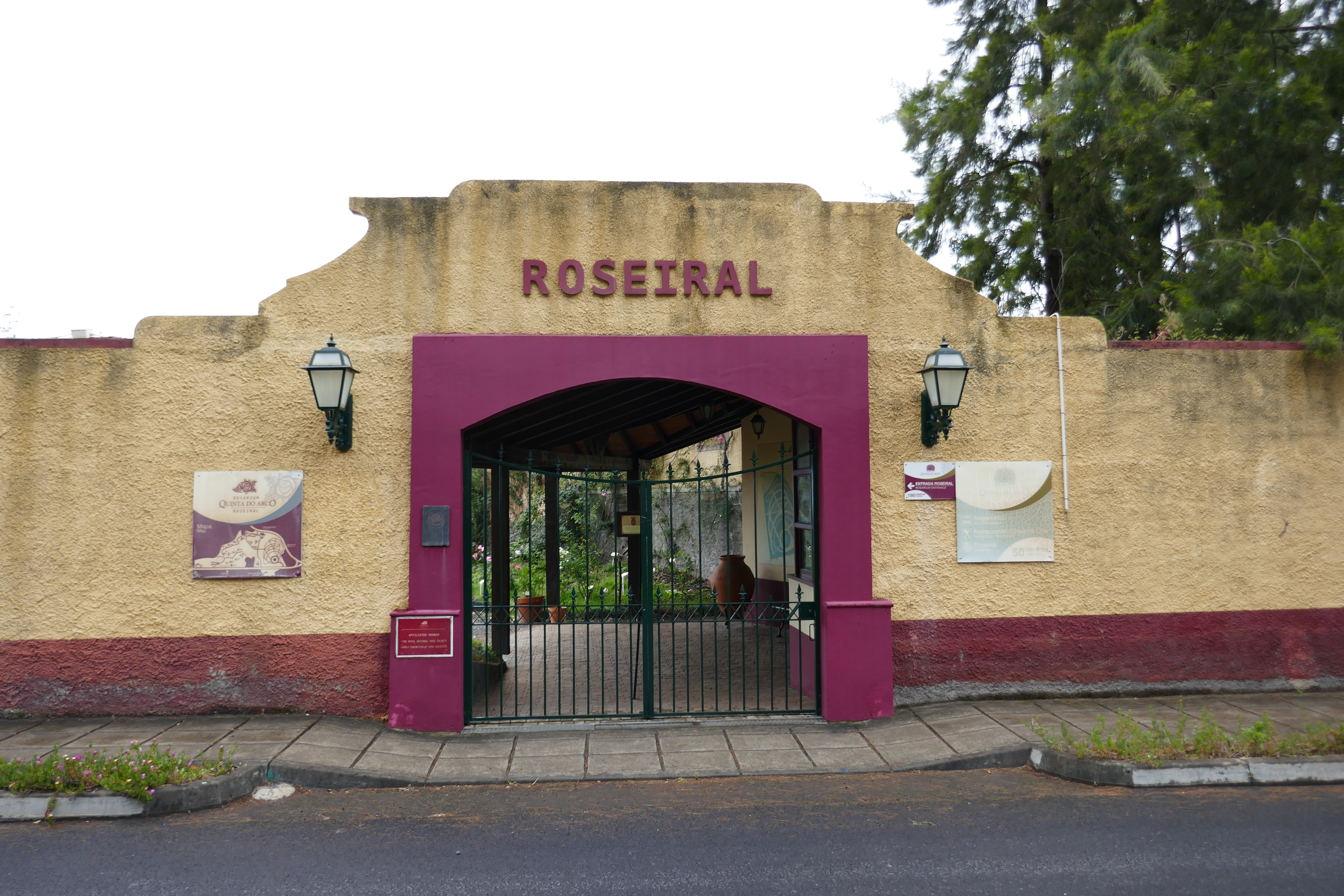
Entrance

Roseiral Quinta do Arco is a rose garden located in the former estate of Quinta do Arco in the place Arco de São Jorge on the island Madeira. The garden is available to the public from April to December.

The roses in the garden are collected by the lawyer, politician, and rose hobbyist Miguel Albuquerque, who was the mayor of Funchal from 1994 to 2013, and who is the president of the Portuguese autonomous region of Madeira since 2015. Throughout the year, the garden was private property (the new owner of the garden is since 2017 the Portuguese hotel company Pestana). The garden consists of 1550 different types of roses and rose cultivars with a total of about 17,000 specimens of roses both old and new. In 2006, Miguel Albuquerque published a book where he writes about a few of the most important roses from the garden. The rosarium contains a few rare rose species, for example, the indigenous rose Rosa mandonii. Albuquerque is also busy with rose breeding; the rose 'Lagoa' is, for example, a rose created by him in 2015.
