= Élvio Sousa =

Portuguese politician (born 1974)

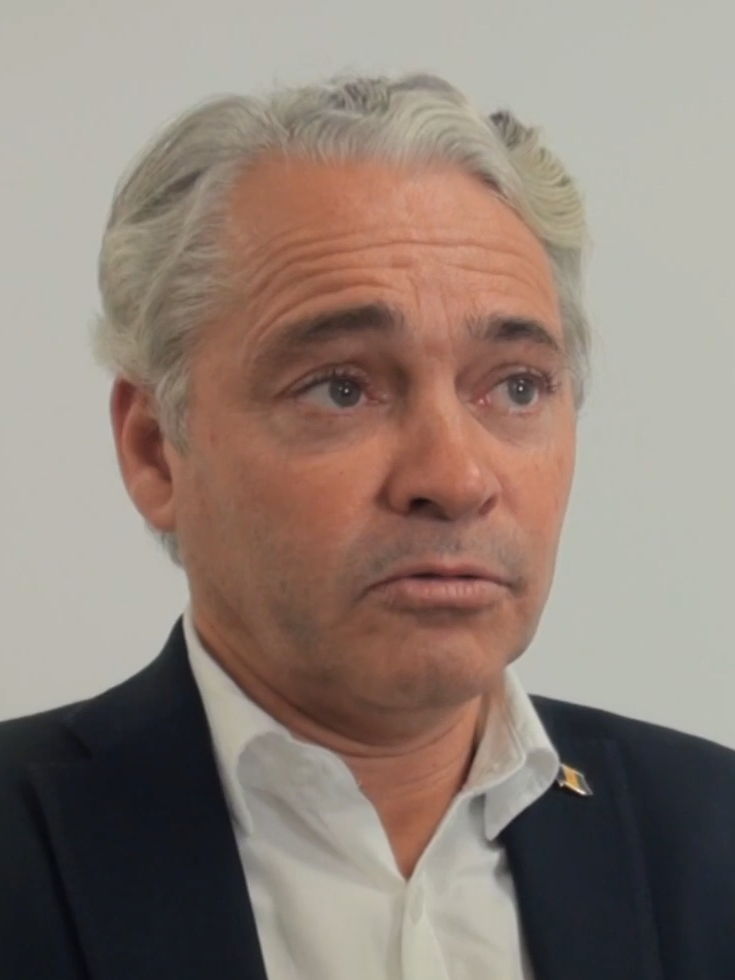
- Sousa in 2025

Secretary-General of Together for the People
- Incumbent
- Assumed office 27 January 2015
- President: Filipe Sousa (2015–2024); Lina Pereira (since 2024)
- Preceded by: Party established

Member of the Legislative Assembly of Madeira
- Incumbent
- Assumed office 29 March 2015

President of the Gaula Parish
- In office 11 October 2009 – 16 October 2021
- Preceded by: Gustavo Caires
- Succeeded by: Liliana Valente

Personal details
- Born: Élvio Duarte Martins Sousa; 19 April 1974 (age 52) Gaula, Santa Cruz, Madeira, Portugal
- Party: JPP (since 2008)
- Children: 2
- Relatives: Filipe Sousa (brother)
- Education: University of Lisbon
- Occupation: Archeologist • Politician

Élvio Duarte Martins Sousa (born 19 April 1974) is a Portuguese archeologist and politician from Madeira, currently serving as the secretary-general of Together for the People and as a member of the Legislative Assembly of Madeira since 2015.

== Biography ==
Élvio Sousa has a PhD in Regional and Local History from the University of Lisbon, being a researcher from CHAM – Centro de História de Aquém e de Além-Mar of the NOVA University of Lisbon.

In 2009, he founded the independent movement "For the People of Gaula" with his brother Filipe Sousa in order to be able to run for President of the Parish of Gaula, winning with 46.6% of the votes. The movement changed its name to Together for the People, winning the Mayorship of Santa Cruz in 2013 for Filipe Sousa.

In 2015, Together for the People became a political party, with Élvio Sousa as secretary-general and Filipe Sousa as president of the party. The party ran in that year's regional elections, with Élvio Sousa as the main candidate, winning over 10% of the votes and achieving 5 elected members of the Legislative Assembly of Madeira.

Élvio Sousa was reelected to the regional assembly in 2019, 2023, 2024 and 2025, becoming the opposition leader of Madeira in the last elections, after surpassing the Socialist Party led by Paulo Cafôfo.

== Electoral history ==
=== Madeiran regional election, 2015 ===
Ballot: 29 March 2015
Party	Candidate	Votes	%	Seats	+/−
PSD	Miguel Albuquerque	56,574	44.4	24	–1
CDS–PP	José Manuel Rodrigues	17,488	13.4	7	–2
PS/PTP/PAN/MPT	Victor Freitas	14,573	11.4	6	–5
JPP	Élvio Sousa	13,114	10.3	5	new
CDU	Edgar Silva	7,060	5.5	2	+1
BE	Roberto Almada	4,849	3.8	2	+2
PND	Baltazar Aguiar	2,635	2.1	1	±0
PCTP/MRPP	Alexandre Caldeira	2,137	1.7	0	new
MAS	José Carlos Jardim	1,715	1.3	0	new
Other parties		1,955	1.5	0	±0
Blank/Invalid ballots		5,439	4.3	–	–
Turnout		127,539	49.58	47	±0
Source: Comissão Nacional de Eleições

=== Madeiran regional election, 2019 ===
Ballot: 22 September 2019
Party	Candidate	Votes	%	Seats	+/−
PSD	Miguel Albuquerque	56,449	39.4	21	–3
PS	Paulo Cafôfo	51,207	37.8	19	+14
CDS–PP	Rui Barreto	8,246	5.8	3	–4
JPP	Élvio Sousa	7,830	5.5	3	–2
CDU	Edgar Silva	7,060	1.8	1	–1
BE	Paulino Ascensão	2,489	1.7	0	–2
PAN	João Henrique de Freitas	2,095	1.5	0	±0
PURP	Rafael Macedo	1,766	1.2	0	new
RIR	Roberto Vieira	1,749	1.2	0	new
PTP	Raquel Coelho	1,426	1.0	0	–1
Other parties		4,132	2.9	0	–1
Blank/Invalid ballots		5,439	4.3	–	–
Turnout		143,200	55.50	47	±0
Source: Comissão Nacional de Eleições

=== Madeiran regional election, 2023 ===
Ballot: 24 September 2023
Party	Candidate	Votes	%	Seats	+/−
PSD/CDS–PP	Miguel Albuquerque	58,394	43.1	23	–1
PS	Sérgio Gonçalves	28,840	21.3	11	–8
JPP	Élvio Sousa	14,933	11.0	5	+2
CHEGA	Miguel Castro	12,029	8.8	4	+4
CDU	Edgar Silva	3,677	2.7	1	±0
IL	Nuno Morna	3,555	2.6	1	+1
PAN	Mónica Freitas	3,046	2.3	1	+1
BE	Roberto Almada	3,035	2.2	1	+1
PTP	Quintino Costa	1,369	1.0	0	±0
Other parties		2,898	2.1	0	±0
Blank/Invalid ballots		3,670	2.7	–	–
Turnout		135,446	53.35	47	±0
Source: Comissão Nacional de Eleições

=== Madeiran regional election, 2024 ===
Ballot: 26 May 2024
Party	Candidate	Votes	%	Seats	+/−
PSD	Miguel Albuquerque	49,104	36.1	19	–1
PS	Paulo Cafôfo	28,840	21.3	11	±0
JPP	Élvio Sousa	22,959	16.9	9	+4
CHEGA	Miguel Castro	12,562	9.2	4	±0
CDS–PP	José Manuel Rodrigues	5,374	4.0	2	–1
IL	Nuno Morna	3,481	2.6	1	±0
PAN	Mónica Freitas	2,531	1.9	1	±0
CDU	Edgar Silva	2,217	1.6	0	–1
BE	Roberto Almada	1,912	1.4	0	–1
Other parties		4,003	3.0	0	±0
Blank/Invalid ballots		2,793	2.1	–	–
Turnout		135,917	53.40	47	±0
Source: Comissão Nacional de Eleições

=== Madeiran regional election, 2025 ===
Ballot: 23 March 2025
Party	Candidate	Votes	%	Seats	+/−
PSD	Miguel Albuquerque	62,059	43.4	23	+4
JPP	Élvio Sousa	30,091	21.1	11	+2
PS	Paulo Cafôfo	22,351	15.6	8	–3
CHEGA	Miguel Castro	7,821	5.5	3	–1
CDS–PP	José Manuel Rodrigues	4,289	3.0	1	–1
IL	Gonçalo Maia Camelo	3,019	2.2	1	±0
CDU	Edgar Silva	2,543	1.8	0	±0
PAN	Mónica Freitas	2,323	1.6	0	–1
BE	Roberto Almada	1,586	1.1	0	±0
Other parties		3,503	2.4	0	±0
Blank/Invalid ballots		2,296	2.3	–	–
Turnout		142,959	55.98	47	±0
Source: Comissão Nacional de Eleições
