= Virgílio Pereira =

Portuguese politician (1941–2021)

Virgílio Higino Gonçalves Pereira (11 January 1941 – 24 July 2021) was a Portuguese politician.

Pereira was born in Funchal, Portugal, on 11 January 1941, and, as a member of the Social Democratic Party, served his hometown as president of the municipal council from 1974 to 1983. He was then elected to the Assembly of the Republic, on which he served until 1986. Pereira represented Portugal as a Member of the European Parliament from 1986 to 1994. His second stint as president of the Funchal municipal council ran from January to September 1994.
