= Miguel Albuquerque =

Portuguese politician

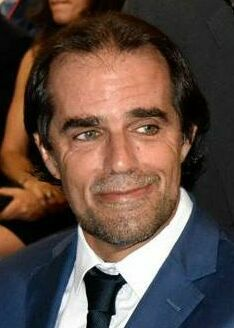
- Miguel Albuquerque in 2017

President of the Regional Government of Madeira
- Incumbent
- Assumed office 20 April 2015
- Vice President: Pedro Calado (2017–2021)
- Preceded by: Alberto João Jardim

President of the Social Democratic Party of Madeira
- Incumbent
- Assumed office 10 January 2015
- Preceded by: Alberto João Jardim

Mayor of Funchal
- In office 1 September 1994 – 21 October 2013
- Deputy: Bruno Pereira
- Preceded by: Virgílio Pereira
- Succeeded by: Paulo Cafôfo

Deputy Mayor of Funchal
- In office 12 December 1993 – 1 September 1994
- President: Virgílio Pereira

Member of the Legislative Assembly of Madeira
- In office 9 October 1988 – 12 December 1993

Personal details
- Born: Miguel Filipe Machado de Albuquerque; 4 May 1961 (age 65) Funchal, Madeira, Portugal
- Party: Social Democratic Party (1988–present)
- Other political affiliations: Social Democratic Youth
- Spouse: Unknown (divorced) Elisabete Andrade (m. 1994; div. 2008) Sofia Fernandes ()
- Children: 6
- Education: Universidade Livre de Lisboa
- Occupation: Politician • Lawyer

Miguel Filipe Machado de Albuquerque (born 4 May 1961) is a Portuguese politician and the current President of the Regional Government of Madeira. He took office as leader of the Social Democratic Party (PSD) of Madeira on 10 January 2015. He was a former mayor of Funchal, Madeira. Albuquerque likes gardening and used to grow many types of roses in Quinta do Arco.

He was indicted in January 2024 for alleged active and passive corruption, embezzlement, abuse of power and influence peddling. The mayor of Funchal, Pedro Calado, and two businessmen were also arrested in the same case and later released with accusations pending further investigations.

== Political career ==
=== Mayor of Funchal ===
As a mayor he signed an agreement to the twinning of the city of Funchal and Gibraltar on 13 May 2009 by the then mayor of Gibraltar Solomon Levy, who had been an Evacuee during the Evacuation of the Gibraltarian civilian population during World War II from Gibraltar to Madeira. Levy then had a meeting with the then President of Madeira Alberto João Jardim.

In April 2012 Miguel opened a road in St Helier, Jersey, which was named Rue de Funchal, after his native city.

== President of the Regional Government ==
=== 2015 Regional elections ===
In the 29 March 2015 regional elections Albuquerque's centre right party PSD have held on to power after an overall majority with 44.4% of the votes and winning 24 seats in the regional parliament. It was the 11th time in a row the PSD has won an absolute majority in Madeira.

This election was the first in which PSD's former leader and president of the region, Alberto João Jardim's name did not appear on the ballot, as he stated in 2011, meaning he would step down as the president and leader of PSD-Madeira in 2015. Albuquerque was then elected on 29 December 2014 as president and leader of PSD-Madeira, but he stated that he would not automatically assume the position as president of the Autonomous Region of Madeira without any elections, though parliament was dissolved. In accordance with the law, once parliament is dissolved, the President is obliged go to Lisbon to join a meeting of the Portuguese Council of State and to explain why parliament was dissolved. The president at the time Alberto Joao Jardim was called to attend, which he did and he asked Cavaco Silva, President of Portugal, to call an election in Madeira, which he did so for the 29th of March 2015.

=== Corruption scandal ===
Miguel Albuquerque is a suspect in criminal proceedings for corruption, economic participation in business and malfeasance, in addition to possible violation of community rules on adjudication. The investigation was opened in 2019, in Funchal. At issue is the possible relationship between Miguel Albuquerque's private real estate business and the direct adjustment of the Madeira Free Trade Zone concession to the Pestana Group. On March 17, 2021, following an anonymous complaint, several services of the Government of Madeira were searched, with “facts likely to be part of the practice of crimes of malfeasance, corruption and economic participation in business” at stake. Elements of the Portuguese Judiciary Police and the Central Department of Investigation and Criminal Action (DCIAP) also carried out, on May 13, 2021, searches at the facilities of the Government of Madeira, as part of the tender relating to the maritime connection between Funchal and Portimão, confirmed the executive regional.

On January 24, 2024, the Portuguese Judiciary Police carried out around 130 searches, in Madeira and on the Portuguese mainland, as part of three legal proceedings. Miguel Albuquerque was named a defendant on the same day by the Public Prosecutor's Office, accused of 8 crimes: active corruption, passive corruption, malfeasance, undue receipt of an advantage, influence peddling, abuse of power, economic participation in business and an attack on the rule of law. As part of the same processes, the Mayor of Funchal, Pedro Calado, and two businessmen, Avelino Farinha from Grupo AFA and Custódio Correia from Grupo Socicorreia, were arrested on the same day.

==== Aftermath ====
Consequently, he resigned from the position of president of the Regional Government of Madeira, remaining in the position until his successor took office before the Representative of the Republic. He ran again for the position of president of PSD Madeira, having been re-elected on March 21, 2024 against candidate Manuel António Correia, and contested the 2024 regional elections as head of the PSD list. The PSD came first again, losing two deputies and remaining without an absolute majority, but Miguel Albuquerque was again appointed president of the XV Regional Government of Madeira, which was approved by the Legislative Assembly of Madeira in June 2024.

=== 2024 Political crisis ===
Despite winning the 2024 regional legislative elections, Albuquerque failed to get the Madeira Regional Government Budget for the FY2025 approved due a to a motion of no confidence tabled by Chega in the Legislative Assembly of Madeira and approved by the Opposition. The grounds for the motion were the fact that in light of the corruption scandal and parallel investigations unrelated to it 5 members of the Regional Government were deemed arguidos in judicial investigations pertaining corruption.

The above led to Manuel António Correia to try, once again, to trigger for internal elections within PSD and requesting the President of the Republic to delay regional legislative elections until the party has a new regional leader.

=== 2025 Elections ===
President Marcelo Rebelo de Sousa called for early regional elections in 2025, the third consecutive year of elections in Madeira, which in turn have led to a PSD-CDS majority in the Madeiran parliament and Albuquerque being appointed as President of the Regional Government.

== Writings ==
=== Books ===
- Funchal, sobre a Cidade - Colectânea de artigos publicados, Quetzal Editores, 1996;
- Espelho Múltiplo - Política e Modernidade, Edicarte Editora, 1999;
- Roseiras Antigas de Jardim, Alêtheia Editora, 2006;
- Crónicas dum Lugar-Comum, Alêtheia Editora, 2010.

== Electoral history ==
=== Funchal City council election, 1997 ===
Ballot: 14 December 1997
Party	Candidate	Votes	%	Seats	+/−
PSD	Miguel Albuquerque	29,206	50.9	6	+1
PS	José Mota Torres	15,677	27.3	3	±0
CDU	–	3,863	6.7	0	±0
CDS–PP	–	3,301	5.7	0	–1
UDP	–	3,161	5.5	0	±0
Other parties		464	0.8	0	±0
Blank/Invalid ballots		1,690	3.0	–	–
Turnout		57,352	58.74	9	±0
Source: Comissão Nacional de Eleições

=== Funchal City council election, 2001 ===
Ballot: 16 December 2001
Party	Candidate	Votes	%	Seats	+/−
PSD	Miguel Albuquerque	29,378	55.7	6	±0
PS/CDS–PP	José António Cardoso	14,392	27.3	3	±0
UDP	–	3,768	7.2	0	±0
CDU	–	3,383	6.4	0	±0
Blank/Invalid ballots		1,804	3.4	–	–
Turnout		52,725	54.34	9	±0
Source: Comissão Nacional de Eleições

=== Funchal City council election, 2005 ===
Ballot: 9 October 2005
Party	Candidate	Votes	%	Seats	+/−
PSD	Miguel Albuquerque	29,210	50.2	6	±0
PS	Carlos Alberto Pereira	14,627	25.2	3	±0
CDU	Artur Andrade	4,844	8.3	1	+1
CDS–PP	Rui Gomes Vieira	4,534	7.8	1	+1
BE	–	2,919	5.0	0	new
Blank/Invalid ballots		2,017	3.5	–	–
Turnout		58,151	57.79	11	+2
Source: Comissão Nacional de Eleições

=== Funchal City council election, 2009 ===
Ballot: 11 October 2009
Party	Candidate	Votes	%	Seats	+/−
PSD	Miguel Albuquerque	29,227	52.2	7	+1
PS	Rui Caetano	7,584	13.5	1	–2
CDS–PP	Lino Abreu	5,617	10.0	1	±0
PND	Gil Canha	4,737	8.5	1	new
CDU	Artur Andrade	3,846	6.9	1	±0
BE	Rodrigo Trancoso	2,433	4.4	0	±0
MPT	Roberto Vieira	1,166	2.1	0	new
Blank/Invalid ballots		1,382	2.5	–	–
Turnout		55,992	52.75	11	±0
Source: Comissão Nacional de Eleições

=== Madeiran regional election, 2015 ===
Ballot: 29 March 2015
Party	Candidate	Votes	%	Seats	+/−
PSD	Miguel Albuquerque	56,574	44.4	24	–1
CDS–PP	José Manuel Rodrigues	17,488	13.4	7	–2
PS/PTP/PAN/MPT	Victor Freitas	14,573	11.4	6	–5
JPP	Élvio Sousa	13,114	10.3	5	new
CDU	Edgar Silva	7,060	5.5	2	+1
BE	Roberto Almada	4,849	3.8	2	+2
PND	Baltazar Aguiar	2,635	2.1	1	±0
PCTP/MRPP	Alexandre Caldeira	2,137	1.7	0	new
MAS	José Carlos Jardim	1,715	1.3	0	new
Other parties		1,955	1.5	0	±0
Blank/Invalid ballots		5,439	4.3	–	–
Turnout		127,539	49.58	47	±0
Source: Comissão Nacional de Eleições

=== Madeiran regional election, 2019 ===
Ballot: 22 September 2019
Party	Candidate	Votes	%	Seats	+/−
PSD	Miguel Albuquerque	56,449	39.4	21	–3
PS	Paulo Cafôfo	51,207	37.8	19	+14
CDS–PP	Rui Barreto	8,246	5.8	3	–4
JPP	Élvio Sousa	7,830	5.5	3	–2
CDU	Edgar Silva	7,060	1.8	1	–1
BE	Paulino Ascensão	2,489	1.7	0	–2
PAN	João Henrique de Freitas	2,095	1.5	0	±0
PURP	Rafael Macedo	1,766	1.2	0	new
RIR	Roberto Vieira	1,749	1.2	0	new
PTP	Raquel Coelho	1,426	1.0	0	–1
Other parties		4,132	2.9	0	–1
Blank/Invalid ballots		5,439	4.3	–	–
Turnout		143,200	55.50	47	±0
Source: Comissão Nacional de Eleições

=== Madeiran regional election, 2023 ===
Ballot: 24 September 2023
Party	Candidate	Votes	%	Seats	+/−
PSD/CDS–PP	Miguel Albuquerque	58,394	43.1	23	–1
PS	Sérgio Gonçalves	28,840	21.3	11	–8
JPP	Élvio Sousa	14,933	11.0	5	+2
CHEGA	Miguel Castro	12,029	8.8	4	+4
CDU	Edgar Silva	3,677	2.7	1	±0
IL	Nuno Morna	3,555	2.6	1	+1
PAN	Mónica Freitas	3,046	2.3	1	+1
BE	Roberto Almada	3,035	2.2	1	+1
PTP	Quintino Costa	1,369	1.0	0	±0
Other parties		2,898	2.1	0	±0
Blank/Invalid ballots		3,670	2.7	–	–
Turnout		135,446	53.35	47	±0
Source: Comissão Nacional de Eleições

=== Madeiran regional election, 2024 ===
Ballot: 26 May 2024
Party	Candidate	Votes	%	Seats	+/−
PSD	Miguel Albuquerque	49,104	36.1	19	–1
PS	Paulo Cafôfo	28,840	21.3	11	±0
JPP	Élvio Sousa	22,959	16.9	9	+4
CHEGA	Miguel Castro	12,562	9.2	4	±0
CDS–PP	José Manuel Rodrigues	5,374	4.0	2	–1
IL	Nuno Morna	3,481	2.6	1	±0
PAN	Mónica Freitas	2,531	1.9	1	±0
CDU	Edgar Silva	2,217	1.6	0	–1
BE	Roberto Almada	1,912	1.4	0	–1
Other parties		4,003	3.0	0	±0
Blank/Invalid ballots		2,793	2.1	–	–
Turnout		135,917	53.40	47	±0
Source: Comissão Nacional de Eleições

=== Madeiran regional election, 2025 ===
Ballot: 23 March 2025
Party	Candidate	Votes	%	Seats	+/−
PSD	Miguel Albuquerque	62,059	43.4	23	+4
JPP	Élvio Sousa	30,091	21.1	11	+2
PS	Paulo Cafôfo	22,351	15.6	8	–3
CHEGA	Miguel Castro	7,821	5.5	3	–1
CDS–PP	José Manuel Rodrigues	4,289	3.0	1	–1
IL	Gonçalo Maia Camelo	3,019	2.2	1	±0
CDU	Edgar Silva	2,543	1.8	0	±0
PAN	Mónica Freitas	2,323	1.6	0	–1
BE	Roberto Almada	1,586	1.1	0	±0
Other parties		3,503	2.4	0	±0
Blank/Invalid ballots		2,296	2.3	–	–
Turnout		142,959	55.98	47	±0
Source: Comissão Nacional de Eleições

Party political offices
Preceded by Alberto João Jardim	President of the Madeira section of the Social Democratic Party; 2015–present	Incumbent
Political offices
Preceded by Virgílio Pereira	Mayor of Funchal; 1994–2013	Succeeded by Paulo Cafôfo
Preceded by Alberto João Jardim	President of the Regional Government of Madeira; 2015–present	Incumbent
