= Paulo Cafôfo =

Portuguese teacher and politician

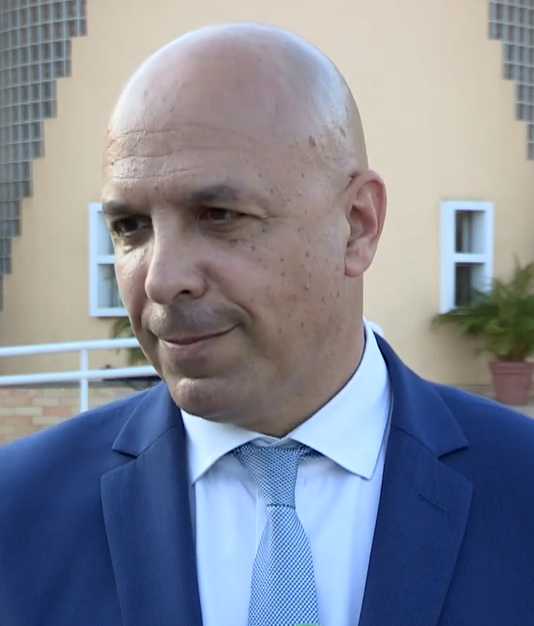
- Cafôfo in 2022

Secretary of State for the Portuguese Communities
- In office 30 March 2022 – 2 April 2024
- Prime Minister: António Costa
- Preceded by: Berta Nunes
- Succeeded by: José Cesário

Member of the Legislative Assembly of Madeira
- In office 15 October 2019 – 6 October 2021

President of the Municipal Chamber of Funchal
- In office 21 October 2013 – 1 June 2019
- Deputy: Filipa Jardim Fernandes; Idalina Perestrelo; Miguel Silva Gouveia
- Preceded by: Miguel Albuquerque
- Succeeded by: Miguel Silva Gouveia

President of the Socialist Party of Madeira
- In office 25 July 2020 – 19 February 2021
- Preceded by: Sérgio Gonçalves
- In office 2 December 2023 – 13 December 2025

Member of the Assembly of the Republic
- In office 26 March 2024 – 2 June 2025
- Constituency: Madeira

Personal details
- Born: Paulo Alexandre Nascimento Cafôfo; 18 May 1971 (age 54) Funchal, Madeira
- Party: Socialist
- Children: 2
- Education: University of Coimbra

Paulo Alexandre Nascimento Cafôfo (born 18 May 1971) is a Portuguese teacher and politician who has been active in the politics of Madeira and has been the president of the Socialist Party of Madeira from 2020 to 2021, and since 2023. In 2013, he led a coalition to defeat the Social Democratic Party for the first time in almost forty years. He was President of the Municipal Chamber of Funchal from 2013 to 2019, and served in the Legislative Assembly of Madeira from 2019 to 2021.

== Early life and education ==
Paulo Alexandre Nascimento Cafofo was born in Funchal, Madeira, Portugal, on 18 May 1971. He was educated at the Convent of Santa Clara. He graduated from the University of Coimbra with a history degree in 1995. He worked as a history teacher at multiple schools in Madeira and was the head of the Madeira Teachers' Union.

== Career ==
In the 2013 election Cafôfo led a coalition of parties to defeat the Social Democratic Party for the first time in almost forty years. In the 2017 election he formed the Confiança coalition with the Socialist Party (PS), Left Bloc, Together for the People, Democratic Republican Party, and the We, the Citizens! parties. From 2013 to 2019, he was President of the Municipal Chamber of Funchal. In 2019, he was elected to the Legislative Assembly of Madeira.

On 25 July 2020, Cafôfo was elected president of the PS in Madeira. He resigned from the assembly and as president of the PS after the party's poor results in the 2021 elections. On 2 December 2023, he was elected president of the PS with no opposition.

== Personal life ==
Cafôfo is the father of two children.

== Electoral history ==
=== Funchal City Council election, 2013 ===
Ballot: 29 September 2013
Party	Candidate	Votes	%	Seats	+/−
PS/BE/PND/MPT/PTP/PAN	Paulo Cafôfo	21,102	39.2	5	+3
PSD	Bruno Camacho Pereira	17,450	32.4	4	–3
CDS–PP	José Manuel Rodrigues	7,828	14.6	1	±0
CDU	Artur Andrade	4,504	8.4	1	±0
Blank/Invalid ballots		2,924	5.4	–	–
Turnout		53,808	50.46	11	±0
Source: Comissão Nacional de Eleições

=== Funchal City Council election, 2017 ===
Ballot: 1 October 2017
Party	Candidate	Votes	%	Seats	+/−
PS/BE/JPP/PDR/NC	Paulo Cafôfo	23,577	42.1	6	+1
PSD	Rubina Leal	17,971	32.1	4	±0
CDS–PP	Rui Barreto	4,819	8.6	1	±0
MPT/PPV/CDC	Roberto Vieira	2,258	4.0	0	±0
CDU	Artur Andrade	2,029	3.6	0	–1
PPM/PURP	Gil Canha	1,330	2.4	0	new
PTP	Raquel Coelho	1,252	2.2	0	±0
Other parties		501	0.9	0	±0
Blank/Invalid ballots		2,333	4.2	–	–
Turnout		56,070	52.75	11	±0
Source: Comissão Nacional de Eleições

=== Madeiran regional election, 2019 ===
Ballot: 22 September 2019
Party	Candidate	Votes	%	Seats	+/−
PSD	Miguel Albuquerque	56,449	39.4	21	–3
PS	Paulo Cafôfo	51,207	37.8	19	+14
CDS–PP	Rui Barreto	8,246	5.8	3	–4
JPP	Élvio Sousa	7,830	5.5	3	–2
CDU	Edgar Silva	7,060	1.8	1	–1
BE	Paulino Ascensão	2,489	1.7	0	–2
PAN	João Henrique de Freitas	2,095	1.5	0	±0
PURP	Rafael Macedo	1,766	1.2	0	new
RIR	Roberto Vieira	1,749	1.2	0	new
PTP	Raquel Coelho	1,426	1.0	0	–1
Other parties		4,132	2.9	0	–1
Blank/Invalid ballots		5,439	4.3	–	–
Turnout		143,200	55.50	47	±0
Source: Comissão Nacional de Eleições

=== Madeiran regional election, 2024 ===
Ballot: 26 May 2024
Party	Candidate	Votes	%	Seats	+/−
PSD	Miguel Albuquerque	49,104	36.1	19	–1
PS	Paulo Cafôfo	28,840	21.3	11	±0
JPP	Élvio Sousa	22,959	16.9	9	+4
CHEGA	Miguel Castro	12,562	9.2	4	±0
CDS–PP	José Manuel Rodrigues	5,374	4.0	2	–1
IL	Nuno Morna	3,481	2.6	1	±0
PAN	Mónica Freitas	2,531	1.9	1	±0
CDU	Edgar Silva	2,217	1.6	0	–1
BE	Roberto Almada	1,912	1.4	0	–1
Other parties		4,003	3.0	0	±0
Blank/Invalid ballots		2,793	2.1	–	–
Turnout		135,917	53.40	47	±0
Source: Comissão Nacional de Eleições

=== Madeiran regional election, 2025 ===
Ballot: 23 March 2025
Party	Candidate	Votes	%	Seats	+/−
PSD	Miguel Albuquerque	62,059	43.4	23	+4
JPP	Élvio Sousa	30,091	21.1	11	+2
PS	Paulo Cafôfo	22,351	15.6	8	–3
CHEGA	Miguel Castro	7,821	5.5	3	–1
CDS–PP	José Manuel Rodrigues	4,289	3.0	1	–1
IL	Gonçalo Maia Camelo	3,019	2.2	1	±0
CDU	Edgar Silva	2,543	1.8	0	±0
PAN	Mónica Freitas	2,323	1.6	0	–1
BE	Roberto Almada	1,586	1.1	0	±0
Other parties		3,503	2.4	0	±0
Blank/Invalid ballots		2,296	2.3	–	–
Turnout		142,959	55.98	47	±0
Source: Comissão Nacional de Eleições

== Works cited ==
=== News ===
- "Paulo Cafôfo eleito líder do PS-Madeira". Expresso. 2 December 2023. Archived from the original on 8 July 2025.
- Simões, Bruno (14 August 2016). "Paulo Cafôfo: Quem é o homem por detrás da máscara?". Jornal de Negócios. Archived from the original on 8 July 2025.

=== Web ===
- "Biography". Assembly of the Republic. Archived from the original on 8 July 2025.
- "Paulo Cafôfo". Paulo Cafôfo. Archived from the original on 24 November 2017.
- "Paulo Cafôfo: Secretário de Estado das Comunidades Portuguesas". Portugal. Archived from the original on 8 July 2025.
