= Manuel António Correia =

Portuguese lawyer and politician (born 1965)

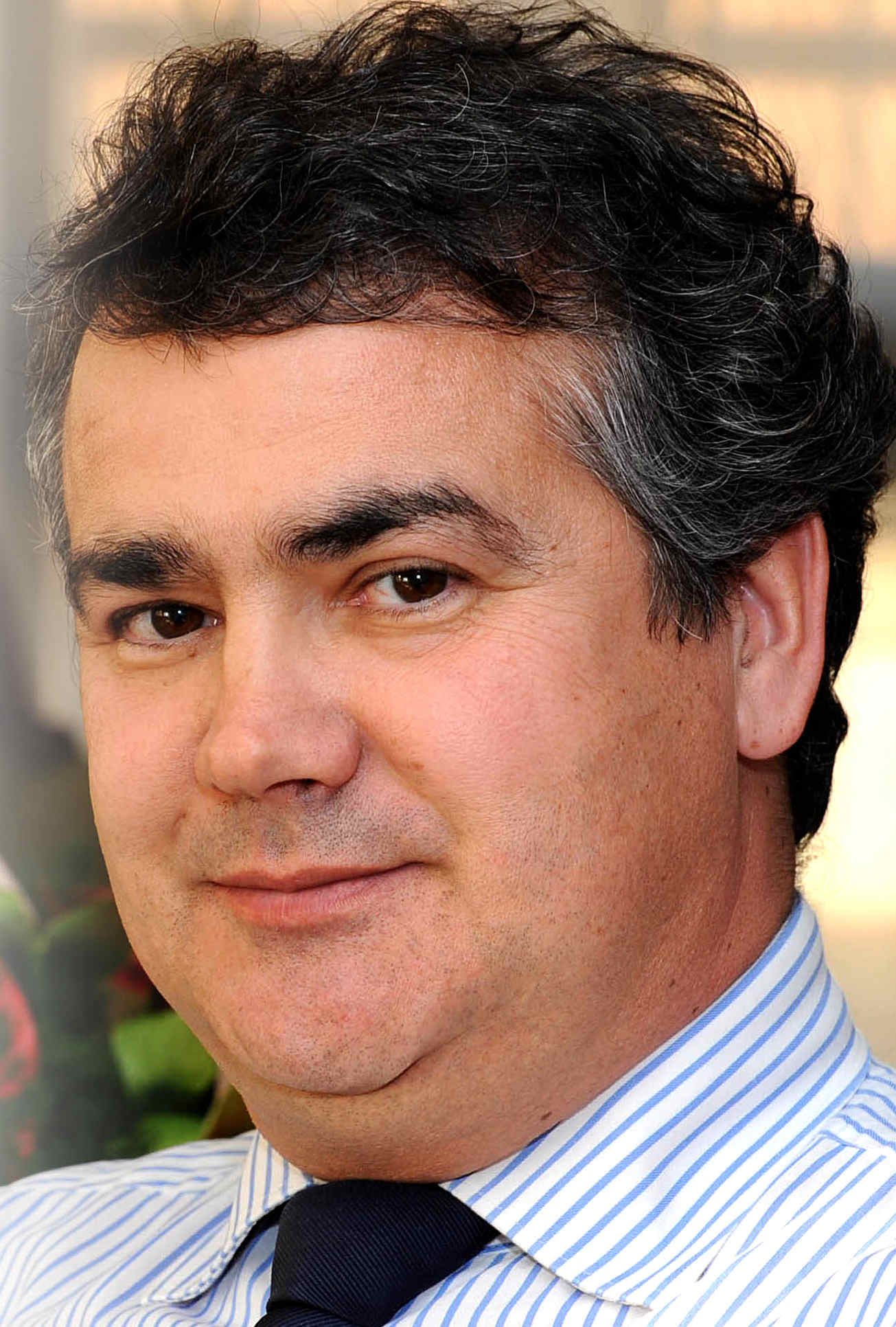
- Manuel Antonio Correia in the early 2010s

Regional Secretary for the Environment and Natural Resources
- In office 14 November 2000 – 20 April 2015
- President: Alberto João Jardim
- Preceded by: Jorge Jardim Fernandes; Jorge Bazenga Marques
- Succeeded by: Susana Prada; Humberto Vasconcelos

Chairman of the Board of Directors of the Regional Housing Institute
- In office 30 October 1997 – 14 November 2000

Personal details
- Born: Manuel António Rodrigues Correia; 19 February 1965 (age 61) Canhas, Ponta do Sol, Portugal
- Party: Social Democratic Party (1989–present)
- Other political affiliations: Social Democratic Youth
- Children: 2
- Education: University of Lisbon
- Occupation: Lawyer • Politician

Manuel António Correia (Ponta do Sol, Madeira, 19 February 1965) is a Portuguese lawyer and politician who served as Regional Secretary for the Environment and Natural Resources in the Government of Autonomous Region of Madeira between 2000 and 2015.

== Career ==
He graduated in law from the Faculty of Law of the University of Lisbon in 1989.

He joined the staff of the Regional Directorate for Public and Local Administration as a 2nd class senior technician on 2 November 1989, where he worked as a legal consultant. On 1 December 1992, he was appointed director of the legal office of the Madeira Housing Institute. By Resolution of the Council of Government taken on 6 January 1994, he was appointed to the position of member of the board of directors of the Madeira Housing Institute.

By Resolution of the Council of Government taken on 30 October 1997, he was appointed chairman of the board of directors of the Housing Institute of the Autonomous Region of Madeira, a position he held until 14 November 2000.

On 14 November 2000, by Decree No. 4/2000 of the Minister of the Republic for the Autonomous Region of Madeira, he was appointed regional secretary for the environment and natural resources.

By Decree of the Minister of the Republic for the Autonomous Region of Madeira no. 4/2004, of 16 November 2004, he was reappointed Regional Secretary for the Environment and Natural Resources, being reappointed in 2007 a post he left in 2015.

He has a professional career as a lawyer and several training courses, including the Advanced Management Programme for Executives, taught by the Postgraduate School of the Faculty of Economic and Business Sciences of the Portuguese Catholic University.

He was a leader of party youth, a member of the Funchal Municipal Assembly and a member of the PSD/Madeira Regional Political Commission. He was candidate for the leadership of PSD/Madeira in the internal elections to succeed Alberto João Jardim in 2015, but lost in the second round against Miguel Albuquerque, the current leader of PSD/Madeira and President of the Regional Government.

He later challenged Albuquerque's presidency in 2024 twice, due to the corruption scandals surrounding the president of the Regional Government.
