= Politics of Madeira =

The politics of Madeira, Portugal, takes place in the framework of a semi-presidential representative democracy and of a pluriform multi-party system. The Representative of the Republic exercises some reserve powers on behalf of the President of the Portuguese Republic. Executive power is exercised by the Regional Government. Legislative power is vested in the Legislative Assembly. All government's offices are headquartered in Funchal, Madeira's capital city.

== History ==
In the years immediately after the Carnation Revolution in 1974, a small clandestine far-right independence movement – the Madeira Archipelago Liberation Front (FLAMA) – was created in response to the perceived communist threat in the country's central government and carried out several bomb attacks.

The current Portuguese Constitution, in force since 25 April 1976, granted political and administrative autonomy to the Madeiran and the Azorian archipelagoes and turned the local government throughout the country democratically elected. The first election for the Regional Assembly were held in that year. Jaime Ornelas Camacho was the first President of the Regional Government.

Since the archipelago gained political autonomy from mainland Portugal in 1976, the centre-right Social Democratic Party (PSD) has always been in power, winning 11 absolute majorities in a row over 43 years, and until recently it had always ruled most municipalities. From 1978 to 2015, Alberto João Jardim was the sole President of the Regional Government, winning a total of 9 elections. In 2015, former mayor of Funchal Miguel Albuquerque succeeded him. In 2019, for the first time since 1976, the PSD lost its parliamentary majority and was forced into a governmental coalition with the right-wing Popular Party.

Over the more than forty years of autonomy, a few Catholic priests stood out as some of the main political opposition figures against Alberto João Jardim's long-lasting rule, winning seats in parliament and municipalities for far-left (Communist Party and Popular Democratic Union) and centre-left parties (Socialist Party) and gathering disapproval from the Church local authorities.

== Regional elections since 1976 ==
Parties are listed from left-wing to right-wing.

Summary of elections for the Legislative Assembly of Madeira, 1976–2025
Election	UDP	BE	PCP	PEV	PS	PTP	MPT	PAN	JPP	PSD	CDS	PSN	PND	IL	CH	O/I	Turnout
1976	5.1		1.8		22.3					59.6	9.5					1.6	74.8
1980 (Note: In the 1980 election, the Communist Party (PCP) and the Portuguese Democratic Movement (MDP) ran in a joint coalition called United People Alliance (APU).)	5.5		3.1		15.0					65.3	6.5					4.6	80.9
1984 (Note: In the 1984 election, the Communist Party (PCP), Portuguese Democratic Movement (MDP) and the Ecologist Party "The Greens" (PEV) ran in a joint coalition called United People Alliance (APU).)	5.5		2.7		15.3					67.7	6.1					2.6	71.4
1988 (Note: After the 1988 elections, and still today, the Communist Party (PCP) and the Ecologist Party "The Greens" (PEV) run in a joint coalition called Unitary Democratic Coalition (CDU).)	7.7		2.0		16.8					62.4	8.2					2.9	67.6
1992	4.6		3.0		22.5					56.9	8.1	2.4				2.5	66.5
1996	4.0		4.0		24.8					56.9	7.3	0.6				2.3	65.3
2000	4.8		4.6		21.0					56.0	9.7	1.7				2.1	61.9
2004		3.7	5.5		27.4					53.7	7.0					2.7	60.5
2007		3.0	5.4		15.4			2.3		64.2	5.3		2.1			2.2	60.8
2011		1.7	3.8		11.5	6.9	1.9	2.1		48.6	17.6		3.3			2.6	57.4
2015		3.8	5.5		11.4				10.3	44.4	13.7		2.1			8.8	49.6
2019		1.7	1.8		35.8	1.0	0.4	1.5	5.5	39.4	5.8			0.5	0.4	6.3	55.5
2023 (Note: The Social Democratic Party (PSD) and the People's Party (CDS–PP) contested the 2023 election in a coalition called We are Madeira (SM) and won a combined 43.1% of the vote and elected 23 MP's to the regional assembly.)		2.2	2.7		21.3	1.0	0.5	2.3	11.0	43.1				2.6	8.9	4.3	53.3
2024		1.4	1.6		21.3	0.9	0.4	1.9	16.9	36.1	4.0			2.6	9.2	3.7	53.4
2025		1.1	1.8		15.6	0.6		1.6	21.1	43.4	3.0			2.2	5.5	4.1	56.0
Source: Comissão Nacional de Eleições

== Local government ==
Madeira is divided in 11 municípios (municipalities), with each of these being split into freguesias (civil parishes), which add up to a total of 54.

=== Municipalities ===
Municipality	Population	Mayor	Party	Chair of the Municipal Assembly	Party	Election
Calheta	10,867	Carlos Manuel Teles	PSD	Manuel Baeta de Castro	PSD	2021
Câmara de Lobos	33,675	Pedro Coelho	PSD	Manuel Pedro Freitas	PSD	2021
Funchal	104,024	Pedro Calado (2021–2024); Cristina Pedra (2024–)	PSD.CDS–PP	José Luís Nunes	PSD.CDS–PP	2021
Machico	19,981	Ricardo Franco	PS	João Bosco de Castro	PS	2021
Ponta do Sol	8,593	Célia Pecegueiro	PS	Carlos Manuel Coelho	PS	2021
Porto Moniz	2,342	Emanuel Câmara	PS	José Carlos Conceição	PS	2021
Porto Santo	5,202	Nuno Batista	PSD	Fátima Silva	PSD	2021
Ribeira Brava	12,435	Ricardo Nascimento	Independent	Rita Abreu	Independent	2021
Santa Cruz	45,281	Filipe Sousa	JPP	Maria Júlia Caré	JPP	2021
Santana	6,711	Dinarte Fernandes	CDS–PP	Martinho Rodrigues	CDS–PP	2021
São Vicente	5,143	José António Garcês	PSD.CDS–PP	Aires Santos	PSD.CDS–PP	2021

=== Parishes ===
Parishes with more than 10,000 inhabitants

Parish	Municipality	Pop.	Chair of the Council Assembly	Party	Chair of the Assembly	Party	Election
Santo António	Funchal	27,437	Ilídio de Castro	PSD.CDS–PP	Rui Santos	PSD.CDS–PP	2021
São Martinho	Funchal	26,464	Marco Gonçalves	PSD.CDS–PP	João Pimenta	PSD.CDS–PP	2021
Caniço	Santa Cruz	23,361	Milton Teixeira	JPP	Luís Gaspar	JPP	2021
Câmara de Lobos	Câmara de Lobos	17,978	Celso Bettencourt	PSD	Sónia Brazão	PSD	2021
Santa Maria Maior	Funchal	13,387	Guido Gomes	PS	Juvenal Rodrigues	PS	2021
Machico	Machico	11,249	Alberto Olim	PS	Alexandra Franco	PS	2021
Estreito de Câmara de Lobos	Câmara de Lobos	10,263	Gabriel Pereira	PSD	José Abreu	PSD	2021

== See also ==
- Madeira (Assembly of the Republic constituency)
- Politics of Portugal
