= 2004 Madeiran regional election =

- 17 October 2004

68 seats to the Legislative Assembly of Madeira 34 seats needed for a majority
- Turnout: 60.5% ▼1.4 pp
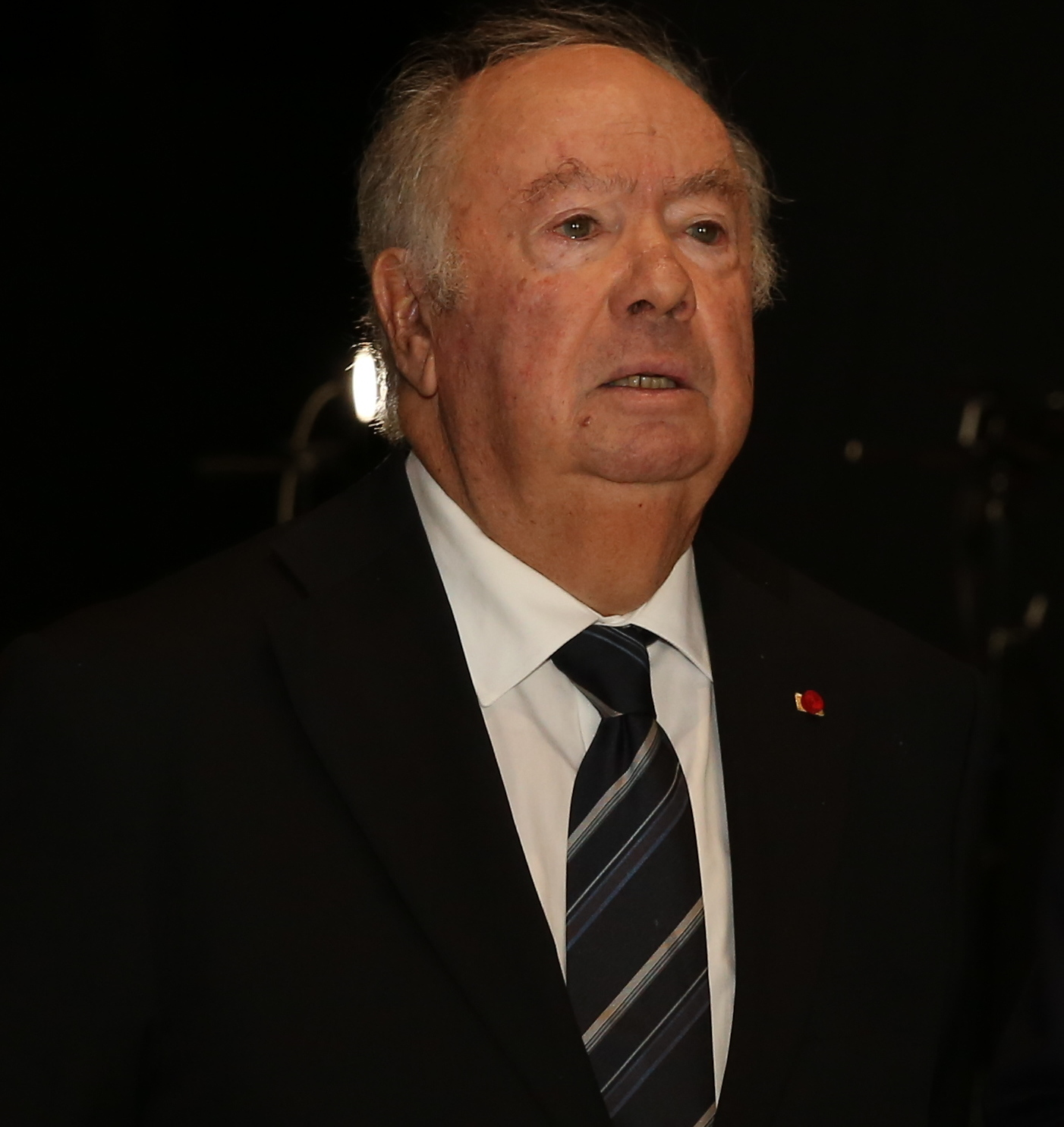

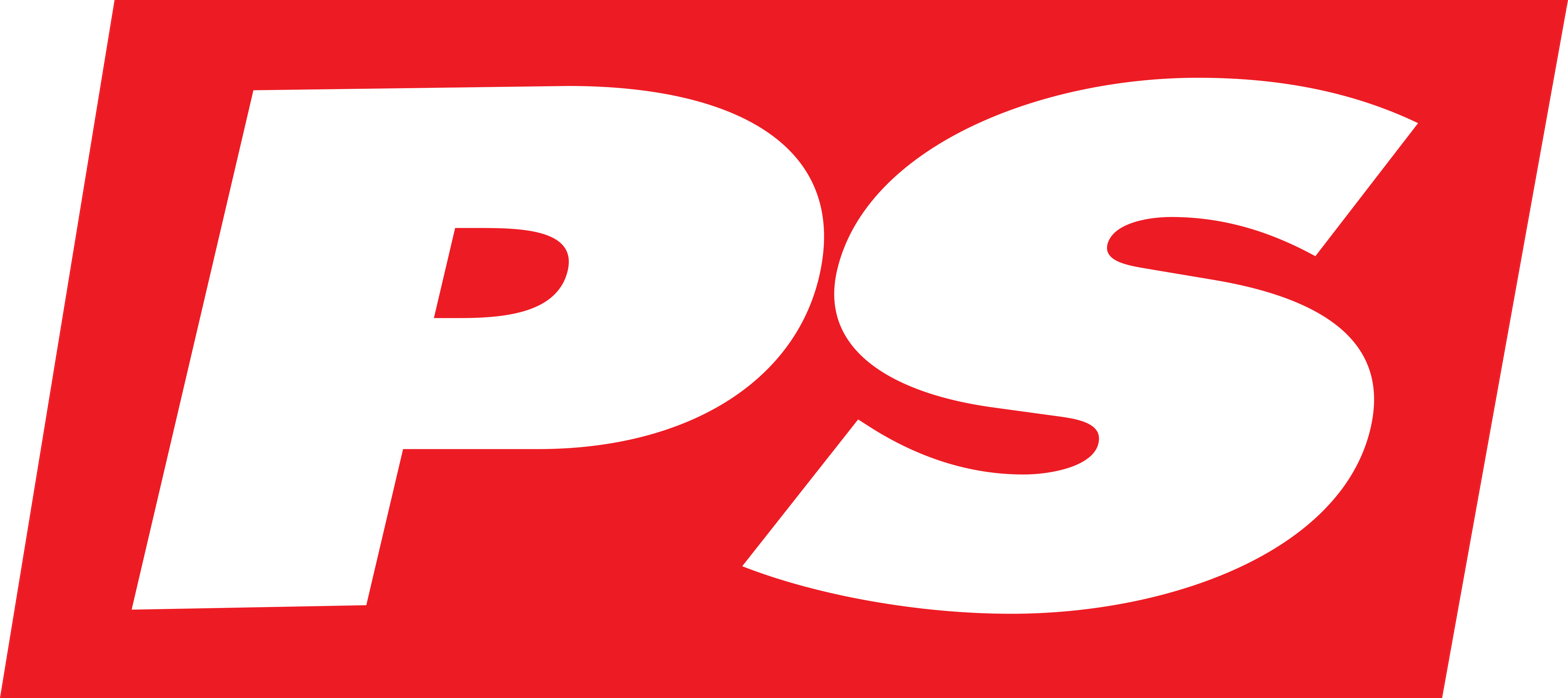

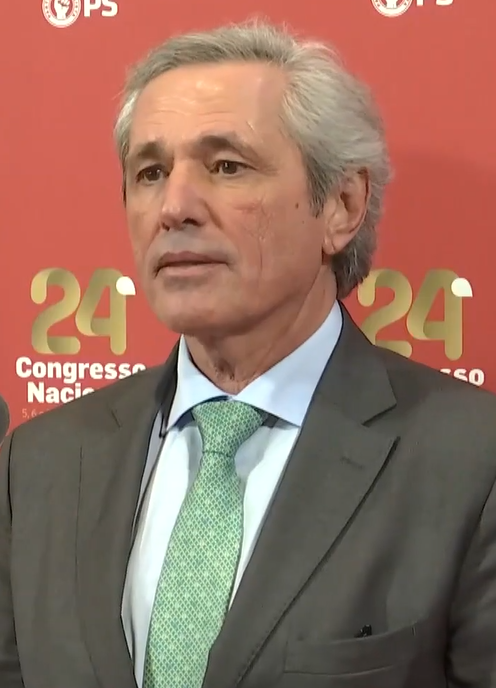

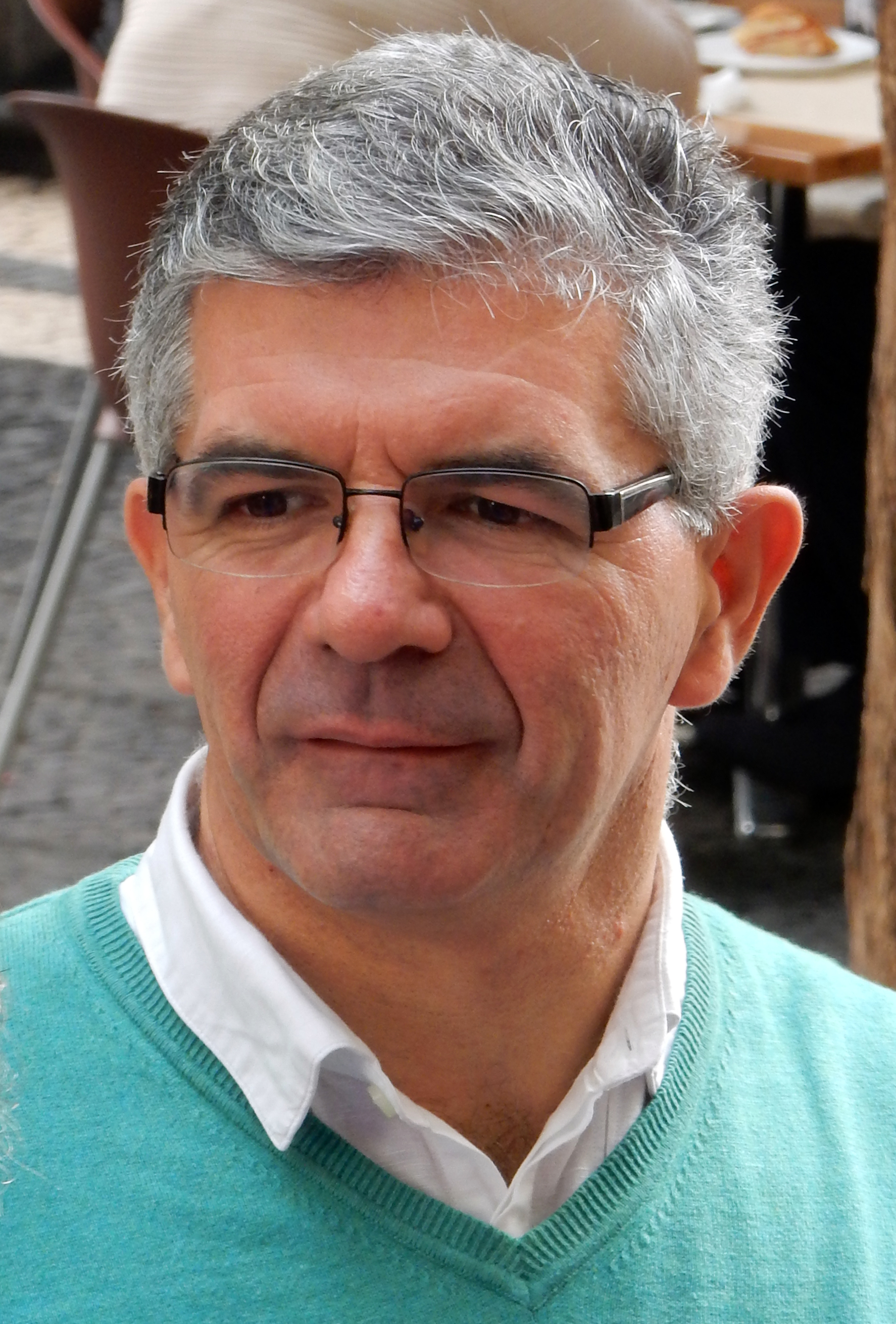

	First party	Second party	Third party
Leader	Alberto João Jardim	Jacinto Serrão de Freitas	José Manuel Rodrigues
Party	PSD	PS	CDS–PP
Leader's seat	Funchal	Funchal	Funchal
Last election	41 seats, 56.0%	13 seats, 21.0%	3 seats, 9.7%
Seats won	44	19	2
Seat change	▲3	▲6	▼1
Popular vote	73,973	37,751	9,691
Percentage	53.7%	27.4%	7.0%
Swing	▼2.2 pp	▲6.4 pp	▼2.7 pp
	Fourth party	Fifth party
Leader	Edgar Silva	Paulo Martins
Party	CDU	BE
Leader's seat	Funchal	Funchal
Last election	2 seats, 4.8%	Did not contest
Seats won	2	1
Seat change	0	▲1
Popular vote	7,590	5,035
Percentage	5.5%	3.7%
Swing	▲0.9 pp	New party
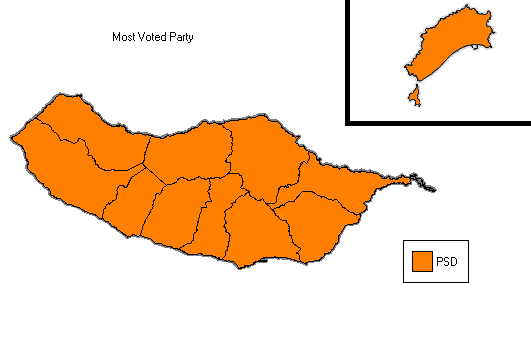
- The most voted party in each municipality.
President before election
Alberto João Jardim
PSD
Elected President
Alberto João Jardim
PSD

A regional election was held in Madeira on 17 October 2004, to determine the composition of the Legislative Assembly of the Autonomous Region of Madeira. All 68 members of the regional parliament were up for an election, an increase of 6 compared with 2000.

The winner of the election in Madeira was, once more, the Social Democratic Party, and Alberto João Jardim was elected president of the Regional Government with an absolute majority for an 8th consecutive time. The percentage gathered by the Social Democrats decreased by 2 points, however, due to the increase of the overall number of MPs, the party gained 3 seats and achieved 44 seats. The People's Party decreased its voting share and its number of MPs, gathering just 2 seats, one of their worst performances.

On the left, the Socialist Party achieved one of their best result till that date, only surpassed by the results in the 2019 elections, by winning more than 27 percent of the votes and election 19 members to the regional parliament. The Unitary Democratic Coalition, led by the Portuguese Communist Party, was able to hold on to their 2000 voting share and the 2 MPs of the previous election. The Left Bloc elected one MPs in their first run for the Madeira regional parliament and gathered 3.7 percent of the votes.

Voter turnout was lower, compared with 2000, with 60.5 percent of the electorate casting their ballot on election day.

== Electoral system ==
In this election, the members of the regional parliament were elected in 11 constituencies, representing the 11 municipalities of Madeira, that were awarded a determined number of member to elect according with the number of registered voters in those constituencies. The method use to elect the members was the D'Hondt method. In this election the number of MPs to be elected rose from 61 in 2000 to 68.

Constituency	Total MPs	Registered voters
Calheta	3	10,858
Câmara de Lobos	8	26,260
Funchal	29	100,126
Machico	6	19,694
Ponta do Sol	2	7,918
Porto Moniz	2	3,153
Porto Santo	2	4,190
Ribeira Brava	3	11,805
Santa Cruz	8	27,117
Santana	3	8,831
São Vicente	2	6,181
Total	68	226,133

== Political parties ==
A total of 5 political parties presented lists of candidates for the regional elections in Madeira, where 277,774 electors could elect 68 deputies to the Legislative Assembly. The list of parties running was the following:

- Left Bloc (BE), leader Paulo Martinho Martins
- Democratic Unity Coalition (CDU), leader Edgar Silva
- People's Party (CDS-PP), leader José Manuel Rodrigues
- Socialist Party (PS), leader Jacinto Serrão de Freitas
- Social Democratic Party (PSD), leader Alberto João Jardim

== Results ==
=== Summary of votes and seats ===
Summary of the 17 October 2004 Legislative Assembly of Madeira elections results
Graph of the party split among 68 seats.
Parties	Votes	%	±pp swing	MPs				
Parties	Votes	%	±pp swing	2000	2004	±	%	±
Social Democratic	73,973	53.71	▼2.2	41	44	▲3	64.71	▼2.5
Socialist	37,751	27.41	▲6.4	13	19	▲6	27.94	▲6.6
People's	9,691	7.04	▼2.7	3	2	▼1	2.94	▼2.0
Unitary Democratic Coalition	7,590	5.51	▲0.9	2	2	0	2.94	▼0.4
Left Bloc	5,035	3.66	—N/a	—N/a	1	—N/a	1.47	—N/a
Total valid	134,040	97.31	▼0.6	61	68	▲7	100.00	0.0
Blank ballots	1,425	1.03	▲0.1					
Invalid ballots	2,269	1.65	▲0.4					
Total	137,734	100.00						
Registered voters/turnout	227,774	60.47	▼1.4					
Source: Comissão Nacional de Eleições

Vote share
PSD	53.71%
PS	27.41%
CDS-PP	7.04%
CDU	5.51%
BE	3.66%
Blank/Invalid	2.68%

Parliamentary seats
PSD	64.71%
PS	27.94%
CDS-PP	2.94%
CDU	2.94%
BE	1.47%

=== Distribution by constituency ===
Results of the 2004 election of the Legislative Assembly of Madeira by constituency
Constituency	%	S	%	S	%	S	%	S	%	S	Total S
Constituency	PSD		PS		CDS-PP		CDU		BE		Total S
Calheta	67.7	3	8.1	-	19.4	-	1.6	-	1.0	-	3
Câmara de Lobos	64.1	6	19.4	2	5.8	-	5.2	-	3.1	-	8
Funchal	46.6	15	28.7	9	7.5	2	8.7	2	5.6	1	29
Machico	55.8	4	36.6	2	2.5	-	1.8	-	1.4	-	6
Ponta do Sol	54.7	1	35.2	1	6.0	-	1.0	-	1.6	-	2
Porto Moniz	64.3	2	30.2	-	2.6	-	0.7	-	0.6	-	2
Porto Santo	55.5	1	38.0	1	2.0	-	1.1	-	0.7	-	2
Ribeira Brava	66.9	3	18.7	-	6.4	-	2.5	-	2.5	-	3
Santa Cruz	49.8	5	31.2	3	7.1	-	5.5	-	3.6	-	8
Santana	66.7	3	21.6	-	6.3	-	1.2	-	1.3	-	3
São Vicente	52.3	1	35.8	1	6.0	-	0.8	-	1.5	-	2
Total	53.7	44	27.4	19	7.0	2	5.5	2	3.7	1	68
Source: Comissão Nacional de Eleições

=== Maps ===
Most voted political force by municipality.

== See also ==
- Madeira
