= 2000 Madeiran regional election =

- 15 October 2000

61 seats to the Legislative Assembly of Madeira 31 seats needed for a majority
- Turnout: 61.9% ▼3.4 pp
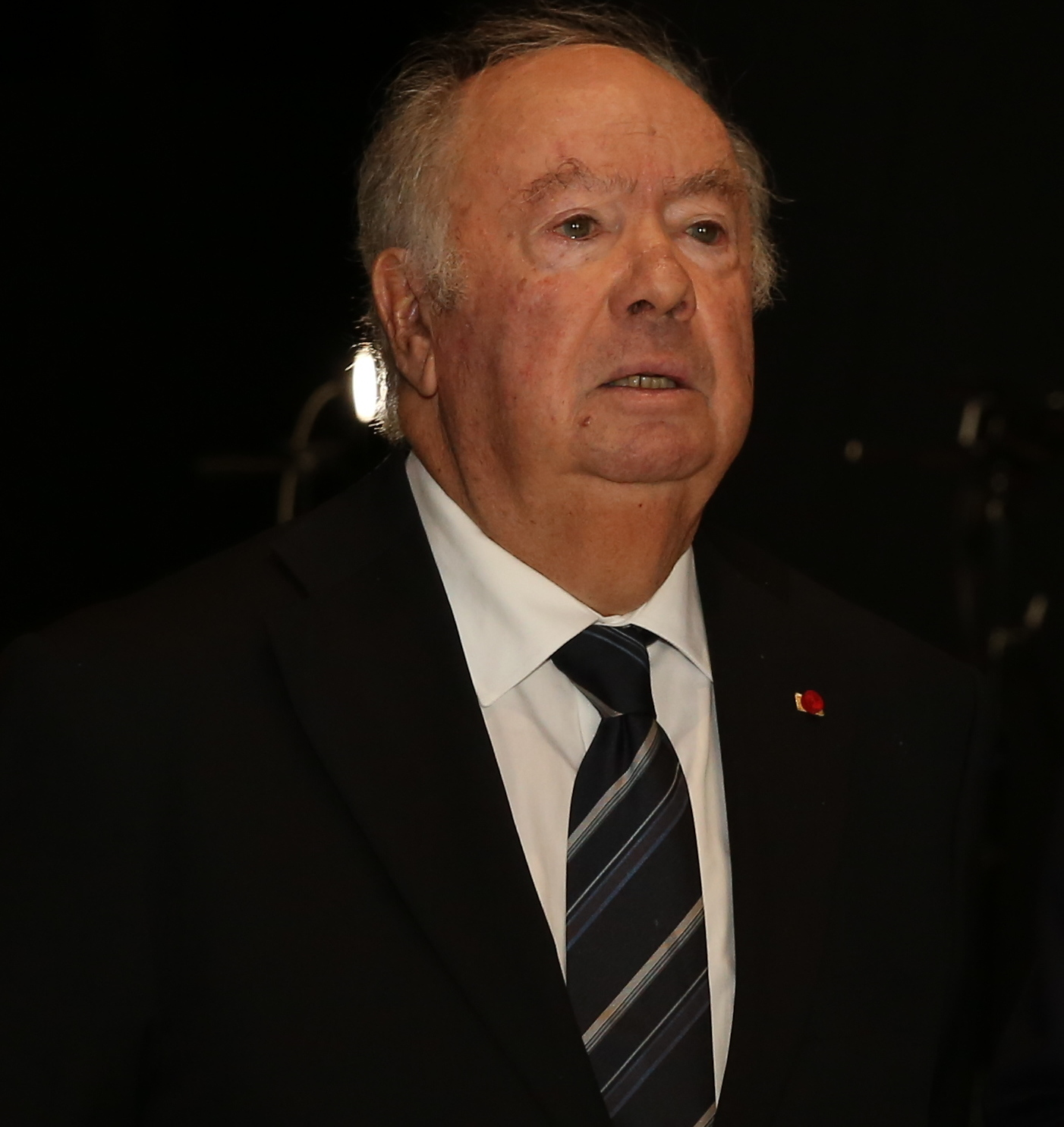

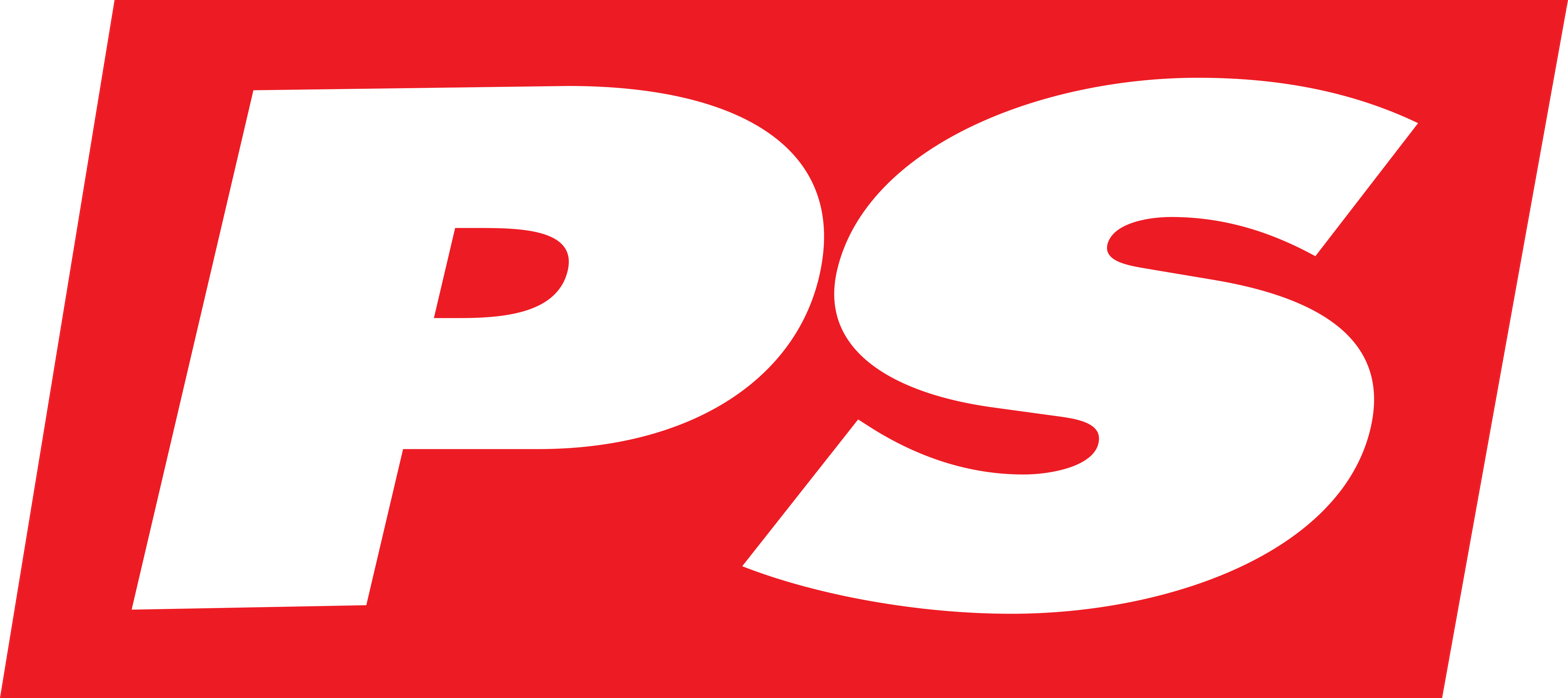

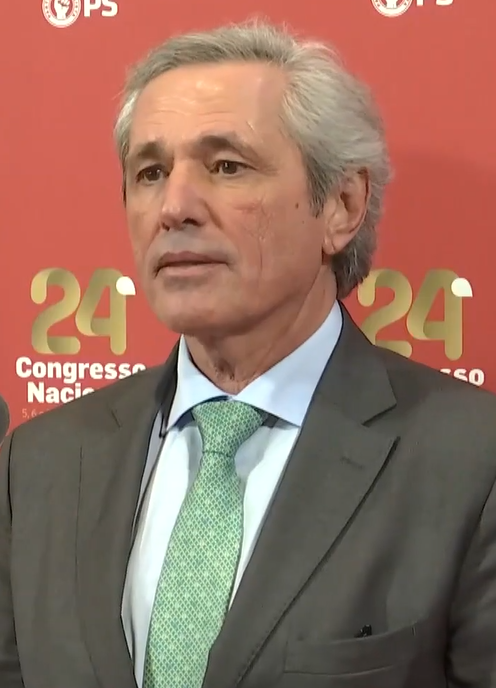

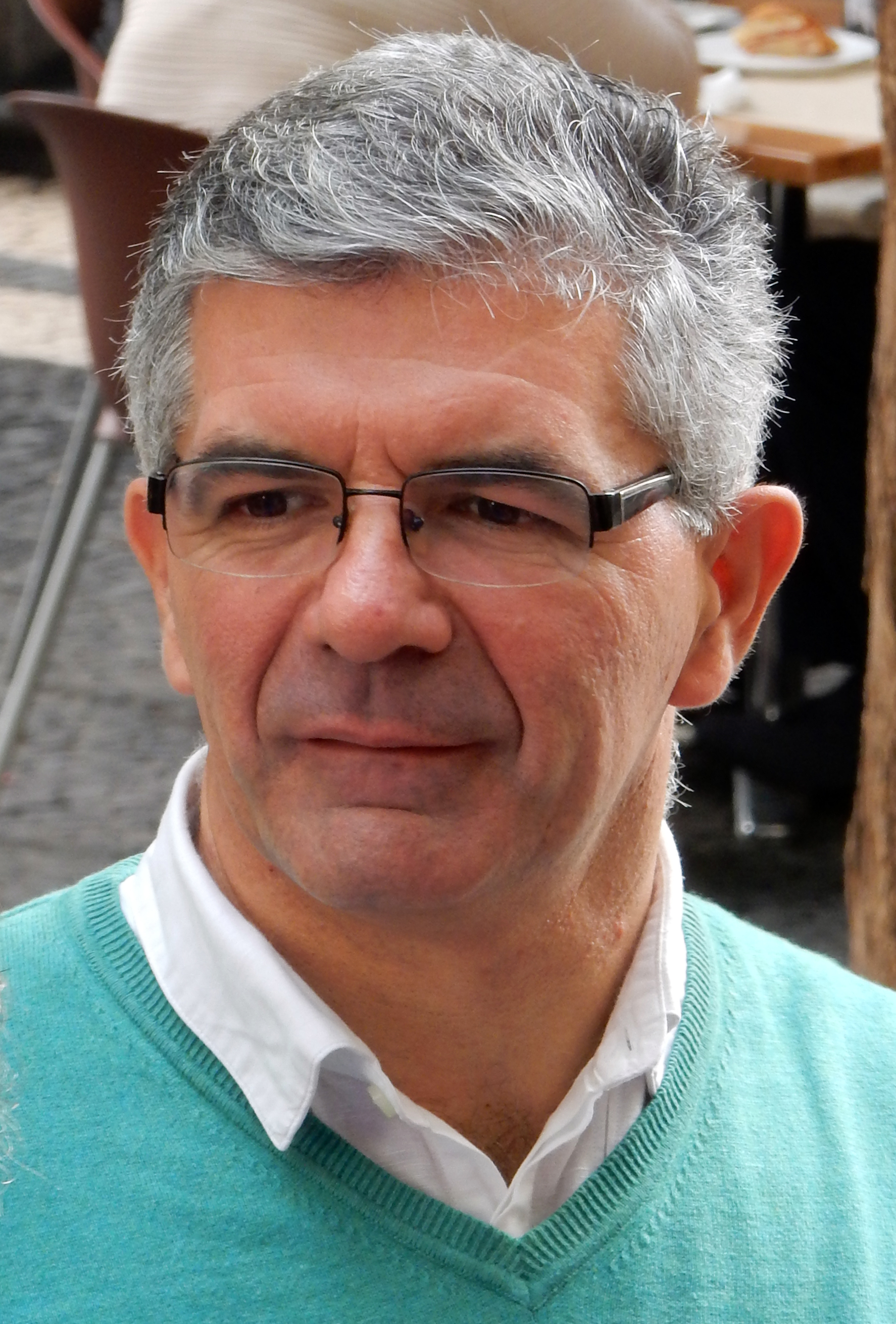
	First party	Second party	Third party
Leader	Alberto João Jardim	José Mota Torres	José Manuel Rodrigues
Party	PSD	PS	CDS–PP
Leader's seat	Funchal	Funchal	Funchal
Last election	41 seats, 56.9%	13 seats, 24.8%	2 seats, 9.7%
Seats won	41	13	3
Seat change	0	0	▲1
Popular vote	72,588	27,290	12,612
Percentage	56.0%	21.0%	9.7%
Swing	▼0.9 pp	▼3.8 pp	▲2.4 pp
	Fourth party	Fifth party
Leader	Paulo Martins	Edgar Silva
Party	UDP	CDU
Leader's seat	Funchal	Funchal
Last election	1 seat, 4.0%	2 seats, 4.0%
Seats won	2	2
Seat change	▲1	0
Popular vote	6,210	6,015
Percentage	4.8%	4.6%
Swing	▲0.8 pp	▲0.6 pp
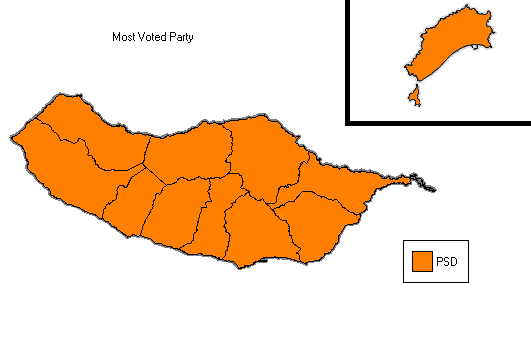
- The most voted party in each municipality.
President before election
Alberto João Jardim
PSD
Elected President
Alberto João Jardim
PSD

The 2000 Madeira Regional Election (Portuguese: Eleições Regionais da Madeira de 2000) was an election held on 15 October 2000 to elect the 61 members of the regioanl legislative assembly for the Portuguese autonomous region of the Madeira. There was an increase of two more seats in dispute, compared with the previous election, distributed by the 11 municipalities of the archipelago, proportionally to the number of registered voters of each municipality.

The winner of the election in Madeira was, once more, the Social Democratic Party, and Alberto João Jardim was elected president of the Regional Government with an absolute majority for the 7th consecutive time. The percentage gathered by the Social Democrats decreased by one percentage point, however, due to the increase of the overall number of MPs, the party kept their 41 mandates.

The People's Party increased its voting and its number of MPs, gathering a total of 3 mandates.

On the left, the Socialist Party kept its 13 MPs after, despite losing more than 3 percent of the votes. The Unitary Democratic Coalition, led by the Portuguese Communist Party, increased the voting and kept the 2 Mps of the previous election. The People's Democratic Union raised the number of MPs from 1 to 2 after a slight increase of the voting.

Voter turnout was lower, compared with 1996, with 61.9 percent of the electorate casting their ballot on election day.

== Electoral system ==
In this election, the members of the regional parliament were elected in 11 constituencies, representing the 11 municipalities of Madeira, that were awarded a determined number of member to elect according with the number of registered voters in those constituencies. The method use to elect the members was the D'Hondt method. In this election the number of MPs to be elected rose from 59 in 1996 to 61.

Constituency	Total MPs	Registered voters
Calheta	3	10,288
Câmara de Lobos	6	22,667
Funchal	28	96,465
Machico	5	18,618
Ponta do Sol	2	6,963
Porto Moniz	2	3,062
Porto Santo	2	3,934
Ribeira Brava	3	11,066
Santa Cruz	6	22,004
Santana	2	8,535
São Vicente	2	5,886
Total	61	209,488

== Political parties ==
A total of 6 political parties presented lists of candidates for the regional elections in Madeira, where 209,541 electors could elect 61 deputies to the Legislative Assembly. The list of parties running was the following:

- Democratic Unity Coalition (CDU), an alliance of the Greens and Portuguese Communist Party (PCP).
- People's Democratic Union (UDP).
- People's Party (CDS-PP)
- National Solidarity Party (PSN)
- Socialist Party (PS), leader José Carlos Pinto Basto da Mota Torres.
- Social Democratic Party (PSD), leader Alberto João Jardim.

== Results ==
=== Summary of votes and seats ===
Summary of the 15 October 2000 Legislative Assembly of Madeira elections results
Graph of the party split among 61 seats.
Parties	Votes	%	±pp swing	MPs				
Parties	Votes	%	±pp swing	1996	2000	±	%	±
Social Democratic	72,588	55.95	▼0.9	41	41	0	67.21	▼2.3
Socialist	27,290	21.04	▼3.8	13	13	0	21.31	▼0.7
People's	12,612	9.72	▲2.4	2	3	▲1	4.92	▲1.5
People's Democratic Union	6,210	4.79	▲0.8	1	2	▲1	3.28	▲1.6
Democratic Unity Coalition	6,015	4.64	▲0.6	2	2	0	3.28	▼0.1
National Solidarity	2,243	1.73	▲1.1	0	0	0	0.00	0.0
Total valid	126,958	97.86	▼0.3	59	61	▲2	100.00	0.0
Blank ballots	1,136	0.88	▲0.2					
Invalid ballots	1,640	1.26	▲0.2					
Total	129,734	100.00						
Registered voters/turnout	209,541	61.91	▼3.4					
Source: Comissão Nacional de Eleições

Vote share
PSD	55.95%
PS	21.04%
CDS-PP	9.72%
UDP	4.79%
CDU	4.64%
PSN	1.73%
Blank/Invalid	2.14%

Parliamentary seats
PSD	67.21%
PS	21.31%
CDS-PP	4.92%
UDP	3.28%
CDU	3.28%

=== Distribution by constituency ===
Results of the 2000 election of the Legislative Assembly of Madeira by constituency
Constituency	%	S	%	S	%	S	%	S	%	S	Total S
Constituency	PSD		PS		CDS-PP		UDP		CDU		Total S
Calheta	66.3	3	7.4	-	21.8	-	1.3	-	0.9	-	3
Câmara de Lobos	67.8	5	15.1	1	6.7	-	3.3	-	4.4	-	6
Funchal	50.2	15	19.3	6	10.7	3	7.3	2	7.5	2	28
Machico	56.1	3	31.3	2	5.3	-	2.6	-	2.3	-	5
Ponta do Sol	59.0	2	28.0	-	8.5	-	2.0	-	0.5	-	2
Porto Moniz	57.8	1	33.6	1	5.4	-	0.6	-	0.7	-	2
Porto Santo	50.2	1	43.1	1	2.6	-	1.4	-	0.3	-	2
Ribeira Brava	69.2	3	13.7	-	10.1	-	0.8	-	1.2	-	3
Santa Cruz	52.5	4	26.4	2	9.8	-	4.1	-	3.4	-	6
Santana	63.6	2	22.7	-	7.4	-	2.0	-	0.9	-	2
São Vicente	60.9	2	23.5	-	9.5	-	2.0	-	0.9	-	2
Total	56.0	41	21.0	13	9.7	3	4.8	2	4.6	2	61
Source: Comissão Nacional de Eleições

=== Maps ===
Most voted political force by municipality.

== See also ==
- 2000 Azores regional election
