= Achadinha (disambiguation) =

Achadinha is a parish in the municipality of Nordeste, Azores, Portugal.

Achadinha may refer also refer to:

- A hamlet in the village of Boaventura in the municipality of São Vicente, Azores, Portugal
- A hamlet in the parish of Camacha in the municipality of Santa Cruz, Madeira, Portugal
- A hamlet of the parish of Gaula, Madeira, Portugal
- Achadinha do Pico, a hamlet in the parish of Gaula, Madeira, Portugal
- A subdivision of the parish of Porto da Cruz, Madeira, Portugal
- Achadinha (Praia) - a city district of Praia, Cape Verde
- Achadinha Pires, a city district of Praia, Cape Verde
