= 1996 Madeiran regional election =

- 13 October 1996

59 seats to the Legislative Assembly of Madeira 30 seats needed for a majority
- Turnout: 65.3% ▼1.2 pp
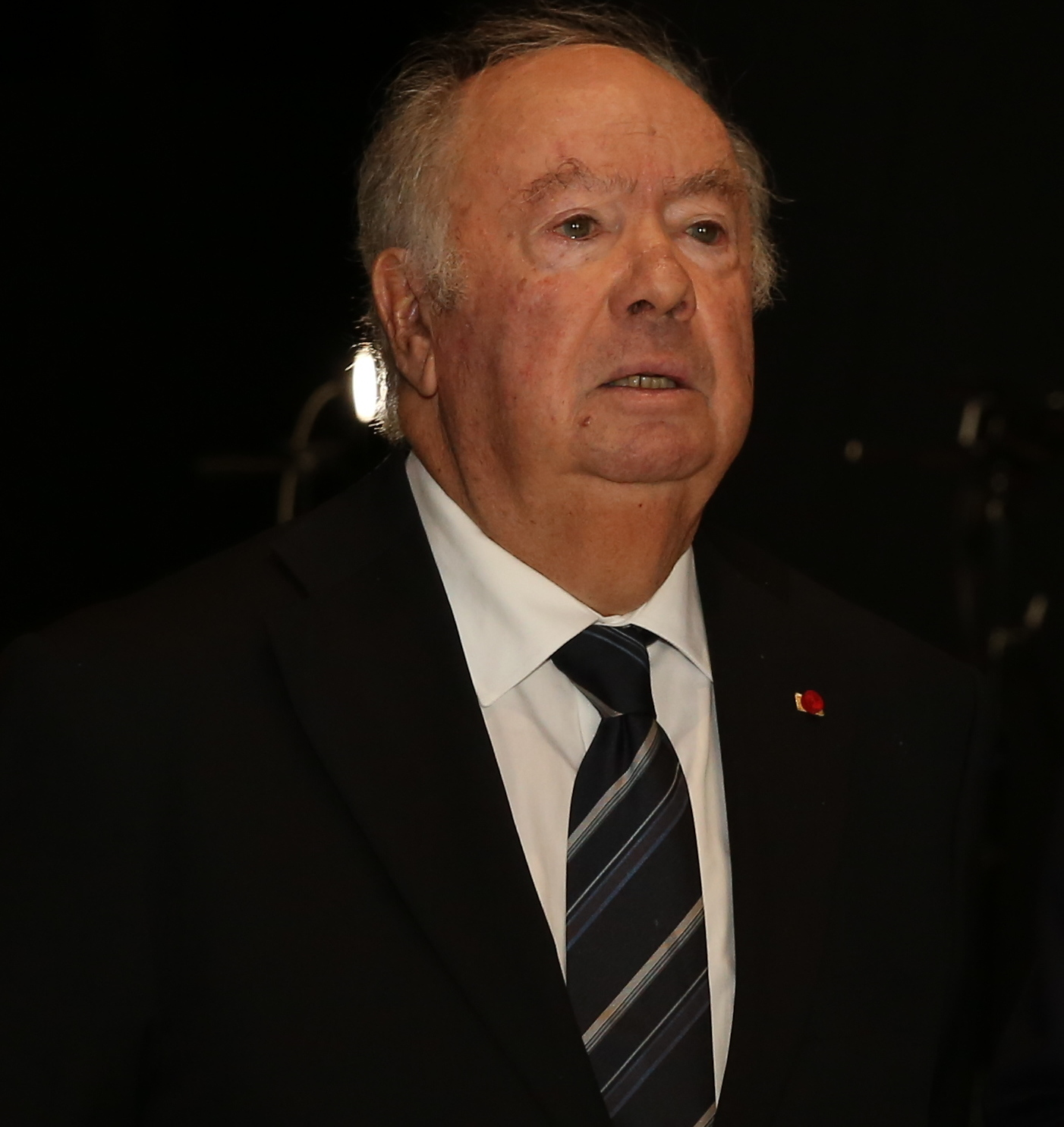

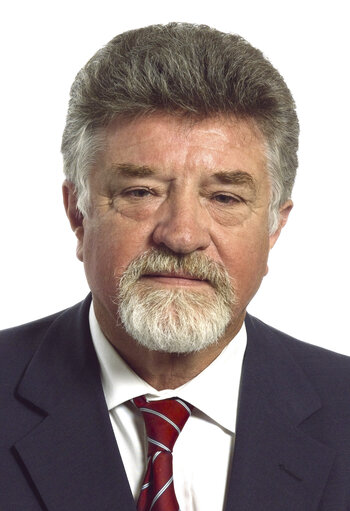

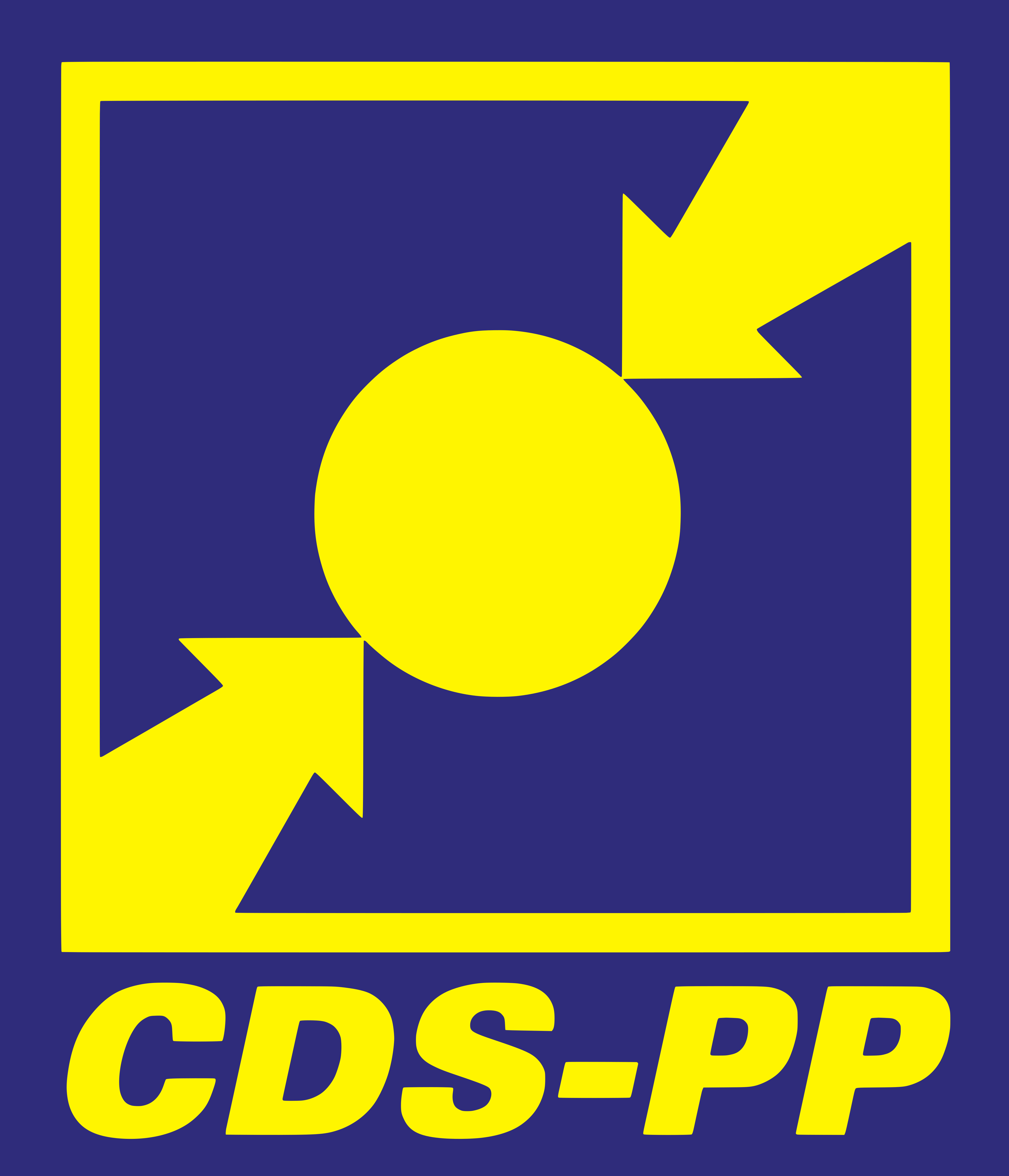

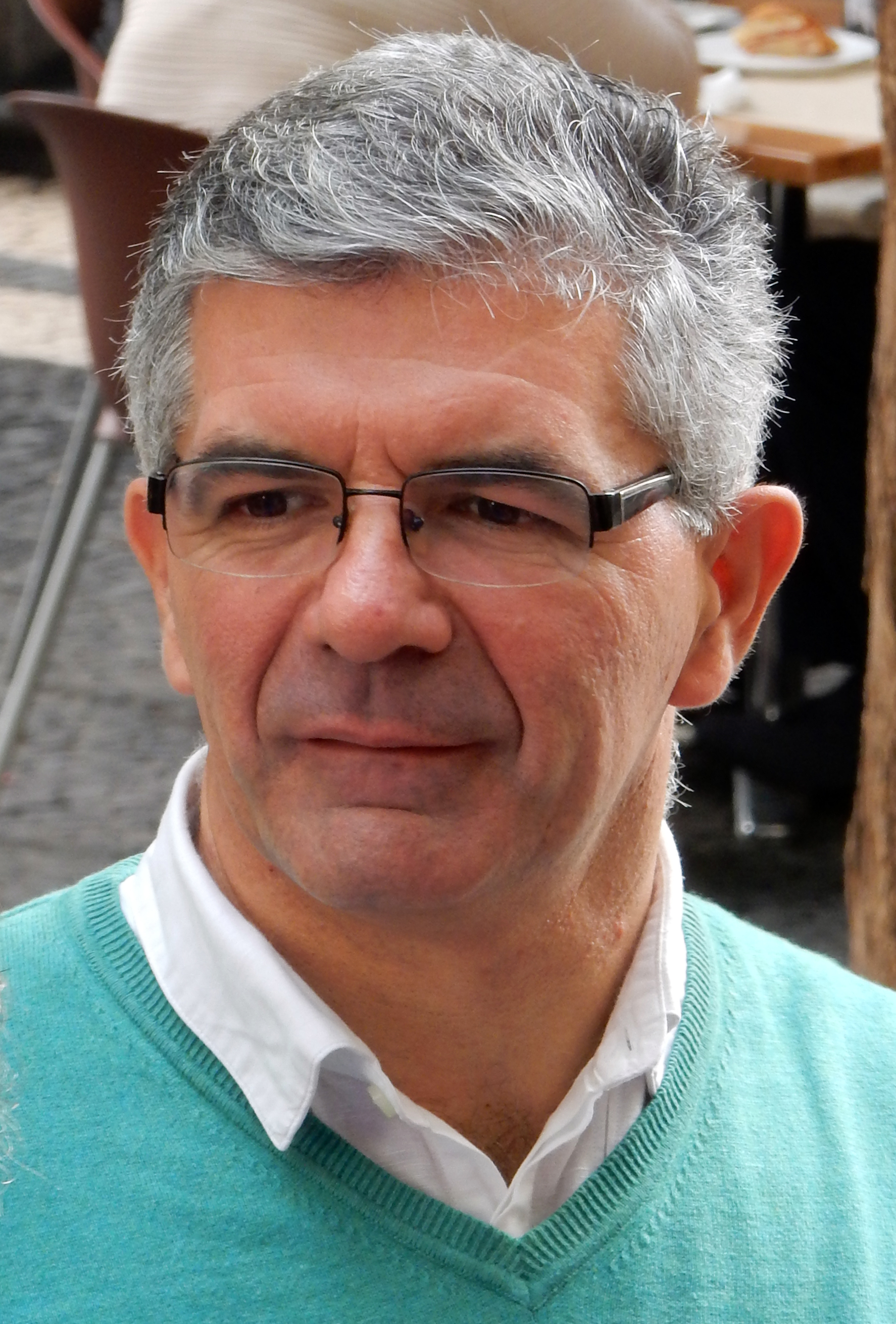

	First party	Second party	Third party
Leader	Alberto João Jardim	Emanuel Fernandes	Ricardo Vieira
Party	PSD	PS	CDS–PP
Leader's seat	Funchal	Funchal	Funchal
Last election	39 seats, 56.9%	12 seats, 22.5%	2 seats, 8.1%
Seats won	41	13	2
Seat change	▲2	▲1	0
Popular vote	77,365	33,790	9,950
Percentage	56.9%	24.8%	7.3%
Swing	▲0.0 pp	▲2.3 pp	▼0.8 pp
	Fourth party	Fifth party
Leader	Edgar Silva	Paulo Martins
Party	CDU	UDP
Leader's seat	Funchal	Funchal
Last election	1 seat, 3.0%	2 seats, 4.6%
Seats won	2	1
Seat change	▲1	▼1
Popular vote	5,495	5,485
Percentage	4.0%	4.0%
Swing	▲1.0 pp	▼0.6 pp
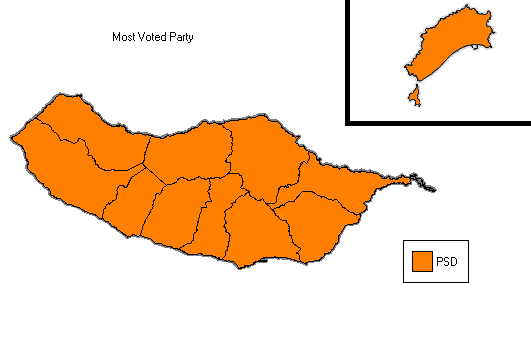
- The most voted party in each municipality.
President before election
Alberto João Jardim
PSD
Elected President
Alberto João Jardim
PSD

The 1996 Madeiran regional election (Portuguese: Eleições Regionais da Madeira de 1996) was an election held on 13 October 1996 to elect the 59 members of the regioanl legislative assembly for the Portuguese autonomous region of the Madeira

The winner of the election in Madeira was, once more, the Social Democratic Party, and Alberto João Jardim was elected president of the Regional Government with an absolute majority for the 6th consecutive time. The percentage gathered by the Social Democrats was virtually the same of the previous election, however, due to the populational growth of the region, the number of MPs was increased from 57 to 59, and so, the social democrats gained 2 MPs, achieving a total of 41.

The People's Party lost some of its voters, but still managed to keep the 2 MPs, unlike the National Solidarity Party that lost its single MP.

On the left, the Socialist Party increased the voting by 1 percentage point and received one more MP. The Unitary Democratic Coalition, led by the Portuguese Communist Party, increased the voting and the number of MPs, stealing one MP from the People's Democratic Union that elected only 1 MP.

Voter turnout was slightly lower, compared with 1992, with 65.3 percent of the electorate casting their ballot on election day.

== Electoral system ==
In this election, the members of the regional parliament were elected in 11 constituencies, representing the 11 municipalities of Madeira, that were awarded a determined number of member to elect according with the number of registered voters in those constituencies. The method use to elect the members was the D'Hondt method. In this election the number of MPs to be elected rose from 57 in 1992 to 59.

Constituency	Total MPs	Registered voters
Calheta	3	10,423
Câmara de Lobos	6	22,321
Funchal	28	96,899
Machico	5	18,451
Ponta do Sol	2	7,035
Porto Moniz	1	3,116
Porto Santo	1	3,824
Ribeira Brava	3	11,147
Santa Cruz	6	20,955
Santana	2	8,628
São Vicente	2	6,015
Total	59	208,814

== Political parties ==
A total of 7 political parties presented lists of candidates for the regional elections in Madeira, where 208,486 electors could elect 59 deputies to the Legislative Assembly. Of these parties, some of the more prominent:

- Democratic Party of the Atlantic (PDA).
- Democratic Unity Coalition (CDU), an alliance of the Greens and Portuguese Communist Party (PCP).
- People's Democratic Union (UDP).
- People's Party (CDS-PP)
- National Solidarity Party (PSN)
- Socialist Party (PS), leader Emanuel Fernandes.
- Social Democratic Party (PSD), leader Alberto João Jardim.

== Results ==
=== Summary of votes and seats ===
Summary of the 13 October 1996 Legislative Assembly of Madeira elections results
Graph of the party split among 59 seats.
Parties	Votes	%	±pp swing	MPs				
Parties	Votes	%	±pp swing	1992	1996	±	%	±
Social Democratic	77,365	56.87	▲0.0	39	41	▲2	69.49	▲1.1
Socialist	33,790	24.84	▲2.3	12	13	▲1	22.03	▲0.9
People's	9,950	7.31	▼0.8	2	2	0	3.39	▼0.1
Democratic Unity Coalition	5,495	4.04	▲1.0	1	2	▲1	3.39	▲1.6
People's Democratic Union	5,485	4.03	▼0.6	2	1	▼1	1.69	▼1.8
National Solidarity	875	0.64	▼1.8	1	0	▼1	0.00	▼1.8
Democratic Party of the Atlantic	565	0.42	▼0.2	0	0	0	0.00	0.0
Total valid	133,525	98.14	▲0.1	57	59	▲2	100.00	0.0
Blank ballots	991	0.73	▲0.0					
Invalid ballots	1,534	1.13	▼0.2					
Total	136,050	100.00						
Registered voters/turnout	208,486	65.26	▼1.2					
Source: Comissão Nacional de Eleições Archived 2012-04-26 at the Wayback Machine

Vote share
PSD	56.87%
PS	24.84%
CDS-PP	7.31%
CDU	4.04%
UDP	4.03%
PSN	0.64%
PDA	0.42%
Blank/Invalid	1.86%

Parliamentary seats
PSD	69.49%
PS	22.03%
CDS-PP	3.39%
CDU	3.39%
UDP	1.69%

=== Distribution by constituency ===
Results of the 1996 election of the Legislative Assembly of Madeira by constituency
Constituency	%	S	%	S	%	S	%	S	%	S	Total S
Constituency	PSD		PS		CDS-PP		CDU		UDP		Total S
Calheta	69.9	3	6.4	-	20.9	-	0.5	-	0.8	-	3
Câmara de Lobos	69.8	5	12.7	1	6.3	-	5.7	-	3.2	-	6
Funchal	49.5	15	27.2	8	7.4	2	6.5	2	5.9	1	28
Machico	55.4	3	36.6	2	2.7	-	1.1	-	2.6	-	5
Ponta do Sol	67.6	2	16.0	-	11.3	-	0.6	-	2.7	-	2
Porto Moniz	64.3	1	27.8	-	4.6	-	0.3	-	0.5	-	1
Porto Santo	56.6	1	37.2	-	3.1	-	0.4	-	0.5	-	1
Ribeira Brava	68.9	3	19.8	-	5.4	-	0.9	-	2.4	-	3
Santa Cruz	56.1	4	28.4	2	6.9	-	2.0	-	3.7	-	6
Santana	65.2	2	25.6	-	3.7	-	0.8	-	1.6	-	2
São Vicente	61.2	2	24.1	-	10.0	-	0.6	-	1.3	-	2
Total	56.9	41	24.8	13	7.3	2	4.0	2	4.0	1	59
Source: Comissão Nacional de Eleições Archived 2021-12-19 at the Wayback Machine

=== Maps ===
Most voted political force by municipality.

== See also ==
- 1996 Azores regional election
