= Manuel Sérgio =

Portuguese philosopher and academic (1933–2025)

Manuel Sérgio ComIP

Personal details
- Born: Manuel Sérgio Vieira e Cunha; 20 April 1933 Lisbon, Portugal
- Died: 19 February 2025 (aged 91)
- Party: National Solidarity Party (1990–1994)
- Spouse: Maria Helena Cabrita e Cunha

Manuel Sérgio Vieira e Cunha (20 April 1933 – 19 February 2025) was a Portuguese philosopher of sport, academic, activist and politician, specializing in the field of human kinetics.

In the 1990s, Manuel Sérgio was involved in Portuguese politics. He was the first president of the National Solidarity Party, and was elected to the Assembly of the Republic following the 1991 legislative elections, where he stayed for only one legislature until 1995.

Sérgio died on 19 February 2025, at the age of 91.
