= President of the Regional Government of Madeira =

Heads of government of Madeira, Portugal

- Presidente do Governo Regional da Madeira
- Coat of arms of Madeira

- Flag of Madeira

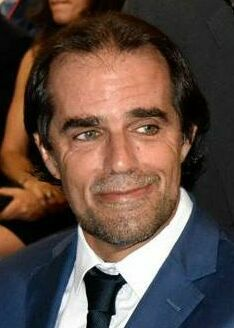
- Incumbent; Miguel Albuquerque since 20 April 2015
- Regional Government of Madeira
- Style: His/Her Excellency
- Residence: Quinta Vigia, Funchal
- Appointer: Representative of the Republic
- Term length: 4 years, no term limit
- Inaugural holder: Jaime Ornelas Camacho
- Formation: 1 October 1976
- Website: Official website

The President of the Regional Government of Madeira is the head of the devolved government of the Madeira archipelago, since the Carnation Revolution that established the current democratic regime in Portugal and granted political autonomy to the Portuguese islands.

Following the 1974 Revolution, provisional governing bodies were created, whose presiding officers are listed below. After the first elections for the Regional Parliament, held on 27 June 1976, the leader of the largest party Jaime Ornelas Camacho was appointed President of the Regional Government.

There have only been three officeholders and all of them were members of the Social Democratic Party. Alberto João Jardim held the office for 37 consecutive years. The current President is Miguel Albuquerque.

== List of officeholders ==
Alberto João Jardim served for ten consecutive terms. Carlos Manuel de Azeredo and Joaquim Miguel Duarte Silva served as presidents of the Regional Junta, the provisional government that functioned during the transition towards democracy.

The current President of the Regional Government of Madeira is Miguel Albuquerque, whose party won the 2015 regional election, and then re-elected in the 2019, 2023, 2024 and 2025 regional elections.

The colors indicate the political affiliation of each President.

Independent
Social Democratic

| Portrait | President (Lifespan) | Term of office | | | Election | Party | Government |
| Portrait | President (Lifespan) | Start | End | Duration | Election | Party | Government |
Presidents appointed in the aftermath of the Carnation Revolution (1974–1976)
| | Carlos Manuel de Azeredo (1930–2021) | 20 February 1976 | 20 August 1976 | 152 days | — | Independent | — |
| | Joaquim Miguel Duarte Silva (1924–2007) | 20 August 1976 | 1 October 1976 | 42 days | — | Independent | — |
Presidents elected under the Constitution of the Republic (1976–present)
| | Jaime Ornelas Camacho (1921–2016) | 1 October 1976 | 17 March 1978 | 1 year, 198 days | 1976 | Social Democratic | I |
| | Alberto João Jardim (born 1943) | 17 March 1978 | 20 April 2015 | 37 years, 34 days | — | Social Democratic | II |
| | Alberto João Jardim (born 1943) | 17 March 1978 | 20 April 2015 | 37 years, 34 days | 1980 | Social Democratic | III |
| | Alberto João Jardim (born 1943) | 17 March 1978 | 20 April 2015 | 37 years, 34 days | 1984 | Social Democratic | IV |
| | Alberto João Jardim (born 1943) | 17 March 1978 | 20 April 2015 | 37 years, 34 days | 1988 | Social Democratic | V |
| | Alberto João Jardim (born 1943) | 17 March 1978 | 20 April 2015 | 37 years, 34 days | 1992 | Social Democratic | VI |
| | Alberto João Jardim (born 1943) | 17 March 1978 | 20 April 2015 | 37 years, 34 days | 1996 | Social Democratic | VII |
| | Alberto João Jardim (born 1943) | 17 March 1978 | 20 April 2015 | 37 years, 34 days | 2000 | Social Democratic | VIII |
| | Alberto João Jardim (born 1943) | 17 March 1978 | 20 April 2015 | 37 years, 34 days | 2004 | Social Democratic | IX |
| | Alberto João Jardim (born 1943) | 17 March 1978 | 20 April 2015 | 37 years, 34 days | 2007 | Social Democratic | X |
| | Alberto João Jardim (born 1943) | 17 March 1978 | 20 April 2015 | 37 years, 34 days | 2011 | Social Democratic | XI |
| | Miguel Albuquerque (born 1961) | 20 April 2015 | Incumbent | 11 years, 183 days | 2015 | Social Democratic | XII |
| | Miguel Albuquerque (born 1961) | 20 April 2015 | Incumbent | 11 years, 183 days | 2019 | Social Democratic | XIV |
| | Miguel Albuquerque (born 1961) | 20 April 2015 | Incumbent | 11 years, 183 days | 2023 | Social Democratic | XV (Note: Coalition government PSD-CDS–PP; Confidence & supply gov't: PSD/CDS-PP ⇐ (PAN).) |
| | Miguel Albuquerque (born 1961) | 20 April 2015 | Incumbent | 11 years, 183 days | 2024 | Social Democratic | XVI (Note: Minority government PSD; Confidence & supply gov't: PSD ⇐ (CDS–PP).) |
| | Miguel Albuquerque (born 1961) | 20 April 2015 | Incumbent | 11 years, 183 days | 2025 | Social Democratic | XVI |

== See also ==
- President of the Regional Government of the Azores
- Regional Government of Madeira
