= Jaime Ornelas Camacho =

Portuguese politician

His Excellency Jaime Ornelas Camacho GOIH ComM

1st President of the Regional Government of Madeira
- In office 1 October 1976 – 17 March 1978
- Preceded by: Joaquim Miguel Duarte Silva (as Military Governor of Madeira)
- Succeeded by: Alberto João Jardim

Personal details
- Born: 28 February 1921; Curral das Freiras, Madeira Island, Portugal
- Died: 24 February 2016 (aged 94); Funchal, Madeira, Portugal
- Political party: PSD of Madeira
- Spouse: Iolanda Camacho
- Parents: Jordão Joaquim de Ornelas (father); Bela Dória Camacho (mother)
- Occupation: Politician
- Profession: Engineer

Jaime Ornelas Camacho (28 February 1921 – 24 February 2016) was a Portuguese politician. He was the first President of the Regional Government of Madeira and a member of the Madeiran branch of the centre-right Social Democratic Party. In 1978 he was forced out of office and succeeded by Alberto João Jardim, who remained President of the Regional Government of Madeira until 2015.

== National Orders ==
- Commander of the Order of Merit (9 June 1993)
- Grand Cross of the Order of Prince Henry (28 June 2001)

Political offices
| Preceded by New title | President of the Regional Government of Madeira; 1976 – 1978 | Succeeded by Alberto João Jardim |
