= Together for the People =

Regionalist political party in Portugal

Together for the People Juntos pelo Povo
- Abbreviation: JPP
- President: Lina Pereira
- Secretary-General: Élvio Sousa
- Founder: Filipe Sousa
- Legalized: 3 May 2008 (as Movement For the People of Gaula); 27 January 2015 (as a party)
- Headquarters: Estrada Padre Alfredo Vieira de Freitas, 164B 9100-079 Gaula, Santa Cruz, Madeira
- Youth wing: Juventude do Juntos Pelo Povo
- Ideology: Madeiran regionalism; Social liberalism
- Political position: Centre to centre-left
- European affiliation: European Democratic Party
- Colours: Teal
- Assembly of the Republic: 1 / 230
- European Parliament: 0 / 21
- Assembly of Madeira: 11 / 47
- Local government (Mayors): 1 / 308
- Local government (Parishes): 5 / 3,216

Election symbol
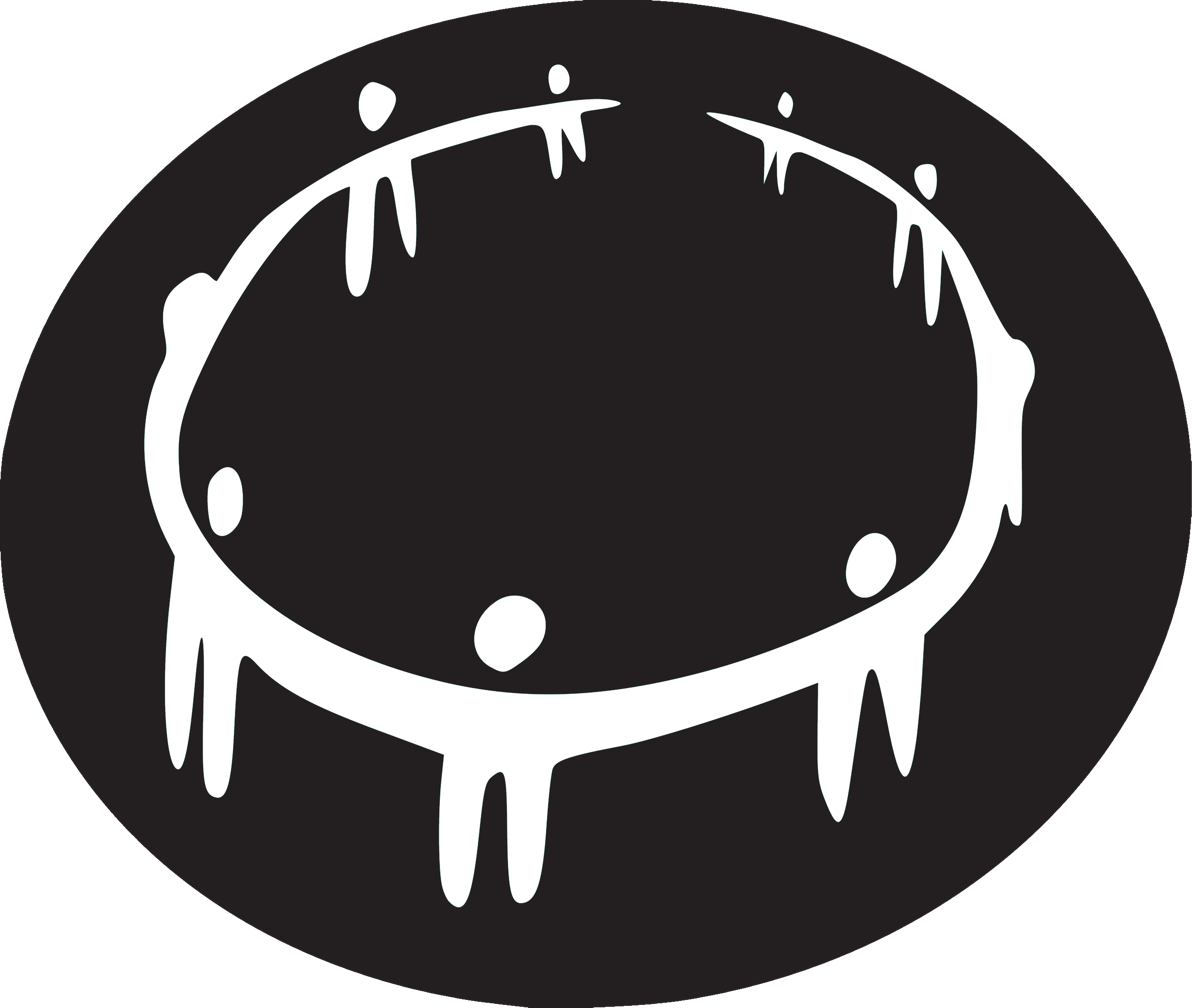

Website
- juntospelopovo.pt

Together for the People (Portuguese: Juntos pelo Povo, JPP) is a political party operating primarily in Madeira. Its founding principles are Unity, Transparency and Resistance, as evidenced by its symbol. It was legalised by the Portuguese Constitutional Court on 27 January 2015.

== History ==
It started in the parish of Santa Cruz, Madeira as an independent movement where it won the 2013 local elections with an absolute majority with Filipe Sousa as head.

After the victory, it was decided to turn the movement into a political party, in March 2014, having submitted over 10 thousand signatures (more than the 7,500 required by law) to the Constitutional Court in November 2014.

It was formed in order to run in the 2015 Madeiran regional elections, because the Portuguese Constitution does not allow for the candidacy of independents to the country's legislative organs or the existence of regional parties, making the JPP available to run in any election in the country if it so chooses, although it currently only runs candidates in Madeira. It won five seats in the 2015 Madeiran regional election with 10.34% of the votes, a total of 13,229 votes.

In the 2019 Madeiran regional election, JPP lost about half of the votes from the previous election, losing 2 seats. In the 2022 legislative election, JPP managed to come third in Madeira, with 6.9% of the votes, but failed to elect any deputy to the Assembly of the Republic.

In 2023, JPP had their best result in any Madeiran regional election, achieving 11% of the votes and recovering the 2 seats lost in 2019.

In the preparations for the 2024 Azorean regional election, JPP presented a candidate for the first time in the Azores, Carlos Furtado, a former regional deputy from Chega that left the party, hoping to expand the party's influence.

In January 2024, JPP's founder and president Filipe Sousa resigned from the presidency and was replaced by Lina Pereira in order to run for Parliament in the 2024 legislative election, in which he failed to be elected. Shortly after, in May 2024, the party climbed to 16.9% and elected 9 seats to the Madeiran assembly. Since the PSD and the CDS failed to gain a majority, JPP proposed a coalition with the Socialist Party (PS) in order to form a government, which didn't happen after the PSD secured the abstention of Chega.

In March 2025, the party won 21.1% of the votes and 11 seats, surpassing PS and became the second largest party in the Madeiran assembly, with Élvio Sousa becoming the leader of the opposition. In the May 2025 legislative election, Filipe Sousa was elected as a member of the Assembly of the Republic after winning 12.3% of the votes in Madeira, this being the first time the party entered the national parliament.

In January 2026, JPP established a partnership with Volt Portugal after a meeting between Filipe Sousa and Volt Europa MEPs.

== Election results ==
=== Assembly of the Republic ===
Election	Leader	Votes	%	Seats	+/-	Government
2015	Élvio Sousa	14,275	0.3 (#15)	0 / 230	New	No seats
2019	Élvio Sousa	10,552	0.2 (#18)	0 / 230	0	No seats
2022	Élvio Sousa	10,786	0.2 (#15)	0 / 230	0	No seats
2024	Élvio Sousa	19,145	0.3 (#11)	0 / 230	0	No seats
2025	Élvio Sousa	20,900	0.3 (#10)	1 / 230	▲1	Opposition

=== Regional Assemblies ===
Madeira Regional Parliament

Election	Leader	Votes	%	Seats	+/-	Government
2015	Élvio Sousa	13,114	10.3 (#4)	5 / 47	New	Opposition
2019	Élvio Sousa	7,830	5.5 (#4)	3 / 47	▼2	Opposition
2023	Élvio Sousa	14,933	11.0 (#3)	5 / 47	▲2	Opposition
2024	Élvio Sousa	22,958	16.9 (#3)	9 / 47	▲4	Opposition
2025	Élvio Sousa	30,091	21.1 (#2)	11 / 47	▲2	Opposition

==== Azores Regional Assembly ====
Election	Leader	Votes	%	Seats	+/-	Government
2024	Carlos Furtado	626	0.5 (#9)	0 / 57	New	No seats

=== Local elections ===
Election	Leader	Votes	%	Mayors	+/-	Councillors	+/-	Assemblies	+/-	Parishes	+/-	Parish Assemblies	+/-
2017	Filipe Sousa	14,818	0.3 (#18)	1 / 308	New	6 / 2,074	New	17 / 6,461	New	5 / 3,092	New	45 / 27,005	New
2021	Filipe Sousa	14,073	0.3 (#25)	1 / 308	0	5 / 2,064	▼1	13 / 6,448	▼4	5 / 3,066	0	43 / 26,797	▼2
2025	Élvio Sousa	26,884	0.5 (#17)	1 / 308	0	8 / 2,058	▲3	29 / 6,463	▲16	5 / 3,216	0	69 / 27,973	▲26
