= 2019 Madeiran regional election =

Portuguese regional election

- 22 September 2019

47 seats to the Legislative Assembly of Madeira 24 seats needed for a majority
- Opinion polls
- Turnout: 55.5% ▲5.8 pp
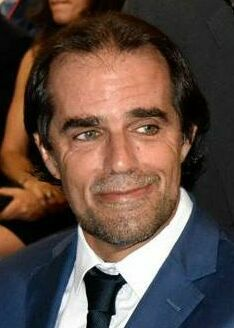

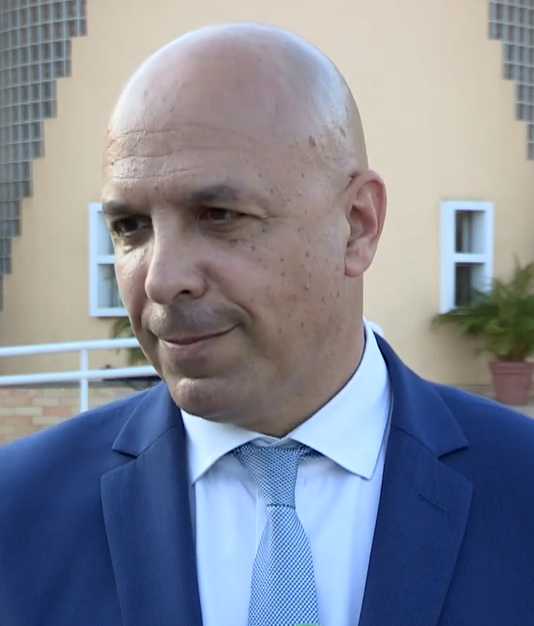

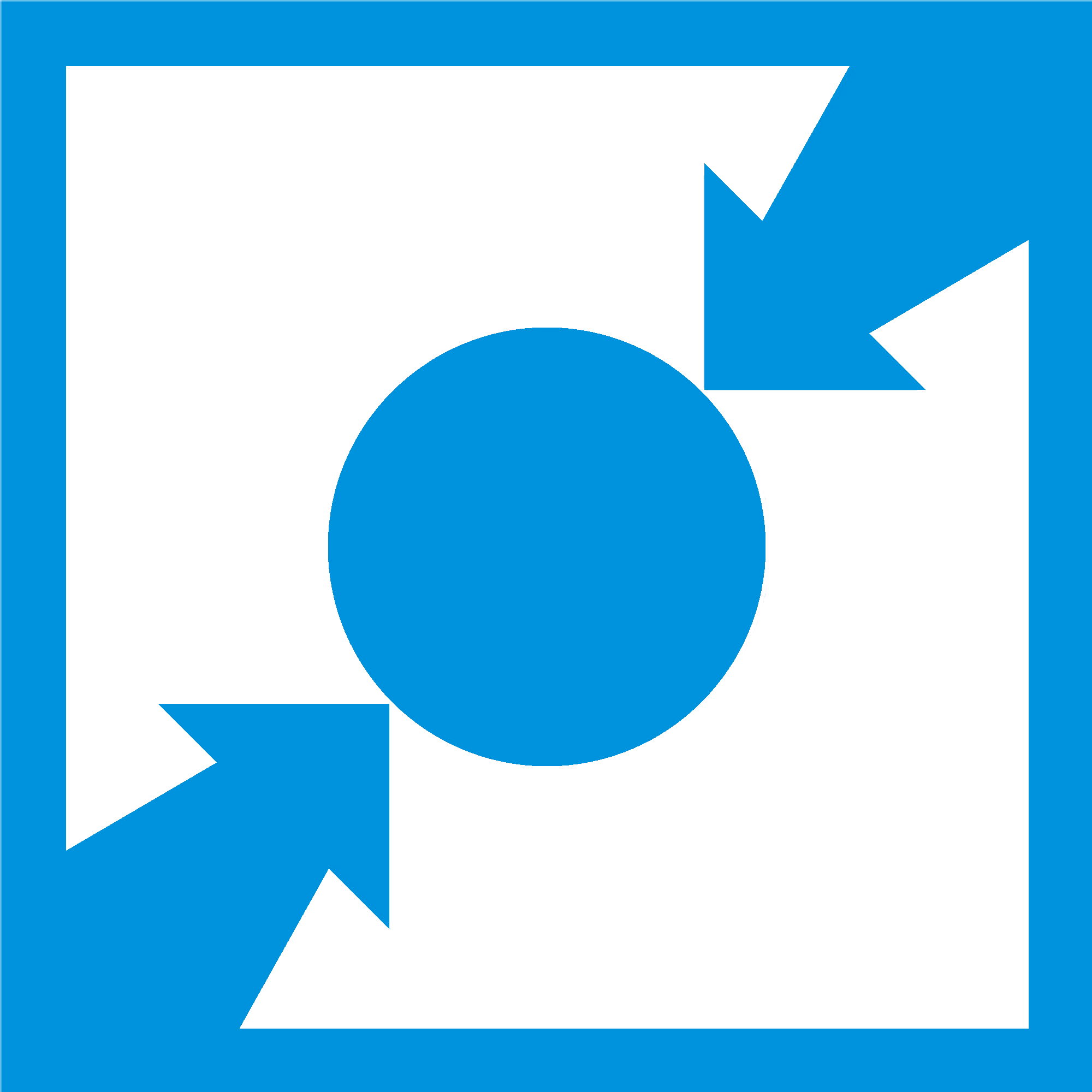

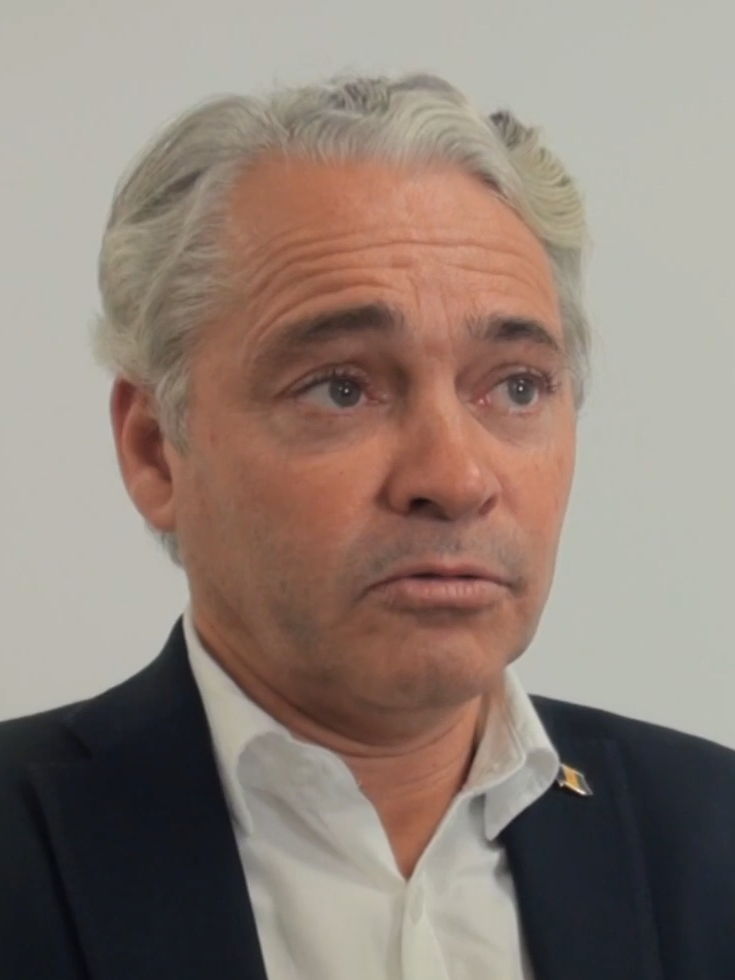

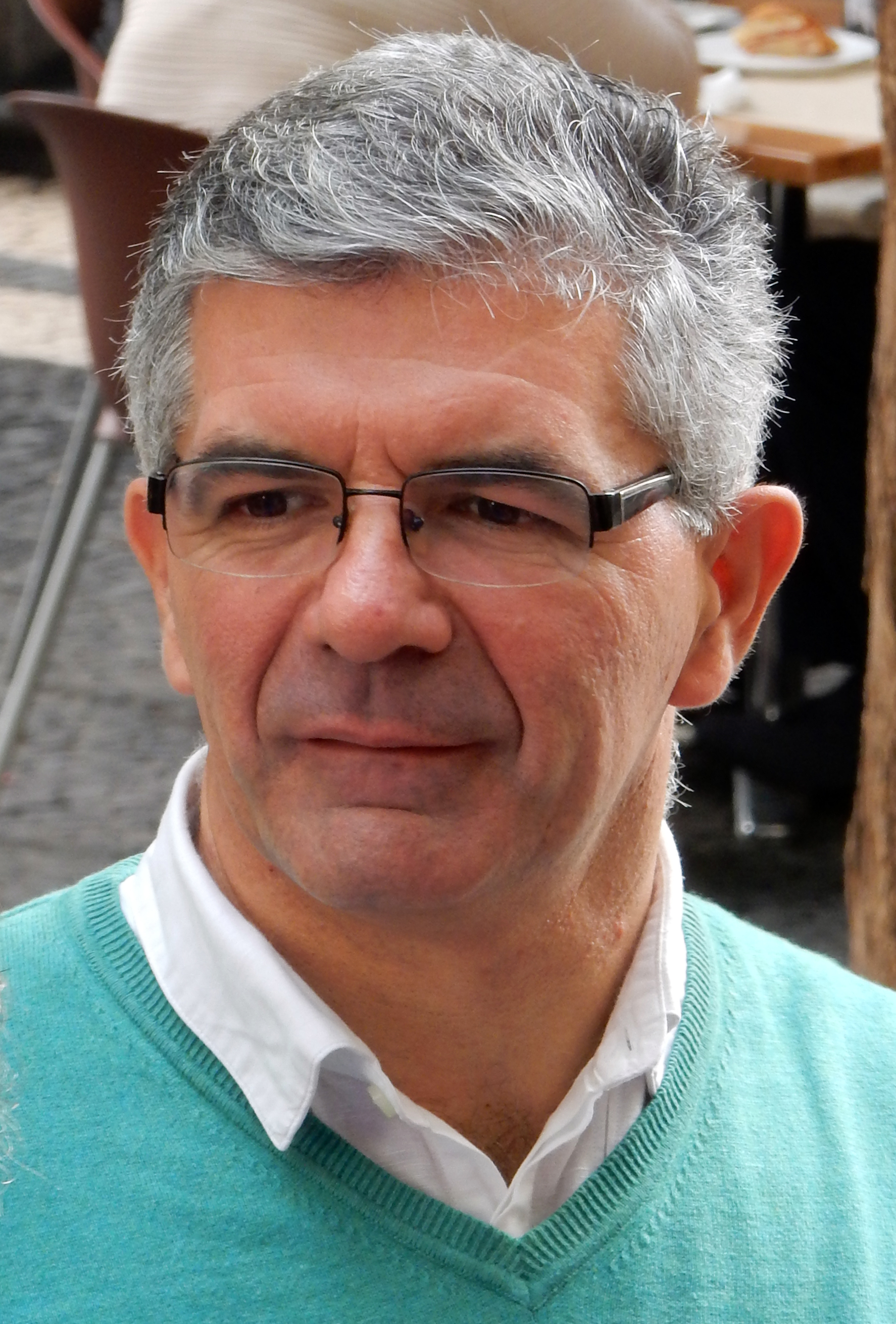

	First party	Second party	Third party
Leader	Miguel Albuquerque	Paulo Cafôfo (Note: The leader of the PS-Madeira is Emanuel Câmara, but he has nominated the mayor of Funchal, Paulo Cafôfo, as the PS candidate for the Presidency of the Madeira Government.)	Rui Barreto
Party	PSD	PS	CDS–PP
Leader since	10 January 2015	19 January 2018 (designated candidate)	22 July 2018
Last election	24 seats, 44.4%	5 seats (CM) (Note: PS, PTP, PAN and MPT contested the 2015 election in an electoral coalition called Change which received 11.4% of the vote.)	7 seats, 13.1%
Seats won	21	19	3
Seat change	▼3	▲14	▼4
Popular vote	56,449	51,207	8,246
Percentage	39.4%	35.8%	5.8%
Swing	▼4.9 pp		▼7.9 pp
	Fourth party	Fifth party	Sixth party
Leader	Élvio Sousa	Edgar Silva	Paulino Ascensão
Party	JPP	CDU	BE
Leader since	27 January 2015	1996	4 March 2018
Last election	5 seats, 10.3%	2 seats, 5.5%	2 seats, 3.8%
Seats won	3	1	0
Seat change	▼2	▼1	▼2
Popular vote	7,830	2,577	2,489
Percentage	5.5%	1.8%	1.7%
Swing	▼4.8 pp	▼3.7 pp	▼2.1 pp
- The most voted party by municipality.
President before election
Miguel Albuquerque
PSD
Elected President
Miguel Albuquerque
PSD

Regional elections were held on 22 September 2019 to determine the composition of the Legislative Assembly of the Autonomous Region of Madeira in Portugal. All 47 members of the Assembly were up for election.

The Social Democratic Party continued their 43-year streak of being the largest party in the Madeiran legislature, but failed to hold on to their absolute majority, and would require a coalition for the first time to remain in power. The party won 39 percent of the votes, a decrease of 5 percentage points, and lost 3 members of the regional party. In the electoral map, the PSD lost the two biggest cities in Madeira, Funchal and Santa Cruz to the PS, although by less than 2 percent of the vote. Overall, the PSD still won the majority of municipalities, obtaining victory in 7 of the 11 in Madeira.

The Socialist Party surged in these elections, polling just two seats and 3.6 points behind the PSD. It was the best showing of the PS in a regional election in Madeira going back to the first regional elections in 1976, two years after the fall of the dictatorship. The party won 4 of the 11 municipalities in Madeira. The People's Party lost a lot of votes and seats in these elections, winning just 3 seats and 5.8 percent of the vote. Together for the People (JPP) also suffered a big setback by losing 2 members and almost 5 percent of the votes. It even failed to obtain second place in their traditional bastion of Santa Cruz, falling behind the PS and PSD. The Unitary Democratic Coalition lost 1 of their 2 seats, and lost 3.7 percent of votes compared to 2015. The Left Bloc was wiped from the regional Assembly completely and only won 1.7 percent of the votes. These elections were fought mainly between the PSD and PS, and many left-wing voters opted to vote tactically for the PS to prevent another PSD victory, but by doing so, they hurt the chances of smaller left-wing parties and alliances such as the Left Bloc and CDU.

The turnout in these elections increased compared to the previous one for the first time in over a decade, with 55.5 percent of voters casting a ballot, compared with the record-low 49.6 percent in the 2015 elections.

Following the elections, PSD and CDS-PP formed a coalition government with a parliamentary majority, headed by Miguel Albuquerque.

== Background ==
=== Leadership changes and challenges ===
==== Socialist Party ====
After the party's dismal result in the 2015 regional election, just 11 percent of the votes, the then PS leader, Victor Freitas resigned and a leadership ballot was called. Carlos João Pereira was the sole candidate for the leadership and was elected with 70% of the votes. However, Pereira's leadership divided the party, as he spent much more time in the Assembly of the Republic, in Lisbon, rather than in Madeira. A leadership ballot was called for 19 January 2018 and two candidates were on the ballot: Incumbent leader Carlos Pereira and Porto Moniz mayor, Emanuel Câmara. Câmara defeated Pereira by a 57 to 43 percent margin. The results were the following:

Ballot: 19 January 2018
Candidate	Votes	%
Emanuel Câmara	877	56.8
Carlos João Pereira	668	43.2
Turnout	1,545	79.15

Despite being elected leader, Emanuel Câmara announced that he would not be the party's candidate for the Presidency of the Regional Government and that he would pick Funchal mayor Paulo Cafôfo as the party's lead candidate.

== Electoral system ==
The current 47 members of the Madeiran regional parliament are elected in a single constituency by proportional representation under the D'Hondt method, coinciding with the territory of the Region.

== Parties ==
=== Current composition ===
The table below lists parties represented in the Legislative Assembly of Madeira before the election.

Name		Ideology	Leader	2015 result	
Name		Ideology	Leader	%	Seats
PPD/PSD	Social Democratic Party; Partido Social Democrata	Liberal conservatism	Miguel Albuquerque	44.4%	24 / 47
CDS–PP	CDS – People's Party; Centro Democrático Social – Partido Popular	Conservatism	Rui Barreto	13.1%	7 / 47
PS	Socialist Party; Partido Socialista	Social democracy	Emanuel Câmara; Paulo Cafôfo	11.4%	5 / 47
PTP	Portuguese Labour Party; Partido Trabalhista Português	Social democracy	Quintino Costa	11.4%	1 / 47
JPP	Together for the People; Juntos pelo Povo	Social liberalism	Élvio Sousa	10.3%	5 / 47
PCP	Portuguese Communist Party; Partido Comunista Português	Communism	Edgar Silva	5.5% (Note: The Portuguese Communist Party (PCP) and the Ecologist Party "The Greens" (PEV) contested the 2015 election jointly as the Unitary Democratic Coalition, and won a combined 5.5% of the vote and elected 2 MPs to parliament.)	2 / 47
B.E.	Left Bloc; Bloco de Esquerda	Democratic socialism	Paulino Ascenção	3.8%	2 / 47
Ind.	Independent; Independente	Gil Canha (elected for the now extinct PND)			1 / 47

=== Parties running in the election ===
17 parties were on the ballot for the 2019 Madeira regional election. The parties that contested the election and their lead candidates were: (parties/coalitions are ordered by the way they appeared on the ballot)

- Democratic Republican Party (PDR), Filipe Rebelo
- Enough (CH), Miguel Teixeira
- National Renovator Party (PNR), Álvaro Araújo
- Left Bloc (BE), Paulino Ascenção
- Socialist Party (PS), Paulo Cafôfo
- People-Animals-Nature (PAN), João Henrique de Freitas
- Alliance (A), Joaquim Sousa
- Earth Party (MPT), Valter Rodrigues
- Portuguese Workers' Communist Party (PCTP/MRPP), Fernanda Calaça
- Social Democratic Party (PSD), Miguel Albuquerque
- Liberal Initiative (IL), Nuno Morna
- Portuguese Labour Party (PTP), Raquel Coelho
- United Party of Retirees and Pensioners (PURP), Rafael Macedo
- CDS – People's Party (CDS-PP), Rui Barreto
- Unitary Democratic Coalition (CDU), Edgar Silva
- Together for the People (JPP), Élvio Sousa
- React, Include, Recycle (RIR), Roberto Vieira (Note: Roberto Vieira is a former Earth Party (MPT) member.)

== Campaign period ==
=== Party slogans ===
Party or alliance	Original slogan	English translation	Refs
PSD	« Cumprir no rumo certo »	"Delivering on the right track"	
CDS–PP	« Este é o momento »	"This is the moment"	
PS	« Coragem para mudar »	"Courage to change"	
JPP	« Dar voz aos Madeirenses »	"Giving voice to Madeirans"	
BE	« A Madeira para todos »	"Madeira for all"	
CDU	« CDU, o voto que conta »	"CDU, the vote that counts"	

=== Candidates' debates ===
2019 Madeiran regional election debates
Date	Organisers	Moderator(s)	I Invitee P Present A Absent invitee N Non-invitee						
Date	Organisers	Moderator(s)	PSD Albuquerque	PS Cafôfo	CDS–PP Barreto	BE Ascenção	CDU Silva	JPP Sousa	Refs
19 Sep	RTP Madeira, RTP3	Gil Rosa	P	P	P	P	P	P	

== Opinion polls ==
=== Graphical summary ===
View source data.

=== Polling ===
Exit poll

Polling firm/Link	Fieldwork date	Sample size	Turnout	PSD	CDS–PP	PS		CDU	BE	PTP	PAN	MPT	A	O	Lead
2019 regional election	22 Sep 2019	—N/a	55.5%	39.4; 21	5.8; 3	35.8; 19	5.5; 3	1.8; 1	1.7; 0	1.0; 0	1.5; 0	0.4; 0	0.5; 0	6.6; 0	3.6
UCP–CESOP	22 Sep 2019	6,000	?	37–41; 19/23	5–7; 2/3	34–38; 17/21	3–5; 1/2	1–3; 0/1	1–3; 0/1	-	1–2; 0/1	-	-	-	3
Eurosondagem	15–17 Sep 2019	1,525	?	36.0; 19	8.0; 4	33.6; 17/18	2.5; 1	4.5; 2	4.0; 2	0.7; 0	? 0/1	-	? 0/1	10.7; 0/1	2.4
Intercampus	2–16 Sep 2019	1,503	?	39.0; 21	9.3; 5	33.1; 17	3.4; 1	3.9; 2	2.2; 1	-	-	-	-	9.1; 0	5.9
UCP–CESOP	14–15 Sep 2019	1,375	?	38; 19/23	5; 2/3	29; 14/18	4; 2/3	3; 1/2	5; 2/3	-	2; 1	1.5; 0/1	1.5; 0/1	11; 0	9
Eurosondagem	21–24 Jul 2019	1,519	?	33.3; 18/19	7.1; 3/4	31.9; 17/18	4.2; 2	4.0; 2	6.9; 3/4	0.5; 0	-	-	-	12.0; 0/1	1.4
2019 EP elections	26 May 2019	—N/a	38.5	37.2 (22)	8.1 (4)	25.8 (15)	—N/a	3.0 (1)	5.3 (3)	1.3 (0)	3.7 (2)	—N/a	1.6 (0)	14.0 (0)	11.4
CDS-PP internal	8 Feb 2019	?	?	36.0; 19/20	8.0; 4/5	33.0; 18/19	4.0; 2	3.0; 1	3.0; 1	2.0; 0/1	-	-	-	11.0; 0	3.0
Eurosondagem	14–17 Jan 2019	1,510	?	34.7; 18/19	8.0; 4	36.9; 19/20	4.8; 2	3.6; 1/2	4.0; 2	0.9; 0	-	-	-	7.1; 0	2.2
Eurosondagem	26–28 Nov 2018	748	?	34.2; 18	10.6; 5	33.9; 18	6.5; 3	3.4; 1	4.0; 2	1.6; 0	-	-	-	5.8; 0	0.3
Intercampus	21–26 Nov 2018	400	?	? 19	? 2	? 23	? 2	? 1	? 0	? 0	? 0	? 0	? 0	? 0	?
Eurosondagem	19–24 Jul 2018	1,018	?	36.3; 18/19	7.1; 3/4	35.7; 18/19	6.0; 3	4.8; 2	3.9; 2	1.2; 0	-	-	(Note: Did not exist.)	5.0; 0	0.6
Eurosondagem	5–7 Feb 2018	1,018	?	38.5; 20/21	5.9; 3	33.2; 17/18	6.8; 3	3.1; 1	4.9; 2	1.4; 0	-	-	(Note: Did not exist.)	6.2; 0	5.3
Eurosondagem	22–24 Oct 2017	1,017	?	36.3; 19	6.0; 3	33.6; 17	6.5; 3	4.5; 2	4.1; 2	2.1; 1	-	-	(Note: Did not exist.)	6.9; 0	2.7
2017 local elections	1 Oct 2017	—N/a	54.2	33.6 (19)	9.1 (5)	29.1 (16)	10.2 (5)	2.4 (1)	0.7 (0)	1.7 (1)	—N/a	0.6 (0)	(Note: Did not exist.)	12.6 (0)	4.5
Eurosondagem	7–9 Jun 2017	1,010	?	40.4; 21/22	5.4; 2/3	30.0; 15/16	4.7; 2	4.9; 2	5.9; 2	1.9; 2	-	-	(Note: Did not exist.)	6.8; 0	10.4
Eurosondagem	14–16 Mar 2017	1,017	?	38.0; 20/21	8.6; 4	27.2; 14/15	4.1; 2	5.0; 2/3	6.93	1.3 –	-	-	(Note: Did not exist.)	8.90	10.8
2015 legislative election	4 Oct 2015	—N/a	48.9	37.8 (21)	6.0 (3)	20.9 (11)	6.9 (3)	3.6 (2)	10.7 (6)	1.4 (0)	1.8 (1)	1.4 (0)	(Note: Did not exist.)	13.5 (0)	16.9
2015 regional election	29 Mar 2015	—N/a	49.6	44.4; 24	13.7; 7	11.4; 5	10.3; 5	5.5; 2	3.8; 2	1	0	0	(Note: Did not exist.)	10.9; 1	30.7

== Voter turnout ==
The table below shows voter turnout throughout election day.

Turnout	Time								
Turnout	12:00			16:00			19:00		
Turnout	2015	2019	±	2015	2019	±	2015	2019	±
Total	17.21%	20.97%	▲3.76 pp	37.48%	40.79%	▲3.31 pp	49.58%	55.50%	▲5.92 pp

== Results ==
On election night, the centre-right PSD and national-conservative CDS said they were willing to form a coalition government.

Summary of the 22 September 2019 Legislative Assembly of Madeira elections results
Parties	Votes	%	±pp swing	MPs				
Parties	Votes	%	±pp swing	2015	2019	±	%	±
Social Democratic	56,449	39.42	▼4.9	24	21	▼3	44.68	▼6.4
Socialist	51,207	35.76		5	19	▲14	40.43	▲29.8
People's	8,246	5.76	▼8.0	7	3	▼4	6.38	▼8.5
Together for the People	7,830	5.47	▼4.8	5	3	▼2	6.38	▼4.3
Unitary Democratic Coalition	2,577	1.80	▼3.7	2	1	▼1	2.13	▼2.1
Left Bloc	2,489	1.74	▼2.1	2	0	▼2	0.00	▼4.2
People-Animals-Nature	2,095	1.46		0	0	0	0.00	0.0
United Party of Retirees and Pensioners	1,766	1.23	—N/a	—N/a	0	—N/a	0.00	—N/a
React, Include, Recycle	1,749	1.22	—N/a	—N/a	0	—N/a	0.00	—N/a
Labour	1,426	1.00		1	0	▼1	0.00	▼2.1
Alliance	766	0.53	—N/a	—N/a	0	—N/a	0.00	—N/a
Liberal Initiative	762	0.53	—N/a	—N/a	0	—N/a	0.00	—N/a
Chega	619	0.43	—N/a	—N/a	0	—N/a	0.00	—N/a
Democratic Republican	603	0.42	—N/a	—N/a	0	—N/a	0.00	—N/a
Portuguese Workers' Communist	601	0.42	▼1.3	0	0	0	0.00	0.0
Earth	507	0.35		0	0	0	0.00	0.0
National Renovator	274	0.19	▼0.6	0	0	0	0.00	0.0
Total valid	139,966	97.74	▲2.1	47	47	0	100.00	0.0
Blank ballots	700	0.49	▼0.5					
Invalid ballots	2,534	1.77	▼1.6					
Total	143,200	100.00						
Registered voters/turnout	258,005	55.50	▲5.8					
Source: Comissão Nacional de Eleições

Vote share
PSD	39.42%
PS	35.76%
CDS-PP	5.76%
JPP	5.47%
CDU	1.80%
BE	1.74%
PAN	1.46%
PURP	1.23%
RIR	1.22%
PTP	1.00%
Alliance	0.53%
IL	0.53%
Others	1.81%
Blank/Invalid	2.26%

Parliamentary seats
PSD	44.68%
PS	40.43%
CDS-PP	6.38%
JPP	6.38%
CDU	2.13%

=== Maps ===
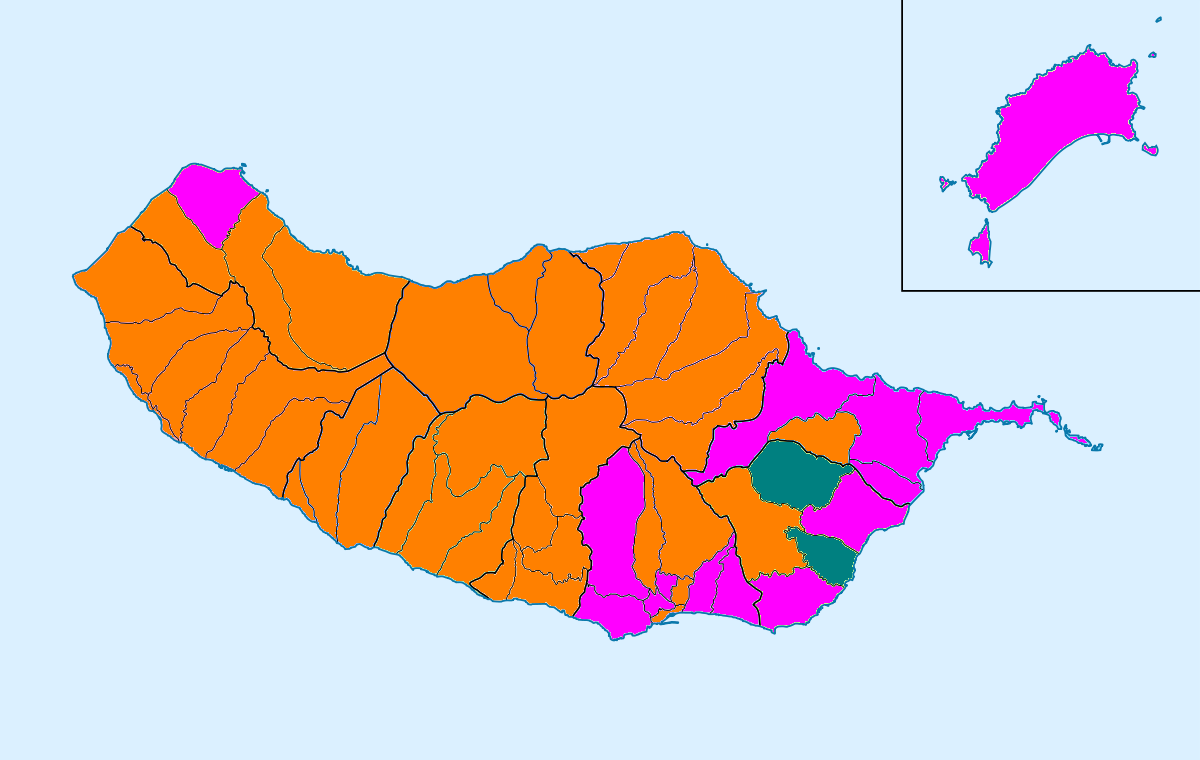
Most voted political force by parish.

== Aftermath ==
=== Government approval ===
For the first time in democracy, the PSD failed to win an outright majority of seats and was forced to negotiate with other parties. Shortly after, the party reached a deal with CDS – People's Party (CDS–PP) to form a coalition government. On 13 November 2019, the regional parliament approved Albuquerque's second led government, the first coalition government in Madeira:

2019 Motion of confidence Miguel Albuquerque (PSD)
Ballot →	13 November 2019
Required majority →	Simple
Yes: • PSD (21); • CDS–PP (3)	24 / 47
No: • PS (19); • JPP (3); • PCP (1)	23 / 47
Abstentions	0 / 47
Absentees	0 / 47
Result →	Approved

== See also ==
- Madeira
