= Gaula (Madeira) =

- Civil parish
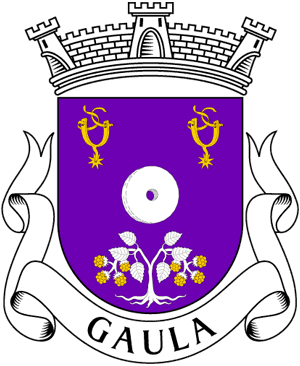
- Coat of arms
- Interactive map of Gaula
- Location in Madeira
- Coordinates: 32°40′20″N 16°48′20″W
- Country: Portugal
- Auton. region: Madeira
- Island: Madeira
- Municipality: Santa Cruz

Area
  - Total: 6.95 km^{2} (2.68 sq mi)

Population (2011)
  - Total: 4,028
  - Density: 580/km^{2} (1,500/sq mi)
- Time zone: UTC+00:00 (WET)
  - Summer (DST): UTC+01:00 (WEST)
- Area code: 291
- Website: www.jfgaula.pt/site/

Gaula is a Portuguese civil parish, in the municipality of Santa Cruz in the island of Madeira. The population in 2011 was 4,028, in an area of 6.95 km^{2}. It is located 7 kilometres (7,000 m) northeast of the island capital of Funchal.

== History ==
Gaula's history is tied to universe of local history, popular culture, literature, traditions and customs; it was originally referred to as the terra do amadis de Gaula (Land of Amadis de Gaula), terra de adelos (Land of the wandering salesmen), terras de doutores (Lands of the Doctors), terra de padres (Land of Priests), terra das amoras (Land of the Blackberries) and terras de malvasias (Land of the Malvasia), among others, that served to identify it from other regions of the island.

Many of these names arose of tradition and legend, when Gaulês were interrogated about the birthplace, they would respond with merry comments, such as I am from Gaula, what do you have with that, or outside the blackberry harvest, I am from Gaul for my sins. The oldest documented references referring to Gaula extend to 1509, when King Manuel I conceded this location the right to construct a small chapel to Santa Maria da Luz. Its toponymy was influenced by chivalrous romances of the medieval era, namely, the historical romanance Amadis de Gaula from the 14th century.

During this era the lands were homes to signeurial families, such as the horseman Lançarote Teixeira de Gaula and Helena de Góis, children of Lançarote Teixeira, who was the son of Tristão Vaz Teixeira, first Captain-donatário of Machico.

The parish included the two ecclesiastical parishes: Nossa Senhora da Luz in the south, and Achada de Gaula, in the a north. From the 15th century, the region that would become known as Gaula, became inhabited by settlers from northern Portugal, Italy, France and Scotland. Gaula was elevated to the status of civil parish in 1558.

== Geography ==
The parish of Gaula consists of the localities Achada de Baixo, Achada de Cima, Achada da Rocha, Aldonça, Beatas, Contenda, Farrobo, Fazenda, Fazendinha, Fonte, Fonte do Lopo, Furtados, Lajes, Levadas, Lobas, Lombadinha, Salão, São João, Pico, Porto Novo and Povo.
