= Alberto João Jardim =

Portuguese politician

His Excellency Alberto João Jardim GCC, GCIH, KNO1kl
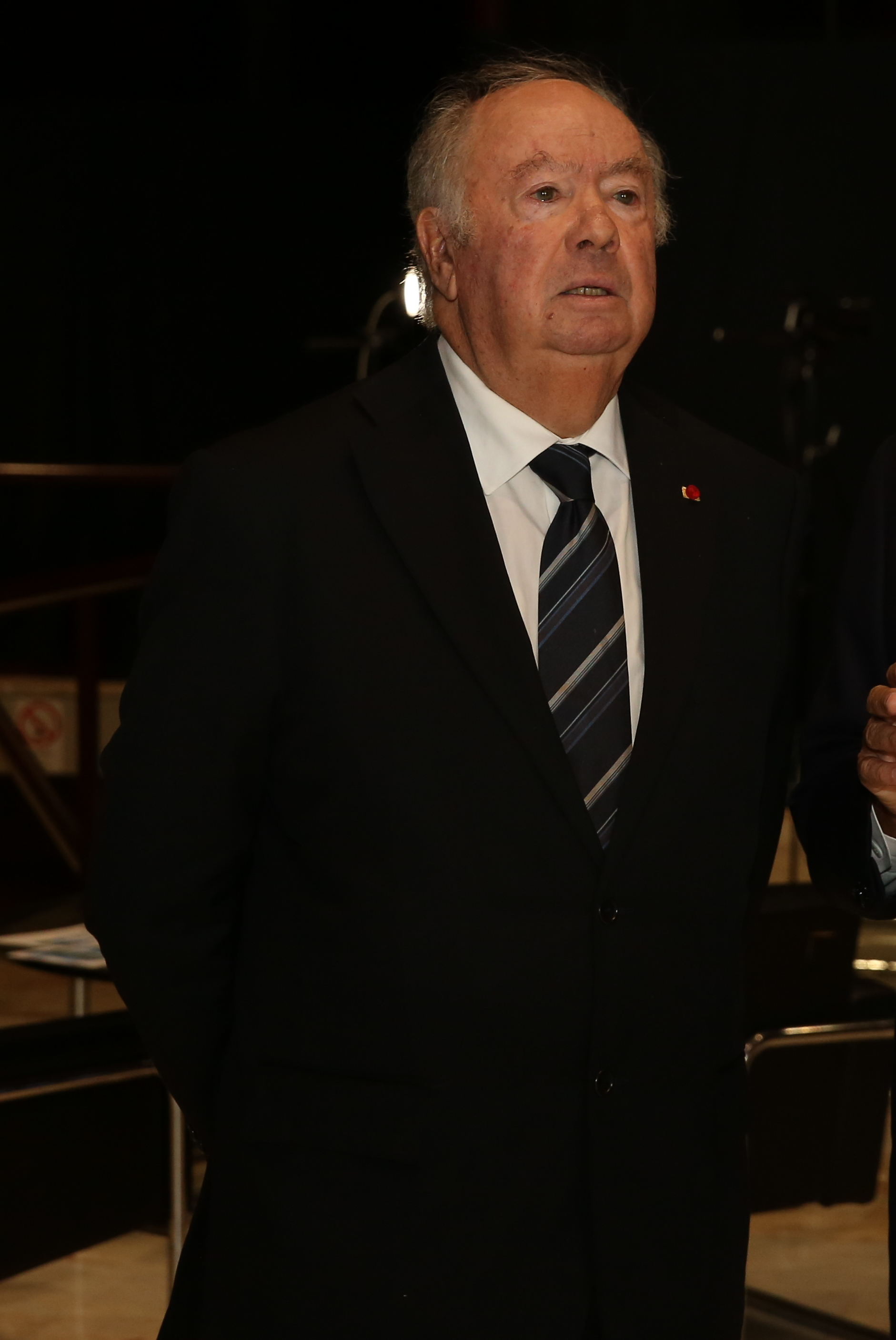
- Alberto João Jardim in 2018

President of the Regional Government of Madeira
- In office 16 March 1978 – 20 April 2015
- Vice President: João Cunha e Silva
- Preceded by: Jaime Ornelas Camacho
- Succeeded by: Miguel Albuquerque

President of the Social Democratic Party of Madeira
- In office 11 July 1977 – 10 January 2015
- Preceded by: Position established
- Succeeded by: Miguel Albuquerque

Member of the Legislative Assembly of Madeira
- In office 19 July 1976 – 16 March 1978

Personal details
- Born: 4 February 1943 (age 83) Funchal, Madeira, Portugal
- Party: Social Democratic Party (1974–present)
- Spouse: Maria Ângela Andrade Martins (m. 1968)
- Children: 3
- Education: University of Coimbra

Alberto João Cardoso Gonçalves Jardim, GCC, GCIH (Portuguese pronunciation: [alˈβɛɾtu ʒuˈɐ̃w ʒɐɾˈðĩ], born 4 February 1943) is a Portuguese politician who was the President of the Regional Government of Madeira, Portugal, from 1978 to 2015.

== Early years ==
Jardim was born on Madeira Island in 1943, son of Alberto Gonçalves Jardim (d. 1954) and wife Marceliana do Patrocínio de Jesus Cardoso (Funchal, São Pedro, baptized 2 September 1909 – 29 July 2006). He went to Coimbra in order to study at the local university, and he lived there for over a decade as a student. He was awarded a degree of Licentiate in Law from the Faculty of Law of the University of Coimbra in 1973.

Jardim became a secondary school teacher. He was also director of the Instituto de Emprego e Formação Profissional da Ilha da Madeira (Employment and Vocational Training Centre of Madeira Island). As a journalist, he was director of "Jornal da Madeira", and wrote for different Portuguese newspapers and magazines.

== Politics ==
He was one of the Founders of the then Popular Democratic Party (PPD) in May 1974, a month after the Carnation Revolution, together with Francisco Sá Carneiro, Francisco Pinto Balsemão, Joaquim Magalhães Mota, Carlos Mota Pinto, João Bosco Mota Amaral, António Barbosa de Melo and António Marques Mendes, and co-founder of its Madeiran branch.

First elected in 1978 at the age of 35, Alberto João Jardim was then successively elected President of the Regional Government of Madeira 10 times. He is a member of the:

- Council of State of the Portuguese Republic as the President of the Regional Government of Madeira
- State Defense Council of the Portuguese Republic
- State Internal Defense Superior Council of the Portuguese Republic
- Homeland Security Superior Council of the Portuguese Republic.

He is one of the longest-serving, democratically elected leaders of any jurisdiction in the world.

Alberto João Jardim is also a member and former Vice President (2000–2001) of the European Union Committee of the Regions. He is Honorary President of the European Summit of Regions & Cities.

He is the founder and a member of the Assembly of European Regions. He was Vice President of European People's Party.

On 19 February 2007, he resigned from his office in protest against the new law on regional finances enacted by the national government of José Sócrates. Due to his resignation, early elections had to be scheduled, which he won easily. The national government, nevertheless, announced that the law wouldn't be changed.

On 8 January 2011, he suffered a heart attack but recovered and won elections again on 9 October 2011, after winning he promised to resign in early 2015.

On 12 January 2015, he retired as President of the Social Democratic Party of Madeira, elections were held and he was succeeded by Miguel Albuquerque.

On 14 February 2015, during the carnival of Madeira which Alberto usually participated, he wore a Greek traditional hat, he stated that it was to show his solidarity for the people of Greece and Syriza. He also warned that the new government of Madeira that will replace him should be strong and not bow to the government of Lisbon, because the people of Madeira want strong leadership because Madeira has been robbed by Lisbon for 5 and half centuries, therefore justifying the financial hole that occurred during the later part of his presidency and if they fail to deliver Je suis un Syriza (I am a Syriza) (It has been speculated that this could mean he would make a comeback if Madeira needed him).

On 29 March 2015, regional elections were held and Alberto ruled himself out as he had said he would in 2011, Miguel Albuquerque won the election and became the new president on 20 April 2015.

== Family ==
In 1968, he married Maria Ângela Andrade Martins (born 1940) and had three children:

- Cláudia Sofia Martins Gonçalves Jardim (born 24 August 1970), married to David Gomes and mother of Maria Carlota Jardim Gomes (born 1998)
- Pedro Alberto Martins Gonçalves Jardim (born 8 January 1972), single
- Andreia Luísa Martins Gonçalves Jardim (born 1975), married to José Miguel Monteiro de Resende Tropa (born 1975) and mother of Pedro Afonso Gonçalves Jardim de Resende Tropa (born 2005), Maria Pilar Gonçalves Jardim de Resende Tropa (n. 2013) and João Francisco Gonçalves Jardim de Resende Tropa (2013).

== Controversies ==
A controversial personality, Jardim is usually seen as an outspoken populist, who is infamous for his often outspoken remarks about his political opponents, from left to right, including several journalists.

As Madeira's democratically elected political leader for over 30 years, his supporters, particularly those within the Archipelago of Madeira proper, view him as a responsible and proactive governor. Critics and observers have noted his confrontational and explosive communication style. During his time in office, Madeira has experienced significant developments in several areas under Jardim's leadership.

However, the European Union assistance to its ultra-peripheral regions, which includes the Portuguese archipelago of Madeira, has played a major role in the region's development; Madeira's development has been massively aided by structural and cohesion funds allocated by the European Union to the regional government.

In addition, Jardim's government of the autonomous region was financially supported, decade across decade, by massive public debt creation and wild over-expenditure. An even more surprising scandal was reported on 16 September 2011, when Portugal's central bank said Madeira Island had under-reported its debt since 2004, putting further pressure on the country to meet deficit targets under an international bailout. An evaluation conducted by the Bank of Portugal of Madeira's accounts showed it failed to report EUR1.1 billion ($1.53 billion) in debt from 2008 to 2010 alone. The Bank of Portugal called the omission "grave," adding it doesn't know of any similar cases in the rest of the country.

The debt was finally totaled at €6 billion, €3 billion less than the total that Alberto said mainland Portugal owed Madeira.

His name has been often associated with the Madeira Archipelago Liberation Front (FLAMA), the archipelago's defunct far-right separatist terrorist organization that undertook 70 bombings in Madeira between 1975 and 1978. Although no FLAMA activists were ever brought to justice, Alberto João Jardim has often supported their cause, stating that "they should receive a reward not a punishment, since they're defenders of democracy and of the homeland".

== Other affiliations ==
- He was a fan of C.S. Marítimo, a sports club from Funchal. In 1997, he tried to join the three biggest teams from Funchal in one unified and governmental team. Then the popular Marítimo's supporters denied that intention in a big demonstration. After that, he has been seen on the C. D. Nacional side. He will be the president of the commemorations of the 100 years of Nacional.
- Invited Professor of the Universidade Independente, a Private University in Lisbon.

== Honours and Distinctions ==
=== National Honours and Distinctions ===
==== Portuguese Ancient Military Orders ====
- Grand Cross of the Order of Christ (21 December 2015)

==== Portuguese National Orders ====
- Grand Cross of the Order of Prince Henry (12 December 1984)

==== Municipal Honours ====
- Funchal Medal of Honour
- Santa Cruz Medal of Honour
- São Vicente Collar of Honour

==== Other Portuguese Distinctions ====
- Commander of Benefaction of the Portuguese Red Cross Medal
- Portuguese Firemen League Gratitude Medal
- Portuguese Firemen League Meritorious Service Medal
- Portuguese Firemen League 20 Years of Good Service Medal
- Madeiran Volunteer Firemen 50 Years Commemorative Medal
- National Scouts Corps Meritorious Service Medal

=== Foreign Honours ===
==== European ====
- Robert Schuman Medal (EPP Group)
- "Pro Merito" Medal (Council of Europe)

==== Sweden ====
- Commander Grand Cross of the Order of the Polar Star

==== Venezuela ====
===== Federal Orders =====
- Grand Officer of the Order of the Liberator
- Generalísimo (First Class) of the Order of Francisco de Miranda

===== State Orders =====
- Guárico State's Order of Ricardo Montilha
- Aragua State's Order of Saurau de Aragua
- Lara State's Order of Jacinto Lara

===== Municipal Orders =====
- Chacao Municipality's Order of Community
- Iribarren Municipality's Order of Juan Guilhermo Iribarren

=== Other Honours ===
- Honorary Knight of the Byzantine Order of the Holy Sepulchre

=== Academic Distinctions ===
==== European ====
- "Honoris Causa" doctorate in Political Sciences, granted by the Italian University of St. Cirilio.

==== National ====
- "Honoris Causa" doctorate granted by the University of Madeira.

== Published books ==
- Tribuna Livre (3 vols.)
- Pela Autonomia e o Desenvolvimento Integral (2 vols.)
- A Experiência da Autonomia Regional da Madeira
- Regionalização, Europa, Estado e Poder Local

Party political offices
Preceded by -	President of the Social Democratic Party of Madeira; 1978–2015	Succeeded by Miguel Albuquerque
Political offices
Preceded by Jaime Ornelas Camacho	President of the Regional Government of Madeira; 1978–2015	Succeeded by Miguel Albuquerque
