= Legislative Assembly of Madeira =

Legislature of the Portuguese autonomous region of Madeira

Legislative Assembly of the Autonomous Region of Madeira Assembleia Legislativa da Região Autónoma da Madeira
- XV Legislature
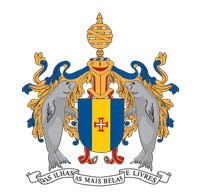

Type
- Type: Unicameral Regional Parliament

History
- Founded: 1976

Leadership
- President: Rubina Leal, PPD/PSD since 10 April 2025
- Vice-President: José Prada, PPD/PSD since 15 October 2019
- Vice-President: Rafaela Fernandes, PPD/PSD since 23 April 2025
- Vice-President: Rafael Nunes, JPP since 10 April 2025

Structure
- Seats: 47
- Political groups: Regional Government (24): PPD/PSD (23); CDS–PP (1); Opposition (23): JPP (11); PS (8); CH (2); IL (1); Ind. (1)
- Length of term: 6 months to 4 years
- Salary: Deputy = €3719.79/month

Elections
- Voting system: Party-list proportional representation D'Hondt method
- Last election: 23 March 2025

Meeting place
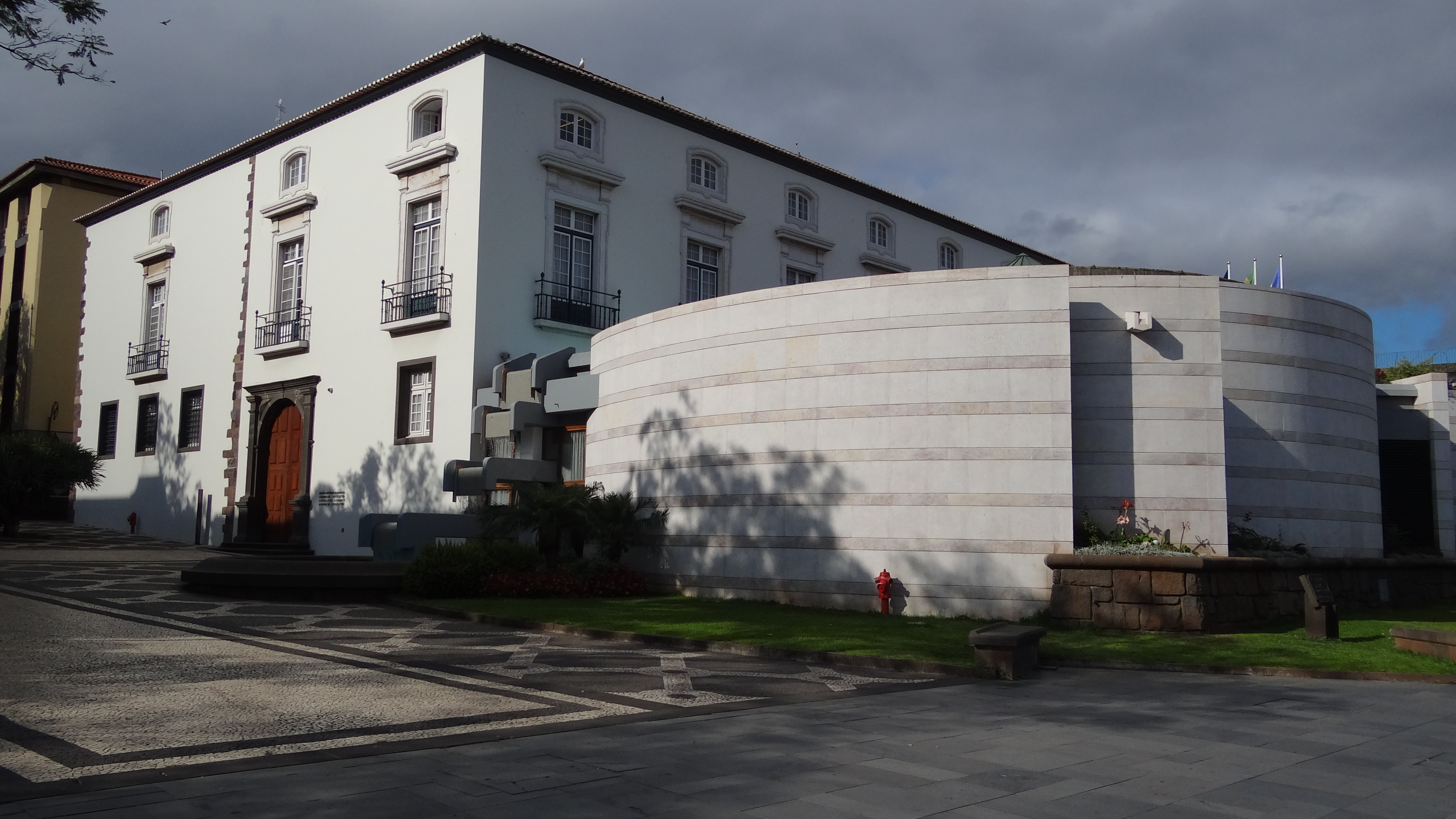
- Legislative Assembly of Madeira Building, Funchal

Website
- http://www.alram.pt/

The Legislative Assembly of Madeira (Portuguese: Assembleia Legislativa da Madeira) is the legislature of the Portuguese autonomous region of Madeira. The last regional election was held on 23 March 2025, won by the Social Democratic Party (PSD) with 62,059 votes (43.41% share).

== Powers and duties of the Assembly ==
The Political and Administrative Statute of the Autonomous Region of Madeira, clearly states that the Legislative Assembly has the following powers:

=== Political powers ===
- Approve the Regional Government Program;
- Approve the Regional Economic and Social Development Plan;
- Approve the Regional Budget, including those of the autonomous regional funds and the investment programs of each regional secretariat;
- Authorize the Regional Government to make internal and external loans and other medium and long-term credit operations in accordance with the Statute and the law;
- Establish the maximum limit of guarantees to be granted by the Regional Government in each year;
- Vote motions of confidence and censure to the Regional Government;
- Submit proposals for a regional referendum on issues of relevant regional specific interest, pursuant to these Statutes and the law;
- Define the major guidelines for intervention by the Region in the process of European construction and to monitor and appreciate the activity carried out in this field by the Regional Government, namely through the approval of motions for guidance and instruments for framing economic and social development;
- Issue opinions, on its own initiative or in consultation with the sovereign bodies, on matters within the competence of those that respect the Region;
- Participate in the definition of the positions of the Portuguese State in the context of the process of European construction, in matters of specific interest to the Region;
- Participate in the process of European construction in accordance with the Constitution and Article 96 of the Statute, i.e. when matters of specific interest to the Region are at stake.;
- Establish cooperation with other foreign regional entities and participate in organizations that aim to foster interregional dialogue and cooperation, in accordance with the guidelines defined by the sovereign bodies with competence in matters of foreign policy;
- Elect personalities for any position that, by law, it is incumbent upon him to designate;
- Participate through their representatives in the meetings of the commissions of the Assembly of the Republic where legislative proposals emanating from the Legislative Assembly are discussed.

=== Legislative powers ===
- Exercise, in its own exclusive right, the power to elaborate, modify and withdraw projects or proposals for the amendment of the Political and Administrative Statute of the Region, as well as to issue opinions on the respective rejection or introduction of changes by the Assembly of the Republic;
- Exercise legislative initiative through the presentation of proposals for law or amendments to the Assembly of the Republic, as well as requiring the declaration of urgency of the respective processing;
- Legislate, with respect for the fundamental principles of general laws of the Republic, in matters of specific interest to the Region that are not reserved to the sovereign bodies;
- Legislate, under authorization of the Assembly of the Republic, on matters of specific interest to the Region that are not reserved to the competence of the organs;
- Develop, depending on the specific interest of the Region, the basic laws in matters not reserved to the competence of the Assembly of the Republic;
- Exercise its own tax powers and to adapt the national tax system to the Region under the terms set on Political and Administrative Statute and the law;
- Create and extinguish local authorities, as well as to modify the respective area, under the terms of the law;
- Elevate settlements;
- Create public services, institutions, public funds and public companies that carry out their exclusive or predominant activity in the Region;
- Define unlawful acts of mere social order and respective sanctions, without prejudice to paragraph 1), item 165 of article 165 of the Constitution.

==== Jurisdiction ====
As set on the Political and Administrative Statute of the Autonomous Region of Madeira, the Assembly has jurisdiction over the following matters:

- Demographic, emigration and resident status policy;
- Guardianship over local authorities and their territorial demarcation;
- Guidance, direction, coordination and inspection of public services and institutes and nationalized or public companies that exercise their activity exclusively or predominantly in the Region and in other cases where the regional interest justifies it;
- Infrastructure and maritime and air transport, including stopovers and tariffs. Administration of ports and airports, including port and airport taxes and fees between islands and from abroad to islands;
- Fisheries, aquaculture, agriculture, forestry, livestock.
- Legal regime and land exploitation, including rural leasing;
- Soil policy, spatial planning, ecological balance and environment protection. Including protection of nature and natural resources, as well as public, animal and plant health;
- Water, mineral and thermal resources;
- Energy from local production;
- Health and social security;
- Work, employment, professional training, pre-school education, basic, secondary, higher and special education;
- Classification, protection and enhancement of cultural heritage;
- Museums, libraries and archives;
- Public shows and entertainment;
- Sports;
- Tourism and hospitality;
- Crafts and folklore;
- Expropriation, for public benefit, of assets located in the Region, as well as civil requisition;
- Public works and social equipment;
- Housing and urbanism;
- Media;
- Internal, external trade and supply;
- Foreign direct investment and technology transfer;
- Mobilization of savings formed in the Region with a view to financing investments made in it;
- Industrial development;
- Adaptation of the tax system to the regional economic reality and concession of tax benefits;
- Articulation of the Regional Civil Protection Service with the competent national entities;
- Regional statistics;
- Forests, parks and nature reserves;
- Circulation, transit and land transport routes;
- Sea shore;
- Valorization of human resources and quality of life;
- Organization of the regional administration and the services included therein, including the central administration;
- Maintenance of public order;
- Interregional cooperation and dialogue under the terms of paragraph u) of paragraph 1 of article 227 of the Constitution;
- Construction, installation or use of military bases, as well as infrastructures and related equipment;
- Construction, installation or use of infrastructures for the purpose of observation, study and scientific research;
- Other matters that exclusively concern the Region or that assume a particular configuration there.

=== Supervisory powers ===
- Ensure compliance with the Constitution, the Statute and the laws and assess the actions of the Government and the regional administration;
- Approve the Region's accounts for each economic year and review the reports on the implementation of the Regional Plan for Economic and Social Development;
- Request the Constitutional Court to declare unconstitutionality and illegality of rules issued by the sovereign bodies for violation of the rights of the Region, namely the rights provided for in the present Statute;
- To supervise the application of structural funds in the Region and other community programs of regional or national scope affecting the Region.

=== Regulatory powers ===
- It is incumbent upon the Legislative Assembly, in the exercise of regulatory functions, to regulate the general laws issued by the sovereign bodies that do not reserve the respective regulatory power for them.

== Structure and election ==
The Legislative Assembly of Madeira is composed of deputies, elected by universal, direct and secret suffrage, by constituencies. According to the Electoral Law, the regional parliament has 47 deputies elected in a single regional constituency. Voters are Portuguese citizens registered in the voter registration of any municipality in the Madeiran archipelago.

=== Committees ===
Following the Portuguese parliamentary system in the Legislative Assembly there are Permanent Specialized Committees, with specific competences, and there may be Occasional Committees, with their own competences, the latter are created for a limited time and aim to fulfil a certain function that culminates with the presentation of a report describing the work carried out, containing the respective conclusions, including Inquiry Committees.

Official Numbering	Permanent Specialized Committee	Additional Competences
I	General Politics and Youth	European Union, Madeiran Communities Abroad, Local Authorities and Youth
II	Economy, Finances and Tourism	Planning, Transportation and Innovation
III	Natural Resources and Environment	Agriculture, Fishery, Husbandry and Forestry
IV	Housing and Public Buildings	Territorial Planning
V	Health and Social Affairs	Civil Protection
VI	Education, Sports and Culture	Science
VII	Civil Service, Administration and Employment	

== Architecture ==
In 1976, the beginning of the I Legislature and until December 4, 1987, the date of the inauguration of the current facilities, the Assembly's services were based in the building of the former Junta Geral, on Avenida Zarco.

The new headquarters was installed in the Old Customs of Funchal building, classified as a National Monument. The building's restoration project, then vacant, was carried out by the architect Raul Chorão Ramalho.

Leaning against the old Manueline staircase to the east of the building, is the Chapel of Santo António da Mouraria, founded in 1714.

== Regional elections ==
- 1976
- 1980
- 1984
- 1988
- 1992
- 1996
- 2000
- 2004
- 2007
- 2011
- 2015
- 2019
- 2023
- 2024
- 2025

== Elected Composition of the Legislative Assembly of Madeira since 1976 ==
Legislatures since 1976
UDP / BE / PCP / PTP / PS / JPP / PSN / PAN / PPD/PSD / MPT / IL / CDS–PP / PND / CH
1976	2 / 8 / 29 / 2
1980	2 / 1 / 5 / 35 / 1
1984	2 / 1 / 6 / 40 / 1
1988	3 / 7 / 41 / 2
1992	2 / 1 / 12 / 1 / 39 / 2
1996	1 / 2 / 13 / 41 / 2
2000	2 / 2 / 13 / 41 / 3
2004	1 / 2 / 19 / 44 / 2
2007	1 / 2 / 7 / 33 / 1 / 2 / 1
2011	1 / 3 / 6 / 1 / 25 / 1 / 9 / 1
2015	2 / 2 / 1 / 5 / 5 / 24 / 7 / 1
2019	1 / 19 / 3 / 21 / 3
2023	1 / 1 / 11 / 5 / 1 / 20 / 1 / 3 / 4
2024	11 / 9 / 1 / 19 / 1 / 2 / 4
2025	8 / 11 / 23 / 1 / 1 / 3

== See also ==
- List of presidents of the Legislative Assembly of the Autonomous Region of Madeira
- Legislative Assembly of the Azores
