= Santa Cruz, Madeira =

Santa Cruz
- Municipality
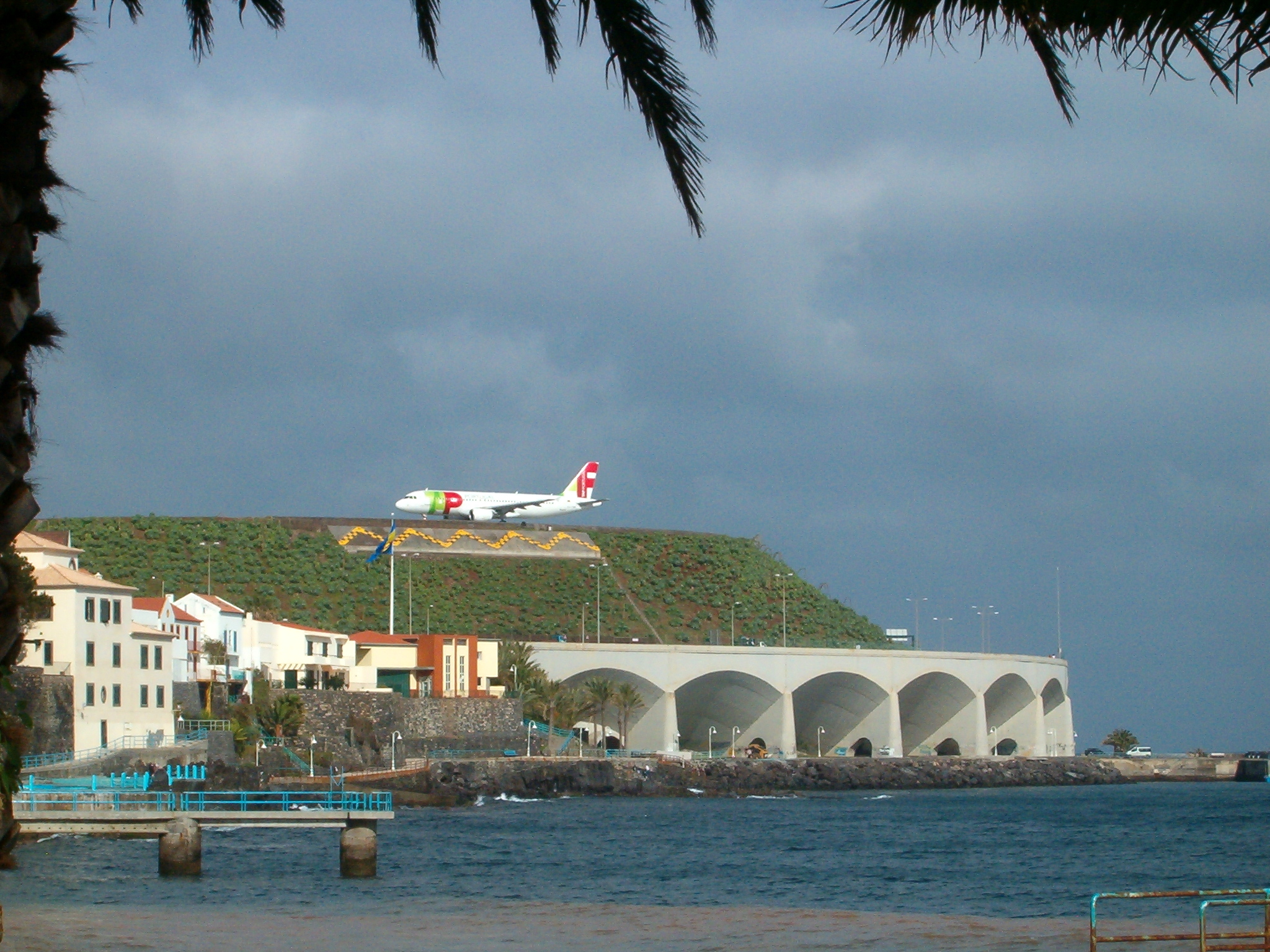
- Houses in Santa Cruz, with the arcades of the International Airport in the distance

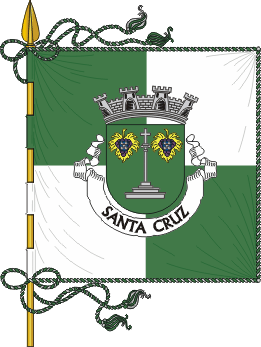
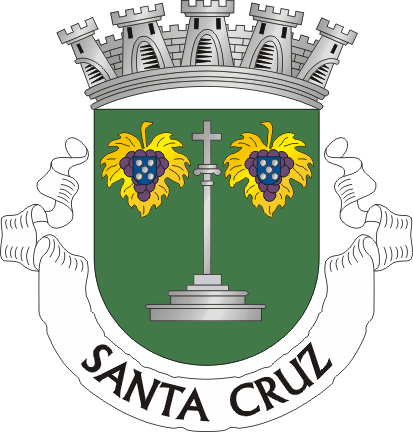
- Flag Coat of arms
- Interactive map of Santa Cruz
- Coordinates: 32°41′00″N 16°48′00″W
- Country: Portugal
- Auton. region: Madeira
- Island: Madeira
- Established: Settlement: c.1425 - c.1440 Municipality: 25 June 1515; City: 2 August 1996
- Parishes: 5

Government
  - President: Élia Ascensão (JPP)

Area
  - Total: 81.50 km^{2} (31.47 sq mi)
- Elevation: 32 m (105 ft)

Population (2011)
  - Total: 43,005
  - Density: 527.7/km^{2} (1,367/sq mi)
- Time zone: UTC+00:00 (WET)
  - Summer (DST): UTC+01:00 (WEST)
- Postal code: 9100-157
- Area code: 291
- Patron: São Salvador & Santa Cruz
- Local holiday: 15 January
- Website: http://www.cm-santacruz.pt

Santa Cruz (Portuguese pronunciation: [ˈsɐ̃tɐ ˈkɾuʃ]; "Holy Cross") is a municipality, a parish and a city in the eastern part of the island of Madeira. It is the second most populous municipality, behind Funchal. The population in 2011 was 43,005, in an area of 81.50 km^{2}.

== History ==
"...passing a turn in the land, they entered a cover in the beach, in which they saw a deliteful valley covered in the trees in order, where they found on land a few older fallen columns, from whom the captain ordered the construction a cross, which they raised to the heights of a tree, giving the place the name of Santa Cruz, where later that founded the noble village."

To commemorate the construction of this cross, a second cross was raised, of marble, but was later destroyed, around 1889.

== Geography ==
It is located southeast of Santana, southwest of Machico and northeast of the regional capital (Funchal); it is linked by an expressway to Funchal and Machico, as well as an ancillary road linking it to Santana. Urban sprawl from Funchal extends along Santa Cruz's western frontier, while the eastern part of the municipality is the base for Madeira's international airport.

Five parishes comprise the municipality of Santa Cruz:

- Camacha
- Caniço (city)
- Gaula
- Santa Cruz (city) (includes the offshore Desertas Islands)
- Santo António da Serra

== Economy ==
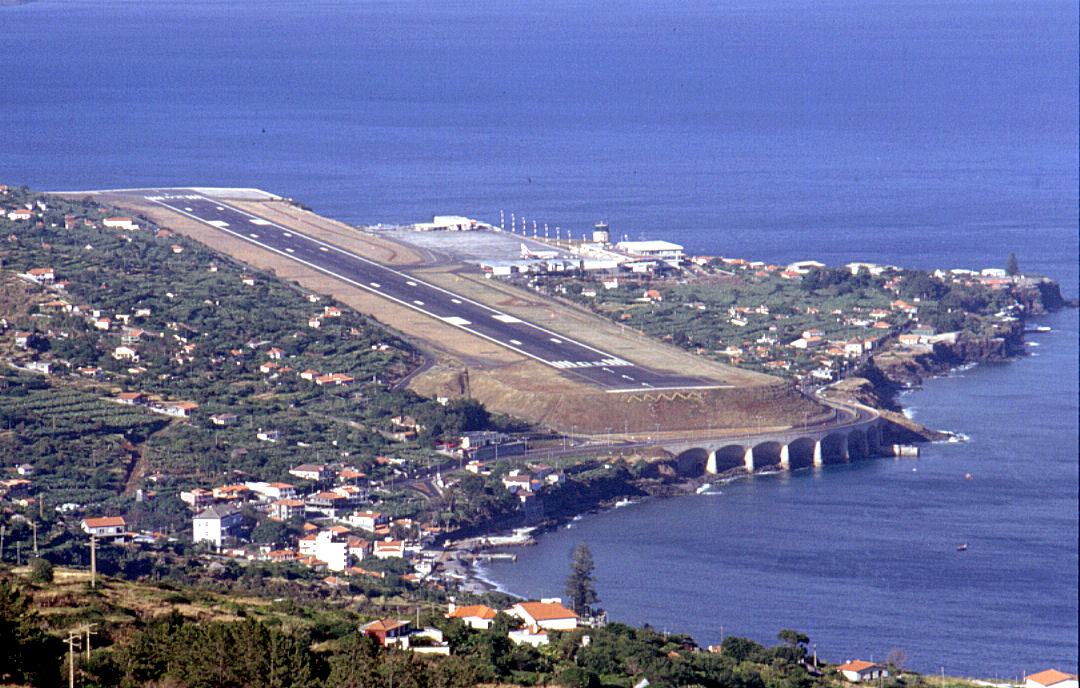
Cristiano Ronaldo International Airport, was expanded onto pylons over the ocean, as part of the island's economic expansions

Agriculture and fishing are still considered the primary industries in this region, although widespread expansion of tourism in the south, and the development of the international airport has increased the number of commercial and tourist-related activities (primarily in the city of Santa Cruz).

== Notable people ==
- Joseph Costa (1909 in Caniço – 1998) a Portuguese American aviator
- Bishop José Alfredo Caires de Nobrega (born 1951 in Caniço) the bishop of the Diocese of Mananjary in Mananjary, Madagascar
- José Manuel Coelho (born 1952 in Gaula) a Portuguese politician.
- João Rodrigues (born 1971 in Santa Cruz) a windsurfer; competed in every Summer Olympic Games from 1992 to 2016
- Vânia Jesus (born 1979 in Santa Cruz) a Portuguese politician.
