= Madeira =

Portuguese archipelago in the North Atlantic

- Autonomous Region of Portugal and outermost region of the European Union
- Autonomous Region of Madeira; Região Autónoma da Madeira (Portuguese)
- Flag Coat of arms
- Nickname(s): Pearl of the Atlantic
- Motto: Das Ilhas as Mais Belas e Livres (English: "Of all islands, the most beautiful and free")
- Anthem: Hino da Região Autónoma da Madeira (English: "Anthem of the Autonomous Region of Madeira")
- Location of Madeira within Portuguese territory (dark green) and the European Union (light green)
- Country: Portugal
- Appeared In Atlas: 1351
- Discovery: 1418–1419
- Claimed: 1419
- Settlement: c. 1425
- Autonomous status: 30 April 1976
- Named after: English: wood (Portuguese: madeira)
- Capital and largest city: Funchal; 32°45′N 17°00′W
- Official languages: Portuguese
- Demonym(s): English: Madeiran (Portuguese: Madeirense)

Government
  - Representative of the Republic: Pedro Barreto Ferreira
  - President: Miguel Albuquerque
  - Speaker: Rubina Leal
- Legislature: Legislative Assembly

National and European representation
  - Assembly of the Republic: 6 MPs (of 230)
  - European Parliament: 1 MEP (of 21 Portuguese seats)

Area
  - Total: 801 km^{2} (309 sq mi)
- Highest elevation (Pico Ruivo): 1,861 m (6,106 ft)
- Lowest elevation (Atlantic Ocean): 0 m (0 ft)

Population
  - 2021 census: 250,769
  - Density: 313/km^{2} (810.7/sq mi)
- GDP (nominal): 2024 estimate
  - Total: ▲€7.486 billion
  - Per capita: ▲€ 31,231.60
- Gini (2023): ▼31.1 medium
- HDI (2022): ▲0.829 very high
- Currency: Euro (€) (EUR)
- Time zone: UTC±00:00 (WET)
  - Summer (DST): UTC+01:00 (WEST)
- Date format: yyyy-mm-dd
- Driving side: Right
- Calling code: +351 (291)
- Postal code: 90nn-94nn
- ISO 3166 code: PT-30
- Internet TLD: .pt
- Most populated island: Madeira Island
- Usual abbreviation: RAM
- Website: www.madeira.gov.pt

Madeira, (Note: English: /məˈdɪərə/ mə-DEER-ə or /məˈdɛərə/ mə-DAIR-ə, European Portuguese: [mɐˈðɐjɾɐ].) officially the Autonomous Region of Madeira, (Note: Portuguese: Região Autónoma da Madeira) is an autonomous region of Portugal, in the Atlantic Ocean about 805 km (500 miles) southwest of mainland Portugal. Together with the Azores, it is one of the two autonomous regions of Portugal and a special territory of the European Union. It is the southernmost point and region of Portugal.

Madeira is an archipelago situated in the North Atlantic Ocean, in the region of Macaronesia, just under 400 kilometres (250 mi) north of the Canary Islands, Spain, 520 kilometres (320 mi) west of Morocco and 805 kilometres (500 mi) southwest of mainland Portugal. Madeira sits on the African tectonic plate, but is culturally, politically and ethnically associated with Europe, with its population predominantly descended from Portuguese settlers. Its population was 251,060 in 2021. The capital of Madeira is Funchal, on the main island's south coast.

The archipelago includes the islands of Madeira, Porto Santo, and the Desertas, administered together with the separate archipelago of the Savage Islands. Roughly half of the population lives in Funchal. The region has political and administrative autonomy through the Administrative Political Statute of the Autonomous Region of Madeira provided for in the Portuguese Constitution. The region is an integral part of the European Union as an outermost region. Madeira generally has a mild/moderate subtropical climate with Mediterranean summer droughts and winter rain. Many microclimates are found at different elevations.

Madeira, uninhabited at the time, was claimed by Portuguese sailors in the service of Prince Henry the Navigator in 1419 and settled after 1420. The archipelago is the first territorial discovery of the exploratory period of the Age of Discovery. In the late 15th century, it was a major exporter of slave-cultivated sugar, and in the 18th century, of wine. A tourist trade developed from the late 19th century, but was insufficient to stem a pattern of emigration from the island to Africa and to the Americas.

Madeira today is a year-round resort, particularly for Portuguese, British (148,000 visits in 2021), and German tourists (113,000). It is by far the most populous and densely populated Portuguese island. The region is noted for its Madeira wine, flora, and fauna, with its pre-historic laurel forest, classified as a UNESCO World Heritage Site. The destination is certified by EarthCheck. The main harbour in Funchal has long been the leading Portuguese port in cruise ship dockings, an important stopover for Atlantic passenger cruises between Europe, the Caribbean and North Africa. In addition, the International Business Centre of Madeira, also known as the Madeira Free Trade Zone, was established in the 1980s. It includes mainly tax-related incentives.

== History ==
=== Ancient ===
Plutarch in his Parallel Lives (Sertorius, 75 AD) referring to the military commander Quintus Sertorius (d. 72 BC), relates that after his return to Cádiz, he met sailors who spoke of idyllic Atlantic islands: "The islands are said to be two in number separated by a very narrow strait and lie 10,000 furlongs [2,000 km] from Africa. They are called the Isles of the Blessed."

Archaeological evidence suggests that the islands may have been visited by the Vikings sometime between 900 and 1030.

=== Legend ===
During the reign of King Edward III of England, lovers Robert Machim and Anna d'Arfet were said to have fled from England to France in 1346. Driven off course by a violent storm, their ship ran aground along the coast of an island that may have been Madeira. Later, this legend was the basis of the naming of the city of Machico on the island, in memory of the young lovers.

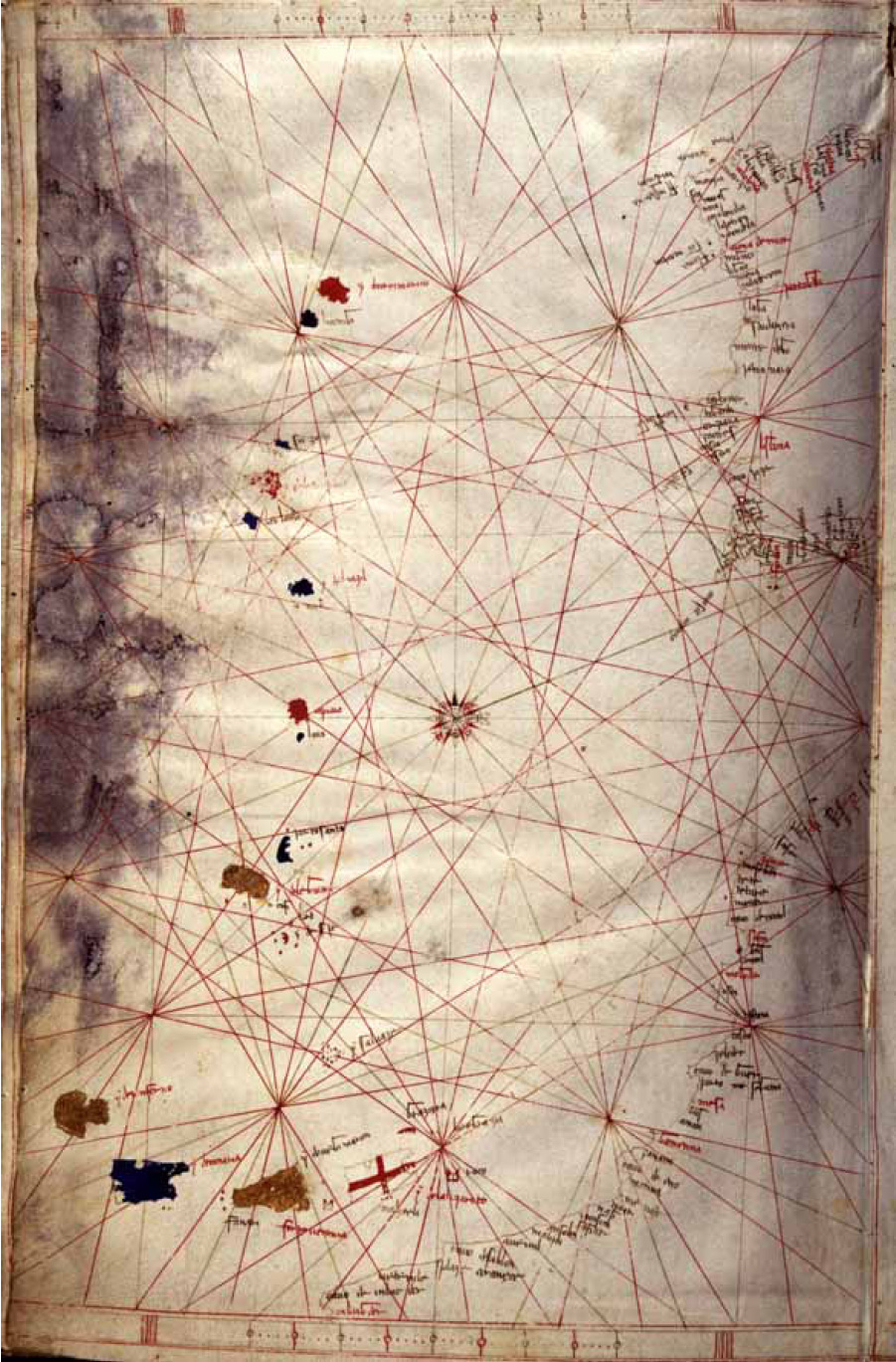
The fourth and final sheet of the four-sheet Corbitis Atlas (1384–1410)

=== European exploration ===
Madeira appears in several medieval manuscripts, including the Book of Knowledge of All Kingdoms from the early 14th century, the Medici-Laurentian Atlas from 1351, the Soleri Portolani from 1380 and 1385 and Corbitis Atlas from the late 14th century. These texts refer to Madeira as Lecmane, Lolegname, Legnami (the isle of wood), Puerto or Porto Santo, deserte or deserta, and desierta. It is widely accepted that knowledge of these Atlantic islands existed before their better-documented discovery and successful settlement by the Kingdom of Portugal.

In 1418, two captains, João Gonçalves Zarco and Tristão Vaz Teixeira, while exploring the African coast in the service of Prince Henry the Navigator, were driven off course by a storm to an island which they named Porto Santo (English: "holy harbour") in gratitude for divine deliverance from a shipwreck.

The following year, Zarco and Vaz organised an expedition with Bartolomeu Perestrello. The trio travelled to the island of Porto Santo, claimed it on behalf of the Portuguese Crown, and established a settlement. The new settlers observed "a heavy black cloud suspended to the southwest" and upon investigation discovered the larger island they called Madeira (Portuguese: madeira, lit. 'wood').

=== Settlement ===
The Portuguese settlers were the islands' original inhabitants, arriving around 1420 or 1425.

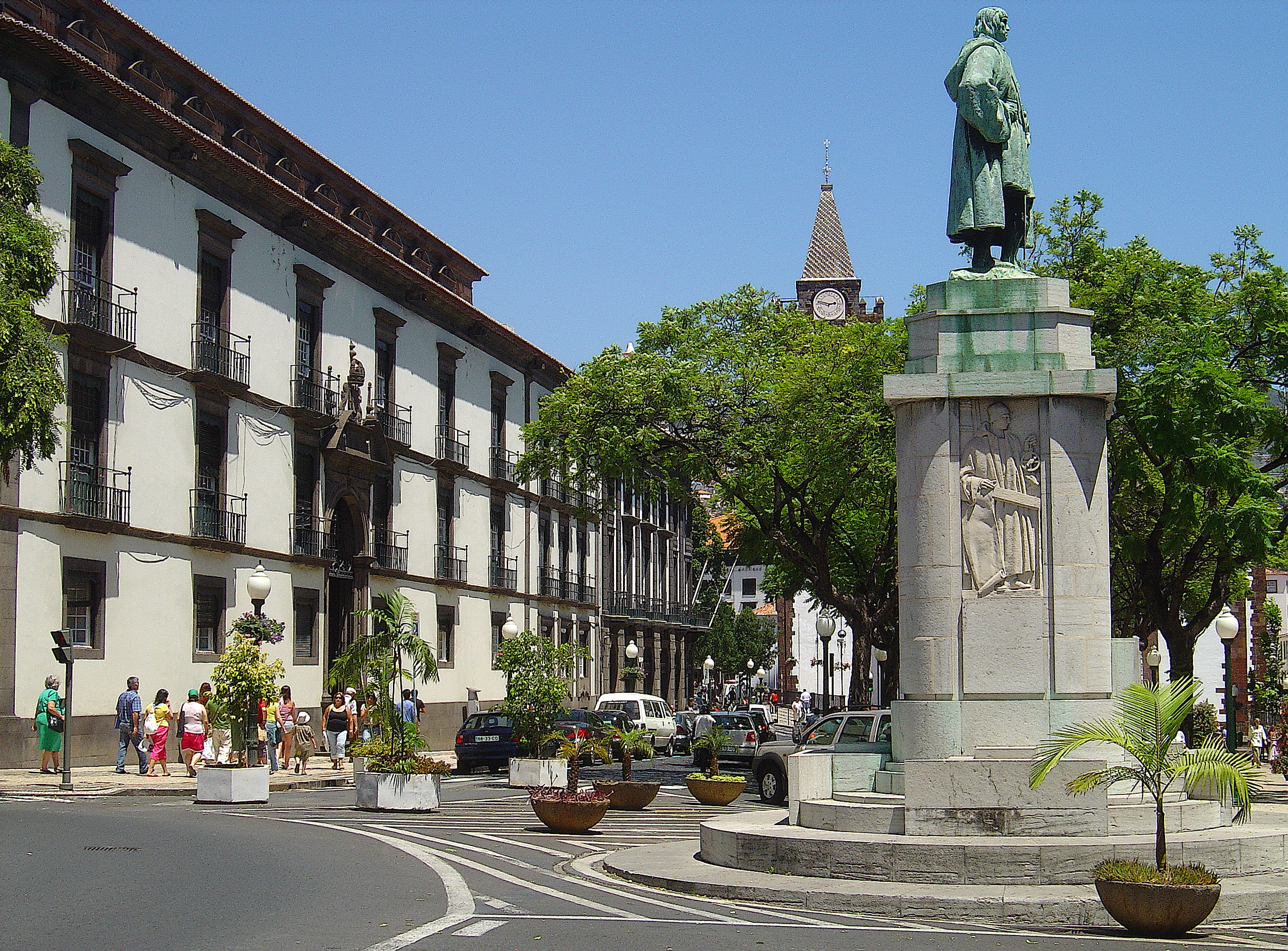
Statue of João Gonçalves Zarco

The three governors, knights of the Order of Christ and navigators: João Gonçalves Zarco, Tristão Vaz Teixeira and Bartolomeu Perestrelo, along with their respective families, became the first settlers of the archipelago, divided by three captaincies (respectively Funchal, Machico and Porto Santo). By order of King João I, this colonization process began in 1425 with people of modest means, some former prisoners of the Kingdom, and a group of lower ranking nobles. Included were fishermen and peasant farmers who willingly left Portugal in hopes of a better life than was possible in the Black Death ravaged mainland, wherein nobility strictly controlled the best farmlands. To help clear the island's dense laurisilva forests and transport wood to saw-mills, they brought with them indentured Berber labourers from Morocco.

Conditions did not favour the settlers' initial export, wheat, so that Henry the Navigator ordered the planting of other commercial crops. These included sugar cane, originally traded from India and the Arab world, but already being cultivated for Venetian merchants in Sicily and Cyprus.

=== Sugar island ===
Using advisers from Sicily and financed by Genoese capital (keen to bypass the Venetian monopoly in the Mediterranean), the sugar industry on the island was revolutionised by the introduction of water-driven mills and, by what remains today one of the most distinctive features of the Madeiran landscape, the island-wide system of irrigating levadas. By 1490, Madeira had become the principal source of European sugar supply.

Sugar attracted adventurers and merchants from Flanders (Antwerp becoming a major centre for refining and distribution), the Basque country, Catalonia and other parts of Europe. Their wealth and interests contributed to the development of Funchal as a major port of call for American, African and Asian bound shipping.

Levada dos Maroços runs above cultivated terraces toward Machico

Enslaved workers were critical to the sugar boom. They laboured not only in the cane fields and sugar mills but also in the construction and maintenance of the levadas, work that might see them suspended by ropes over steep precipices. The enslaved initially consisted of Guanches from the nearby Canary islands and exiled convicts from mainland Portugal known as Degredados, but these were soon replaced by people traded and seized from coasts of north and west Africa.

In advance of the industry's exhaustion of the island's soils and timber, their numbers peaked within production at the beginning of the 16th century, perhaps 2,000 out of a population of 20,000. Together with a relatively strong Portuguese garrison, the demographic balance may have ensured that, while individuals escaped into the rugged interior, there was not collective slave revolt, as in São Tomé from the 1530s and later on the much larger plantations in the Americas.

Madeira itself became a victim of the slave trade when in 1617 Barbary corsairs are reported to have carried off more than 1,800 people from the main island and Porto Santo. The island nonetheless maintained slavery as a legal practice until 1775/77, more than a decade after it had been abolished on the Portuguese mainland.

=== English wine traders, soldiers and tourists ===
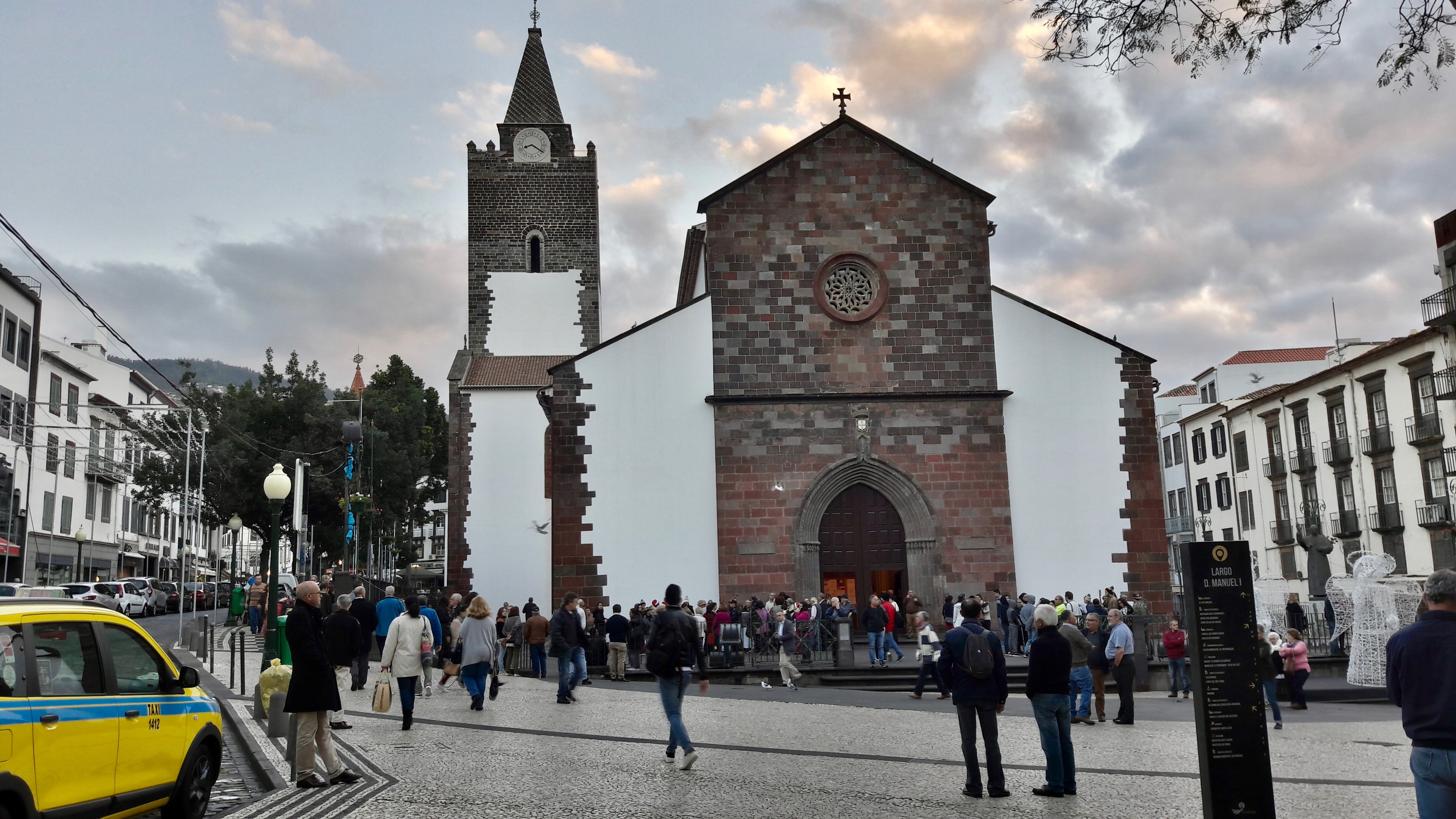
Cathedral of Funchal with its tower of 15th-century Gothic style in the background

In the 18th century, sugar plantations were replaced by vineyards, in a wine trade dominated by English merchants. The English traders acquired estates and built houses in Funchal, while supplying markets in Britain, the West Indies and the North American colonies (where the Founding Fathers of the United States are said to have raised glasses of Madeira wine in a toast to the Declaration of Independence).

The British first amicably occupied the island in 1801, whereafter Colonel William Henry Clinton became governor. A detachment of the 85th Regiment of Foot under Lieutenant-colonel James Willoughby Gordon garrisoned the island.

After the Peace of Amiens, British troops withdrew in 1802, only to reoccupy Madeira in 1807 until the end of the Peninsular War in 1814. In 1846, James Julius Wood wrote a series of seven sketches of the island. In 1856, British troops recovering from cholera and widows and orphans of soldiers fallen in the Crimean War were stationed in Funchal, Madeira.

The first tourist guide to Madeira appeared in 1850 and focused on the island's history, geology, flora, fauna and customs. Established by William Reid, the son of a Scottish crofter, the historic Belmond Reid's Palace opened in 1891. Famous guests included Winston Churchill, Józef Piłsudski, Gregory Peck, Rainer Maria Rilke and George Bernard Shaw. This early tourist trade came to depend on the supposed healing qualities of the island's climate such that, when in the twentieth century pasteurisation and antibiotics proved effective against tuberculosis, the number of visitors fell off sharply.

=== The world wars ===
During the Great War on 3 December 1916, a German U-boat, SM U-38, entered Funchal harbour on Madeira. U-38 torpedoed and sank three ships, bringing the war to Portugal. After attacking the ships, U-38 bombarded Funchal for two hours from a range of about 3 kilometres (2 mi). Batteries on Madeira returned fire and eventually forced U-38 to withdraw. On 12 December 1917, two German U-boats, SM U-156 and SM U-157, again bombarded Funchal. There were three fatalities and 17 wounded; several houses and the Santa Clara church were hit.

The last Austrian Emperor and King of Hungary, Charles I, exiled by the Allied Powers to Madeira after the war, died there on 1 April 1922. His sarcophagus lies in a memorial chapel of the Church of Our Lady of Monte.

Portugal in World War II was neutral, but maintained ties to Britain dating from the Treaty of Windsor (1386). As a result, Madeira took 2,000 evacuees from Gibraltar. Many of the Gibraltarians (fondly remembered as Gibraltinos), married locally and stayed on after the war. Some 200 were Jewish and in Funchal they found a Jewish cemetery that belonged to the Abudarham family, the same family after whom the Abudarham Synagogue is named in Gibraltar.

=== Economic depression, emigration and revolt ===
Between the wars, the Great Depression found the island already in a prolonged economic crisis. When the national government took control over imported grain, the price of flour and bread on the island rose dramatically, and strikes and riots broke out. Against this background, in April 1931 the island's garrison participated in a military uprising against the government of the National Dictatorship. Forces sent from the mainland crushed the Madeira uprising after seven days of fighting.

The growing distress of the islanders accelerated a long-established pattern of emigration to Africa and the Americas. This contributed to the existence today of 350,000 Madeirans and their descendants in South Africa and 200,000 in Venezuela, communities from which in the 21st century there have been many "returnees".

=== Autonomy ===
In the wake of the 1974 Carnation Revolution in Lisbon, there was a purported Madeira independence movement. Over the next four years, the Madeira Archipelago Liberation Front (Portuguese: Frente de Libertação do Arquipélago da Madeira), or FLAMA, carried out around 200 bomb attacks on the island, with one fatality. It may have represented more a reaction by some of the regional elites to the advance of the political left in the revolution, than truly ethnic or separatist sentiment. The 1976 Constitution granted Madeira an autonomous administration with its own legislature.

== Geography ==
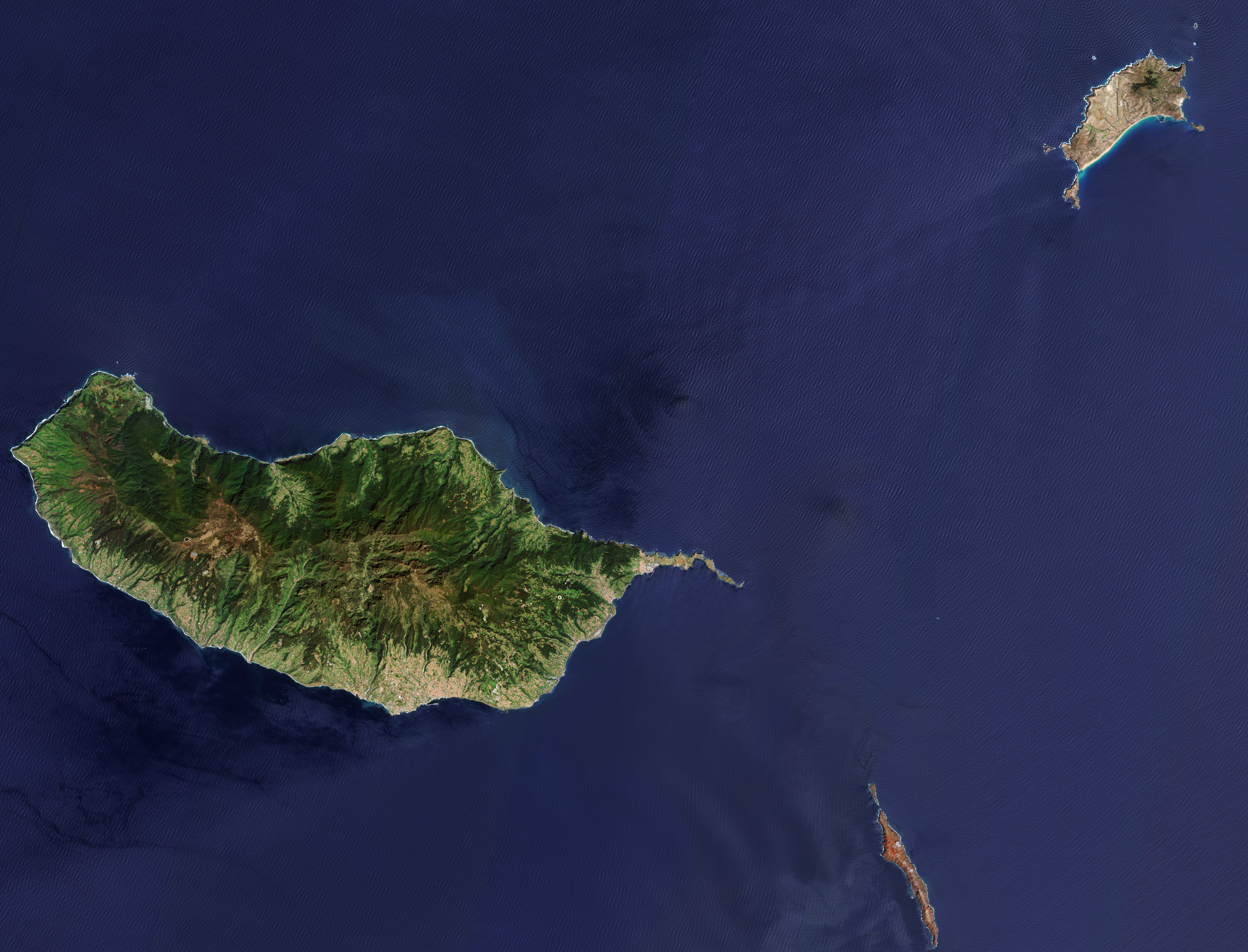
Satellite image of the Madeira archipelago by the Copernicus Sentinel-2 stellite, with Porto Santo on the top right, Madeira island on the center, and the Desertas islands at the bottom, with the Chão islet at the top and Deserta Grande island at the bottom. The Bugio Island and the Savage islands are not represented.

The Madeira archipelago is located 520 km (280 nmi) from the African coast, 805 km (430 nmi) from the closest point in the European coast (the Portuguese town of Sagres, in Algarve) and 1,000 km (540 nmi) from the capital of Portugal, Lisbon (approximately a one-and-a-half-hour flight). Madeira inhabits the extreme south of the Madeira-Tore Rise, a bathymetric structure oriented along a north-northeast to south-southwest axis that extends for 1,000 kilometres (540 nmi). This structure consists of long geomorphological relief that extends from the abyssal plain to 3,500 m (11,500 ft); its highest submerged point reaches a depth of about 150 m (490 ft) (around latitude 36°N). The origins of the Madeira-Tore Rise are not clearly established, but may have resulted from a buckling of the lithosphere.

=== Islands and islets ===
- Madeira (740.7 km^{2} or 286 sq mi), including Ilhéu de Agostinho, Ilhéu de São Lourenço, Ilhéu Mole (northwest); Total population: 262,456 (2011 Census).
- Porto Santo (42.5 km^{2} or 16.4 sq mi), including Ilhéu de Baixo ou da Cal, Ilhéu de Ferro, Ilhéu das Cenouras, Ilhéu de Fora, Ilhéu de Cima; Total population: 5,483 (2011 Census).
- Desertas Islands (14.2 km^{2} or 5.5 sq mi), including the three uninhabited islands: Deserta Grande Island, Bugio Island and Ilhéu de Chão.
- Savage Islands (3.6 km^{2} or 1.4 sq mi), archipelago 280 km south-southeast of Madeira Island including three main uninhabited islands and 16 islets in two groups: the Northeast Group (Selvagem Grande Island, Ilhéu de Palheiro da Terra, Ilhéu de Palheiro do Mar) and the Southwest Group (Selvagem Pequena Island, Ilhéu Grande, Ilhéu Sul, Ilhéu Pequeno, Ilhéu Fora, Ilhéu Alto, Ilhéu Comprido, Ilhéu Redondo, Ilhéu Norte).
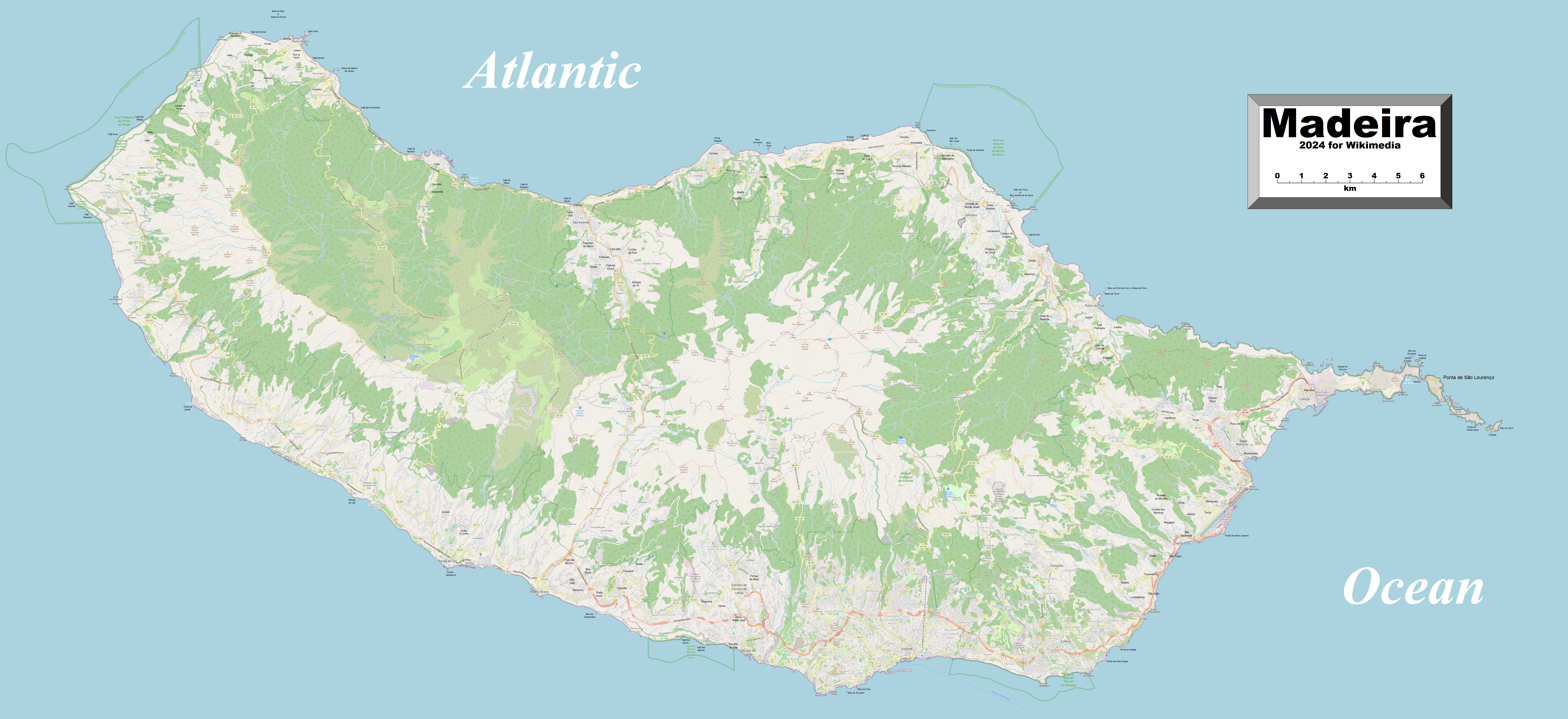
Comprehensive map of Madeira's main island

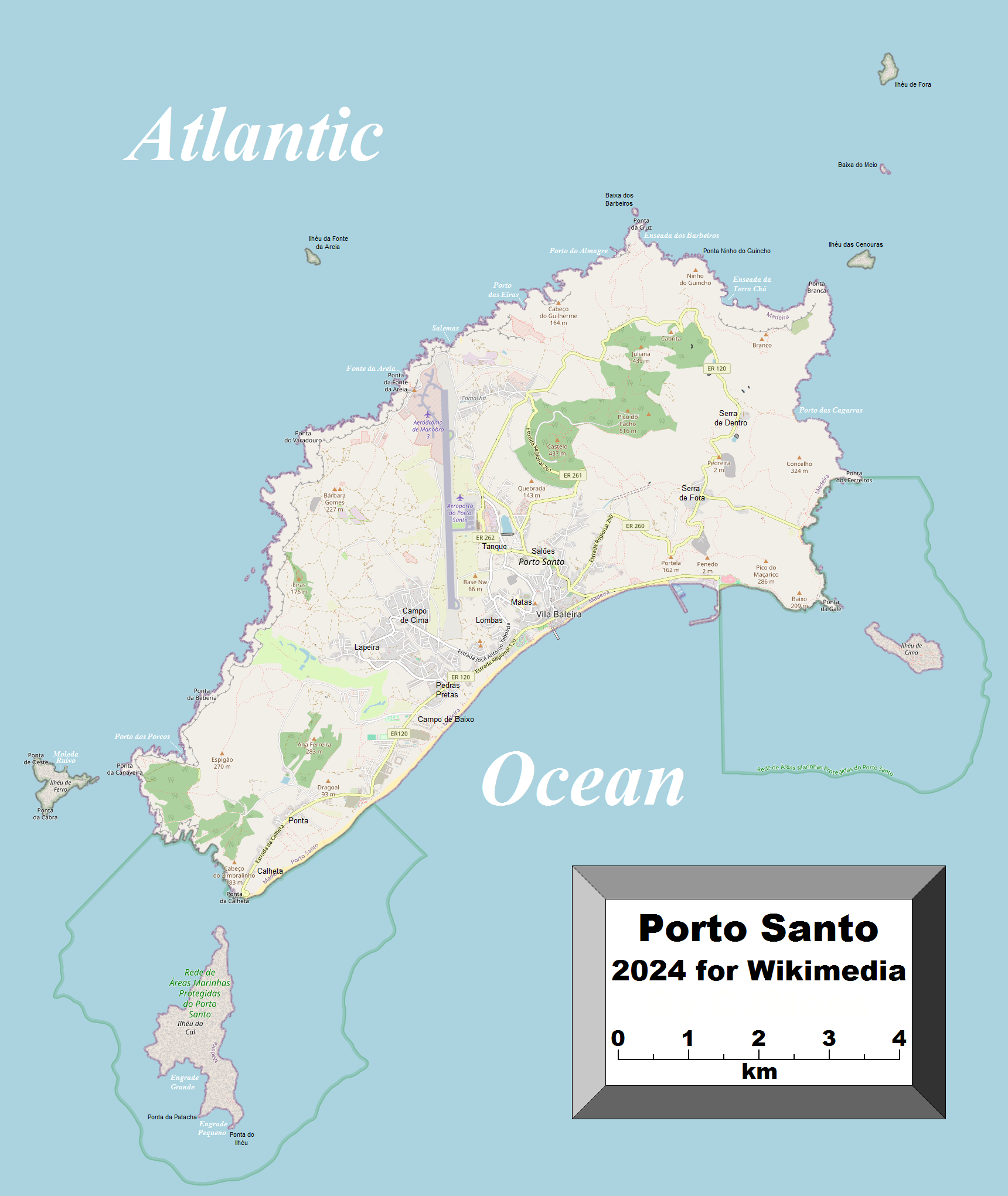
Comprehensive map of Madeira's outlying island of Porto Santo

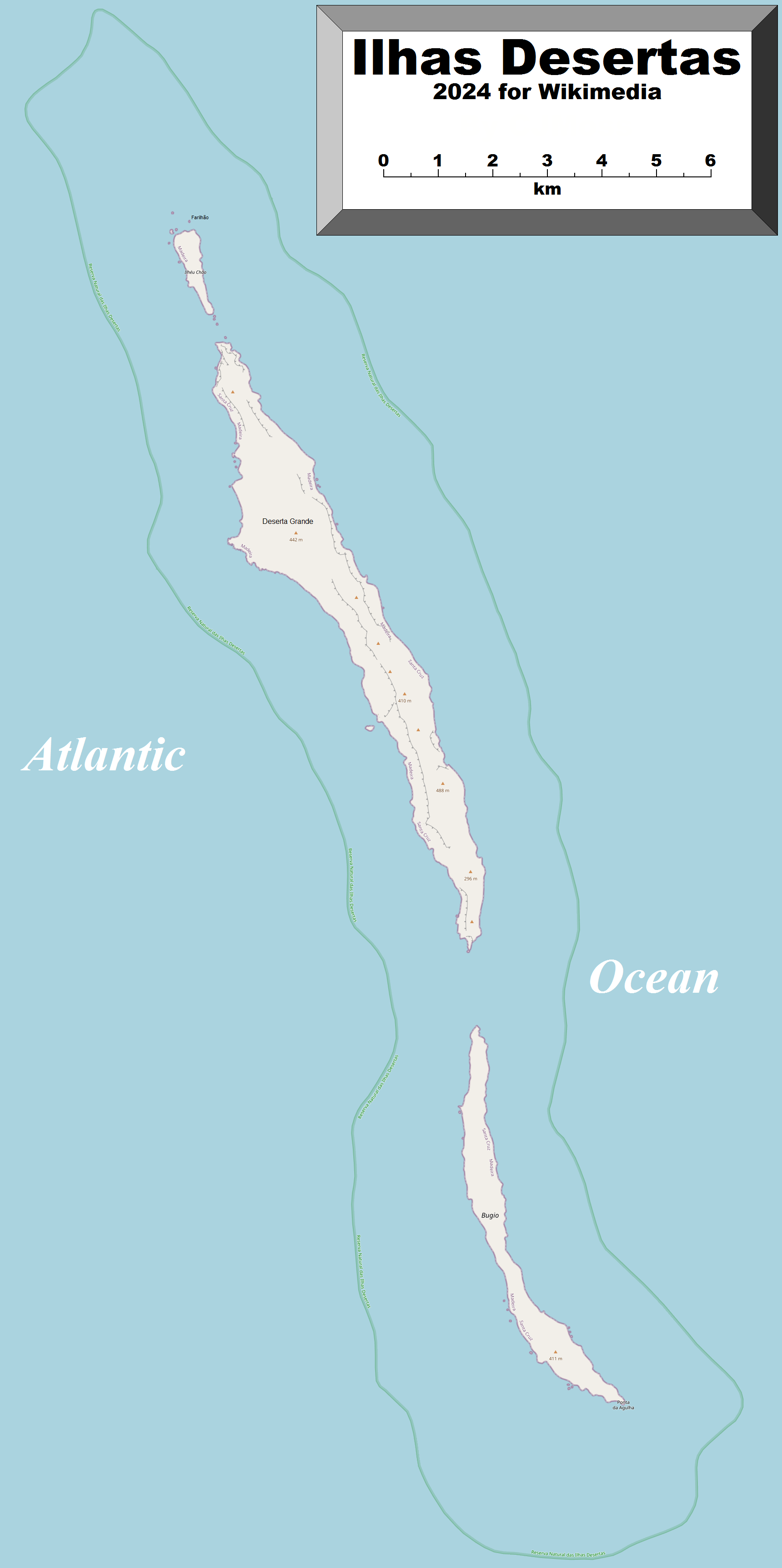
Map of the Ilhas Desertas

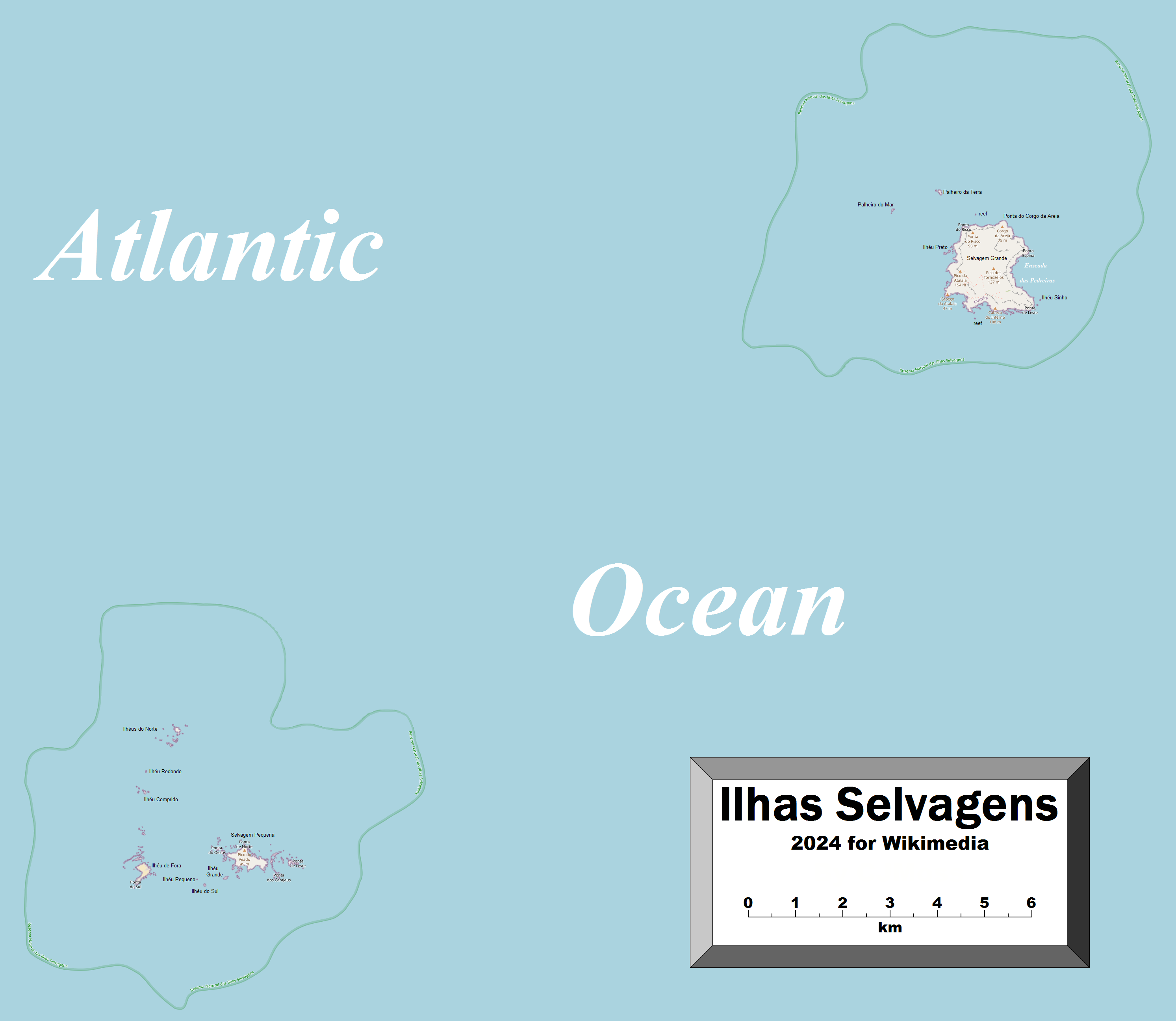
Map of the Ilhas Selvagens

=== Peaks ===
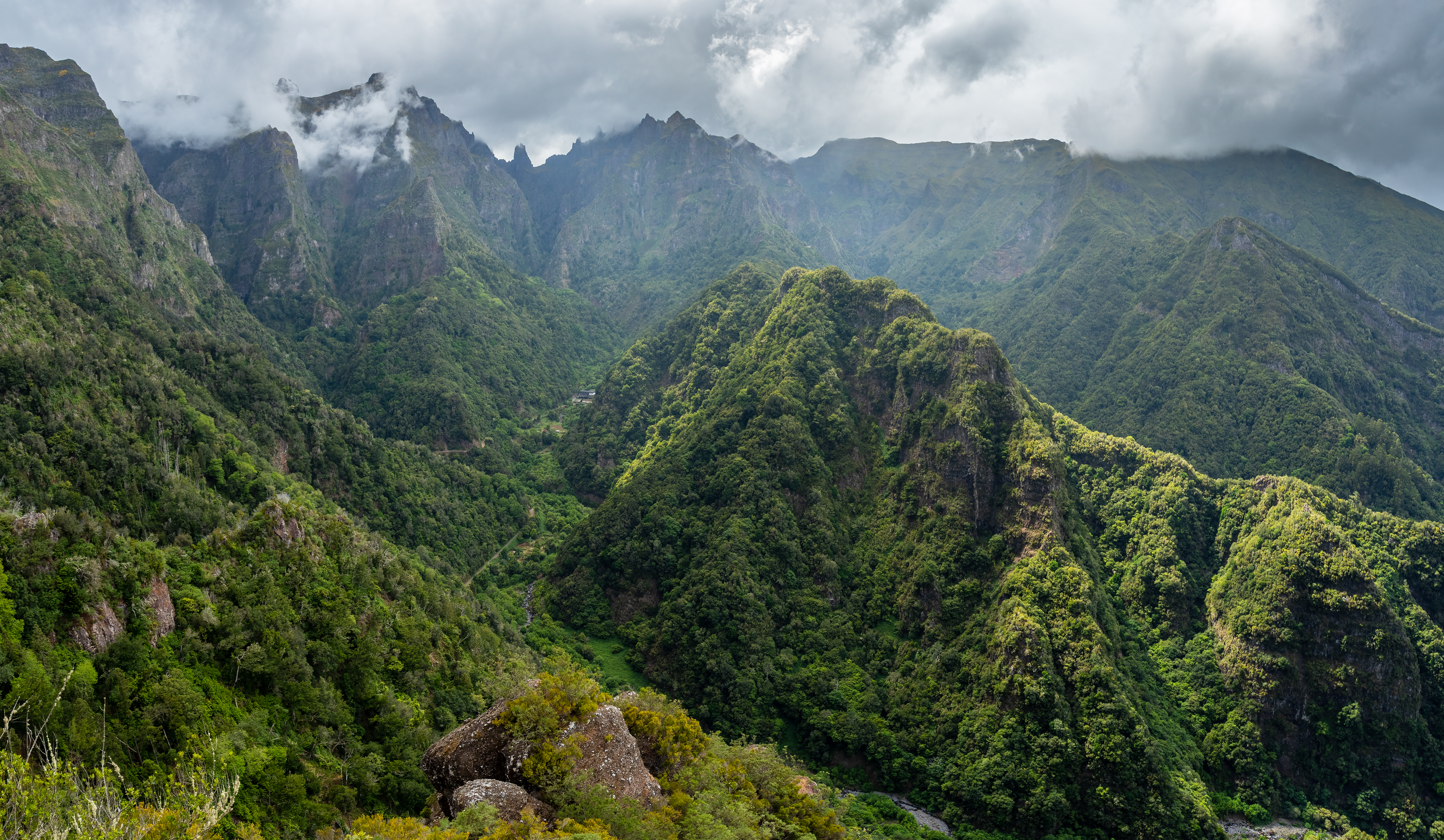
Sights from Balcões showing Madeira's high orography

The ten tallest peaks in Madeira exemplify the island's diverse topography. Pico Ruivo is the highest at 1,862 metres (6,109 ft). Madeira's mountaintops offer vistas of rugged terrain and the Atlantic Ocean and attract hikers and nature enthusiasts.

Rank	Peak Name	m	ft
1.	Pico Ruivo	1862	6109
2.	Pico das Torres	1847	6060
3.	Pico do Areeiro	1818	5965
4.	Pico do Cidrão	1801	5909
5.	Pico do Gato	1780	5840
6.	Pico Grande	1655	5430
7.	Pico Ruivo do Paul da Serra	1649	5410
8.	Queimadas	1500	4921
9.	Pico do Serradinho	1436	4711
10.	Chao dos Terreiros	1436	4711

==== Madeira Island ====
Seamounts of the Northeastern Atlantic between Madeira and continental Portugal with the Madeira archipelago on the bottom left corner

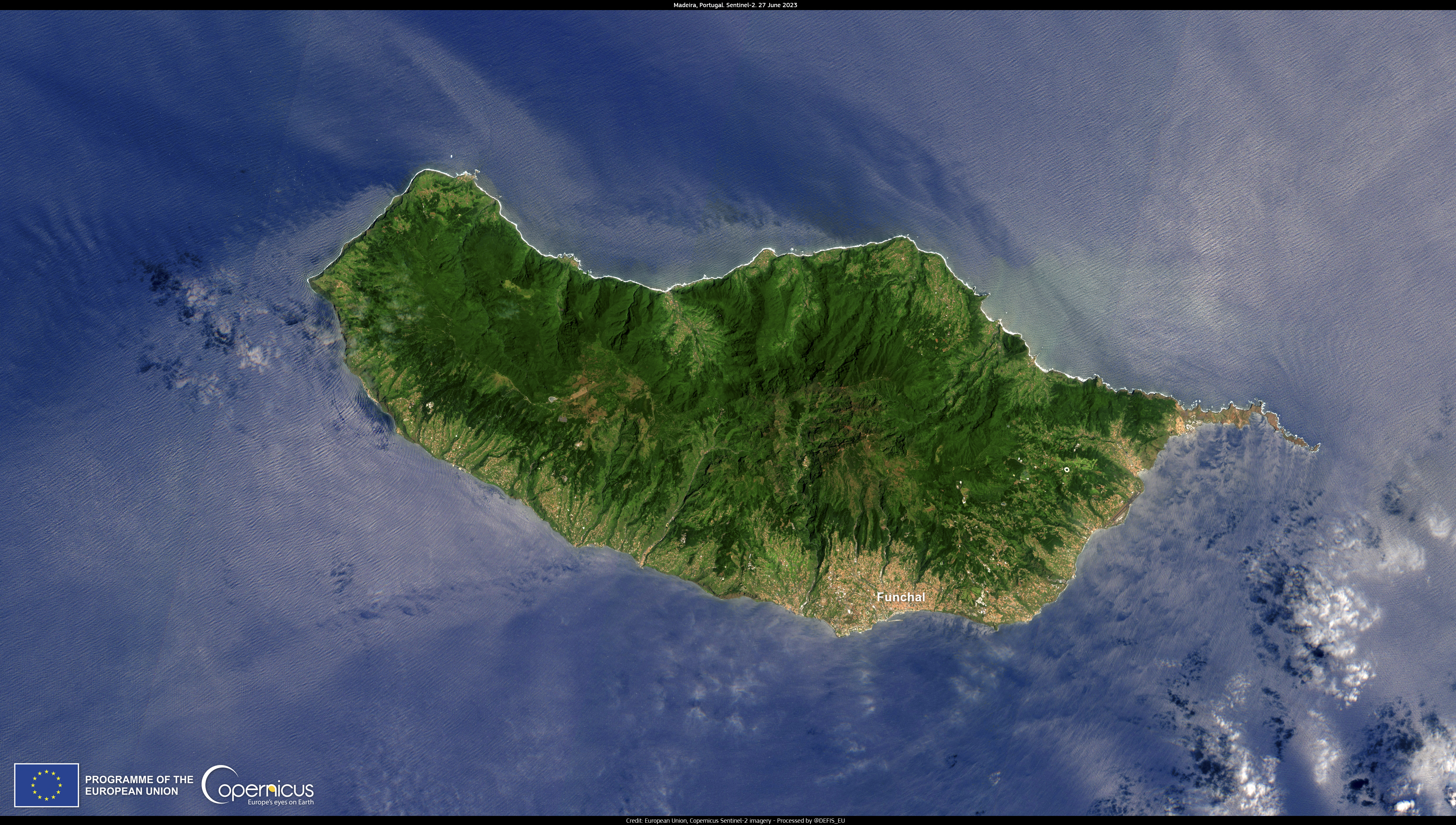
Satellite view of the island of Madeira by the Copernicus Sentinel-2 satellite. The image shows that deep green laurel forest (laurissilva) survives intact on the steep northern slopes of the island, but in the south, where terrain is gentler, the terracotta colour of towns and the light green colour of agriculture are more dominant.

Madeira Island is at the top of a massive shield volcano that rises about 6 km (20,000 ft) from the floor of the Atlantic Ocean, on the Tore underwater mountain range. The volcano formed atop an east–west rift in the oceanic crust along the African Plate, beginning during the Miocene epoch (5 million years ago), continuing into the Pleistocene (700,000 years ago). This was followed by extensive erosion, producing two large amphitheatres opening southward in the central part of the island. Volcanic activity later resumed, producing scoria cones and lava flows atop the eroded shield. The most recent volcanic eruptions were on the west-central part of the island 6,500 years ago, creating more cinder cones and lava flows.

It is the largest island of the group with an area of 741 km^{2} (286 sq mi), a length of 57 km (35 mi) (from Ponte de São Lourenço to Ponta do Pargo). It is approximately 22 km (14 mi) at its widest point (from Ponta da Cruz to Ponta de São Jorge), with a coastline of 150 km (90 mi). It has a mountain ridge that extends along the centre of the island, reaching 1,862 metres (6,109 feet) at its highest point (Pico Ruivo), staying below 200 metres along its eastern extent. The primitive volcanic foci responsible for the central mountainous area consisted of the peaks: Ruivo (1,862 m), Torres (1,851 m), Arieiro (1,818 m), Cidrão (1,802 m), Cedro (1,759 m), Casado (1,725 m), Grande (1,657 m), Ferreiro (1,582 m). At the end of this eruptive phase, reefs encircled the island, and its marine vestiges are evident in a calcareous layer at Lameiros, in São Vicente. Sea cliffs, such as Cabo Girão, valleys and ravines extend from this central spine, leaving the interior generally inaccessible. Daily life is concentrated in the many villages at the mouths of the ravines, through which the heavy autumn and winter rains travel to the sea.

=== Climate ===
Madeira has many different bioclimates. Based on differences in sun exposure, humidity, and annual mean temperature, clear variations distinguish north- and south-facing regions, as well as some islands. The islands are strongly influenced by the Gulf Stream and Canary Current, giving it mild to warm year-round temperatures. According to the Instituto de Meteorologia (IPMA), the average annual temperature at Funchal weather station is 19.6 °C (67.3 °F) for the 1981–2010 period. Relief is a determinant factor on precipitation levels; areas such as the Madeira Natural Park can get as much as 2,800 mm (110 in) of precipitation a year. Madeira hosts lush laurel forests, while Porto Santo, a much flatter island, has a semiarid climate (BSh). In most winters, snowfall occurs in the mountains.

Climate data for Funchal Observatory, 1991–2020 normals, altitude: 58 m (190 ft)
Month	Jan	Feb	Mar	Apr	May	Jun	Jul	Aug	Sep	Oct	Nov	Dec	Year
Record high °C (°F)	25.6 (78.1)	28.6 (83.5)	30.5 (86.9)	32.6 (90.7)	34.2 (93.6)	33.9 (93.0)	37.7 (99.9)	38.2 (100.8)	34.3 (93.7)	34.3 (93.7)	29.5 (85.1)	27.1 (80.8)	38.2 (100.8)
Mean daily maximum °C (°F)	20.0 (68.0)	19.9 (67.8)	20.6 (69.1)	21.0 (69.8)	22.0 (71.6)	23.7 (74.7)	25.4 (77.7)	26.8 (80.2)	26.6 (79.9)	25.2 (77.4)	22.8 (73.0)	21.0 (69.8)	22.9 (73.2)
Daily mean °C (°F)	17.1 (62.8)	16.8 (62.2)	17.4 (63.3)	17.9 (64.2)	19.1 (66.4)	20.9 (69.6)	22.6 (72.7)	23.7 (74.7)	23.5 (74.3)	22.2 (72.0)	19.9 (67.8)	18.3 (64.9)	20.0 (67.9)
Mean daily minimum °C (°F)	14.3 (57.7)	13.9 (57.0)	14.3 (57.7)	14.9 (58.8)	16.2 (61.2)	18.2 (64.8)	19.7 (67.5)	20.7 (69.3)	20.4 (68.7)	19.2 (66.6)	17.0 (62.6)	15.5 (59.9)	17.0 (62.7)
Record low °C (°F)	9.2 (48.6)	8.7 (47.7)	8.5 (47.3)	11.1 (52.0)	9.7 (49.5)	14.5 (58.1)	16.3 (61.3)	17.5 (63.5)	17.9 (64.2)	13.5 (56.3)	11.2 (52.2)	11.0 (51.8)	8.5 (47.3)
Average precipitation mm (inches)	67.1 (2.64)	72.4 (2.85)	62.3 (2.45)	45.2 (1.78)	27.2 (1.07)	7.8 (0.31)	1.7 (0.07)	1.3 (0.05)	23.1 (0.91)	91.2 (3.59)	80.3 (3.16)	94.8 (3.73)	574.4 (22.61)
Average rainy days (≥ 1 mm)	6.2	5.5	5.8	4.7	3.3	1.0	0.3	0.4	3.1	7.0	7.3	8.6	53.2
Average relative humidity (%)	71	70	68	68	70	73	73	72	71	71	70	70	71
Mean monthly sunshine hours	160.9	166.8	197.7	194.8	208.6	194.0	232.5	236.7	210.8	194.3	165.9	151.1	2,314.1
Percentage possible sunshine	50	54	53	50	48	45	55	57	57	55	53	49	52
Average ultraviolet index	4.0	5.9	8.0	9.7	10.4	11.0	10.8	10.1	8.6	7.2	4.7	3.4	7.8
Source 1: Instituto Português do Mar e da Atmosfera (average daily max UV recorded in 2015-2020)
Source 2: NOAA (humidity 1961–1990), German Meteorological Service (sunshine 1991-2020)

=== Biodiversity ===
==== Endemic plant and animal species ====
In the south, little is left of the indigenous subtropical rainforest that once covered the island (the original settlers set fires to clear the land for farming) and named it (madeira means "wood" in Portuguese). However, in the north, the valleys harbor native trees. These laurisilva forests, notably those on the northern slopes, are designated as a UNESCO World Heritage Site. Madeira's paleobotanical record reveals that laurissilva forest has existed for at least 1.8 million years. Critically endangered species such as the vine Jasminum azoricum and the rowan Sorbus maderensis are endemic. The Madeiran large white butterfly was an endemic subspecies of the large white that inhabited the laurissilva forests but has not been seen since 1977.

==== Madeiran wall lizard ====
The Madeiran wall lizard (Teira dugesii), being the only species in the genus Teira, is a species of lizard in the family Lacertidae with four recognized subspecies. The species is endemic to the Madeira Archipelago, Portugal. In the Azores, this lizard has become naturalized after an involuntary introduction by the shipping trade between the two archipelagos. The species is both endemic and common, ranging from sea coasts to altitudes of 1,850 metres (6,070 ft).

==== Madeiran wolf spider ====
Hogna ingens, the Deserta Grande wolf spider, is endemic to the Madeira archipelago, specifically Deserta Grande Island. It is critically endangered. It is considered the largest member of its family. Restoration efforts are underway.

==== Birds ====
Three species of birds are endemic to Madeira: the Trocaz pigeon, the Madeira chaffinch and the Madeira firecrest. In addition extinct species include the Madeiran scops owl, two rail species, Rallus adolfocaesaris and R. lowei, and two quail species, Coturnix lignorum and C. alabrevis, and the Madeiran wood pigeon, a subspecies of the common wood pigeon and which was last seen in the 20th century.

A great auk bone is known from the Selvagens, suggesting this seabird visited at least sporadically.

==== Mice ====
Madeira is home to six distinct chromosomal varieties of house mice, believed to be descendants of common European house mice brought to the island by Vikings in the 9th century (or conceivably by 15th-century Portuguese settlers), but diversified to the point where at least some likely cannot interbreed with their continental relatives or with one another. They have essentially the same genes, but rearranged to give different chromosome numbers: the ancestral species has 40 chromosomes, whereas the Madeira populations have from 22 to 30. The deep valleys of Madeira are separated by high ground, and the different lineages of mice do not encounter each other.

=== Levadas ===
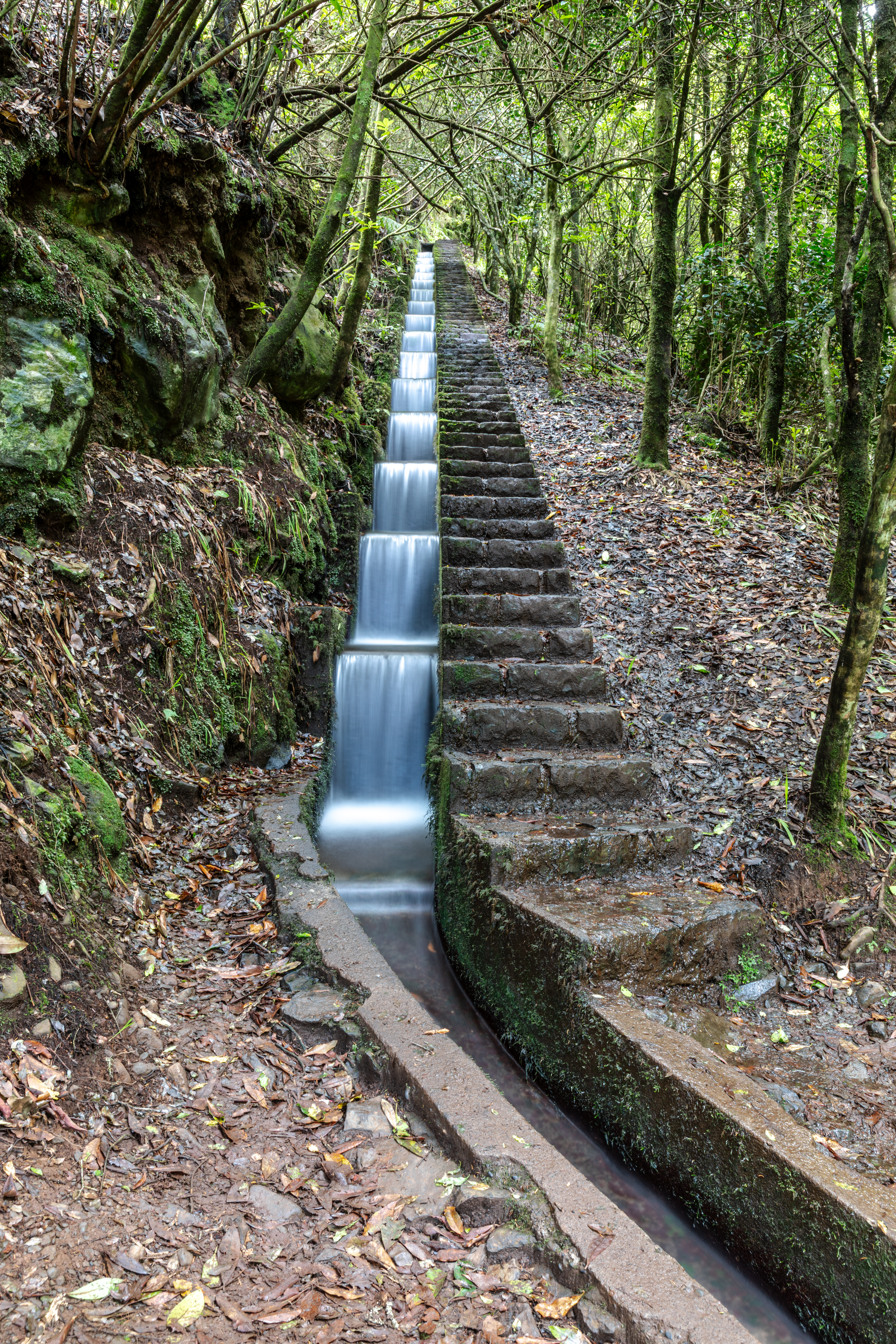
Levada to the trout farm (Viveiros de Trutas), Ribeiro Frio, São Roque do Faial

A levada is an irrigation channel or aqueduct specific to the Portuguese Atlantic region of Madeira. Madeira island is wet in the northwest, but dry in the southeast. In the 16th century the Portuguese started building levadas (aqueducts) to carry water to the agricultural regions in the south. Due to the island's mountainous landscape, building levadas promised to be a difficult venture, often tasked to criminals and convicts from continental Portugal. Many are cut into the mountainsides, accompanied by 40 km (25 mi) of tunnels, some of which are still accessible.

Today levadas supply water and also provide hydro-electric power. Over 2,170 km (1,350 mi) of levadas were built and later provided a network of walking paths. Paths can provide easy and relaxing walks through the countryside, while others are narrow, crumbling ledges where a slip could result in injury or death. Some improvements have been made to these pathways following the 2010 Madeira floods and mudslides. Such improvements involved the continuous maintenance of streams, paving trails, and establishing safety fences on dangerous stretches.

== Government and politics ==
=== Political autonomy ===
Due to its distinct geography, economy, social and cultural situation, and the historical autonomous aspirations of its population, the Autonomous Region of Madeira was established in 1976. Although it is a politico-administrative autonomous region, the Portuguese constitution specifies both a regional and national connection, obliging their administrations to maintain democratic principles and promote regional interests, while reinforcing national unity.

As defined by the Portuguese constitution and other laws, Madeira has its own political and administrative statute and government. The branches of Government are the Regional Government and the Legislative Assembly, the latter elected by universal suffrage, using the D'Hondt method of proportional representation.

The Representative of the Republic appoints the president of the Regional Government according to the results of the election to the legislative assemblies.

The sovereignty of the Portuguese Republic is represented in Madeira by the Representative of the Republic, appointed by the President of the Republic on the advice of the Government of the Republic. The tasks of the Representative of the Republic are to sign and order the publication of regional legislative decrees and regional regulatory decrees or to exercise the right of veto over regional laws, should these laws be unconstitutional. Before the sixth amendment to the Portuguese Constitution passed in 2006, this responsibility was held by a more powerful Minister of the Republic, who was proposed by the Government and appointed by the President.

=== Status within the European Union ===
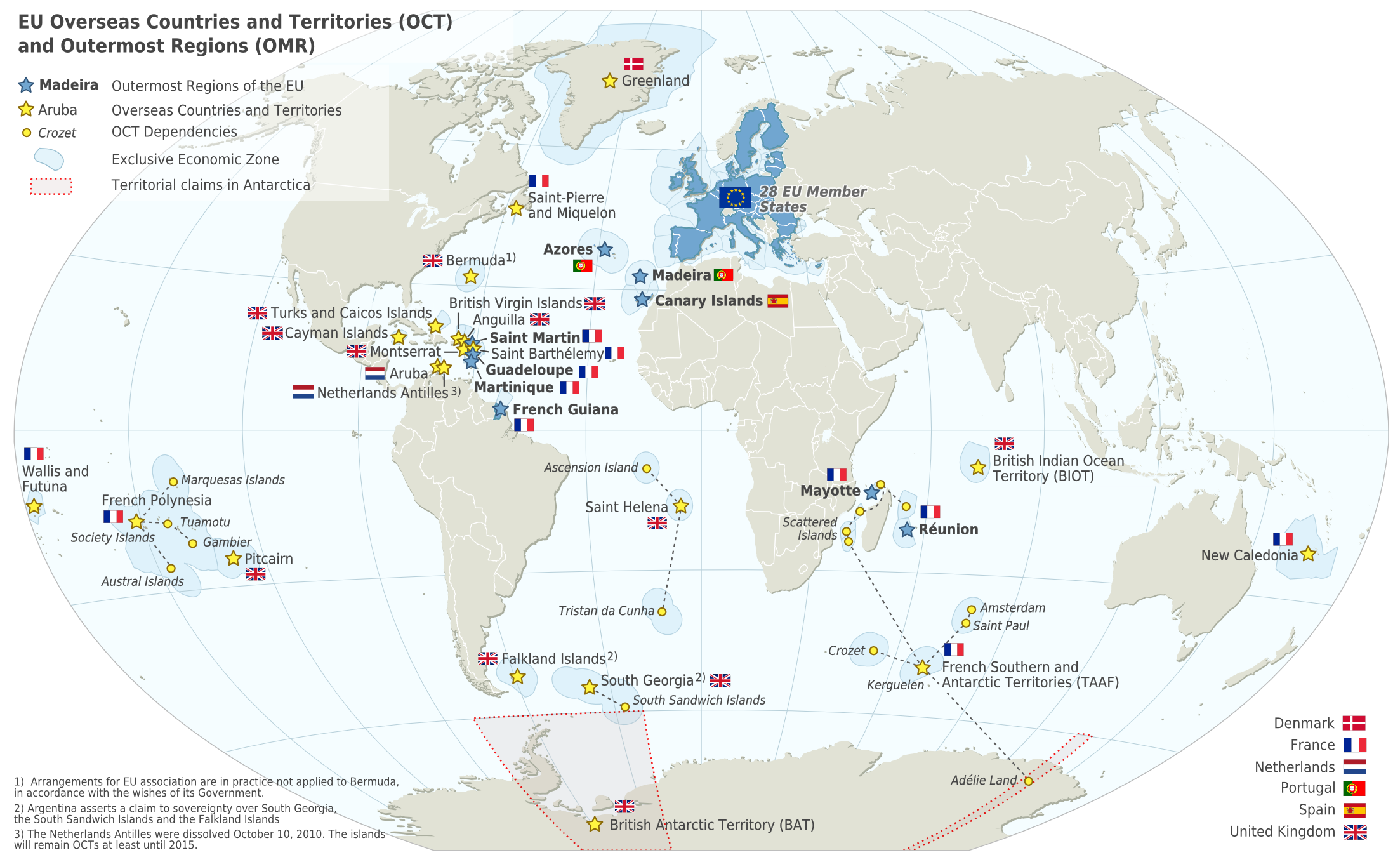
Map of the pre-Brexit European Union in the world, with overseas countries and territories (OCT) and outermost regions (OMR) for which Madeira is included

Madeira is an Outermost Region (OMR) of the European Union, meaning that due to its geographical situation, it is entitled to derogation from some EU policies.

According to the Treaty on the Functioning of the European Union, both primary and secondary European Union law applies to Madeira, with possible derogations to take account of its "structural social and economic situation (...) which is compounded by their remoteness, insularity, small size, difficult topography and climate, economic dependence on a few products, the permanence and combination of which severely restrain their development". An example of such derogation is seen in the approval of the International Business Centre of Madeira and other state aid policies to help the rum industry.

It forms part of the European Union customs area, the Schengen Area and the European Union Value Added Tax Area.

=== Foreign relations and defence ===
Foreign affairs and defence are the responsibility of the national government. The Madeira Military Zone is the Portuguese Army's command for ground forces stationed in the islands, centred on the 3rd Garrison Regiment based at Funchal. The Navy tasks the patrol vessels Tejo and Mondego specifically to Madeira, as well as other vessels as required, to patrol Portugal's large economic zone. To support search and rescue, the Portuguese Air Force maintains a staging base on Porto Santo Island incorporating detachments of C-295 aircraft and Merlin helicopters.

=== Administrative divisions ===
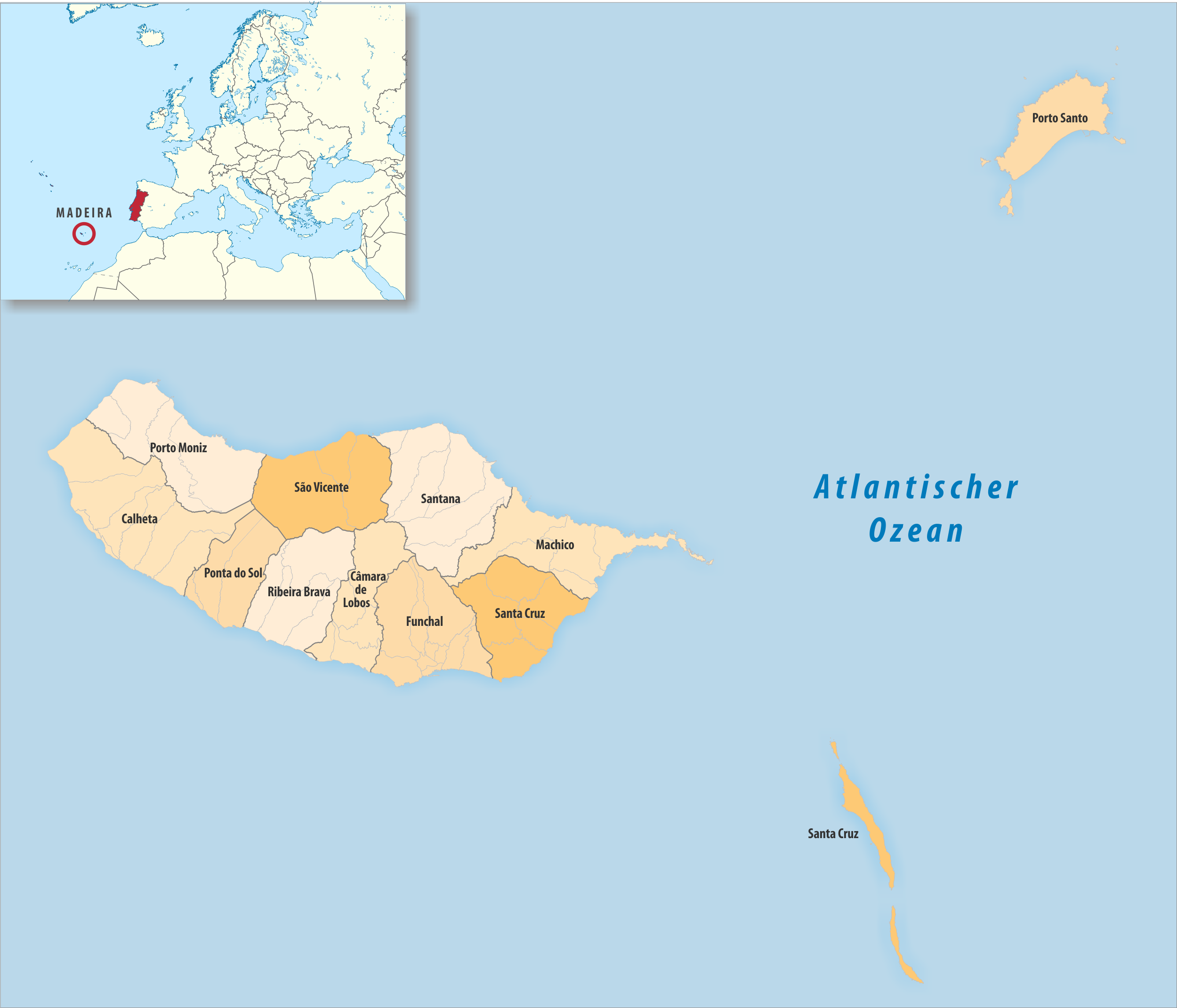
Municipalities of Madeira

Administratively, Madeira is divided into eleven municipalities and fifty four freguesias:

Municipality	Population (2011)	Area	Main settlement	Parishes
Funchal	111,892	75.7 km^{2} (29.2 sq mi)	Funchal	10
Santa Cruz	43,005	68.0 km^{2} (26.3 sq mi)	Santa Cruz	5
Câmara de Lobos	35,666	52.6 km^{2} (20.3 sq mi)	Câmara de Lobos	5
Machico	21,828	67.6 km^{2} (26.1 sq mi)	Machico	5
Ribeira Brava	13,375	64.9 km^{2} (25.1 sq mi)	Ribeira Brava	4
Calheta	11,521	110.3 km^{2} (42.6 sq mi)	Calheta	8
Ponta do Sol	8,862	46.8 km^{2} (18.1 sq mi)	Ponta do Sol	3
Santana	7,719	93.1 km^{2} (35.9 sq mi)	Santana	6
São Vicente	5,723	80.8 km^{2} (31.2 sq mi)	São Vicente	3
Porto Santo	5,483	42.4 km^{2} (16.4 sq mi)	Vila Baleira	1
Porto Moniz	2,711	82.6 km^{2} (31.9 sq mi)	Porto Moniz	4

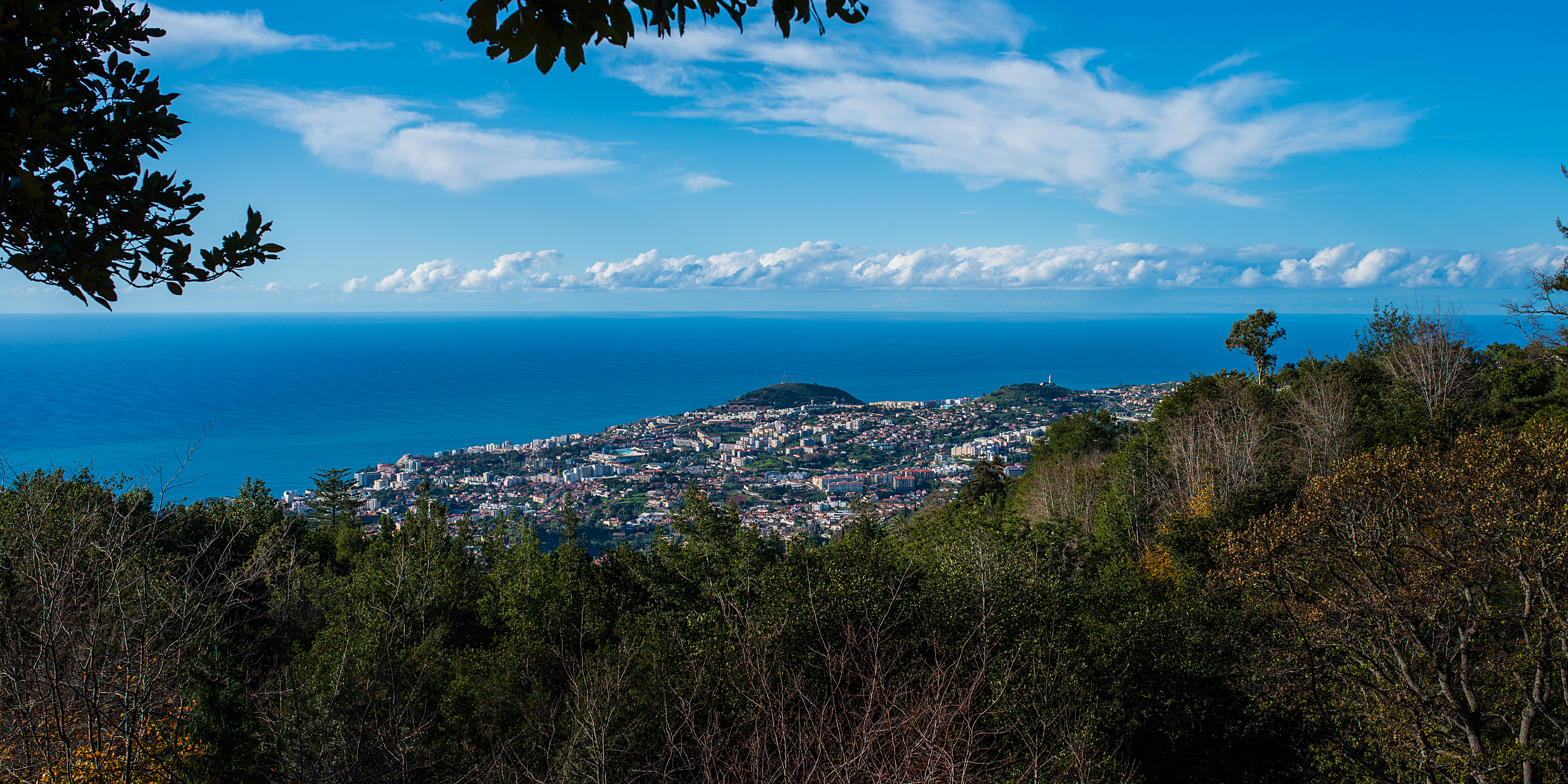
Partial view of the capital as seen from the mountains above it

=== Funchal ===
Funchal (Portuguese pronunciation: [fũˈʃal]), officially the City of Funchal (Portuguese: Cidade do Funchal), is the capital, largest city and a municipality in Portugal's Autonomous Region of Madeira, bordered by the Atlantic Ocean. The city has a population of 105,795, making it the sixth largest city in Portugal. Because of its high cultural and historical value, Funchal is one of Portugal's main tourist attractions; it is also popular as a destination for New Year's Eve, and it is the leading Portuguese port on cruise liner dockings.

=== Sister Jurisdictions ===
Madeira Island has the following sister jurisdictions:

Aosta Valley, Italy (1987)
Jersey (1998)
Eastern Cape, South Africa
Jeju Province, South Korea (2007)
Gibraltar (2009)

== Demographics ==
The island was settled by Portuguese people, especially farmers from the Minho region, meaning that Madeirans (Portuguese: Madeirenses), as they are called, are ethnically Portuguese, though they have developed a distinct regional identity and cultural traits.

In 2023, 94.5% of the population of Madeira were born in Portugal; the total Madeiran population was 256,622.

=== Diaspora ===
Madeirans migrated to the United States, South Africa, Venezuela, Brazil, Guyana, Saint Vincent and the Grenadines, Curaçao and Trinidad and Tobago. Madeiran immigrants in North America mostly clustered in New England and mid-Atlantic states, Toronto, Northern California, and Hawaii. The city of New Bedford is especially rich in Madeirans, and it hosts the Museum of Madeira Heritage. The city's annual Feast of the Blessed Sacrament, initiated in 1915 by four immigrants from Madeira, is the world's largest celebration of Luso-American heritage, regularly drawing crowds of tens of thousands to New Bedfor's Madeira Field.

In the late 1830s, Robert Reid Kalley, a Scottish Presbyterian missionary who had been bound for China, began preaching the Protestant gospel and converting islanders from Catholicism. In 1846, 1,000 Protestant Madeirenses, facing a concerted backlash from the authorities and their Catholic neighbours, chose to answer a call for sugar plantation workers in Trinidad and elsewhere in the West Indies. By 1848, most had moved on to more hospitable reception in Sangamon and Morgan counties in Illinois where an American missionary society had purchased land on their behalf.

Several large Madeiran communities continue around the world, including in the UK and Jersey. The Portuguese British community on Jersey, made up mostly of Madeirans, celebrates Madeira Day annually on 1 July, marking both the anniversary of Portugal's grant of autonomy to the island in 1976 and the arrival of Portuguese explorers in Machico Bay in 1419.

In Venezuela the Madeiran Portuguese settled in cities such as Caracas and rural areas of the interior. According to figures from the 1990s, around 70% of the Portuguese diaspora in that country was made up of Madeirans and their descendants, initially dedicated to activities such as agriculture, but later, due to the lack of government support, the emigrants concentrated on commerce in the large Venezuelan cities. Among the companies founded by Madeirans are the supermarkets Central Madeirense, Excelsior Gama, Supermercados Unicasa, and Automercados Plaza, as well as many renowned bakeries.

Emigration to South Africa greatly increased in the decades following World War II. Madeiran immigrants, traditionally associated with horticulture and commerce, became the largest group within South Africa's Portuguese community, which was further enlarged by the collapse after the 1974 Carnation Revolution of Portuguese colonial rule in enighboring Angola and Mozambique. By the beginning of the 1990s and at the end of Apartheid, the number of people of Madeiran descent in South Africa was estimated to outweigh the 250,000 still on the island, generating significant remittances. Numbers have since diminished, with a stream of second, and third, generation South-African Madeirans choosing, over Brazil and other third country destinations, to "return" to the island.

=== Immigration ===
Madeira is part of the Schengen Area. In 2023, Madeira had a population of 256,622, of whom 14,060, or 5.5%, were foreign-born. The most common nationalities were Venezuelans (commonly of Portuguese origins) 1,182 (15.5%), the United Kingdom 1,451 (10.3%), Brazilians 1,450 (10.3%), Germans 1,410 (10.0%), Italians 738 (5.2%), Russians 593, Americans 452 and French 426.

Previously reaching 253,259 in 2022, of whom the majority are locals. But Madeira has witnessed a rising foreign population for many years. As of 31 December 2022, immigrants in the region totalled 11,793 people, an increase of 13.3% from 2021. "Nationals from Venezuela (19.7%), the United Kingdom (11.8%), Germany (9.4%) and Brazil (9.2%) continue to represent the main foreign communities in the region", according to the DREM (Madeira Statistics Department).

== Economy ==
The gross domestic product (GDP) reached nearly 7.5 billion euros in 2024, accounting for 2.6% of Portugal's economic output. GDP per capita was of 29,012 euros or 73% of the EU27 average. The GDP per employee was 71% of the EU average.

Madeira embraced Bitcoin by implementing policies that exempt Bitcoin investors from paying personal income taxes in the region. Madeira Regional Government President Miguel Albuquerque confirmed the launching of a business hub focused solely on Bitcoin and related innovations. Speaking in a dialogue with Prince Filip Karađorđević of Serbia at Bitcoin Amsterdam 2023, he framed the move as a significant step toward technological advancements and international partnerships.

=== Madeira International Business Center ===
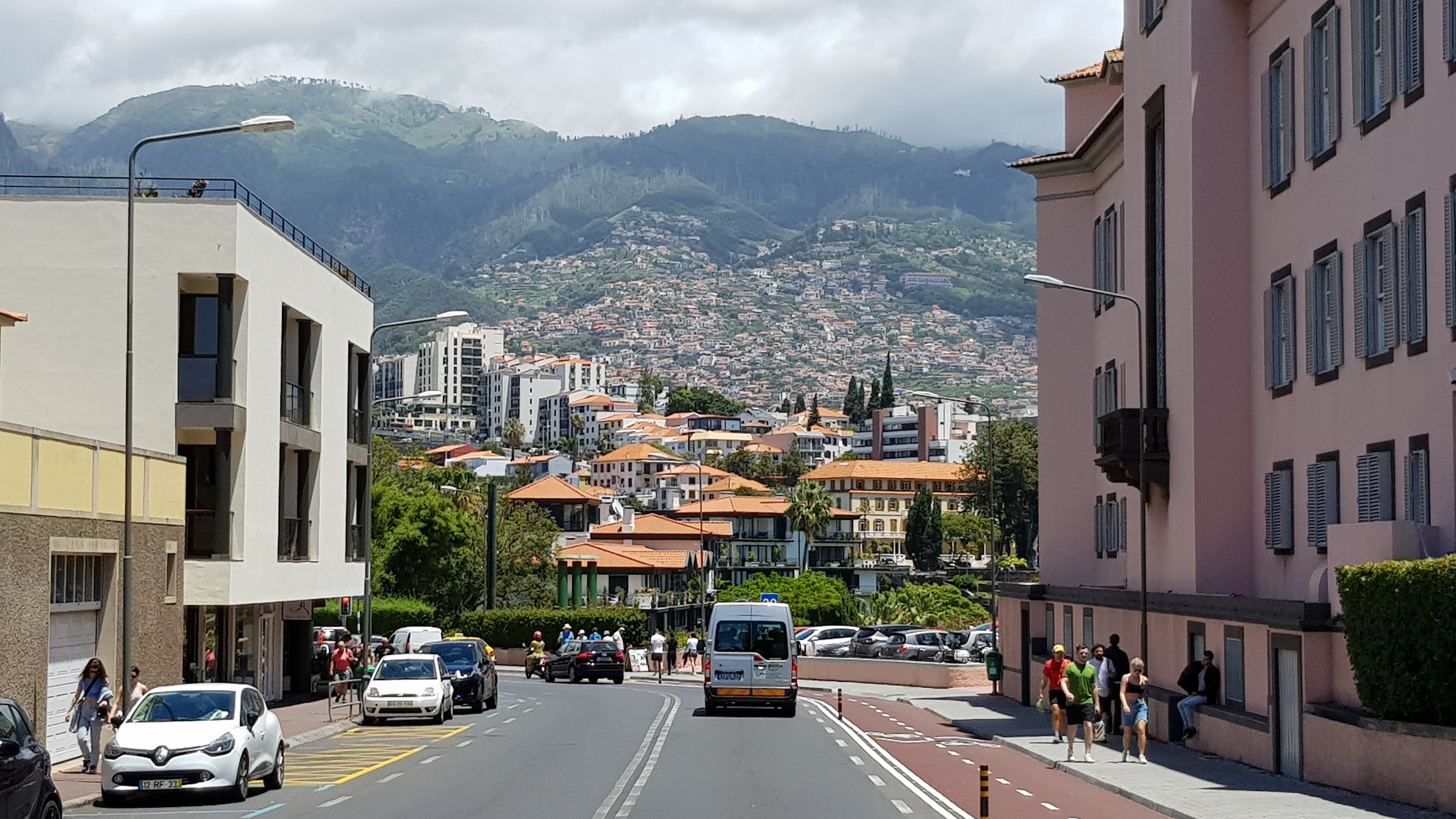
View of Madeiran mountains from Funchal

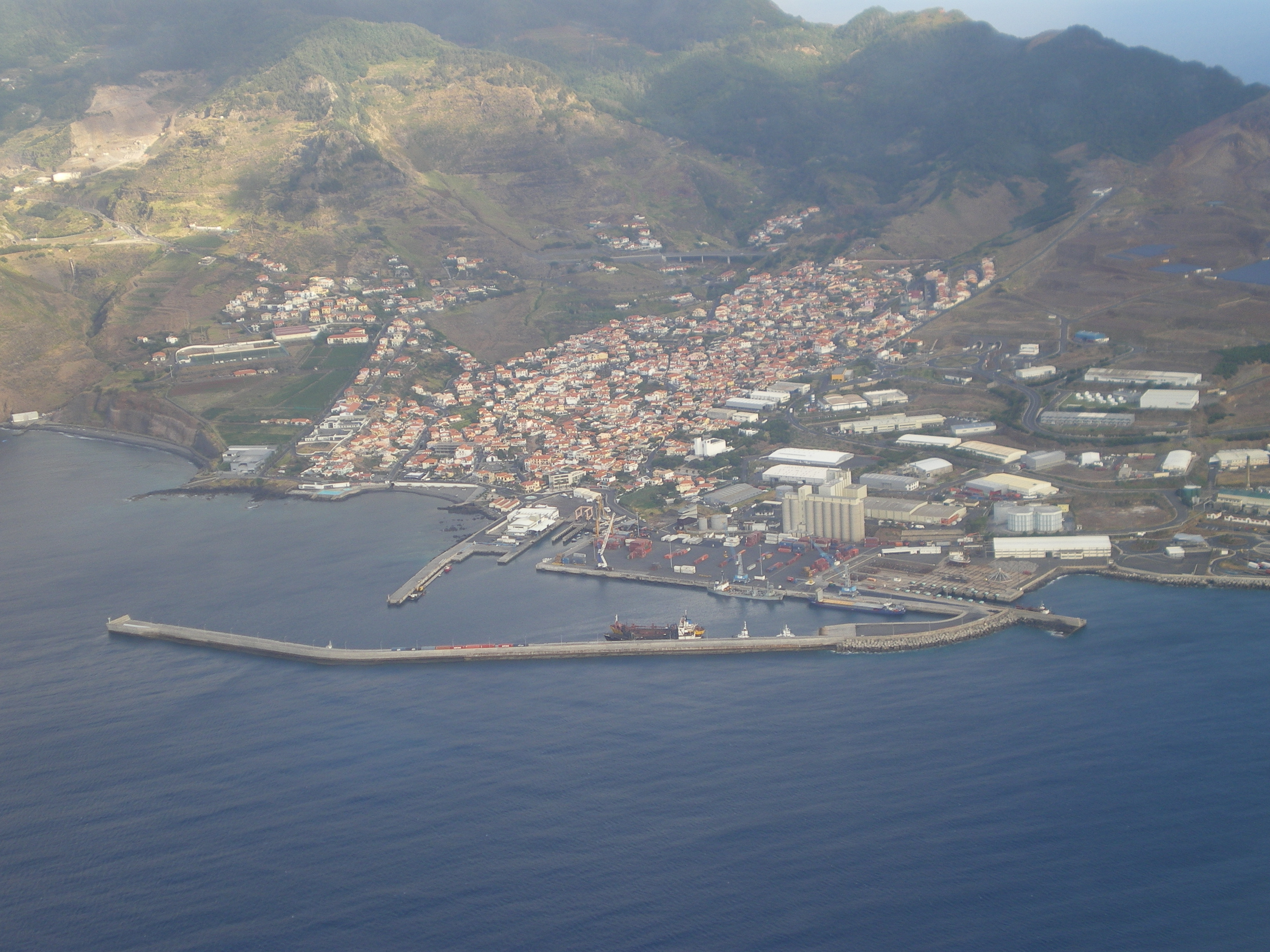
Caniçal on the left and Madeira Free Trade (Industrial) Zone on the right

The Madeira International Business Center (MIBC) free trade zone has led to additional infrastructure, production shops and essential services for small and medium-sized industrial enterprises. MIBC comprises three sectors of investment: the Industrial Free Trade Zone, the International Shipping Register – MAR and International Services. Madeira's tax regime has been approved by the European Commission as legal State Aid and its deadline was extended through 2027. MIBC was created formally in the 1980s as a tool of regional economic policy. It consists of (mainly tax) incentives, granted with the objective of attracting investment into Madeira.

Favorable operational and fiscal conditions were approved by the European Commission under Article 299 of the Treaty on European Union. The MIBC is integrated in the Portuguese and EU legal systems and is regulated and supervised by Portuguese and EU authorities in a transparent and stable business environment, clearly distinguished from so-called "tax havens" and "offshore jurisdictions". In 2015, the EC authorized a state aid regime for companies incorporated between 2015 and 2020 and extended the regime of tax reductions through 2027. The tax regime is outlined in Article 36°-A of the Portuguese Tax Incentives Statute. Available data demonstrates that this programme aided the local labor market, through the creation of qualified jobs and for professionals who have returned to Madeira; increased productivity; expanded business tourism from the visits of investors and their clients and suppliers, and other sectors such as real estate. Telecommunications and other services benefit from a larger client base. Companies attracted by MIBC represent over 40% of revenue in terms of corporate income tax for the Government of Madeira and nearly 3.000 jobs. Salaries there are above average in comparison with the wages paid in other sectors.

=== Regional government ===
Madeira has been a significant recipient of European Union funding, totaling €2 billion. In 2012, it was reported that despite a population of just 250,000, the local administration owed some €6 billion. The Portuguese treasury (IGCP) assumed Madeira's debt management between 2012 and 2015. The region works with the central government on a long-term plan to reduce debt levels and commercial debt stock. Moody's noted that the region made significant fiscal consolidation efforts and that its tax revenue collection has improved. Tax revenues increased by 41% between 2012 and 2016, helping the region to reduce its deficit to operating revenue ratio to 10% in 2016 from 77% in 2013.

=== Tourism ===
Pearl of the Atlantic, island of eternal spring... Madeira well deserves its fanciful nicknames and the affection visitors and locals alike feel for this tiny volcanic island that offers so much.

— Lonely Planet

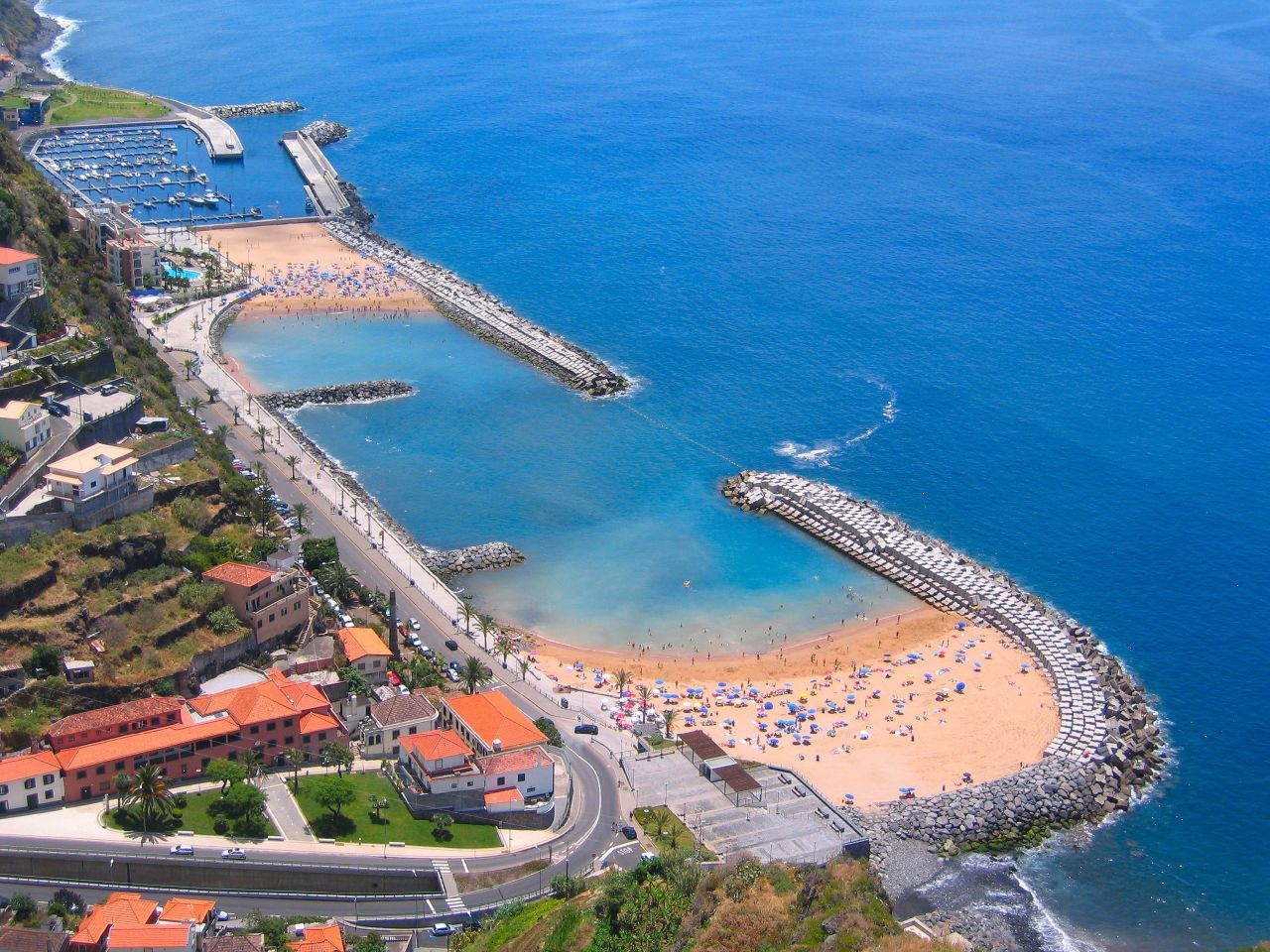
Calheta Beach

Tourism is an important sector in the region's economy, contributing 20% to the region's GDP, providing support throughout the year for commercial, transport and other activities and constituting a significant market for local products. The share in Gross Value Added of hotels and restaurants (9%) also highlights this phenomenon. The island of Porto Santo, with its 9-kilometre-long (5.6 mi) beach and its climate, is entirely devoted to tourism.

Visitors are mainly from Europe, with Portuguese, British, German and French tourists providing the main contingents (2021). The average annual occupancy rate was 60.3% in 2008, reaching its maximum in March and April, when it exceeds 70%.

==== Whale watching ====
Whale watching has become very popular in recent years. Many species of dolphins, such as common dolphin, Atlantic spotted dolphin, striped dolphin, bottlenose dolphin, short-finned pilot whale, and whales such as Bryde's whale, sei whale, fin whale, sperm whale, and beaked whales can be spotted near the coast or offshore.

=== Sustainable development ===
Electricity on Madeira is provided solely through EEM (Empresa de Electricidade da Madeira, SA, which holds a monopoly for the provision of electrical supply on the autonomous region) and consists largely of fossil fuels, but with a significant supply of seasonal hydroelectricity from the levada system, wind power and a small amount of solar. Energy production comes from conventional thermal and hydropower, as well as wind and solar energy. The Ribeira dos Soccoridos hydropower plant, rated at 15MW, utilises a pumped hydropower reservoir to recycle mountain water during the dry summer.

Battery technologies are being tested to minimise Madeira's reliance on fossil fuel imports. Renault SA and EEM piloted the Sustainable Porto Santo—Smart Fossil Free Island project on Porto Santo to demonstrate how fossil fuels can be entirely replaced with renewable energy, using a 3.3 MWh battery. Madeira operates a 15 MW 1-hour lithium iron phosphate battery with black start capability.

In the first half of 2022, 33% of the electricity consumed on the Portuguese archipelago of Madeira was sourced from renewable energy, a milestone achieved through a collaborative initiative co-funded by the European Union (EU).

Central to this accomplishment are the centuries-old stone pipes known as levadas, spanning thousands of kilometers and dating back to the fifteenth century. These levadas efficiently transport rainwater from northern regions to the south, serving various purposes such as human consumption, agriculture, and electricity production.

The Socorridos hydroelectric power station, fueled by water conveyed through the levadas, stands as the island's principal hydraulic system, providing power consistently throughout the year. A significant aspect of the EU-funded multi-million euro project involved enhancing water storage capacity, including the construction of a 5.4-kilometer tunnel and additional mountain tunnels, presenting formidable engineering challenges.

Wind power complements the system, facilitating the movement of stored water uphill during peak demand periods. The treated water serves dual purposes—human consumption and agriculture—while also functioning as a renewable energy source. Nuno Jorge Pereira, Water Production Director for Wood, Water, and Waste (ARM), elucidates the strategic use of water volumes to adapt to energy production levels.

This €34.7 million project, with €17.3 million co-financed by the European Cohesion Policy, not only mitigates concerns about drought but also earned acclaim as one of the best EU co-funded projects in the EGIOSTAR Awards.

The optimized Socorridos plant has notably alleviated water-related challenges for local farmers.

=== Transport ===
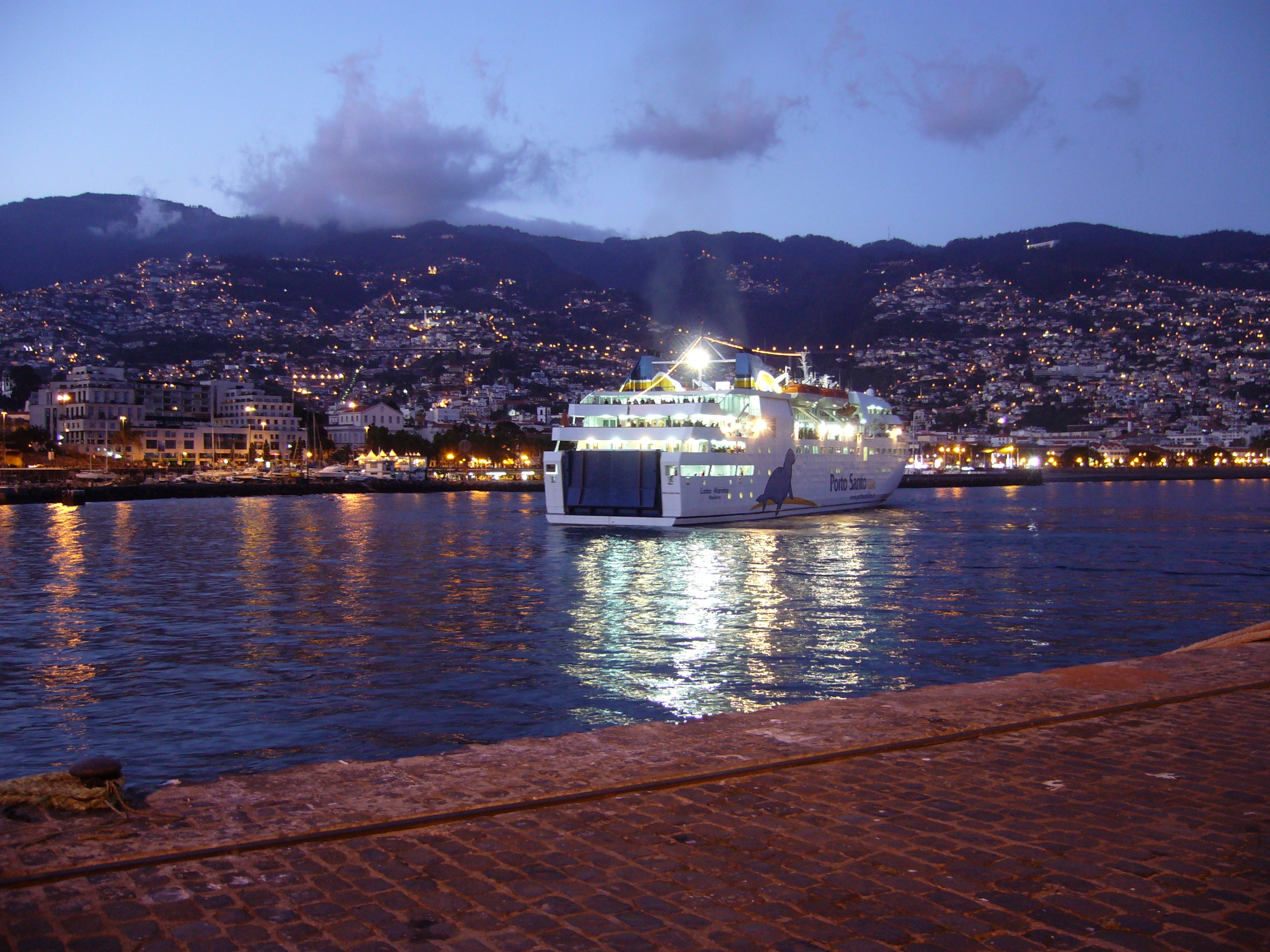
A ferry makes daily trips between Madeira and Porto Santo.

The islands have two airports, Cristiano Ronaldo International Airport and Porto Santo Airport, on the islands of Madeira and Porto Santo respectively. From Cristiano Ronaldo International Airport the most frequent flights are to Lisbon. There are also direct flights to over 30 other airports in Europe and nearby islands.

Transport between the two main islands is by plane, or ferries from the Porto Santo Line, the latter also carrying vehicles. Visiting the interior of the islands is now easy thanks to construction of the Vias Rápidas, major roads that cross the island. Modern roads reach all points of interest on the islands.

Funchal has an extensive public transportation system. Bus companies, including Horários do Funchal, which has been operating for over a hundred years, have regularly scheduled routes to all points of interest on the island.

== Culture ==
=== Music ===
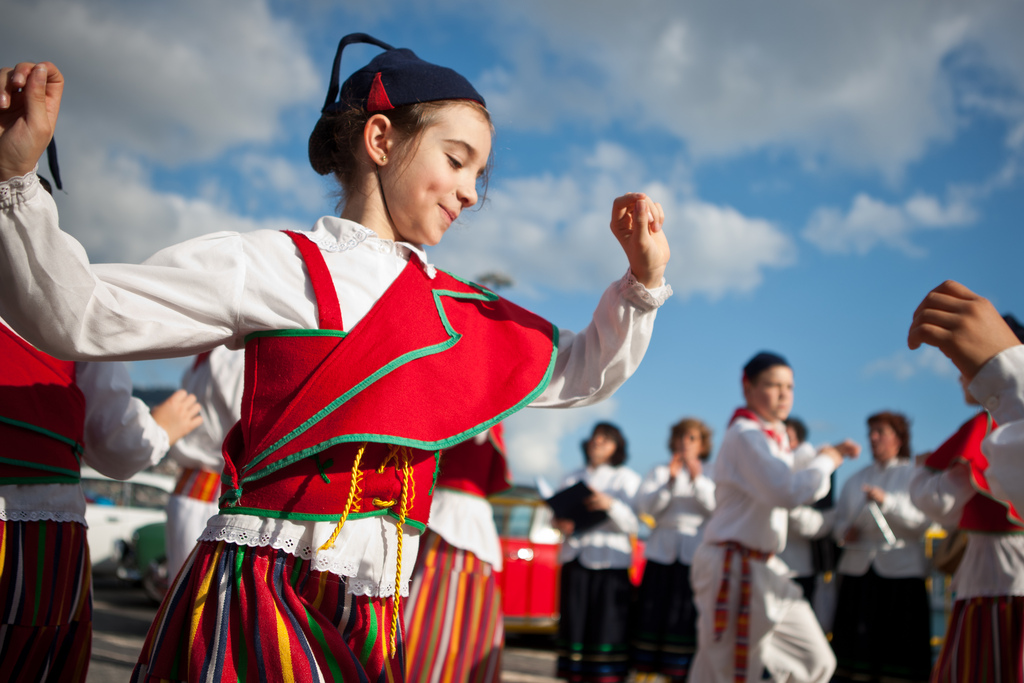
Bailinho da Madeira

Folklore music in Madeira is widespread and mainly uses local musical instruments such as the machete, rajão, brinquinho and cavaquinho, which are used in traditional folkloric dances like the bailinho da Madeira.

Emigrants from Madeira also influenced the creation of new musical instruments. In the 1880s, the ukulele was created, based on two small guitar-like instruments of Madeiran origin, the cavaquinho and the rajão. The ukulele was introduced to the Hawaiian Islands by Portuguese immigrants from Madeira and Cape Verde. Three immigrants in particular, Madeiran cabinet makers Manuel Nunes, José do Espírito Santo, and Augusto Dias, are generally credited as the first ukulele makers. Two weeks after they disembarked from the SS Ravenscrag in late August 1879, the Hawaiian Gazette reported that "Madeira Islanders recently arrived here, have been delighting the people with nightly street concerts." The Madeiran band NAPA reached global success with the song Deslocado, representing Portugal in the Eurovision Song Contest 2025, qualifying ninth in the first semi-final with 56 points, and finishing 21st in the grand final with 50 points.

=== Cuisine ===
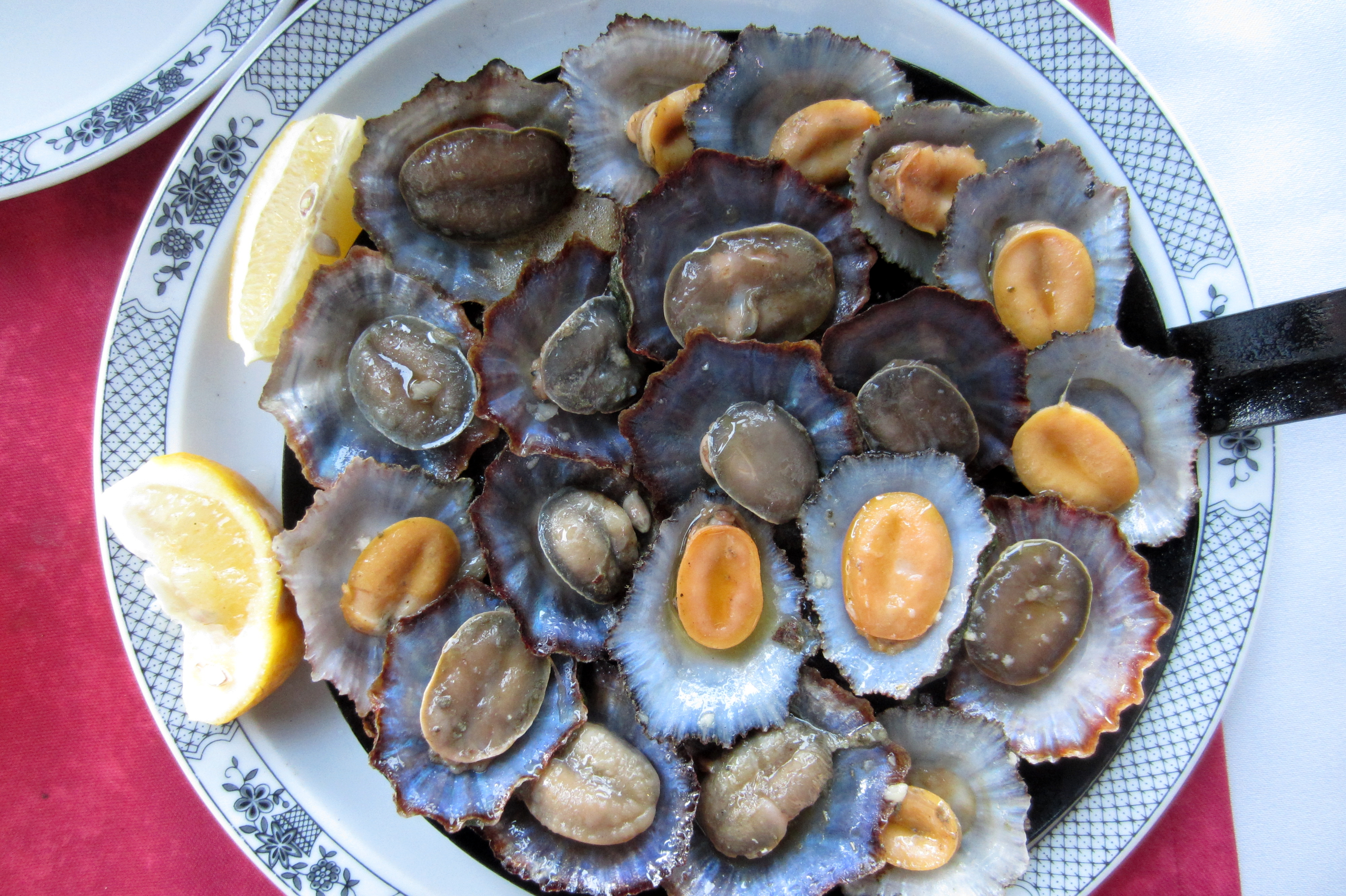
"Lapas", the true limpet species Patella vulgata

Because of the geographic situation of Madeira in the Atlantic Ocean, the island has an abundance of fish of various kinds. The species that are consumed the most are espada (black scabbardfish), blue fin tuna, swordfish, white marlin, blue marlin, albacore, bigeye tuna, wahoo, spearfish, skipjack tuna and many others are found in the local dishes as they are found along the coast of Madeira. Espada is usually fried in a batter and accompanied by fried banana (Espada com banana) and sometimes a passionfruit sauce. Bacalhau is also popular, as it is in Mainland Portugal.

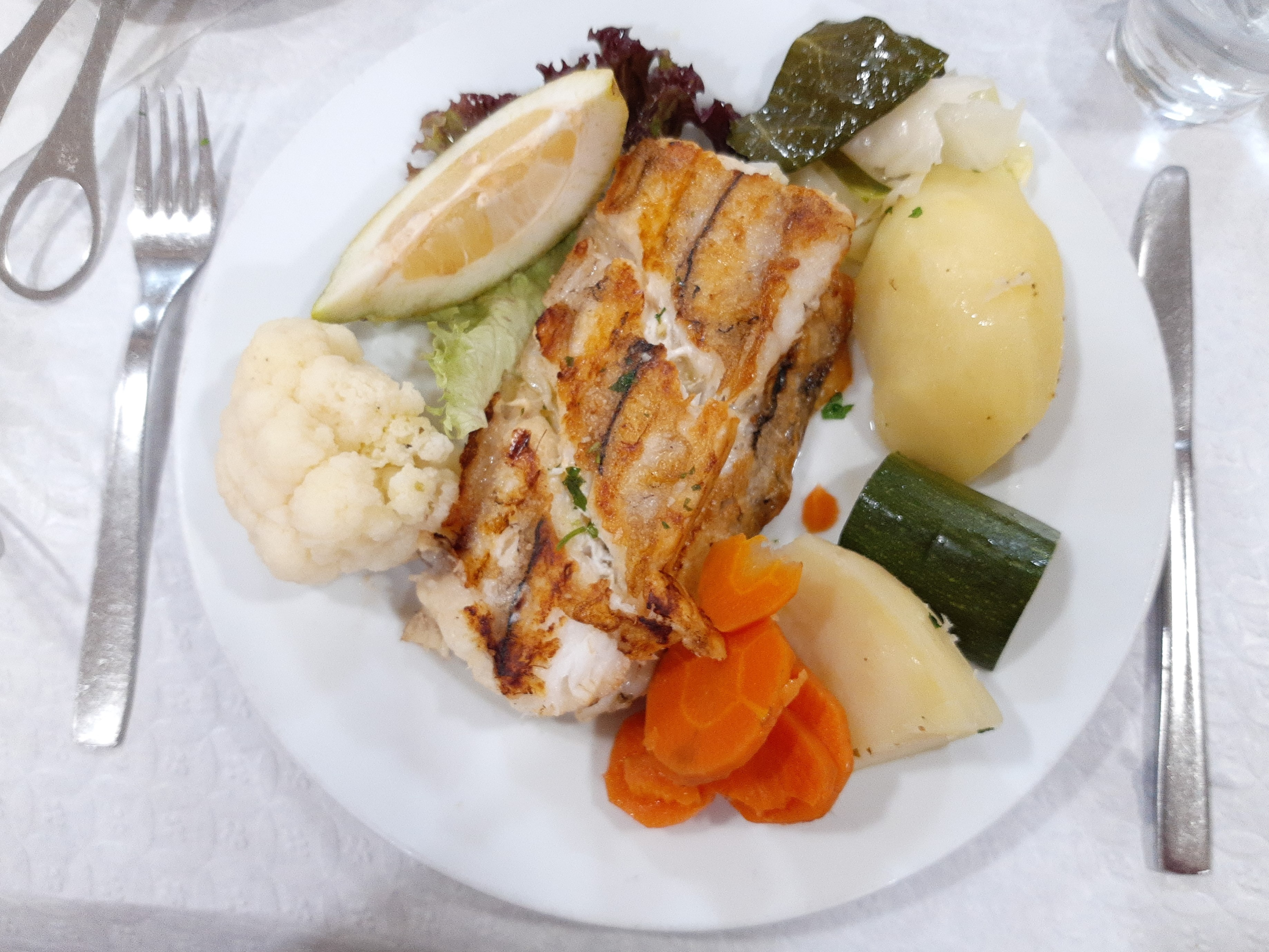
Black scabbardfish (espada), São Vicente, Madeira

There are many different meat dishes on Madeira, one of the most popular being espetada. Espetada em pau de louro is traditionally made of large chunks of beef rubbed in garlic, salt and bay leaf and marinated for 4 to 6 hours in Madeira wine, red wine vinegar and olive oil then skewered onto a bay laurel stick and left to grill over smouldering wood chips. These are so integral a part of traditional eating habits that a special iron stand is available with a T-shaped end, each branch of the "T" having a slot in the middle to hold a brochette (espeto in Portuguese); a small plate is then placed underneath to collect the juices. The brochettes are very long and have a V-shaped blade in order to pierce the meat more easily. It is usually accompanied with the local bread called bolo do caco. A traditional holiday dish is "Carne de Vinho e Alhos", which is most closely associated with the pig slaughter that was held a few weeks before Christmas. A big event, traditionally it was attended by everyone in the village. The dish is made of pork which marinates for three days in white wine, vinegar, salt, and pepper and is then cooked with small potatoes, sliced carrots, and turnip. Another common meat dish is "Picado" – cubed beef cooked in a mushroom sauce and accompanied by fries.

Other popular dishes in Madeira include açorda, feijoada and carne de vinha d'alhos.

Traditional pastries in Madeira usually contain local ingredients, one of the most common being mel de cana, literally "sugarcane honey" (molasses). The traditional cake of Madeira is called Bolo de Mel, which translates as (Sugarcane) "Honey Cake" and according to custom, is never cut with a knife, but broken into pieces by hand. It is a rich and heavy cake. The cake commonly known as "Madeira cake" in England is named after Madeira wine.

Malasadas are a local confection which are mainly consumed during the Carnival of Madeira. Pastéis de nata, as in the rest of Portugal, are also very popular.

Milho frito is a popular dish in Madeira that is similar to the Italian dish polenta fritta. Açorda Madeirense is another popular local dish.

Madeira is known for the high quality of its cherimoya fruits. The Annona Festival is traditional and held annually in the parish of Faial. This event encourages the consumption of this fruit and its derivatives, such as liqueurs, puddings, ice cream and smoothies.

=== Beverages ===
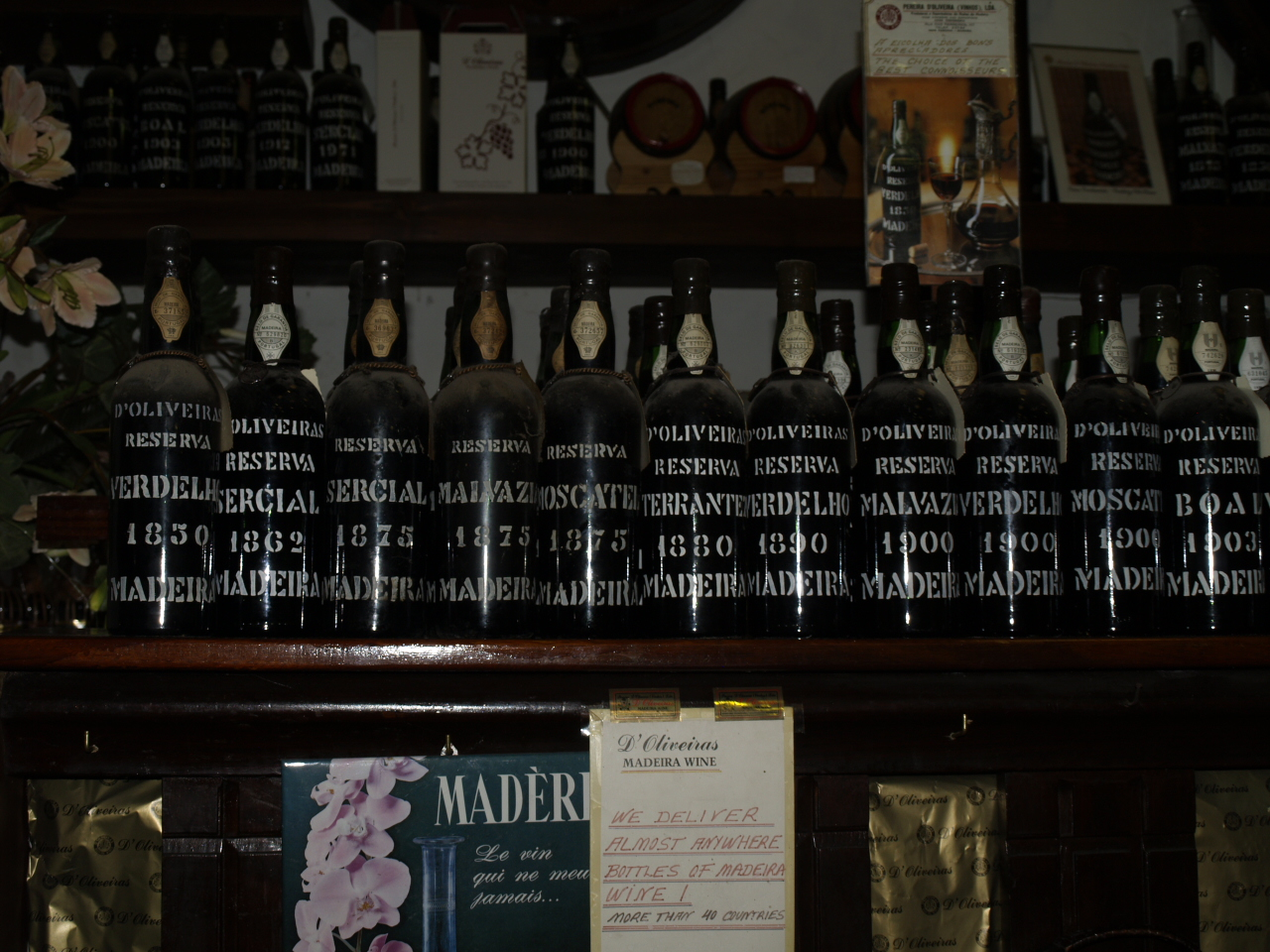
Bottles of Madeira labelled by the different grape varieties used to produce the many styles of wine

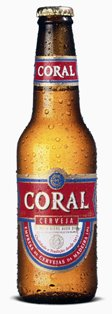
Coral Beer, produced since 1872 in the Island's main brewery, has achieved several Monde Selection medals.

Madeira wine is a fortified wine produced in the Madeira Islands; varieties may be sweet or dry. It has a history dating back to the Age of Exploration when Madeira was a standard port of call for ships heading to the New World or East Indies. To prevent the wine from spoiling, neutral grape spirits were added. However, wine producers of Madeira discovered, when an unsold shipment of wine returned to the islands after a round trip, that the flavour of the wine had been transformed by exposure to heat and movement. Today, Madeira is noted for its unique winemaking process that involves heating the wine and deliberately exposing the wine to some levels of oxidation. Most countries limit the use of the term Madeira to those wines that come from the Madeira Islands, to which the European Union grants Protected designation of origin (PDO) status. A local beer called Coral is produced by the Madeira Brewery, which dates from 1872. It has achieved 2 Monde Selection Grand Gold Medals, 24 Monde Selection Gold Medals and 2 Monde Selection Silver Medals. Other alcoholic drinks are also popular in Madeira, such as the locally created Poncha, Niquita, Pé de Cabra, and Aniz, as well as Portuguese drinks such as Macieira Brandy, Licor Beirão.

Laranjada is a type of carbonated soft drink with an orange flavour, its name being derived from the Portuguese word laranja ("orange"). Launched in 1872 it was the first soft drink to be produced in Portugal, and remains very popular to the present day. Brisa drinks, a brand name, are also very popular and come in a range of flavours.

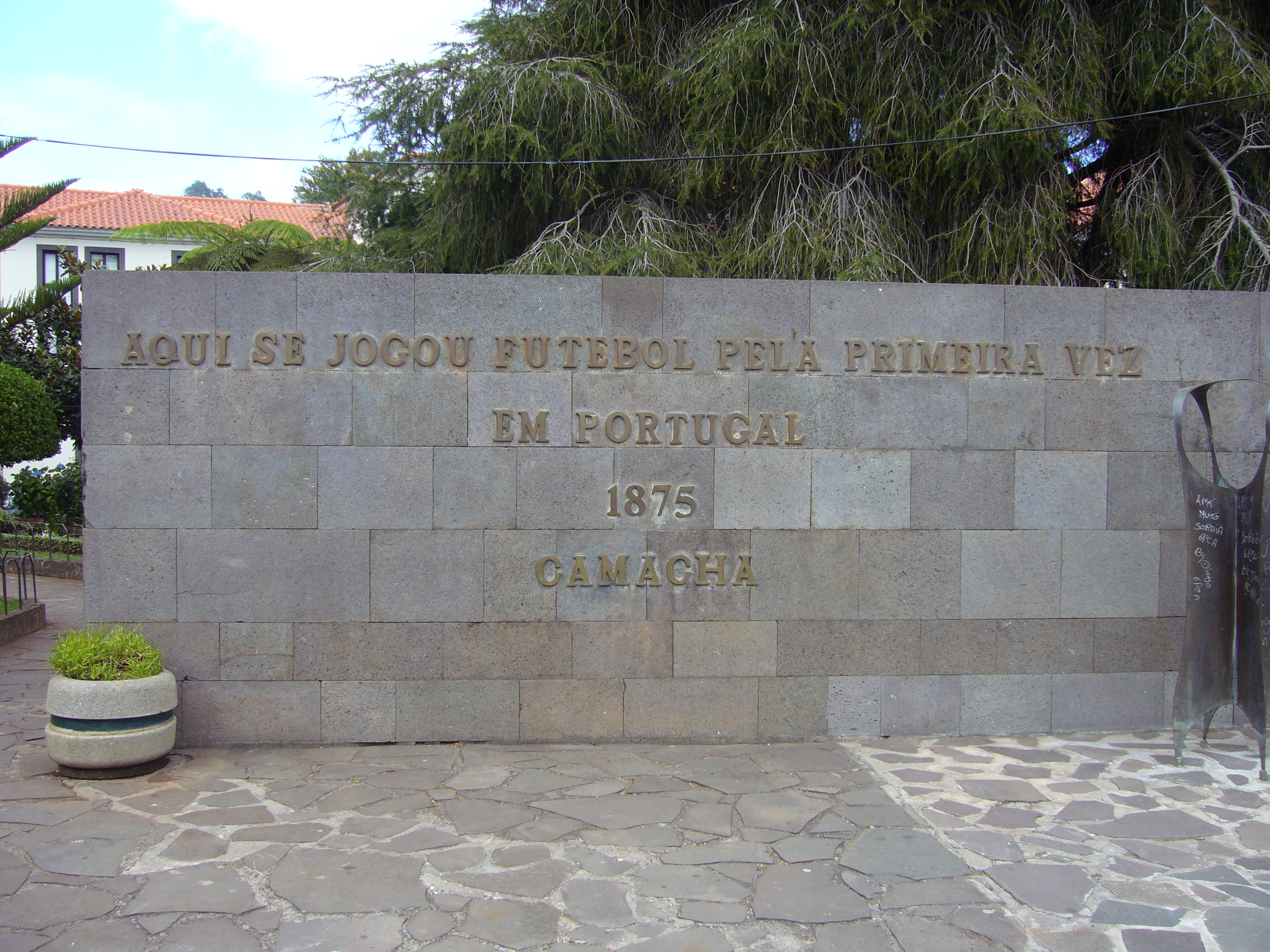
Monument in Camacha, celebrating the first ever organised football game in Portugal

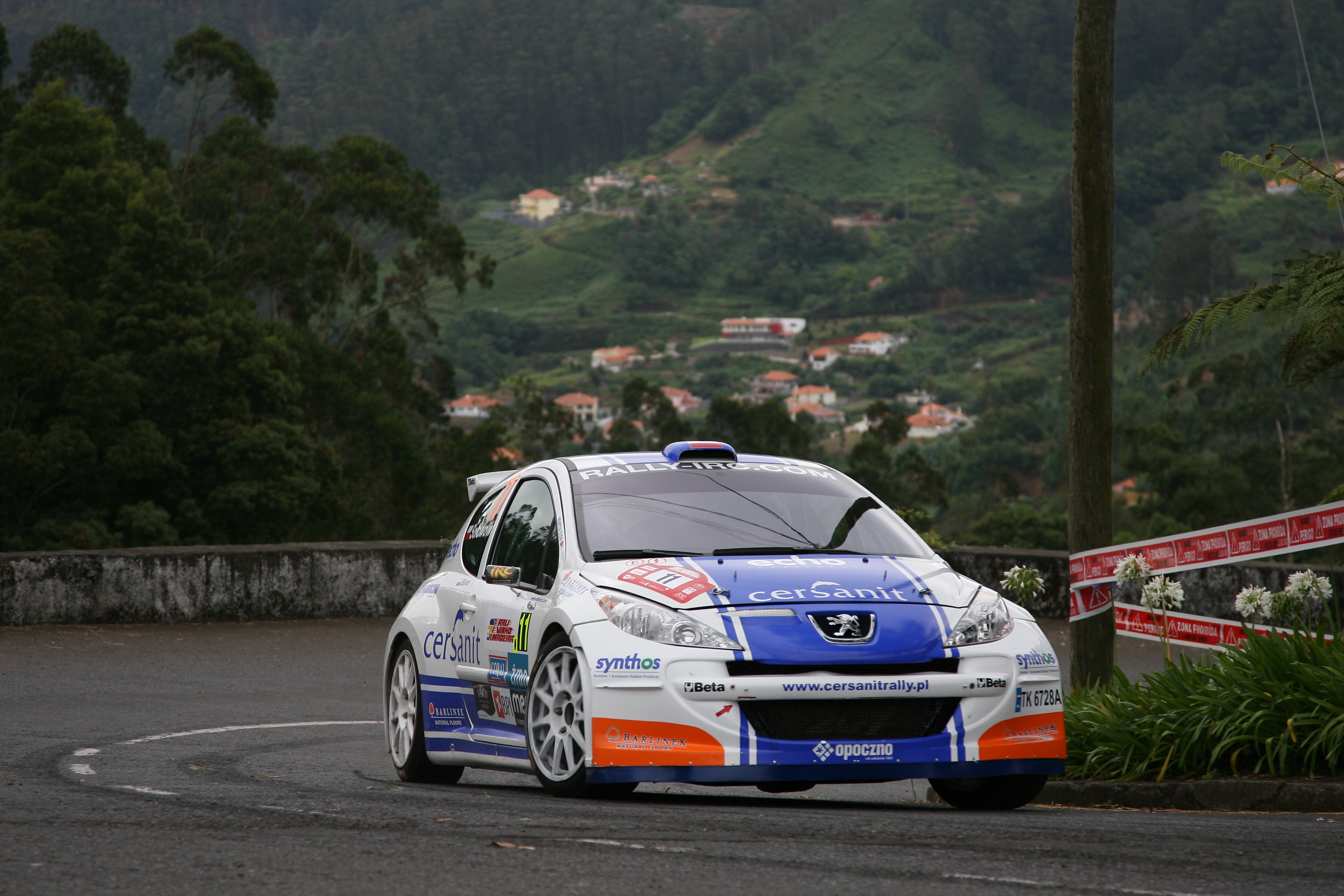
Rali da Madeira

=== Sport ===
Football is the most popular sport in Madeira and the island was indeed the first place in Portugal to host a match, organised by British residents in 1875. The island is the birthplace of international star Cristiano Ronaldo and is home to two prominent teams, C.S. Marítimo and C.D. Nacional, the latter of which he played youth football for before leaving to join Sporting CP.

The island is also home to professional sports teams in basketball (CAB Madeira) and handball (Madeira Andebol SAD, who were runners up in the 2019 European Challenge Cup). Madeira was also the host of the 2003 World Handball Championship.

The Rally Vinho da Madeira is a rally race held annually since 1959, considered one of the biggest sporting events on the island It was part of the European Rally Championship from 1979 to 2012 and the Intercontinental Rally Challenge from 2006 to 2010.Other popular sporting activities include golf at one of the island's two courses (plus one on Porto Santo), surfing, scuba diving, and hiking.

=== Postage stamps ===
Portugal has issued postage stamps for Madeira during several periods, beginning in 1868.

== See also ==
- Geology of Madeira
- "Have Some Madeira M'Dear"
- Islands of Macaronesia
  - Azores – Portuguese archipelago in the North Atlantic
  - Cabo Verde – Island country in West Africa
  - Canary Islands – Spanish archipelago off the coast of Northwest Africa
- List of birds of Madeira
- Madeira Islands Open – An annual European Tour golf tournament
- Surfing in Madeira
- Cristiano Ronaldo – A footballer born in Madeira
