= List of supermarket chains in South America =

This is a list of supermarket chains in South America.

The largest supermarket chains originating from the continent are Éxito and Tía. International chains are also present, such as Walmart and Carrefour.

== Argentina ==
- La Anónima
- Carrefour
- Coto
- Dia %
- Disco-Jumbo-Vea (Cencosud)
- La Genovesa
- Comodín
- Supermercado Dar
- Buenos Días
- Vital
- Maxiconsumo
- Diarco
- Libertad
- Emilio Luque
- Kilbel
- Alvear
- Becerra
- Supermercados La Proveeduría
- Changomás (owned by Walmart Argentina)
- Supermercados Llaneza
- Walmart
- Makro

== Bolivia ==
- EMAPA (state-owned)
- Hipermaxi
- Fidalga
- IC Norte
- Multicenter
- Ketal
- Tía

== Chile ==
- Jumbo (owned by Cencosud)
- Santa Isabel (owned by Cencosud)
- Líder (owned by Walmart-Chile)
- Superbodega Acuenta (owned by Walmart-Chile)
- Tottus (owned by Falabella)
- Unimarc (owned by SMU S.A.)

== Colombia ==
- Alkosto (cash & carry)
- Almacenes la 14
- Almacenes Éxito owned by Groupe Casino
  - Almacenes Ley (rebranded of Almacenes Exito in 2012)
  - Bodegas Surtimax (cash & carry, brand of Almacenes Exito)
  - Cafam (rebranded to Almacenes Exito in 2010)
  - Carulla (brand of Almacenes Exito)
  - Pomona (brand of Almacenes Exito)
  - SuperLEY (rebranded to Almacenes Ley in 2003)
  - Vivero (rebranded to Almacenes Exito in 2007)
- Almacenes Olímpica
  - SAO (hypermarkets to Olimpica)
- Ara (from 2013, brand to Jeronimo Martins)
- Jumbo
- Metro
- Carrefour (closed in 2013)
- Colsubsidio
- Cooratiendas
- Consumo
- D1 (first discounter supermarket in Colombia)
- Euro supermercado
- Makro (cash & carry)
- Super Inter
- Surtifruver de la Sabana (fruits and vegetables)
- Tía (closed in 2017)
- Yep (gone into liquidation)

== Ecuador ==
- Mi Comisariato / HYPER market
- Supermaxi / Megamaxi
- Tía

== French Guiana ==
- Carrefour
- Géant Casino

== Paraguay ==
- Stock owned by Grupo Vierci
- Super Seis owned by Grupo Vierci
- Diefer
- La Bomba
- Salemma
- Gran Via
- Real

== Peru ==
- Grupo Falabella
  - Tottus
  - Precio Uno
  - Tottus Vecino
- SHV Holdings N.V.
  - Makro
- Supermercados Peruanos
  - Mass
  - Economax
  - Market San Jorge
  - Plaza Vea
  - Vivanda
- Cencosud
  - Metro
  - Wong
- GRUPO VEGA
  - Tiendas VEGA

== Uruguay ==
- Ta-Ta
- Disco owned by Groupe Casino
- Devoto owned by Groupe Casino
- Tienda Inglesa
- El Dorado

== Venezuela ==
- Abasto Bicentenario
- Automercados Plaza's
- Central Madeirense
- Líder
- Makro
- Mikro
- Mercal
- San Diego
- Supermercado La Franco Italiana
- Unicasa
- Excelsior Gama
