= Central Madeirense =

Supermarket chain in Venezuela founded in 1949

- Motto: ¡Viva mejor por menos!
- Established: 11 November 1949
- Type: Supermarket
- Location: Venezuela

Central Madeirense is a supermarket chain in Venezuela founded on 11 November 1949 by four families originally from Madeira, Portugal, who had settled in the country. Its first store was located in the 23 de Enero neighborhood, west of Caracas. At its peak it had 53 stores in 38 cities, becoming the largest chain in the country.

== See also ==
- Excelsior Gama
- List of supermarket chains in South America
