= Supermercados Llaneza =

Supermercados Llaneza was a supermarket industry pioneer in Latin America that inaugurated La Estrella Argentina, the first self-service market of the region in 1951, in Mar del Plata, Argentina. Its founders were Silvino Llaneza González and Bernardino Brasas, Spanish immigrants who also founded the Camara Argentina de Supermercados (Argentine Chamber of Supermarkets).

La Estrella Argentina had three stores when Llaneza died and his sons Silvino "Coco" Llaneza and Bernardino Mac Llaneza took care of the family business while still being very young.

Throughout the following decades they changed the company name to Supermercados Llaneza and eventually expanded the chain to 54 stores, several distribution centers and 3,000 employees. The grocery chain became the center of the economic group "Silvino Llaneza e hijos", with several companies that supplied their stores.

With geographical coverage from Buenos Aires to La Plata, the company was for decades a leader south of Greater Buenos Aires.

Having been victims of the kidnapping wave in the 1970s, when turbulent times returned to Argentina in the late eighties it was decided that the family name Llaneza should be separated from the business brand. A cluster was named El Mas Gauchito with the slogan "the price tamer", and another - targeting higher income areas - was named Sumo.

In the 90's had a great process of expansion getting two significant properties of the Cooperativa El Hogar Obrero: A hypermarket on the main avenue of the city of Quilmes and the Spinetto Shopping in Buenos Aires, in addition to hundreds of retails stores in this property that at its center had an hypermarket.

The conglomerate could not adjust to the changes happening in Argentina during the nineties, eventually filing for bankruptcy in 1998.

== See also ==
- List of supermarket chains in South America
