= Demographics of Madeira =

The island was settled by Portuguese people, especially peasants, farmers, fishermen and quarry men from the Minho region, though they have developed a distinct regional identity of cultural traits over the centuries.

Other segments that contributed for the ethnic demography of Madeirans included a class of English merchants & traders, French bourgeoisie, Genoese investors, Flemish property owners and the Guanche workforce on a smaller scale.

The region of Madeira and Porto Santo has a total population of just under 256,060, the majority of whom live on Madeira Island (251,060), where the population density is 337/km^{2}; leaving around 5,000 on Porto Santo Island, where the population density is 112/km^{2}.

About 247,000 residents, or 96% of the population, are Catholic. Funchal is the location of the Catholic cathedral.

Municipalities	Population (2017 Estimate)	Area (km^{2})	Main city/town	Freguesias
Funchal	104,442	76.1	Funchal	10
Santa Cruz	44,417	81.5	Santa Cruz	5
Câmara de Lobos	33,847	52.1	Câmara de Lobos	5
Machico	20,272	68.3	Machico	5
Ribeira Brava	12,428	65.4	Ribeira Brava	4
Calheta	10,901	112	Calheta	8
Ponta do Sol	8,559	46.2	Ponta do Sol	3
Santana	6,808	95.6	Santana	6
Porto Santo	5,173	42.6	Vila Baleira	1
São Vicente	5,151	78.8	São Vicente	3
Porto Moniz	2,371	82.9	Porto Moniz	4
Total	244,286	801	Total	54
