= Supermercados Disco del Uruguay =

Supermarket chain in Uruguay

Supermercados Disco del Uruguay is a supermarket chain in Uruguay. It is the largest supermarket chain in Uruguay. An Argentine chain also named Supermercados Disco was owned from 1961 to 1984 by Supermercados Disco del Uruguay.

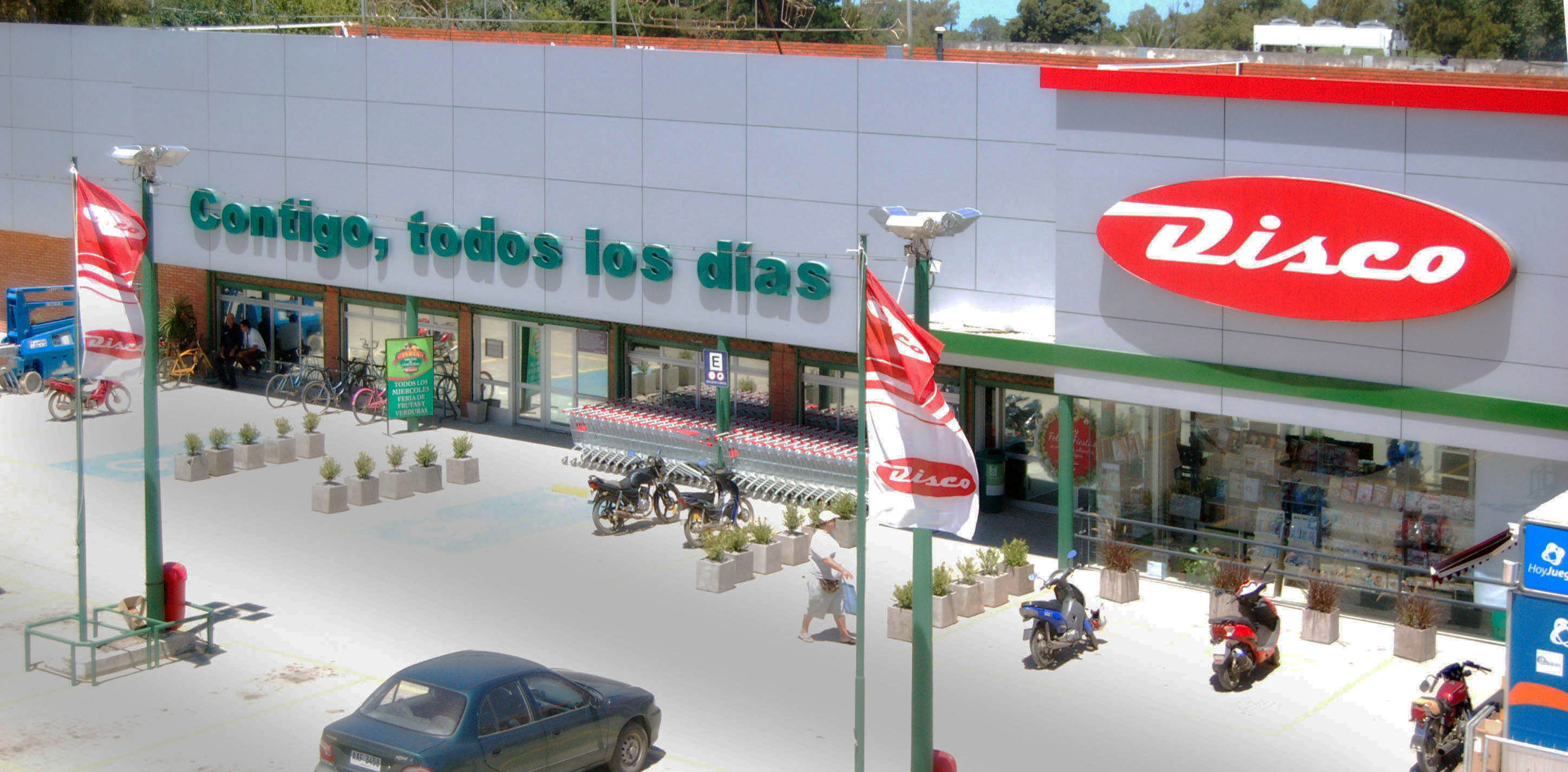
A Supermercados Disco del Uruguay location

== History ==
The first Supermercado Disco was opened in 1960 in Montevideo, Uruguay.

In 2000, Supermercados Disco del Uruguay expanded by obtaining the locations of competing supermarket chain Supermercados Hermanos Devoto.

As of 2020, Supermercados Disco del Uruguay has 29 stores across the country.
