= Excelsior Gama =

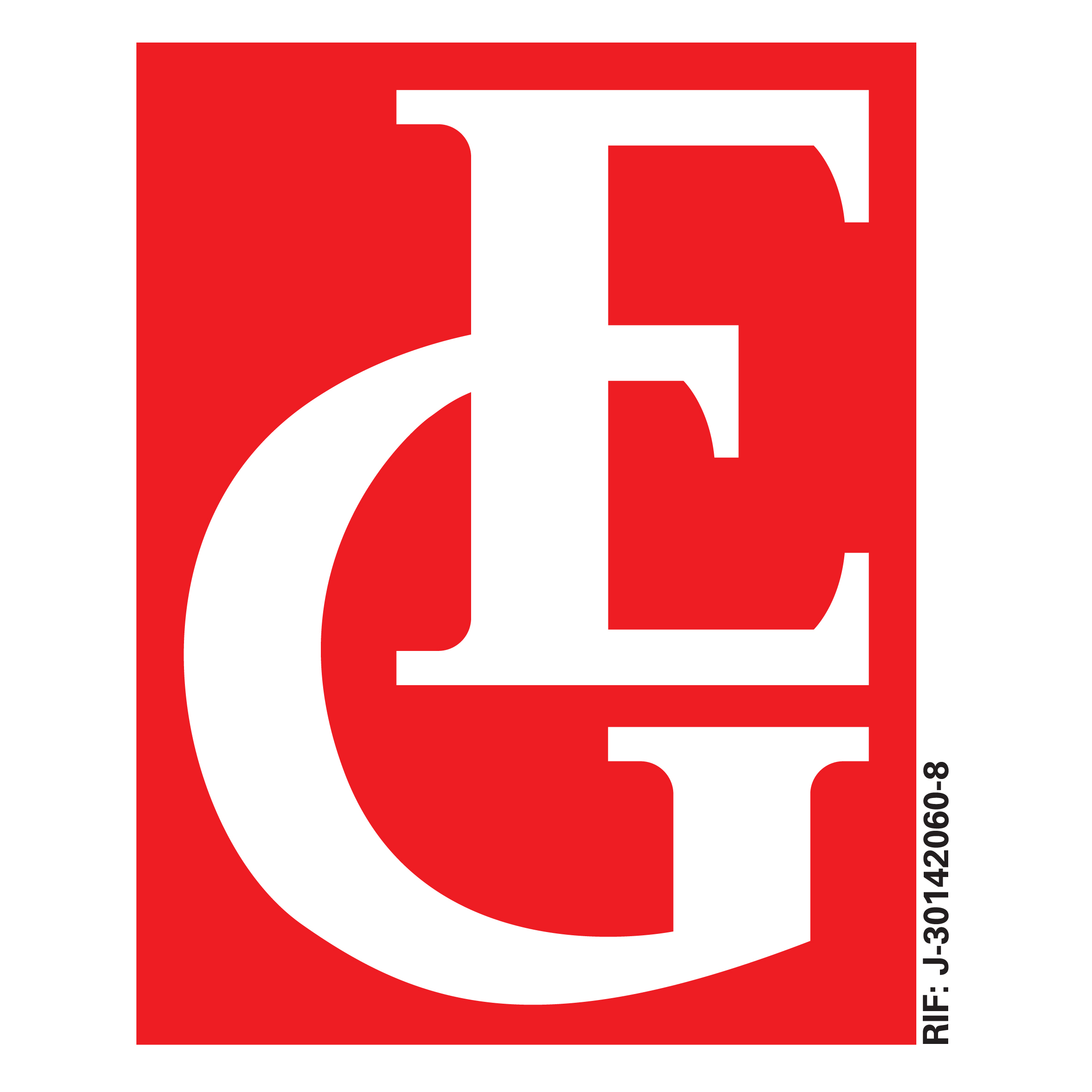
- Motto: Sin ti no hay nosotros Excelente calidad en productos y servicios (formerly)
- Established: 19 May 1969
- Type: Supermarket
- Location: Venezuela

Excelsior Gama, known simply as Gama since 2021, is a supermarket chain in Venezuela. It was founded on 19 May 1969 by Portuguese migrant Manuel Da Gama in Los Palos Grandes, in east Caracas, with 27 employees. By 2021 it had 24 stores and over 3,000 employees, and 26 stores by 2026.

== See also ==
- Central Madeirense
- List of supermarket chains in South America
