= Madeira's Autonomic Insignia =

Madeira's Autonomic Insignia may refer to:

- Autonomic Insignia of Valour
- Autonomic Insignia of Distinction
- Autonomic Insignia of Good Services
