= President of the Legislative Assembly of Madeira =

President of the Legislative Assembly of the Autonomous Region of Madeira
- Presidente da Assembleia Legislativa da Região Autónoma da Madeira
- Coat of arms of Madeira

- Flag of Madeira
- Incumbent; Rubina Leal since 10 April 2025
- Style: His/Her excellency
- Nominator: 5–15 members of the legislature
- Appointer: Legislative Assembly of Madeira; Elected by the majority of the members of the legislature
- Term length: 4 years if the legislature is not dissolved sooner; No term limits
- Constituting instrument: Constitution of Portugal
- Inaugural holder: Emanuel Rodrigues
- Formation: 19 July 1976
- Deputy: José Prada; Rafaela Fernandes; Rafael Nunes
- Website: alram.pt

The president of the Legislative Assembly of Madeira is the speaker of the regional parliament of this autonomous region of Portugal.

The position was created in 1976 after the newly enacted Constitution of Portugal, which followed the 1974 Revolution, granted legislative autonomy to the Azores and Madeira archipelagoes, thus establishing the Portuguese Autonomous Regions and the respective governing bodies. It is analogous to the position of president of the Legislative Assembly of the Azores and both are equally 14th in the Portuguese order of precedence, being this the highest ranking position of any regional governing body.

Following the first Madeiran regional elections the same year, which resulted in the Democratic Peoples' Party (now Social Democratic Party) having the majority of members of parliament, Emanuel Nascimento dos Santos Rodrigues was elected the first president of the Legislative Assembly. The position has since been held by members of the same party, which has never lost its majority. The current President is Rubina Leal, the first woman to hold the post.

Two of the presidents were physicians (Nélio and Miguel Mendonça), two were/are lawyers (Rodrigues and Tranquada Gomes) and one (Leal) a Sociologist before taking office.

== List of presidents ==
The colors indicate the political affiliation of each president.

Social Democratic
CDS – People's Party

Term	No.	Portrait	Name (Lifespan)	Term of office			Party
Term	No.	Portrait	Name (Lifespan)	Start	End	Duration	Party
Legislative Assembly of Madeira (1976–present)
I	1		Emanuel Rodrigues (1943–2019)	19 July 1976	8 November 1984	8 years, 112 days	Social Democratic
II	1		Emanuel Rodrigues (1943–2019)	19 July 1976	8 November 1984	8 years, 112 days	Social Democratic
III	2		Nélio Mendonça (1930–2009)	8 November 1984	1994	~10 years	Social Democratic
IV	2		Nélio Mendonça (1930–2009)	8 November 1984	1994	~10 years	Social Democratic
V	2		Nélio Mendonça (1930–2009)	8 November 1984	1994	~10 years	Social Democratic
V	3		Miguel Mendonça (born 1935)	1994	20 April 2015	~21 years	Social Democratic
VI	3		Miguel Mendonça (born 1935)	1994	20 April 2015	~21 years	Social Democratic
VII	3		Miguel Mendonça (born 1935)	1994	20 April 2015	~21 years	Social Democratic
VIII	3		Miguel Mendonça (born 1935)	1994	20 April 2015	~21 years	Social Democratic
IX	3		Miguel Mendonça (born 1935)	1994	20 April 2015	~21 years	Social Democratic
X	3		Miguel Mendonça (born 1935)	1994	20 April 2015	~21 years	Social Democratic
XI	4		José Tranquada Gomes (born 1958)	20 April 2015	15 October 2019	4 years, 178 days	Social Democratic
XII	5		José Manuel Rodrigues (born 1960)	15 October 2019	10 April 2025	5 years, 177 days	CDS – People's Party
XIII	5		José Manuel Rodrigues (born 1960)	15 October 2019	10 April 2025	5 years, 177 days	CDS – People's Party
XIV	5		José Manuel Rodrigues (born 1960)	15 October 2019	10 April 2025	5 years, 177 days	CDS – People's Party
XV	6		Rubina Leal (born 1966)	10 April 2025	present	1 year, 150 days	Social Democratic
