= Next Madeiran regional election =

- On or before 14 October 2029

47 seats to the Legislative Assembly of Madeira 24 seats needed for a majority
- Opinion polls
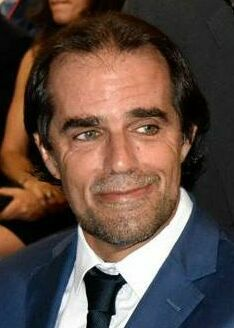

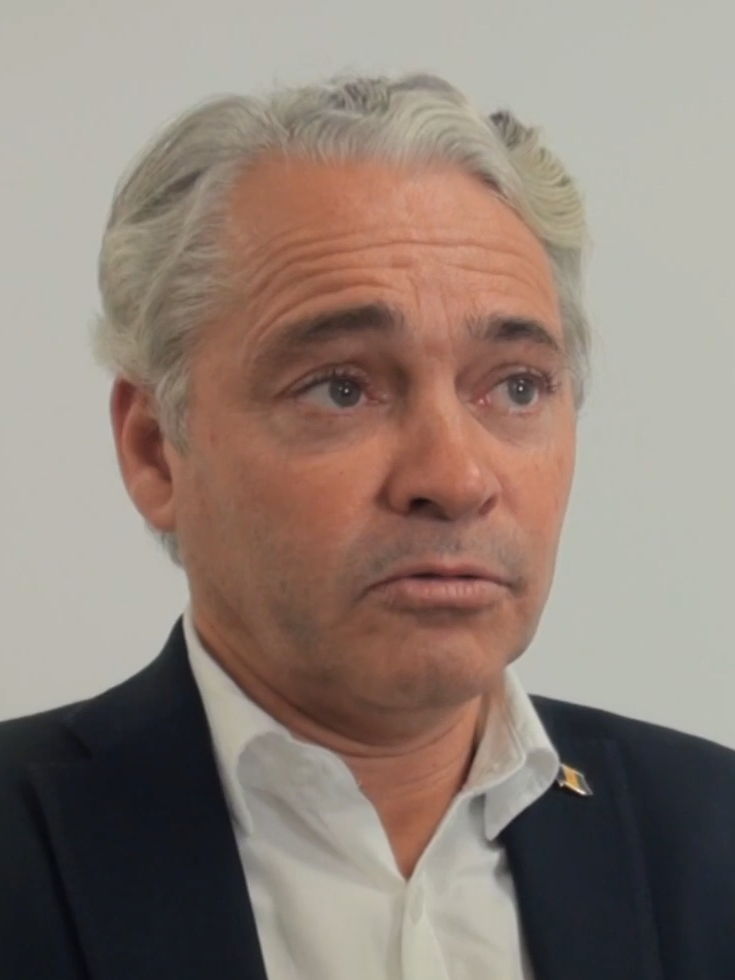

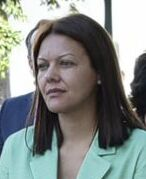

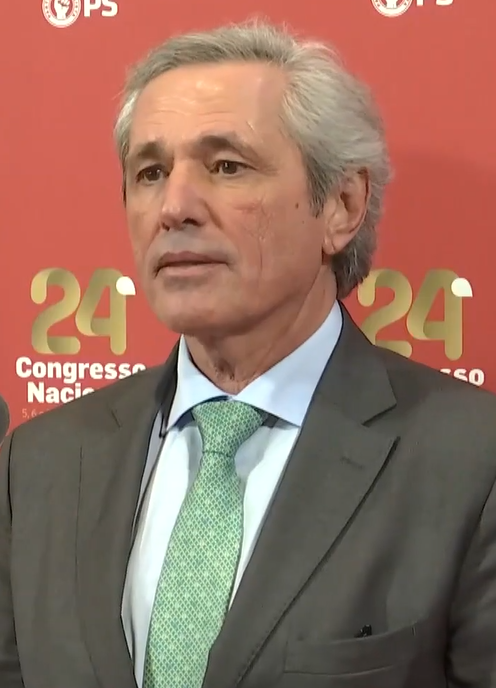

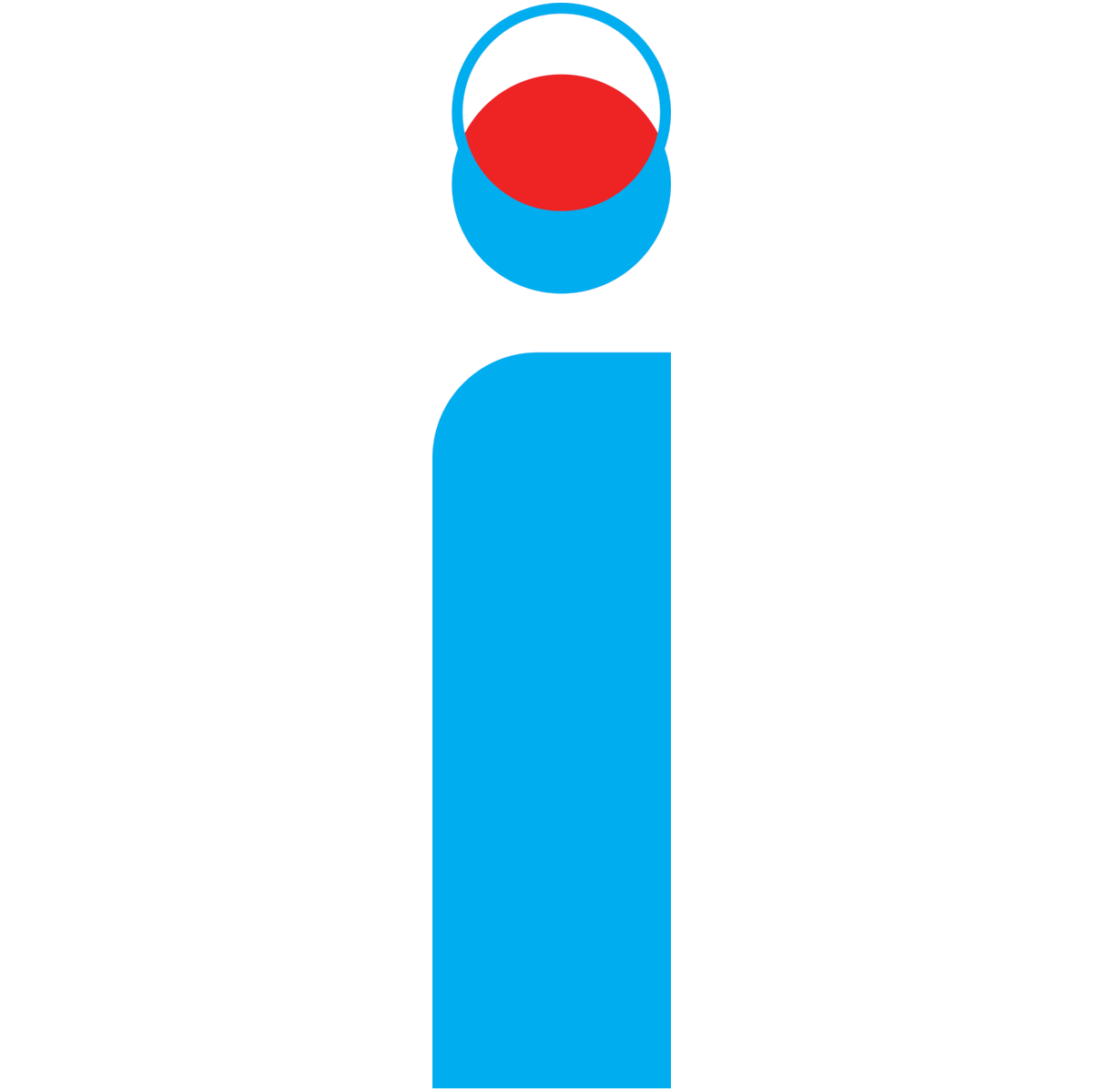
Leader	Miguel Albuquerque	Élvio Sousa	Célia Pessegueiro
Party	PSD	JPP	PS
Leader since	10 January 2015	27 January 2015	13 December 2025
Last election	23 seats, 43.4%	11 seats, 21.1%	8 seats, 15.6%
Current seats	23	11	8
Seats needed	▲1	▲13	▲16
Leader	Hugo Nunes	José Manuel Rodrigues	Gonçalo Maia Camelo
Party	CH	CDS–PP	IL
Leader since	28 June 2026	14 April 2024	27 July 2024
Last election	3 seats, 5.5%	1 seat, 3.0%	1 seat, 2.2%
Current seats	2	1	1
Seats needed	▲22	▲23	▲23
Incumbent President
Miguel Albuquerque
PSD

The next Madeiran regional election will be held on or before 14 October 2029, the composition of the Legislative Assembly of the Autonomous Region of Madeira. The election will replace all 47 members of the Madeira Assembly, and the new members will then elect the President of the Autonomous Region.

The incumbent President since 2015 is Miguel Albuquerque, from the Social Democratic Party (PSD). The Social Democrats will defend their dominance in the islands, which they have held since 1976.

== Background ==
Despite the suspicions regarding corruption investigations, the Social Democratic Party (PSD), led by Miguel Albuquerque, won another victory, with 43.4% of the votes and 23 seats, one short of a majority. The PSD signed an agreement with the CDS – People's Party, who elected one MP, securing a majority coalition regional government.

The regionalist party Together for the People, led by Élvio Sousa, gained 21.1% of the votes and 11 seats, surpassing the Socialist Party of Paulo Cafôfo and becoming the leader of the opposition.

Meanwhile, the far-right party Chega, led by Miguel Castro, lost ground, gaining only 5.5% of the votes and losing one of their 4 seats, while the Liberal Initiative kept their single seat. People Animals Nature (PAN) lost its sole seat, while parties on the left-wing, mainly Left Bloc (BE) and the Unitary Democratic Coalition (CDU) and but also LIVRE (L), failed to return or to be elected to the regional assembly.

In the October 2025 local elections, the PSD and CDS–PP lists, alone or in coalition, won a combined 47% of the votes and 7 councils (4 PSD/CDS; 2 PSD; 1 CDS), holding Funchal, winning Ponta do Sol, but losing São Vicente to Chega. JPP held on to Santa Cruz and became the second largest party in Funchal. The PS suffered a big defeat by losing one council and becoming the 4th party in Funchal, although holding on to Machico and Porto Moniz.

=== Leadership changes and challenges ===
==== Socialist Party ====
Following the party's bad results in the March 2025 regional election and in the May 2025 legislative election, regional leader Paulo Cafôfo faced pressures to resign from the leadership. On 26 May 2025, Cafôfo announced his resignation from the party's leadership and said that an election to elect a new leader would be held after the 2025 local elections, without him running again. On 14 October 2025, the outgoing mayor of Machico, Ricardo Franco, announced his intention to seek the leadership of the party. A few days later, former mayor of Ponta do Sol, Célia Pessegueiro, also announced her bid for the party's leadership. A leadership ballot was called for 13 December 2025. Ricardo Franco ended up withrawing from the race, leaving Célia Pessegueiro as the sole candidate. Célia Pessegueiro ended up being elected with 98.8% of the votes, becoming the first woman to lead the party:

Ballot: 13 December 2025
Candidate	Votes	%
Célia Pessegueiro	1,124	98.8
Blank/Invalid ballots	14	1.2
Turnout	1,138	70.99
Source: Results

==== Chega ====
A vote to elect a new leadership of the Chega-Madeira party was held on 28 June 28 2026, with then-regional leader Miguel Castro announcing that he would not be running for another term. Former regional assembly member Magna Costa intended to announce her candidacy, but was barred from running due to an alleged disciplinary proceeding. Regional assembly member and Câmara de Lobos local council member Hugo Nunes was the only candidate on the ballot and was elected as the new leader of Chega-Madeira.

Ballot: 28 June 2026
Candidate	Votes	%
Hugo Nunes	~187	94.6
Blank/Invalid ballots	~11	5.5
Turnout	~198	~33.00

A few months after the June 2026 leadership ballot, Hugo Nunes' predecessor as leader, Miguel Castro, announced his departure from the party, remaining as a member of the regional assembly as an independent.

== Electoral system ==
The current 47 members of the Madeiran regional parliament are elected in a single constituency by proportional representation under the D'Hondt method, coinciding with the territory of the Region. The next regional election is scheduled to be held between 22 September and 14 October 2029, if the legislature lasts its full 4-year term.

== Parties ==
=== Current composition ===
The table below lists parties represented in the Legislative Assembly of Madeira before the election.

Name		Ideology	Leader	2024 result		Currently	Status
Name		Ideology	Leader	%	Seats	Currently	Status
PPD/PSD	Social Democratic Party; Partido Social Democrata	Liberal conservatism	Miguel Albuquerque	43.4%	23 / 47	23 / 47	Governing coalition
JPP	Together for the People; Juntos pelo Povo	Social liberalism	Élvio Sousa	21.1%	11 / 47	11 / 47	Opposition
PS	Socialist Party; Partido Socialista	Social democracy	Célia Pessegueiro	15.6%	8 / 47	8 / 47	Opposition
CH	Enough! Chega!	National conservatism	Hugo Nunes	5.5%	3 / 47	2 / 47	Opposition
CDS–PP	CDS – People's Party; Centro Democrático Social – Partido Popular	Christian democracy	José Manuel Rodrigues	3.0%	1 / 47	1 / 47	Governing coalition
IL	Liberal Initiative; Iniciativa Liberal	Classical liberalism	Gonçalo Maia Camelo	2.2%	1 / 47	1 / 47	Opposition
Ind.	Independent; Independente	Miguel Castro (left the Chega caucus)				1 / 47	Opposition

== Opinion polls ==
Polls that show their results without distributing those respondents who are undecided or said they would abstain from voting, are re-calculated by removing these numbers from the totals through a simple rule of three, in order to obtain results comparable to other polls and the official election results.

Polling firm/Link	Fieldwork date	Sample size	Turnout	PSD	CDS–PP		PS	CH	IL	CDU	PAN	BE	O	Lead
2025 local elections	12 Oct 2025	—N/a	54.3	47.1 (25)		18.1 (9)	13.4 (7)	11.3 (6)	1.4 (0)	1.4 (0)	0.6 (0)	0.5 (0)	6.2 (0)	29.0
2025 legislative election	18 May 2025	—N/a	54.3	41.4 (22)		12.3 (6)	13.5 (7)	20.9 (11)	2.6 (1)	1.3 (0)	1.0 (0)	1.4 (0)	5.7 (0)	20.5
2025 regional election	23 Mar 2025	—N/a	56.0	43.4; 23	3.0; 1	21.1; 11	15.6; 8	5.5; 3	2.2; 1	1.8; 0	1.6; 0	1.1; 0	4.7; 0	22.3
