= Medal of Merit of the Autonomous Region of Madeira =

Order of chivalry in England

Medal of Merit of the Autonomous Region of Madeira Medalha de Mérito da Região Autónoma da Madeira

Awarded by Legislative Assembly of Madeira
- Type: Regional Honour
- Established: 1979; 46 years ago
- Eligibility: Natural or legal entities, public or private, national or foreign, living or posthumously.
- Criteria: Rendering outstanding services to the Region or who, for any other reason, the Region understands that must be distinguish
- Status: Currently constituted
- Classes: Collar

Statistics
- First induction: 1982
- Last induction: 2018

Precedence
- Next (lower): Autonomic Insignia of Valour

The Medal of Merit of the Autonomous Region of Madeira (Portuguese: Medalha de Mérito da Região Autónoma da Madeira) is the highest honour given by the autonomous region. The medal is awarded by the Legislative Assembly of Madeira to 'natural or legal entities, public or private, national or foreign, living or posthumously, who have rendered outstanding services to the Region or who, for any other reason, the Region understands that must be distinguish ”.

The honour was created by Regional Decree n. 3/79/M, signed on January 30 and published on March 24, 1979.

The decision of the attribution is made by the Standing Committee of the Assembly, having received a proposal «of any of the sovereign organs of the Republic, of the Regional Government or of any member of the Legislative Assembly» and taking the opinion of the President of the Regional Government or of a Regional Secretary and of other entities in the area concerned. At the request of any Member, a vote may be taken in the plenary of the Assembly.

The honour is presented by the President of the Legislative Assembly, in a solemn act defined by the Permanent Commission.

The medal model must comply with the following requirements defined by law: be made of silver, have a silver filigree cord and bear, on its reverse, the cross of the Order of Christ (present on the flag and coat of arms of Madeira) and the sayings 'Autonomous Region of Madeira' and 'Portuguese Republic'.

== Receivers ==
To date, the medal has only been awarded to five personalities, four of them Madeirans (Ornelas Camacho, Rodrigues, Jardim and Ronaldo) and two continental ones (Sá Carneiro and Bishop Santana).

Name	Date of Awarding	Notes
Francisco Antunes Santana	1 June 1982	Medal awarded posthumously and given to Canon Agostinho Gomes, Vicar General of the Diocese. Santana was bishop of Funchal between 1974 and 1982.
Francisco Sá Carneiro	1982	Medal awarded posthumously and given to his eldest son.
Jaime Ornelas Camacho	2001	First President of the Regional Government.
Emanuel Rodrigues	2001	First President of the Legislative Assembly.
Cristiano Ronaldo	21 December 2014	
Alberto João Jardim	4 June 2018	Longest serving President of the Regional Government and longests serving democratically elected politician in Portugal (between 1978 until 2015).
