= Autonomic Insignia of Valour =

Autonomic Insignia of Valour Insígnia autonómica de valor
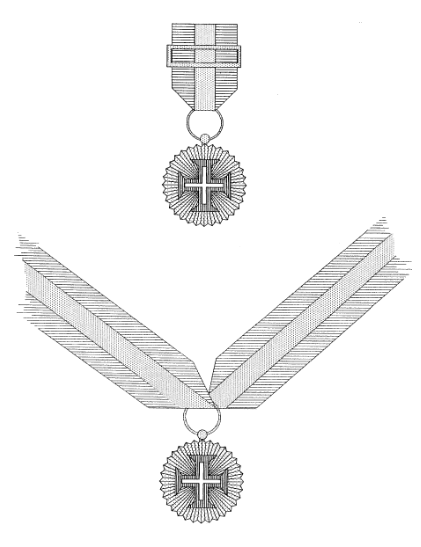
- Medal and Cordon of the Insignia

Awarded by Regional Government of Madeira
- Type: Regional Honour
- Established: 2003; 22 years ago
- Eligibility: Portuguese and Foreign Citizens
- Awarded for: Exceptionally relevant performance in positions in the organs of self-government, regional public administration or in the service of the Region, and which deserve special distinction; Professional performance and virtues, deserving to be worthy of public respect and consideration.
- Status: Currently constituted
- Grades: Cordon; Medal

Precedence
- Next (higher): Medal of Merit of the Autonomous Region of Madeira
- Next (lower): Autonomic Insignia of Distinction
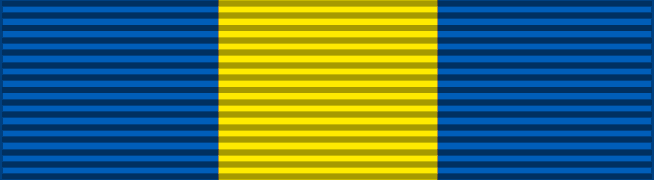
- Ribbon of the Insignia

The Autonomic Insignia of Valour (Portuguese: Insígnia autonómica de valor) is the second highest honor awarded by the Regional Government of Madeira, which “aims to distinguish, in life or posthumously, citizens, communities or institutions that stand out for personal or institutional merits, acts, acts services rendered to the Region ”.

The insignia were established through Regional Legislative Decree n. 21/2003/M of 13 August and regulated by Regional Regulatory Decree n. 9/2004/M of 12 April.

Its attribution is decided by deliberation of the Council of the Regional Government, after receiving proposals of any member of the Regional Government or of any member of the Regional Legislative Assembly.

== Purpose ==
According to Article 4 of Regional Legislative Decree no. 21/2003/M, the Autonomic Insignia of Valour is to be bestowed to those who had:

- Exceptionally relevant performance in positions in the organs of self-government, regional public administration or in the service of the Region, and which deserve special distinction;
- Professional performance and virtues, deserving to be worthy of public respect and consideration.

== Awarding ==
The insignia is usually award on the first of July, Madeira's regional holiday.
