= Autonomic Insignia of Distinction =

Autonomic Insignia of Distinction Insígnia Autonómica de Distinção

Awarded by Regional Government of Madeira
- Type: Regional Honour
- Established: 2003; 23 years ago
- Eligibility: Portuguese and Foreign citizens
- Awarded for: Those who value, honor and dignify the Region at home or abroad, or contribute to it; Contribute to the expansion of Madeiran culture or to the knowledge of Madeira and its history and values; Contribute to strengthening the affective, cultural and economic ties between all resident and absent Madeira; Distinguishe themselves by their dedication to the regional literary, scientific, artistic or sporting cause; Are distinguished by their dedication to the cause and services rendered for education and teaching, including communications at national or international congresses or symposia, or similar activities.
- Status: Currently constituted
- Grades: Cordon; Medal

Precedence
- Next (higher): Autonomic Insignia of Valour
- Next (lower): Autonomic Insignia of Good Services
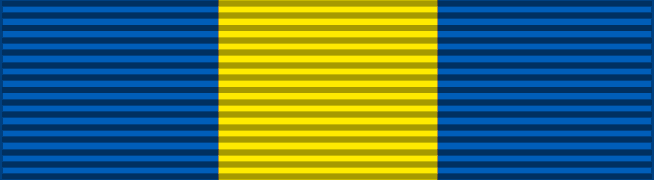
- Ribbon of the Insignia

The Autonomic Insignia of Distinction (Portuguese: Insígnia Autonómica de Distinção) is the third highest honor awarded by the Regional Government of Madeira, which “aims to distinguish, in life or posthumously, citizens, communities or institutions that stand out for personal or institutional merits, acts, acts services rendered to the Region ”.

The insignia were established through Regional Legislative Decree n. 21/2003/M of 13 August and regulated by Regional Regulatory Decree n. 9/2004/M of 12 April.

Its attribution is decided by deliberation of the Council of the Regional Government, after receiving proposals of any member of the Regional Government or of any member of the Regional Legislative Assembly.

== Purpose ==
According to Article 5 of Regional Legislative Decree no. 21/2003/M, the Autonomic Insignia of Valour is to be bestowed to those who:

- Value, honor and dignify the Region at home or abroad, or contribute to it;
- Contribute to the expansion of Madeiran culture or to the knowledge of Madeira and its history and values;
- Contribute to strengthening the affective, cultural and economic ties between all resident and absent Madeira;
- Distinguishe themselves by their dedication to the regional literary, scientific, artistic or sporting cause;
- Are distinguished by their dedication to the cause and services rendered for education and teaching, including communications at national or international congresses or symposia, or similar activities.

== Awarding ==
The insignia is usually award on the first of July, Madeira's regional holiday.
