= Quinta Vigia =

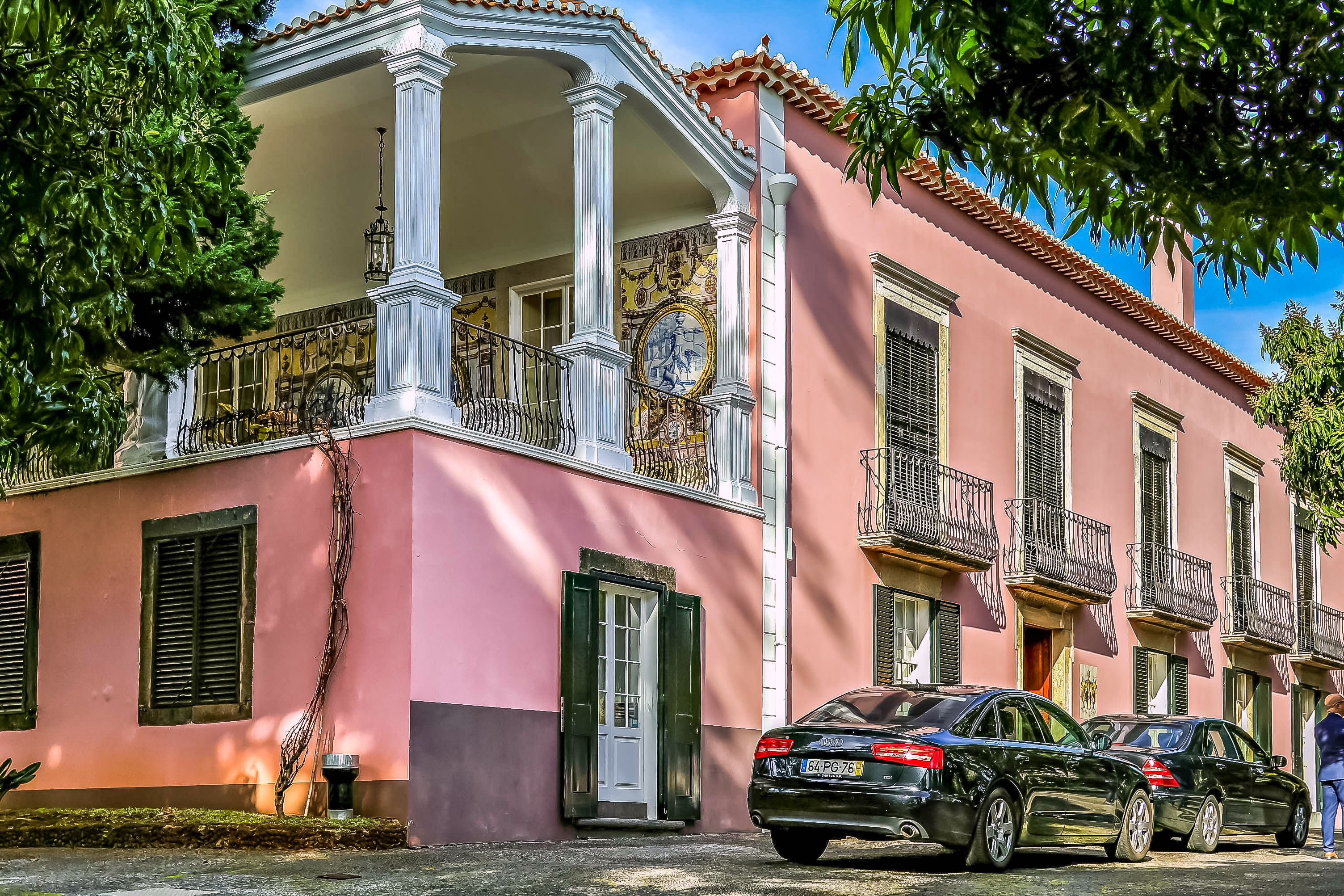
- Quinta Vigia's main façade as seen from the gardens
- Interactive map of the Quinta Vigia area
- Former names: Quinta das Angústias; Quinta Lambert

General information
- Type: Quinta
- Architectural style: Baroque; Neoclassic
- Location: Funchal, Av. do Infante 1, 9000-015 Funchal, Portugal
- Coordinates: 32°38′42″N 16°54′57″W
- Elevation: 40 m
- Current tenants: Miguel Albuquerque, President of the Regional Government of Madeira
- Groundbreaking: Unknown
- Construction started: Unknown
- Owner: Regional Government of Madeira

Technical details
- Floor area: 10 000 m2

Website
- https://www.madeira.gov.pt/presidencia

Quinta Vigia, also known as Quinta das Angústias and Quinta Lambert, is a quinta located in the city of Funchal, on the island of Madeira, which serves as the official residence and office of the president of the Regional Government of the Autonomous Region of Madeira.

== History ==
During the 19th century several illustrious personalities passed through or lived in this quinta, due to several reasons.

| Guests | Period of Stay | Reason of Stay |
|---|---|---|
| Maximilian, Duke of Leuchtenberg | 1849-1850 | Attempt to treat illness. |
| Amélie, Empress of Brazil and Duchess of Braganza | August 1852 - February 1853 | Attempt to treat tuberculosis. |
| Maria Amélia, Princess of Brazil | August 1852 - February 1853 | Attempt to treat tuberculosis. |
| Auguste, Duke of Leuchtenberg and Santa Cruz | 1834-1835 | Stopover from his voyage from Brazil to Portugal. |
| Josephine, Queen of Norway and Sweden | unknown | unknown |
| Karl Briullov | 1849-1850 | Attending Duke Maximilian of Leuchtenberg. |
| Adelaide, Queen of the United Kingdom | 1847 | Attempt to treat illness. |
| Elizabeth, Empress of Austria and Queen of Hungary | 1860 | Attempt to treat illness. |
| King Luis of Portugal | 1860 | Visit to the Empress Elizabeth of Austria. |
| Peter II, Grand Duke of Oldenburg | 1885 | Tourism |
| Karl Karlovich, Count of Lambert | 1864 | Acquisition and ownership of the quinta. |

The original name of this quinta was Quinta das Angústias, due to having a chapel dating from the 17th century that invoked Our Lady of Anguish.

Shortly thereafter Count Lambert, former field aide to the Russian empress, acquired the farm, having changed its name to Quinta Lambert. The farm returned to its old name Quinta das Angústias when it was acquired by Madeiran João Paulo de Freitas in 1903.

== Official residency ==
In 1979, when autonomy had already been implemented in Madeira, the property was purchased by the Regional Government. For some time, its facilities were used to house the Madeira Conservatory of Music, until it was transferred to the old Hotel Nova Avenida in 1981. The quinta was renamed "Quinta Vigia" in 1982, after the original Quinta Vigia, located nearby and on the site of the current Hotel Pestana Casino Park, had disappeared.

After works in its gardens, chapel and palace, the quinta was inaugurated as a residence of the president of the government on May 2, 1984. The gardens of the farm are open to the public, being mainly visited by foreign tourists. The farm also offers a beautiful view over the bay of Funchal.

== Gallery ==
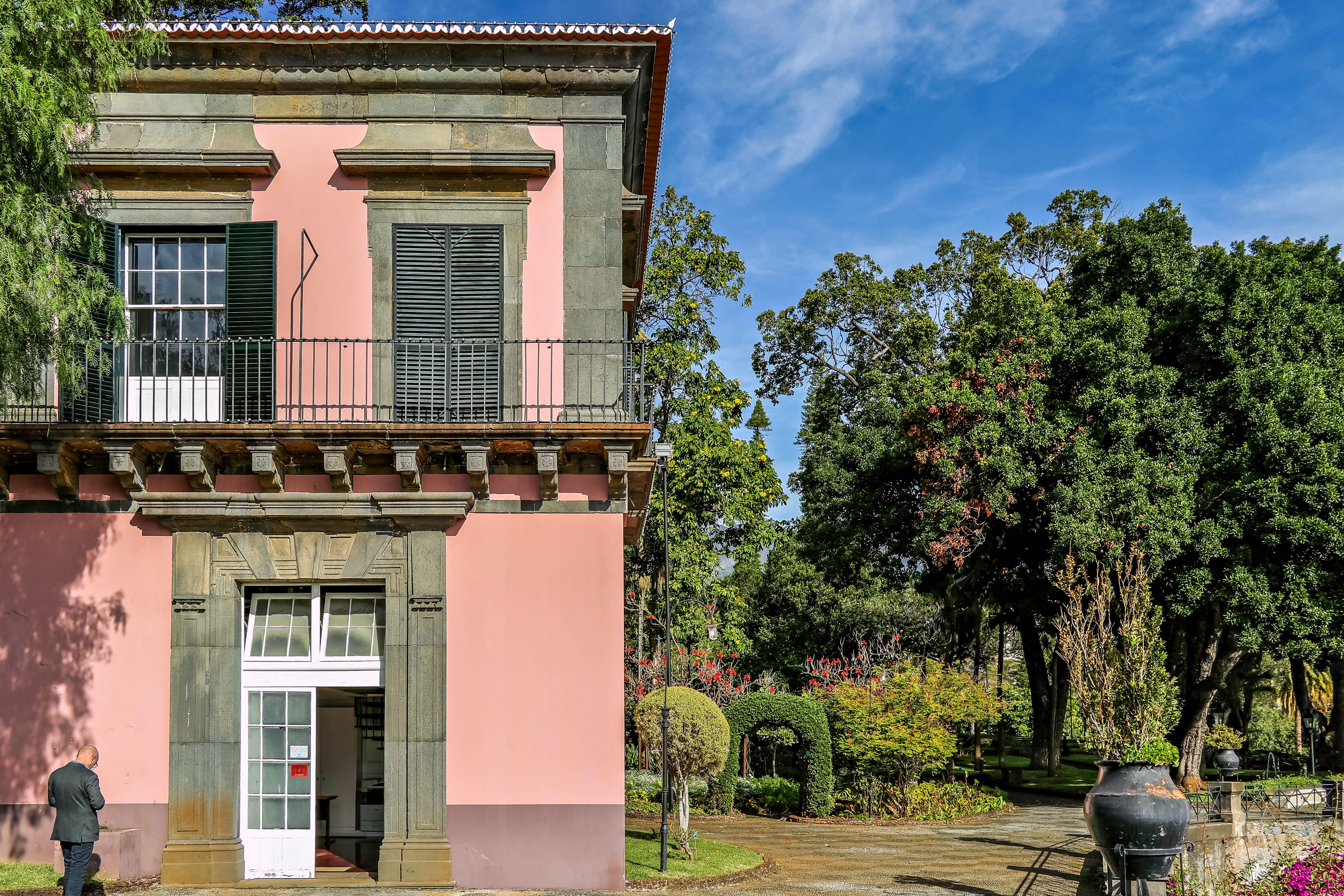

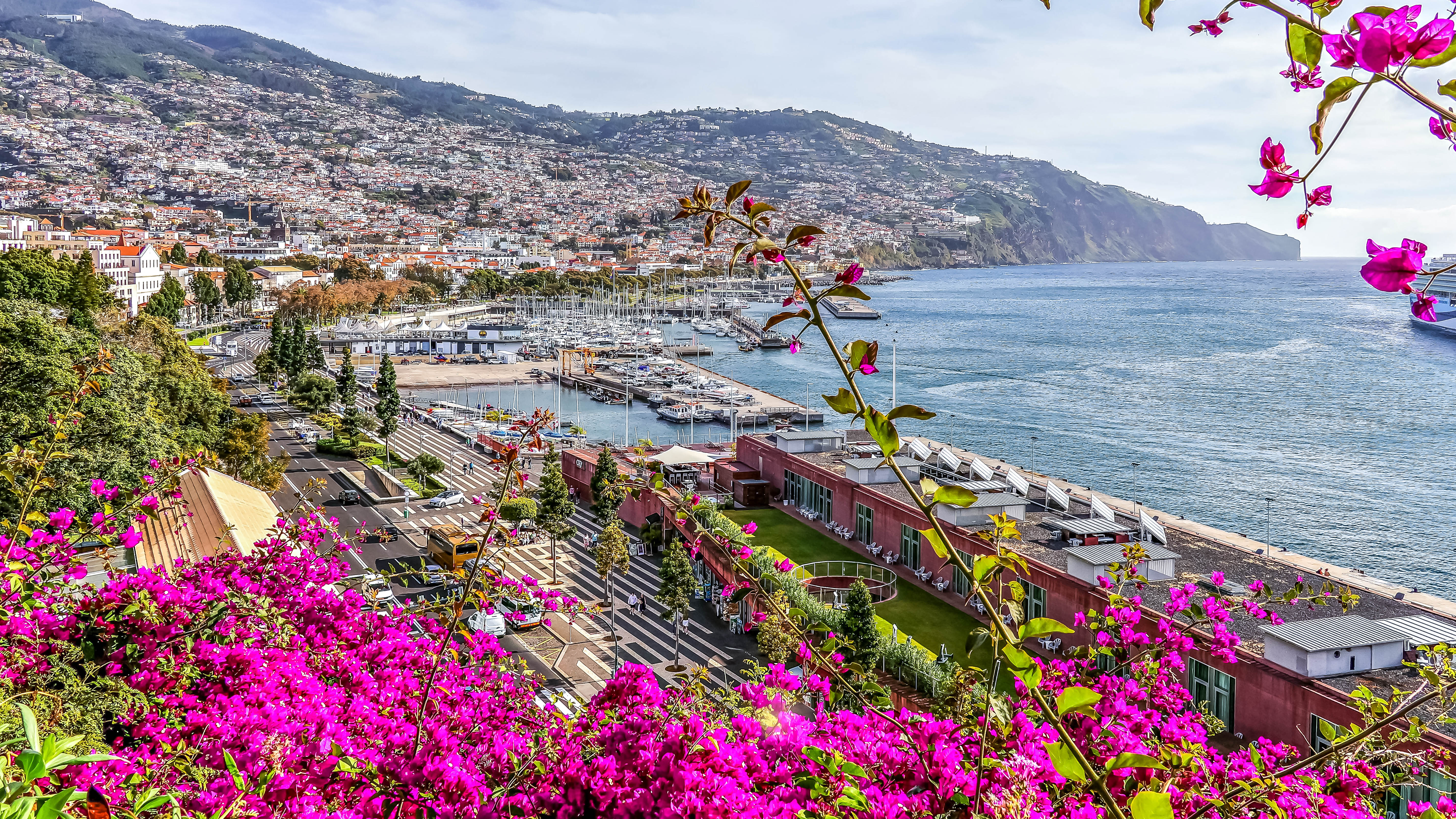

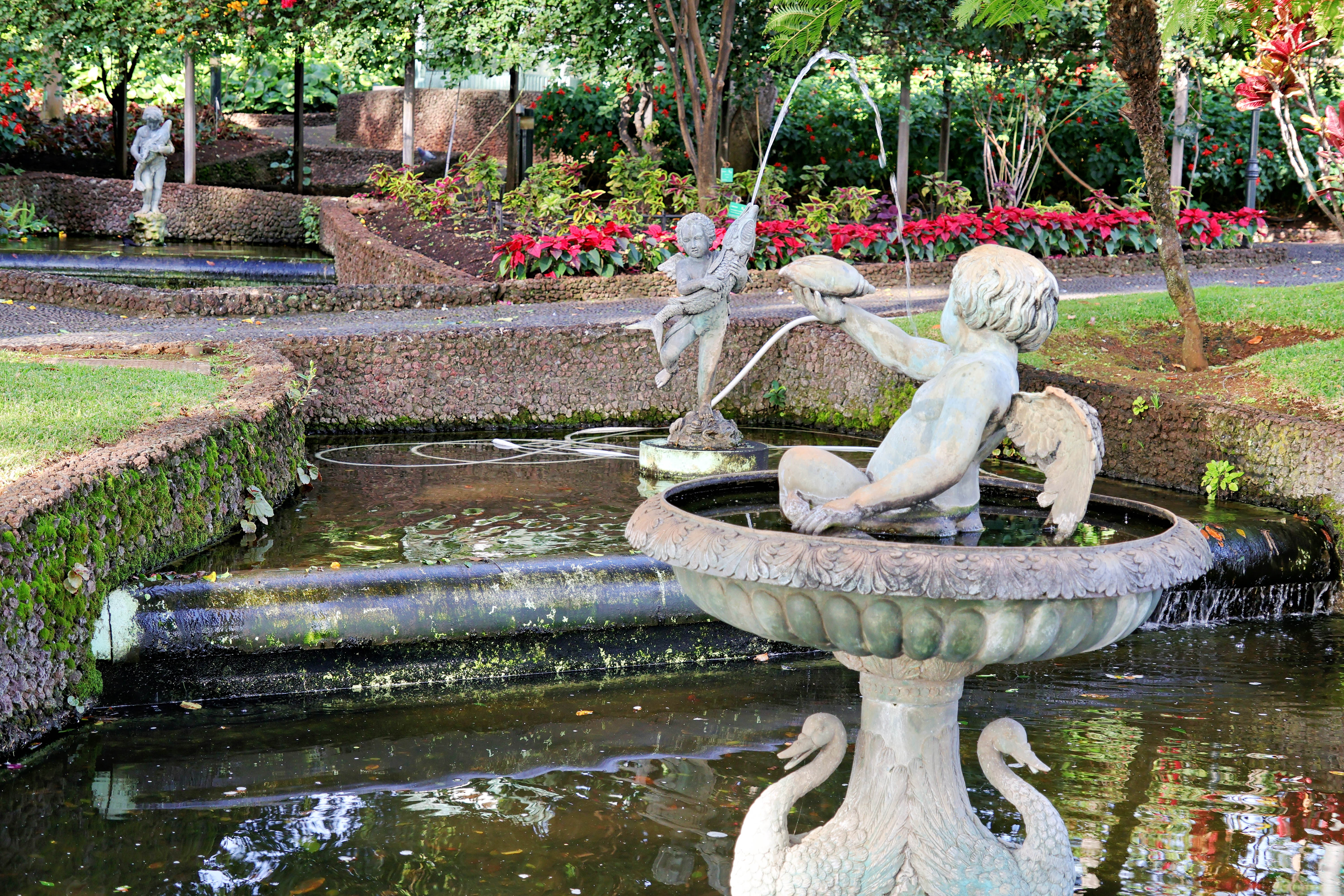

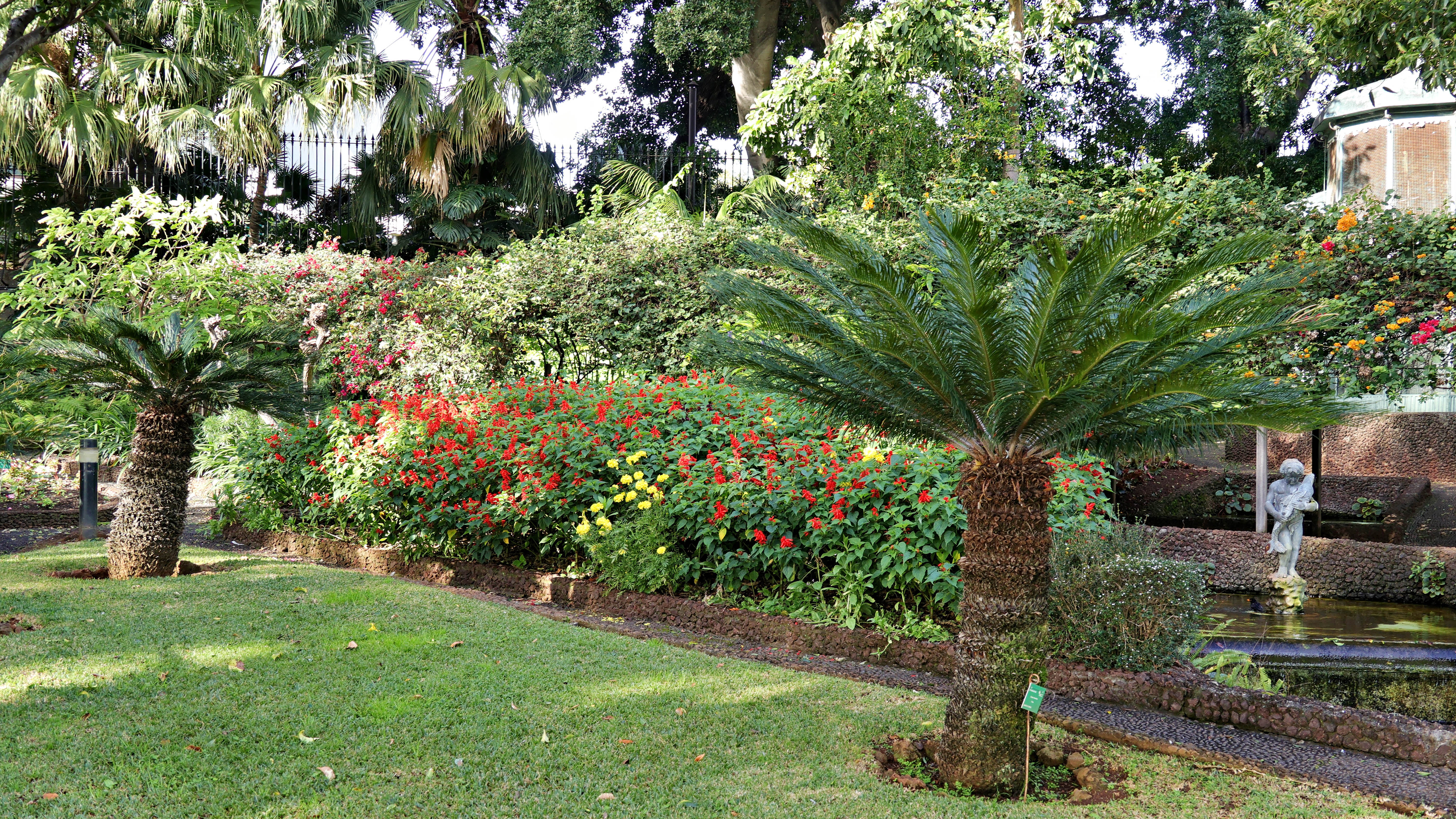
