= Flag of Madeira =

Portuguese regional flag

Madeira
- Use: Civil and state flag
- Proportion: 2∶3
- Adopted: 28 July 1978
- Design: A vertical triband of blue (hoist-side and fly-side) and gold with the cross of the Order of Christ centred on the gold band.

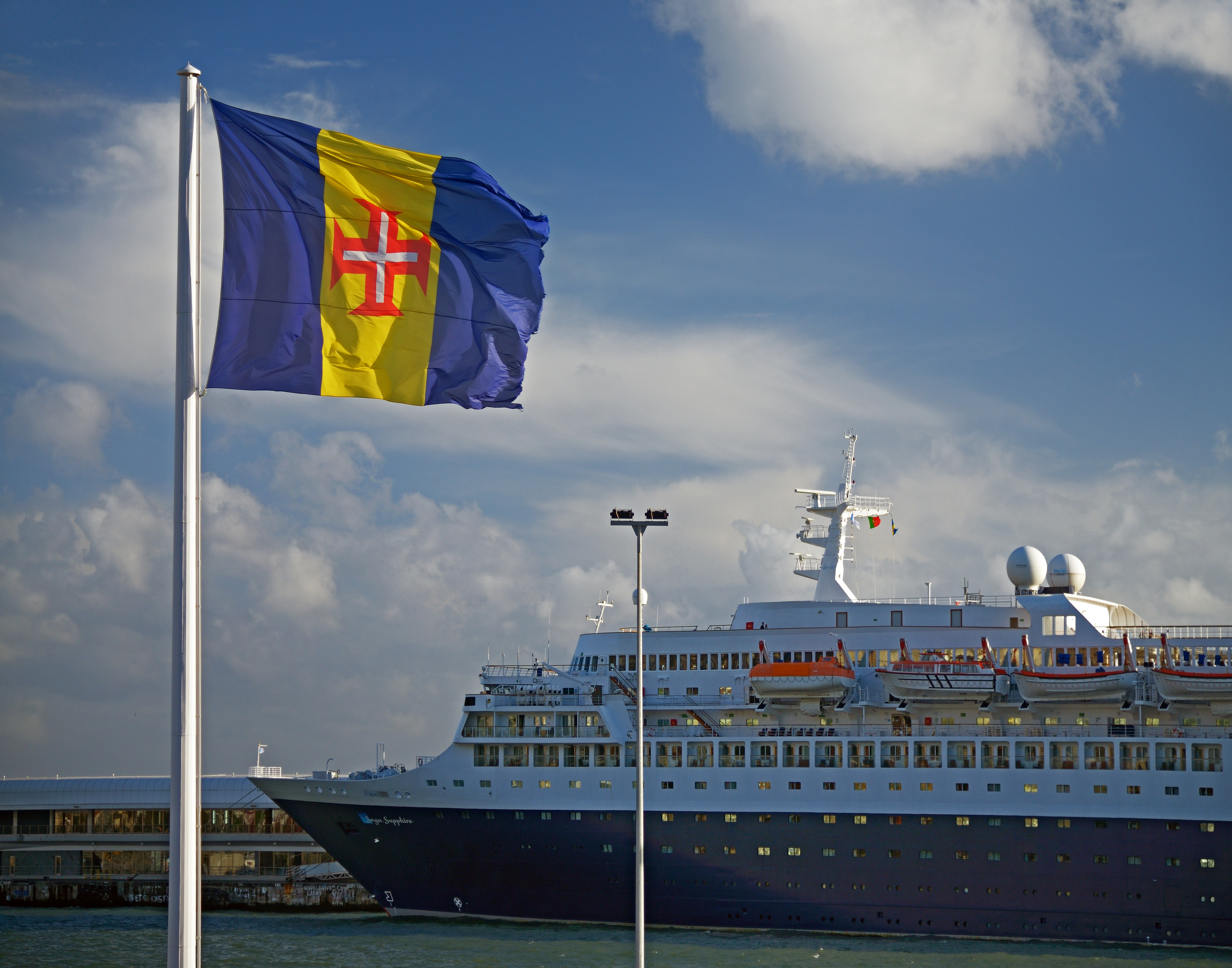
Flag of Madeira in Funchal

The flag of Madeira is the regional flag of the Portuguese Autonomous Region of the Madeira consists of a blue-gold-blue vertical triband similar to the flag of Barbados with a Cross of Christ in the center.

The regulations and clarification of the dimensions, colours and symbolism of the flag of the Autonomous Region were approved by decree of the Legislative Assembly of Madeira of July 28, 1978 (Regional Decree n. º 30/78/M of 12 September). Its use has been made possible by the Portuguese Constitution, recognizing the status of the Madeira regional autonomy arrangements subject to the Constitution itself, with subjective right Insignia badges that differentiate themselves from the rest of the Portuguese territory.

== Design ==
=== History ===
The flag of the now defunct Madeira Archipelago Liberation Front (FLAMA) is composed of a blue-yellow-blue vertical triband, and in the yellow section there are five small shields. The blue represents the environment that characterizes the island and represents nobility and serenity. The yellow mirrors the climate of the Archipelago, a symbol of richness, strength, faith and purity. The five shields are also present in the Portuguese flag, and are usually called "Quinas" when in a group.

=== Rational ===
FLAMA's flag - very similar in design to what would become the flag of the Autonomous Region of Madeira.

According to the Legislative Assembly of Madeira's reasoning, published in the Regional Decree № 30/78/M of 12 September, which adopted the current flag, the similarity of designed was justified on the following grounds the Madeirans had "a vigorous reaction, demarcated in relation to everything that was objectively wicked [PREC]." Such reaction generated among the population a "mythical vagueness typical of such historical-community phenomena" which lead Madeirans to adopt the use of blue and gold colours as identifiers for the Region.

Members of the regional parliament further argued that "such colours gained such an implantation within the Madeiran population that, repudiating the immense majority of the anti-Portugueseism of the separatists, the significance was implanted as meaning something substantial about the Autonomous Region's own personality." Therefore, any other insignias with other colours would mean nothing to the Madeirans and the separatists would develop around the blue and gold an aura of heroic clandestinity, easy and superficial attractive to the collective subconscious, to the point that they could successfully impose anti-patriotic symbology."

By adopting the blue and gold, the Region's elected representatives met the essential collective motivation and destroyed the separatist mystification, removing any identifying mark and consecrated the colours as a symbol of autonomy within of the Portuguese Republic.

=== Symbolism ===
==== Colours ====
The blue represents the environment that characterizes insularity and represents nobility, beauty and serenity. The gold mirrors the mildness of the archipelago's climate and symbolizes wealth, strength, faith, purity and constancy.

Color scheme	Red	Yellow	Blue
PMS	485 CVC	803 CVC	300 CVC
CMYK	0, 100, 100, 0	0, 0, 100, 0	100, 43, 0, 0
RGB	255, 0, 0	255, 255, 0	9, 91, 166

==== Cross of the Order of Christ ====
The Cross of the Order of Christ alludes to the following historical facts:

- The archipelago was discovered by two knights of the Household Henry the Navigator, who was Grand Master of the Military Order of Christ: João Gonçalves Zarco and Tristão Vaz Teixeira; becoming therefore a symbol of connection with Portugal;
- Since its discovery, the archipelago was property of the Order of Christ, which promoted its settlement (only in the reign of D. Manuel the archipelago was called to the direct possession of the Portuguese Crown).

== See also ==
- Coat of arms of Madeira
- Hymn of Madeira
- Knights Templar in Portugal
