= Autonomic Insignia of Good Services =

Honor awarded by Madeira

Autonomic Insignia of Good Services Insígnia autonómica de bons serviços
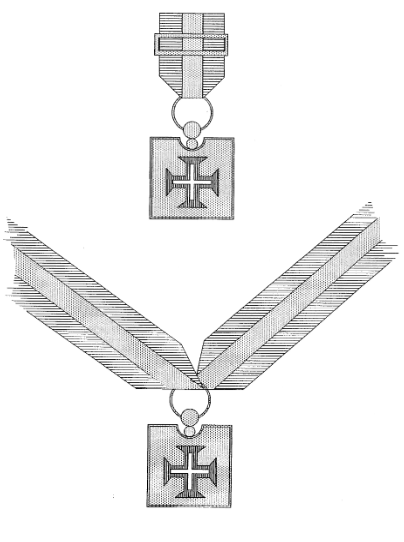
- Medal and Cordon of the Insignia

Awarded by Regional Government of Madeira
- Type: Regional Honour
- Established: 2003; 22 years ago
- Eligibility: Portuguese and Foreign citizens
- Awarded for: Those who distinguish themselves as in the performance of any public or private duties, in industrial, commercial, livestock, forestry and agricultural activities, as well as works; and civic and professional activities.
- Status: Currently constituted
- Grades: Cordon; Medal

Precedence
- Next (higher): Autonomic Insignia of Distinction
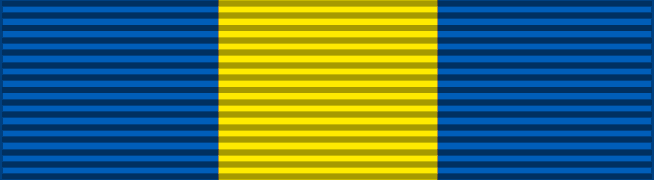
- Ribbon of the Insignia

The Autonomic Insignia of Good Services (Portuguese: Insígnia autonómica de bons serviços) is an honor awarded by the Regional Government of Madeira, which “aims to distinguish, in life or posthumously, citizens, communities or institutions that stand out for personal or institutional merits, acts, acts services rendered to the Region ”.

The insignia were established through Regional Legislative Decree n. 21/2003/M of 13 August and regulated by Regional Regulatory Decree n. 9/2004/M of 12 April.

Its attribution is decided by deliberation of the Council of the Regional Government, after receiving proposals of any member of the Regional Government or of any member of the Regional Legislative Assembly.

== Purpose ==
According to Article 6 of Regional Legislative Decree no. 21/2003/M, the Autonomic Insignia of Valour is to be bestowed to those who distinguish themselves as in the performance of any public or private duties, in industrial, commercial, livestock, forestry and agricultural activities, as well as works; and civic and professional activities.

== Awarding ==
The insignia is usually awarded on the first of July, Madeira's regional holiday.
