= Coat of arms of Madeira =

Arms

Coat of arms of the Madeira

Versions
- Lesser Coat of arms of the Autonomous Region of Madeira
- Armiger: Autonomous Region of Madeira
- Adopted: 1978
- Crest: An Armillary sphere Or
- Torse: Azure and Or
- Shield: Azure a pale Or charged with the Cross of Christ
- Supporters: Mediterranean monk seals (Monachus monachus)
- Motto: Portuguese: Das Ilhas as Mais Belas e Livres
- Other elements: Royal Helm Or
- Earlier version: The same as the current lesser arms of the Autonomous Region of Madeira
- Use: Legislative Assembly of Madeira and Regional Government of Madeira

The coat of arms of the Madeira consists of a shield azure a pale or charged with a Cross of Christ, with external elements. The shield was established by the Regional Decree 30/78/M of 12 September 1978. The external elements (supporters, crest and motto) were established by Regional Legislative Decree 11/91/M of 24 April 1991.

== Features ==
=== Interior ===
The central shield is blazoned, azure a pale or charged with a Cross of Christ.

=== Supporters ===
The Mediterranean monk seals (Monachus monachus) supporting the shield in the coat of arms are a homage to the only large mammals found by the first inhabitants of the island, and allude to the need to preserve this endangered species.

=== Crest ===
The gold armillary sphere represents the Age of Discovery, initiated by the Portuguese, and King Manuel I of Portugal who ordered the settling of the archipelago.

=== Motto ===
The Autonomous Region of Madeira motto, Das Ilhas as Mais Belas e Livres, is Portuguese for "Of all islands, the most beautiful and free".

== Symbolism ==
The use of the “toad-mouth” helmet, generally attributed to King João I, of which one exists in the Military Museum of Lisbon, was chosen given the fact that this King determined the settlement of the archipelago.

An armillary sphere, as crest, was chosen, due to its connection to the Discoveries and King Manuel I and given the fact that it is an architectural and sculptural element found in many public buildings in Funchal.

The two monk seal supports, symbolize the Region's homage to the only large mammals found when the first settlers arrived.

In 1990, the proposed motto was initially a fragment from Os Lusíadas, allusive to Madeira, “Of which we populated the first”. However, at the beginning of the following year, at a Government meeting, the chosen verse was “Of all islands, the most beautiful and free".

== See also ==
- Flag of Madeira
- Hymn of Madeira
- Knights Templar in Portugal
