= Rubina Leal =

Portuguese politician

President of the Legislative Assembly of Madeira
- Incumbent
- Assumed office 10 April 2025
- Preceded by: José Manuel Rodrigues

Member of the Legislative Assembly of Madeira
- Incumbent
- Assumed office 1 October 2017

Regional Secretary of Inclusion, Sports and Youth of Madeira
- In office 20 August 2015 – 27 July 2017
- Preceded by: Francisco Jardim Ramos
- Succeeded by: Rita Andrade

Personal details
- Born: Rubina Maria Branco Leal Vargas; 27 July 1966 Funchal, Madeira
- Party: Social Democratic Party (PSD)
- Education: ISCTE – University Institute of Lisbon
- Occupation: Sociologist

Rubina Maria Branco Leal Vargas (born 27 July 1966) is a Portuguese Madeiran sociologist and politician. On 10 April 2025, Leal was elected the first woman President of the Legislative Assembly of Madeira.

== Biography ==
Rubina Leal received her degree in sociology from the ISCTE – University Institute of Lisbon. She also holds a postgraduate degree in child protection from the Family Law Centre at the Faculty of Law at the University of Coimbra.

Leal has served as in the Legislative Assembly of Madeira since 2017 as a member of the Social Democratic Party (PSD). She was elected President of the Legislative Assembly of Madeira on 10 April 2025, becoming the first woman to serve as speaker since the autonomous government's creation in 1976. Leal received the support of 39 votes in favor and eight abstentions. She is currently serving as president of the XV Madeiran Legislature from 2025 until 2029.

In July 2026, Leal travelled Canada and the United States to meet with the Madeiran diaspora communities in both countries. Leal visited the Canadian Madeira Club in Toronto, Ontario, and the Clube Madeirense do Santíssimo Sacramento in New Bedford, Massachusetts. She was also a guest at the 100th Feast of the Blessed Sacrament in New Bedord, the largest Madeiran and Portuguese festival in the United States.
