= 2025 Madeiran regional election =

Portuguese regional election

- 23 March 2025

47 seats to the Legislative Assembly of Madeira 24 seats needed for a majority
- Opinion polls
- Turnout: 56.0% ▲2.6 pp
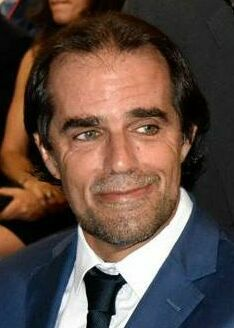

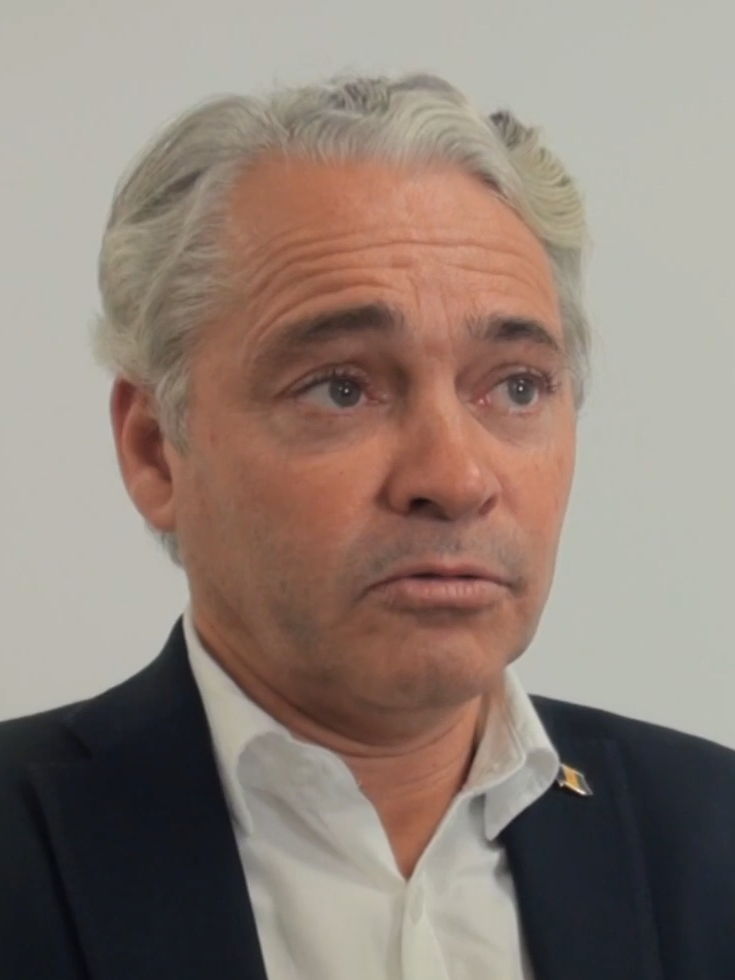

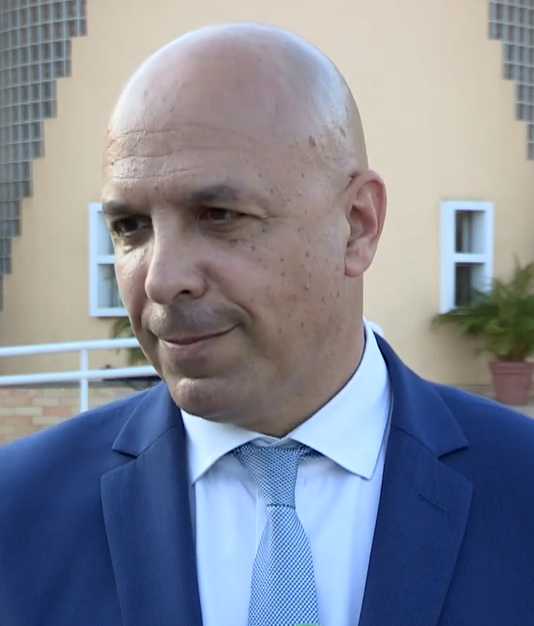

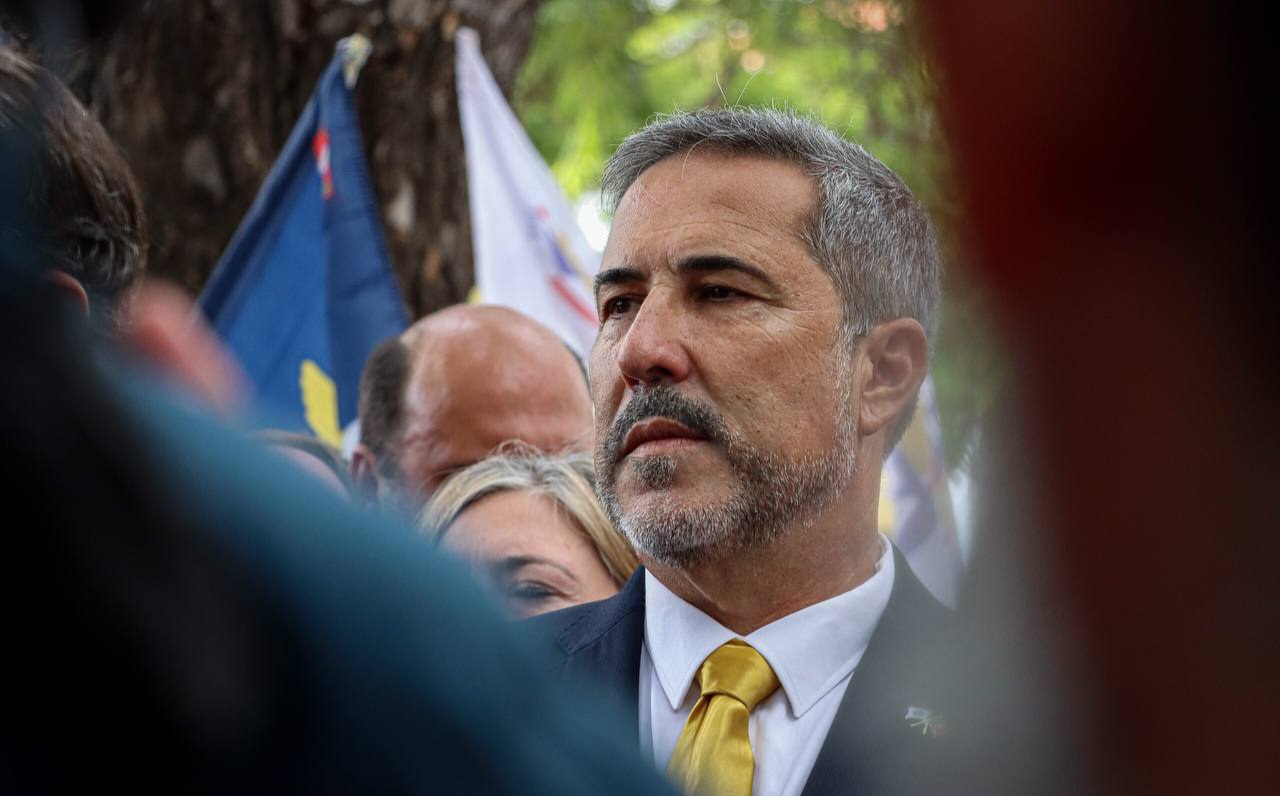

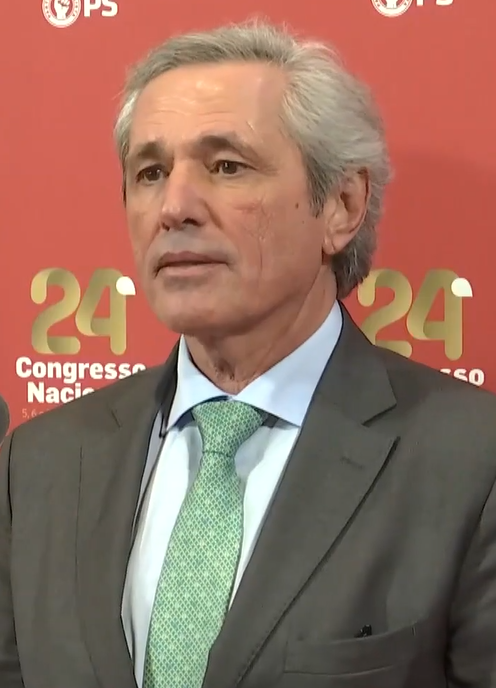

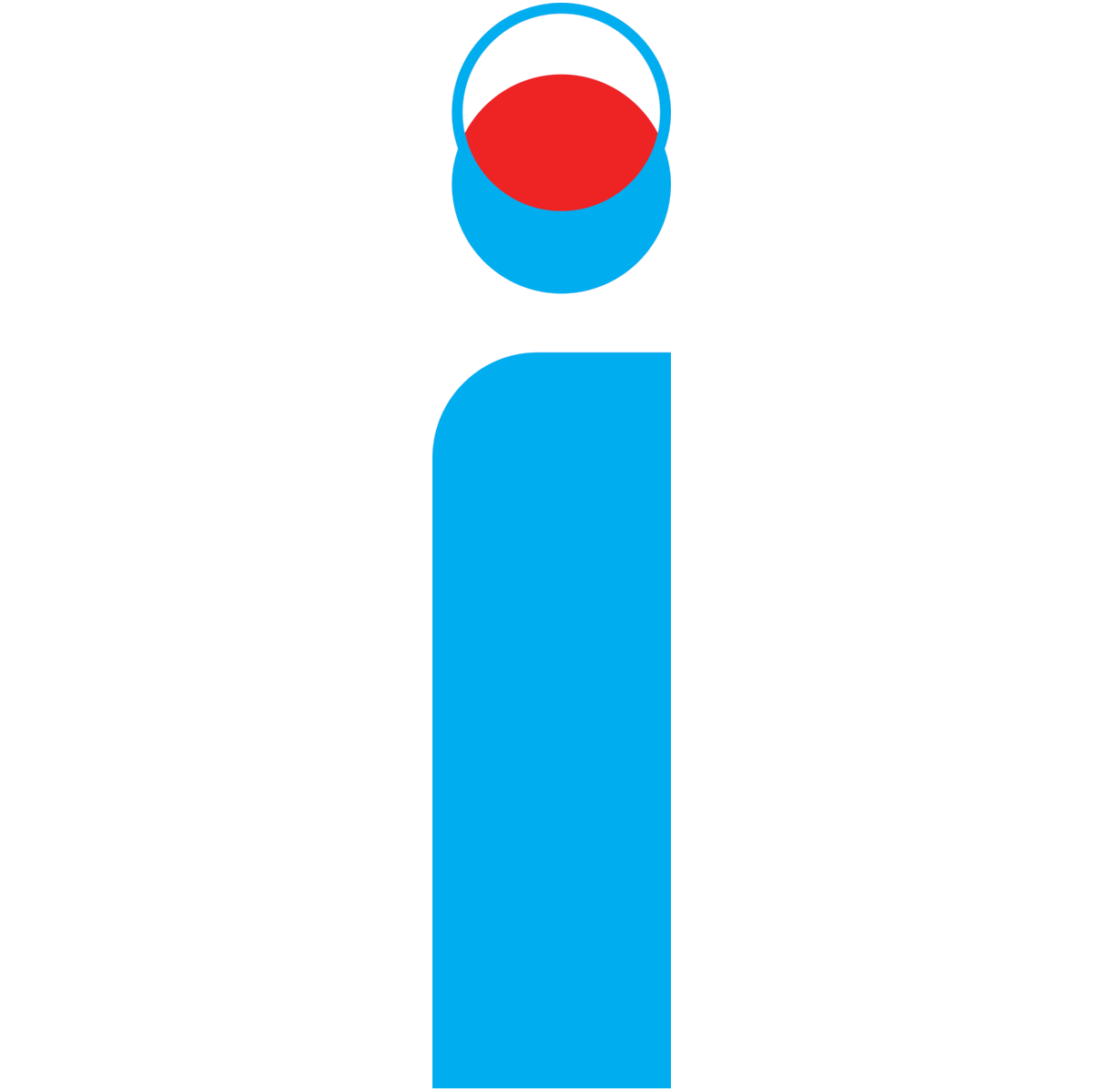

	First party	Second party	Third party
Leader	Miguel Albuquerque	Élvio Sousa	Paulo Cafôfo
Party	PSD	JPP	PS
Leader since	10 January 2015	27 January 2015	2 December 2023
Last election	19 seats, 36.1%	9 seats, 16.9%	11 seats, 21.3%
Seats won	23	11	8
Seat change	▲4	▲2	▼3
Popular vote	62,059	30,091	22,351
Percentage	43.4%	21.1%	15.6%
Swing	▲7.3 pp	▲4.2 pp	▼5.7 pp
	Fourth party	Fifth party	Sixth party
Leader	Miguel Castro	José Manuel Rodrigues	Gonçalo Maia Camelo
Party	CH	CDS–PP	IL
Leader since	12 March 2022	14 April 2024	27 July 2024
Last election	4 seats, 9.2%	2 seats, 4.0%	1 seats, 2.6%
Seats won	3	1	1
Seat change	▼1	▼1	0
Popular vote	7,821	4,289	3,097
Percentage	5.5%	3.0%	2.2%
Swing	▼3.7 pp	▼1.0 pp	▼0.4 pp
	Seventh party
Leader	Mónica Freitas
Party	PAN
Leader since	11 August 2023
Last election	1 seats, 1.9%
Seats won	0
Seat change	▼1
Popular vote	2,323
Percentage	1.6%
Swing	▼0.3 pp
- Most voted party by municipality
President before election
Miguel Albuquerque
PSD
President-designate
Miguel Albuquerque
PSD

A snap regional election was held in Madeira on 23 March 2025, to determine the composition of the Legislative Assembly of the Autonomous Region of Madeira. The election replaced all 47 members of the Madeira Assembly, and the new members will then elect the President of the Autonomous Region. This election, the third in just one year and a half, was called following the collapse of Albuquerque's government due to the approval of a motion of no confidence in December 2024.

The Social Democratic Party (PSD) won the election by a landslide, with more than 43 percent of the votes, but failed to win an absolute majority of its own by a narrow margin, electing 23 seats to the regional parliament, one short of a majority.

The Together for the People (JPP) was the other big winner of the election, by becoming the second most voted party, surpassing the Socialist Party, with 21 percent of the votes and 11 members in the regional party. The party was again the most voted in their stronghold of Santa Cruz. The Socialist Party (PS) was the big loser of the election, falling to third place, and gathering only 15.6 percent of the votes and 8 seats, losing the status of official opposition to the PSD.

Chega (CH) also lost votes and seats, falling to 5.5 percent and 3 seats, minus one compared with 2024. CDS – People's Party (CDS–PP) also lost one seat and won just 3 percent of the votes. The Liberal Initiative (IL) held on to their sole seat, with 2 percent of the votes.

People-Animals-Nature (PAN) lost its sole seat, while the Unitary Democratic Coalition (CDU) and Left Bloc (BE) failed, again, to win a seat to the Madeira assembly.

The turnout in this election increased, with 56 percent of voters casting a ballot, compared with the 53.4 percent ten months before.

== Background ==
In the 2024 election, albeit being marred in an ongoing corruption investigation, the Social Democratic Party was once again the most voted party with 36.1 percent of the votes. Despite their victory, the PSD failed to win a majority of the seats.

The Socialist Party (PS) led by former Funchal mayor Paulo Cafôfo achieved a similar result to the 2023 elections, with 21.3 percent of the votes. The big surprise of the election was the regionalist party Together for the People (JPP), who gained 4 seats from their previous 5 seats and who achieved 16.9 percent of the votes. After the election, PS and JPP struck a deal in order to make a coalition government and prevent a government led by Albuquerque, despite not having a majority.

Miguel Albuquerque negotiated a parliamentary support agreement with the CDS – People's Party (CDS–PP), their previous coalition partners, in order to form a minority government. Albuquerque was appointed as president and had to face a vote of confidence in the regional parliament.

Albuquerque presented his government programme to the speaker of the Regional Parliament, José Manuel Rodrigues, on 14 June 2024, with Miguel Albuqerque saying that policies of all Opposition parties were included in the document. However, the Socialist Party (PS), Together for the People (JPP) and Chega (CH) announced they would vote against Albuquerque in the vote of confidence on 20 June 2024, thus putting at risk the continuity of the regional government. Facing a rejection, Albuquerque withdrew, on 19 June, his programme from the assembly and announced negotiations to present a new one, thus cancelling the 20 June vote. After negotiations with Opposition parties, mainly Chega, IL, CDS–PP and PAN, Miguel Albuquerque presented, on 2 July, a new government programme that was to be voted on 4 July, but which had no certainties of passing at the moment it was presented. On 4 July 2024, Albuquerque's government passed in the regional assembly, with 22 votes in favour, from PSD, CDS–PP and PAN, 21 votes against, from PS, JPP and Chega member Magna Costa, and four abstentions by IL and the three members from Chega.

=== 2024 motion of no confidence ===
On 6 November 2024, Chega presented a motion of no confidence to bring down Miguel Albuquerque, citing the continued accusations, and investigations, of corruption against several regional secretaries and Albuquerque himself. At the same time, the Chega motion also criticized the Socialist Party (PS) for being an "accomplice" of the Social Democrats bad government, and this accusation generated divisions within the PS on what should be the party's position, with members divided between the vote in favour or abstain. However, shortly after, Chega said it was open to drop the criticisms towards the PS, and then the PS signaled it would vote in favour of the motion, which was later officially confirmed. The motion was expected to be voted on 18 November, but a PSD request to delay the vote was approved and the motion was then rescheduled for 17 December 2024. On 9 December, the proposed budget for 2025 was rejected on the first reading with the votes of all Opposition parties and the approval of only PSD and CDS–PP. On 17 December, the motion of no confidence was approved with the votes of all Opposition parties and the sole rejection of PSD and CDS–PP, thus causing the regional government to fall. After meeting with parties and the Council of State, President Marcelo Rebelo de Sousa dissolved the regional parliament and called an election for 23 March 2025.

=== Leadership changes and challenges ===
==== Liberal Initiative ====
Nuno Morna, regional party leader, announced on 16 June 2024 he was stepping down from the party's leadership, but remaining as regional Parliament member, and a leadership ballot was called for 27 July 2024. Duarte Gouveia, Morna's predecessor in the leadership post, announced his intention to return to the party's leadership. A second candidate, Gonçalo Maia Camelo, also announced his intention to run for the leadership. However, just days before the ballot, Duarte Gouveia withdrew from the race citing "lack of conditions" to campaign for the leadership. Gonçalo Maia Camelo became the sole candidate and was elected, in a closed party meeting, as new regional leader on 27 July.

==== Chega ====
The vote to decide the leadership of the Chega-Madeira party was held on September 22, 2024. There were three candidates on the ballot: Regional leader Miguel Castro; regional assembly member Magna Costa and Câmara de Lobos local assembly member José Fernandes. The ballot was quite secretive, with the media being barred from covering it, and Miguel Castro was re-elected as leader with 39 percent, followed by José Fernandes with 31 percent and Magna Costa with 28 percent. The results were the following:

Ballot: 22 September 2024
Candidate	Votes	%
Miguel Castro	39.1	
José Fernandes	31.1	
Magna Costa	27.7	
Blank/Invalid ballots	2.1	
Turnout		

Nearly five months after this ballot, in February 2025, the third-place candidate, Magna Costa, left Chega's regional parliamentary group.

==== Socialist Party ====
Regional party leader Paulo Cafôfo always rejected an internal election, pressing that he would be the party's main candidate in a snap regional elections, while his opposition, led by former leader Carlos João Pereira, demanded a leadership election. But, on 10 January 2025, Cafôfo surprised by calling a snap leadership election for 31 January, stating he was not afraid of elections. Carlos Pereira, however, rejected running in this ballot, citing the limited time to run a candidacy and that this action by Cafôfo "shames the Socialists". Paulo Cafôfo was the sole candidate on the ballot. Around 2,000 party members were registered to vote and Cafôfo was reelected with 98 percent of the votes:

Ballot: 31 January 2025
Candidate	Votes	%
Paulo Cafôfo	1,249	98.3
Blank/Invalid ballots	22	1.7
Turnout	1,271	~63.00

==== Social Democratic Party ====
In the PSD, Miguel Albuquerque's challenger in 2015 and 2024, Manuel António Correia, also pressed for a snap leadership ballot, saying that Albuquerque was the source of all the current instability in Madeira, and delivered enough signatures to ask for the calling of a ballot. Miguel Albuquerque, however, rejected any chance of calling a leadership ballot, saying it would divide the party and that there was no time available. On 16 January 2025, the PSD-Madeira Jurisdiction Board rejected the signatures and the request for a leadership ballot.

== Electoral system ==
The current 47 members of the Madeiran regional parliament are elected in a single constituency by proportional representation under the D'Hondt method, coinciding with the territory of the Region.

== Parties ==
=== Current composition ===
The table below lists parties represented in the Legislative Assembly of Madeira before the election.

Name		Ideology	Leader	2024 result		At dissolution
Name		Ideology	Leader	%	Seats	At dissolution
PPD/PSD	Social Democratic Party; Partido Social Democrata	Liberal conservatism	Miguel Albuquerque	36.1%	19 / 47	19 / 47
PS	Socialist Party; Partido Socialista	Social democracy	Paulo Cafôfo	21.3%	11 / 47	11 / 47
JPP	Together for the People; Juntos pelo Povo	Social liberalism	Élvio Sousa	16.9%	9 / 47	9 / 47
CH	Enough! Chega!	National conservatism	Miguel Castro	9.2%	4 / 47	3 / 47
CDS–PP	CDS – People's Party; Centro Democrático Social – Partido Popular	Christian democracy	José Manuel Rodrigues	4.0%	2 / 47	2 / 47
IL	Liberal Initiative; Iniciativa Liberal	Classical liberalism	Gonçalo Maia Camelo	2.6%	1 / 47	1 / 47
PAN	People Animals Nature; Pessoas Animais Natureza	Animal welfare	Mónica Freitas	1.9%	1 / 47	1 / 47
Ind.	Independent; Independente	Magna Costa (left the Chega caucus)				1 / 47

==== Seat changes ====
- On 12 February 2025, Chega member Magna Costa left the party following deep disagreements, political and personal, with the party's regional leader Miguel Castro.

=== Parties running in the election ===
14 parties and/or coalitions were on the ballot for the 2025 Madeira regional election. The parties and/or coalitions that contested the election and their lead candidates were: (parties/coalitions are ordered by how they appeared on the ballot paper)

- Unitary Democratic Coalition (CDU), Edgar Silva
- Social Democratic Party (PSD), Miguel Albuquerque
- LIVRE (L), Marta Sofia
- Together for the People (JPP), Élvio Sousa
- New Right (ND), Paulo Ricardo Azevedo
- People-Animals-Nature (PAN), Mónica Freitas
- Portuguese Labour Party/Earth Party/React, Include, Recycle Forward Madeira coalition (PTP/MPT/RIR), Raquel Coelho
- Socialist Party (PS), Paulo Cafôfo
- Liberal Initiative (IL), Gonçalo Maia Camelo
- People's Monarchist Party (PPM), Paulo Brito
- Left Bloc (BE), Roberto Almada
- Enough (CH), Miguel Castro
- National Democratic Alternative (ADN), Miguel Pita
- CDS – People's Party (CDS–PP), José Manuel Rodrigues

== Campaign ==
=== Issues ===
The campaign was dominated by the political instability in the islands, with parties taking positions for negotiations and alliances after election day. On the left, the Socialist Party (PS) called for a convergence of votes in the party, but with Together for the People (JPP) making a strong challenge. On the right, the Social Democratic Party (PSD) asked for a "comfortable majority" to govern, however, other parties said that talks with the PSD would only be possible without Albuquerque. Voter fatigue and apathy was also a source of concern due to the successive elections just in the last two years.

=== Party slogans ===
Party or alliance	Original slogan	English translation	Refs
PSD	« Vota pela Madeira »	"Vote for Madeira"	
PS	« Estabilidade e Compromisso »	"Stability and Commitment"	
JPP	« Estamos prontos! »	"We're ready!"	
CH	« Vamos limpar a Madeira de vez! »	"Let's clean up Madeira for good!"	
CDS–PP	« Sentido de responsabilidade »	"Sense of responsibility"	
IL	« Madeira com futuro »	"Madeira with a future"	
PAN	« Semear a esperança »	"Sowing hope"	
CDU	« A voz e força dos teus direitos »	"The voice and strength of your rights"	
BE	« O Bloco faz falta »	"The Bloc is needed"	
L	« Coragem para ser LIVRE »	"Courage to be FREE"	

=== Election debates ===
2025 Madeiran regional election debates
Date	Organisers	Moderator	P Present (Note: Denotes a main invitee attending the event.) S Surrogate (Note: Denotes a main invitee not attending the event, sending a surrogate in their place.) NI Not invited I Invited A Absent invitee														
Date	Organisers	Moderator	PSD	PS	JPP	CH	CDS-PP	IL	PAN	CDU	BE	FM (Note: Coalition between PTP, MPT and RIR.)	ADN	L	PPM	ND	Ref.
5 Mar	Antena 1	Paulo; Santos	NI	NI	NI	NI	NI	NI	NI	NI	NI	P Coelho	P Pita	P Sofia	P Brito	P Azevedo	
6 Mar	Antena 1	Paulo; Santos	NI	NI	NI	NI	NI	P Camelo	P Freitas	P Silva	P Almada	NI	NI	NI	NI	NI	
7 Mar	Antena 1	Paulo; Santos	P Albuquerque	P Cafôfo	P Sousa	P Castro	P Rodrigues	NI	NI	NI	NI	NI	NI	NI	NI	NI	
11 Mar	RTP; Madeira	Gil Rosa	NI	NI	NI	NI	NI	NI	NI	NI	NI	NI	P Pita	P Sofia	S Ornelas	P Azevedo	
12 Mar	RTP; Madeira	Gil Rosa	NI	NI	NI	NI	NI	P Camelo	P Freitas	P Silva	P Almada	P Coelho	NI	NI	NI	NI	
13 Mar	RTP; Madeira	Gil Rosa	P Albuquerque	P Cafôfo	P Sousa	P Castro	P Rodrigues	NI	NI	NI	NI	NI	NI	NI	NI	NI	

== Opinion polls ==
Polls that show their results without distributing those respondents who are undecided or said they would abstain from voting, are re-calculated by removing these numbers from the totals through a simple rule of three, in order to obtain results comparable to other polls and the official election results.

Exit poll

Polling firm/Link	Fieldwork date	Sample size	Turnout	PSD	CDS–PP	PS		CH	IL	PAN	CDU	BE	PTP	L	O	Lead
2025 regional election	23 March 2025	—N/a	56.0	43.4; 23	3.0; 1	15.6; 8	21.1; 11	5.5; 3	2.2; 1	1.6; 0	1.8; 0	1.1; 0	0.6; 0	0.7; 0	3.5; 0	22.3
CESOP–UCP	23 Mar 2025	12,831	53–59	41–46; 21/24	1–4; 0/2	14–18; 7/10	18–22; 9/12	4–7; 2/4	1–4; 0/2	1–3; 0/1	1–3; 0/1	1–2; 0/1	—N/a	—N/a	—N/a	23; 24
Aximage (Note: Results presented here exclude undecideds (12.5%). With their inclusion results are: PSD: 33.8%; PS: 18.6%; JPP: 17.5%; CH 7.3%; CDS-PP: 2.3%; IL: 1.3%; BE: 1.3%; PAN: 1.1%; CDU: 1.0%; Livre: 0.3%; Others/Invalid: 3.0%)	7–17 Mar 2025	561	?	38.6; 21	2.6; 1	21.3; 11	20.0; 10	8.3; 4	1.5; 0	1.3; 0	1.1; 0	1.5; 0	—N/a	0.3; 0	3.4; 0	17.3
Intercampus (Note: Results presented here exclude undecideds (18.0%). With their inclusion results are: PSD: 38.4%; PS: 16.7%; JPP: 10.7%; CH 5.4%; IL: 2.8%; CDS-PP: 2.5%; CDU: 1.8%; PAN: 1.7%; BE: 1.4%; Livre: 0.8%)	5–13 Mar 2025	801	?	46.7; 24	3.0; 1	20.3; 10	13.0; 6	6.6; 3	3.4; 1	2.1; 1	2.2; 1	1.7; 0	—N/a	1.0; 0	—N/a	26.4
Intercampus (Note: Results presented here exclude undecideds (17.9%) and those who would not vote (9.6%). With their inclusion results are: PSD: 28.0%; PS: 15.3%; JPP: 11.0%; CH 5.1%; IL: 3.1%; CDS-PP: 3.1%; BE: 1.6%; PAN: 1.5%; PTP: 1.2%; Others/Invalid: 2.4%)	29 Nov–7 Dec 2024	803	?	38.7; 20	4.3; 2	21.2; 11	15.2; 7	7.1; 3	4.3; 2	2.1; 1	—N/a	2.2; 1	1.7; 0	—N/a	3.3; 0	17.5
Aximage (Note: Results presented here exclude undecideds (15.6%). With their inclusion results are: PSD: 31.5%; PS: 16.2%; JPP: 15.4%; CH 9.5%; IL: 3.4%; CDS-PP: 2.7%; PAN: 2.2%; Others/Invalid: 3.3%)	30 Nov–6 Dec 2024	458	?	37.4; 19	3.2; 1	19.2; 10	18.3; 9	11.3; 5	4.0; 2	2.6; 1	—N/a	—N/a	—N/a	—N/a	3.9; 0	18.2
2024 EP election	9 Jun 2024	—N/a	41.6	42.7 (23)		26.0 (14)	—N/a	9.1 (4)	5.4 (2)	1.9 (1)	1.9 (1)	2.9 (1)	1.6 (0)	1.7 (0)	6.8 (1)	16.7
2024 regional election	26 May 2024	—N/a	53.4	36.1; 19	4.0; 2	21.3; 11	16.9; 9	9.2; 4	2.6; 1	1.9; 1	1.6; 0	1.4; 0	0.9; 0	0.7; 0	3.3; 0	14.8

== Voter turnout ==
The table below shows voter turnout throughout election day.

Turnout	Time								
Turnout	12:00			16:00			19:00		
Turnout	2024	2025	±	2024	2025	±	2024	2025	±
Total	20.22%	22.10%	▲1.88 pp	40.52%	42.48%	▲1.96 pp	53.40%	55.98%	▲2.58 pp

== Results ==
Summary of the 23 March 2025 Legislative Assembly of Madeira elections results
Parties	Votes	%	±pp swing	MPs				
Parties	Votes	%	±pp swing	2024	2025	±	%	±
Social Democratic	62,059	43.41	▲7.3	19	23	▲4	48.94	▲8.5
Together for the People	30,091	21.05	▲4.2	9	11	▲2	23.40	▲4.3
Socialist	22,351	15.63	▼5.7	11	8	▼3	17.02	▼6.4
Chega	7,821	5.47	▼3.8	4	3	▼1	6.38	▼2.1
People's	4,289	3.00	▼1.0	2	1	▼1	2.13	▼2.1
Liberal Initiative	3,097	2.17	▼0.4	1	1	0	2.13	0.0
Unitary Democratic Coalition	2,543	1.78	▲0.2	0	0	0	0.00	0.0
People-Animals-Nature	2,323	1.62	▼0.3	1	0	▼1	0.00	▼2.1
Left Bloc	1,586	1.11	▼0.3	0	0	0	0.00	0.0
LIVRE	959	0.67	▲0.0	0	0	0	0.00	0.0
Forward Madeira (PTP/MPT/RIR)	790	0.55	▼1.2	0	0	0	0.00	0.0
National Democratic Alternative	691	0.48	▼0.1	0	0	0	0.00	0.0
People's Monarchist	576	0.40	—N/a	—N/a	0	—N/a	0.00	—N/a
New Right	487	0.34	—N/a	—N/a	0	—N/a	0.00	—N/a
Total valid	139,663	97.69	▼0.2	47	47	0	100.00	0.0
Blank ballots	715	0.50	▲0.0					
Invalid ballots	2,581	1.81	▲0.2					
Total	142,959	100.00						
Registered voters/turnout	255,380	55.98	▲2.6					

Vote share
PSD	43.41%
JPP	21.05%
PS	15.63%
CH	5.47%
CDS–PP	3.00%
IL	2.17%
CDU	1.78%
PAN	1.62%
BE	1.11%
Others	2.44%
Blank/Invalid	2.31%

Parliamentary seats
PSD	48.94%
JPP	23.40%
PS	17.02%
CH	6.38%
CDS–PP	2.13%
IL	2.13%

=== Maps ===
Most voted political force by municipality.

== Aftermath ==
With the Social Democrats near absolute majority result, the party only needed one seat to form a majority, the preferred partner for a coalition would be CDS – People's Party (CDS–PP). On the day after election day, Miguel Albuquerque confirmed negotiations with CDS–PP were taking place and that a deal could be announced on the following day, 25 March. On 25 March, PSD and CDS–PP signed a coalition government deal, securing a majority of 24 seats in the regional assembly. After meeting with parties represented in the regional assembly, during 28 March, the Representative of the Republic, Ireneu Barreto, nominated Miguel Albuquerque as President of the Regional Government. The PSD/CDS–PP coalition government was sworn in to office on 15 April 2025.

=== Government approval ===
On 8 May 2025, the regional assembly approved the PSD/CDS–PP coalition government with the votes in favour of PSD and CDS–PP; the votes against of PS, JPP and Chega; and with the abstention of IL.

2025 Motion of confidence Miguel Albuquerque (PSD)
Ballot →	8 May 2025
Required majority →	Simple
Yes: • PSD (23); • CDS–PP (1)	24 / 47
No: • JPP (11); • PS (8); • CH (3)	22 / 47
Abstentions: • IL (1)	1 / 47
Absentees	0 / 47
Result →	Approved
