= José Manuel Rodrigues (politician) =

Portuguese politician

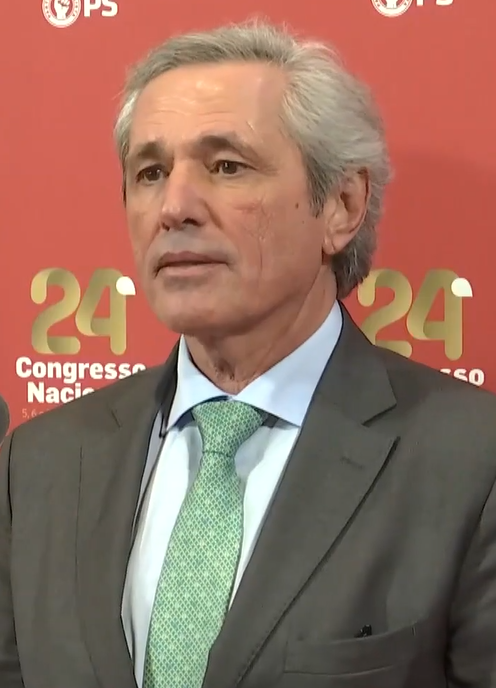
- José Manuel Rodrigues in 2024

Regional Secretary of Economy
- Incumbent
- Assumed office 15 April 2025
- President: Miguel Albuquerque
- Preceded by: Eduardo Jesus

President of the Legislative Assembly of Madeira
- In office 15 October 2019 – 10 April 2025
- Preceded by: José Lino Tranquada Gomes
- Succeeded by: Rubina Leal

Member of the Legislative Assembly of Madeira
- Incumbent
- Assumed office 17 September 2012
- In office 13 October 1996 – 14 October 2009

President of the CDS – People's Party of Madeira
- Incumbent
- Assumed office 14 April 2024
- Preceded by: Rui Barreto
- In office 1997–2015
- Preceded by: Rui Gomes Vieira
- Succeeded by: Rui Barreto

Member of the Assembly of the Republic
- In office 15 October 2009 – 16 September 2012
- Constituency: Madeira

Member of the Funchal City Council
- In office 29 September 2013 – 1 October 2017

Personal details
- Born: José Manuel de Sousa Rodrigues; 13 July 1960 (age 66) Funchal, Madeira, Portugal
- Party: CDS – People's Party
- Spouse: Daniela Rodrigues
- Occupation: Journalist • politician

José Manuel de Sousa Rodrigues (born 13 July 1960) is a Portuguese journalist and politician, from the CDS – People's Party. From 2019 until 2025, he served as the President of the Legislative Assembly of Madeira.

He was successively elected as a member of the Legislative Assembly of Madeira since 1996. He was parliamentary leader several times.

In 2009, he was elected as a member of the Assembly of the Republic, being re-elected in the early elections of June 2011. Here, he served as vice-president of the CDS-PP Parliamentary group.

In 2019, José Manuel Rodrigues was elected President of the Legislative Assembly of Madeira for the XII legislature (2019–2023). In 2023, he was re-elected President of the Legislative Assembly of Madeira for the XIII legislature.

After the 2025 Madeiran regional election, José Manuel Rodrigues formed a coalition with the Social Democratic Party (PSD), becoming Regional Secretary for the Economy in the regional government, leaving the post of President of the Legislative Assembly of Madeira.
