= Regional Government of Madeira =

Madeira regional government

Government of the Autonomous Region of Madeira
- Governo da Região Autónoma da Madeira
- Coat of arms of Madeira

Overview
- Established: 1976; 50 years ago
- Country: Portugal
- Polity: Madeira
- Leader: Miguel Albuquerque, President of the Regional Government
- Appointed by: Representative of the Republic
- Responsible to: Regional Legislative Assembly
- Annual budget: €1,915,009,000 (2019)
- Headquarters: Quinta Vigia – Avenida do Infante 1, Funchal
- Website: www.madeira.gov.pt

The Government of the Autonomous Region of Madeira is the local government of this Portuguese autonomous region.

The Regional Government is one of the two organs of self-government of the Autonomous Region along with the Regional Legislative Assembly, to which it is politically accountable.

The President of the Regional Government is appointed by the Representative of the Republic in light of the results of the elections to the Regional Legislative Assembly. The remaining members of the Regional Government are appointed and discharged by the Representative of the Republic upon proposal of the Government's President. The dissolution of the Regional Legislative Assembly causes the removal of the Regional Government.

== Powers ==
According to article 60 of the Political-Administrative Statute of the Autonomous Region of Madeira, the Regional Government is to exercise the following powers:

- Exercise its own executive power;
- Manage and dispose of the regional estate and celebrate the acts and contracts in which the Region has an interest;
- Administer, in accordance with the Statute and the Finance Law of the Autonomous Regions, the tax revenues collected or generated in the Region, as well as to participate in Portugal's tax revenues, and other revenues that are attributed to it and allocate them to its expenses;
- Exercise supervisory power over local authorities;
- Superintend in services, public institutes and public and nationalized companies that exercise their activity exclusively or predominantly in the Region, and in other cases where the regional interest justifies it;
- Participate in the definition and implementation of tax, monetary, financial and foreign exchange policies, in order to ensure regional control of the means of payment in circulation and the financing of investments necessary for the economic and social development of the Region;
- Participate in the definition of policies regarding territorial waters, the exclusive economic zone and the adjacent seabed;
- Participate in the negotiation of international treaties and agreements that directly concern the Region and manage the benefits arising from them;
- Establish cooperation with other foreign regional entities and participate in organizations whose object is to foster interregional dialogue and cooperation, in accordance with the guidelines defined by the sovereign bodies with competence in matters of foreign policy;
- Pronounce, on its own initiative or in consultation with the sovereign bodies, on matters within the competence of these concerning the Region, as well as in the definition of the positions of the Portuguese State in the context of the process of European construction in matters of specific interest to the Region;
- Participate in the process of European construction, through representation in the respective regional institutions and in the delegations involved in community decision-making processes, when matters of specific regional interest are at stake;
- Conduct the policy of the Region, defending democratic legality;
- Participate in the preparation of national plans;
- Regulate regional legislation;
- Approve its own organization and operation;
- Prepare the necessary regulations for the proper functioning of the regional administration;
- Directing regional administration services and activities;
- Elaborate its Program and present it, for approval, to the Legislative Assembly;
- Present to the Legislative Assembly proposals for regional legislative decrees and draft laws;
- Elaborate the proposals for the region's economic and social development plan;
- Prepare the budget proposal and submit it to the Legislative Assembly for approval;
- Present to the Legislative Assembly the accounts of the Region;
- Adopt the necessary measures for the promotion and economic and social development and the satisfaction of regional collective needs;
- Coordinate the regional Plan and Budget and ensure its good execution;
- Proceed to civil requisition and expropriation for public benefit, under the terms of the law;
- Perform all acts required by law with respect to officials and agents of the regional administration;
- Exercise the other executive functions that are committed by law.

== Current Government ==
Cabinet members
Portfolio	Minister	Took office	Left office	Party
President	Miguel Albuquerque	15 April 2025	Incumbent	PSD
Regional Secretary of Education, Science and Technology	Elsa Fernandes	12 September 2025	Incumbent	Independent
Regional Secretary of Tourism, Culture and the Environment	Eduardo Jesus	15 April 2025	Incumbent	PSD
Regional Secretary of Economy	José Manuel Rodrigues	15 April 2025	Incumbent	CDS–PP
Regional Secretary of Health and Civil Protection	Micaela Freitas	15 April 2025	Incumbent	PSD
Regional Secretary of Inclusion, Labour and Youth	Paula Margarido	15 April 2025	Incumbent	PSD
Regional Secretary of Finance	Duarte Freitas	15 April 2025	Incumbent	Independent
Regional Secretary of Agriculture and Fisheries	Nuno Maciel	15 April 2025	Incumbent	PSD
Regional Secretary of Facilities and Infrastructure	Pedro Rodrigues	15 April 2025	Incumbent	Independent

== Historical buildings ==
Quinta Vigia serves as the seat of the Presidency of the Government of the Autonomous Region of Madeira.

In the historic centre of Funchal, next to the Cathedral, stands the Building of the Regional Government of Madeira. This property was erected in the 17th century to house the Santa Casa da Misericórdia do Funchal and its hospital, having undergone numerous changes since then until the 20th century. Currently, different regional public services are based in this space.
