= Hino da Região Autónoma da Madeira =

Anthem of the Portuguese Autonomous Region of Madeira

English: Anthem of the Autonomous Region of Madeira
- Regional anthem of Madeira
- Lyrics: Ornelas Teixeira, 1980
- Music: João Víctor Costa, 1980
- Adopted: 16 September 1980

Audio sample
- Hino da Região Autónoma da Madeira (instrumental): file; help

The Hino da Região Autónoma da Madeira (English: Anthem of the Autonomous Region of Madeira) is the official anthem of Madeira, an autonomous North Atlantic archipelago of Portugal. It was adopted in 1980, through Regional Decree 12/80/M of September 16. The lyrics are by Ornelas Teixeira and the music by João Víctor Costa.

The anthem is performed at official ceremonies, such as flag salutes or for the President of the Legislative Assembly or the Regional Government.

== History ==
The anthem was composed by João Víctor Costa (1939–2018), who was a composer and tenor from Estreito de Câmara de Lobos, on southern Madeira Island. Victor Costa studied singing and piano at the Diocesan Seminary of Funchal and the Academy of Music and Arts of Madeira. He later got a scholarship at the Calouste Gulbenkian Foundation and went to Munich, Germany. He composed hundreds of pieces, including 16 hymns and more than 100 classical songs, and created nine choirs. He was honoured by Câmara de Lobos City Council, Madeira's Conservatory of Music and Funchal City Hall in 2011, 2015 and 2016, respectively.

== Lyrics ==
Portuguese original

I
Do vale à montanha e do mar à serra,
Teu povo humilde, estóico e valente
Entre a rocha dura te lavrou a terra,
Para lançar, do pão, a semente:

II
Herói do trabalho na montanha agreste,
Que se fez ao mar em vagas procelosas:
Os louros da vitória, em tuas mãos calosas
Foram a herança que a teus filhos deste.

Coro:
Por esse Mundo além
Madeira teu nome continua
Em teus filhos saudosos
Que além fronteiras
De ti se mostram orgulhosos.

Por esse Mundo além,
Madeira, honraremos tua História
Na senda do trabalho
Nós lutaremos
Alcançaremos
Teu bem-estar e glória.

IPA transcription (Note: See Help:IPA/Portuguese and Portuguese phonology.)

1
[du ˈva.ɫ‿a mõ.ˈtɐ.ɲɐ i du maɾ a ˈsɛ.ʁɐ]
[tew ˈpo.vu‿u.ˈmiɫ.dɨ ɨʃ.ˈtɔj.ku‿i vɐ.ˈɫẽ.tɨ]
[ˈẽ.tɾɨ‿ɐ ˈʁɔ.ʃɐ ˈdu.ɾɐ tɨ ɫɐv.ˈɾo(w) ɐ ˈtɛ.ʁɐ]
[ˈpɐ.ɾɐ ɫɐ̃.ˈsaɾ du pɐ̃w̃ ɐ sɨ.ˈmẽ.tɨ]

2
[e.ˈɾɔj du tɾɐ.ˈba.ʎu nɐ mõ.ˈtɐ.ɲɐ‿ɐ.ˈɡɾɛʃ.tɨ]
[kɨ sɨ fez aw maɾ ɐ̃j̃ ˈva.ɡɐʃ pɾu.sɨ.ˈɫo.zɐʃ]
[uʒ ˈlo(w).ɾuʒ dɐ vi.ˈtɔ.ɾjɐ ɐ̃j̃ ˈtu.ɐʒ mɐ̃w̃ʃ kɐ.ˈɫo.zɐʃ]
[ˈfo.ɾɐ̃w̃ ɐ‿e.ˈɾɐ̃.sɐ kɨ‿ɐ tewʃ ˈfi.ʎuʒ ˈdeʃ.tɨ]

[ko.ɾu]
[puɾ ˈe.sɨ ˈmũ.du‿a.ˈɫɐ̃j̃]
[mɐ.ˈdɐj.ɾɐ tew ˈno.mɨ kõ.ti.ˈnu.ɐ]
[ɐ̃j̃ tewʃ ˈfi.ʎuʃ sɐw.ˈdo.zuʃ]
[kɨ‿a.ˈɫɐ̃j̃ fɾõ.ˈtɐj.ɾɐʒ]
[dɨ ti sɨ ˈmɔs.tɾɐ̃w̃ oɾ.gu.ˈʎo.zuʃ]

[puɾ ˈe.sɨ ˈmũ.du‿a.ˈɫɐ̃j̃]
[mɐ.ˈdɐj.ɾɐ‿õ.ʁɐ.ˈɾe.muʃ ˈtu.ɐ‿iʃ.ˈtɔ.ɾjɐ]
[nɐ ˈsẽ.dɐ du tɾɐ.ˈba.ʎu]
[nɔʒ ɫu.tɐ.ˈɾe.muz]
[aɫ.kɐ̃.sɐ.ˈɾe.muʃ]
[tew bɐ̃j̃.ɨʃ.ˈtaɾ i ˈɡɫɔ.ɾjɐ]

English translation

I
From the valley to the mountain and from the sea to the highlands,
Your humble, stoic and brave people
Between the hard rock the earth ploughed you,
To cast, from the bread, the seed:

II
Hero of labour in the harsh mountain,
Which made itself to the sea in tempestuous waves:
The laurels of victory, in your callous hands,
Were the heritage that you gave your children.

Chorus:
For this World beyond
Madeira your name continues
In your longing children
That beyond borders
Show themselves proud of you.

For this World beyond,
Madeira, we will honour your history
In the path of labour
We will struggle
Will reach
Your well-being and glory.
