= List of mountains in Portugal =

This is a list of the mountains in Portugal, including the mountains with more than 1,400 metres (4,600 ft) of elevation and with, at least, 100 metres (330 ft) of topographic prominence.

Mountains and hills occupy most of the territory of Portugal. The highest Portuguese mountain is Mount Pico in the Azores islands, with 2,351 metres (7,713 ft). The highest peak in Mainland Portugal is Torre in the Serra da Estrela range, with 1,993 metres (6,539 ft).

Historically, during most of the 20th century, the Mount Tatamailau, in the former Portuguese Timor, with 2,986 metres (9,797 ft), was the highest Portuguese mountain.

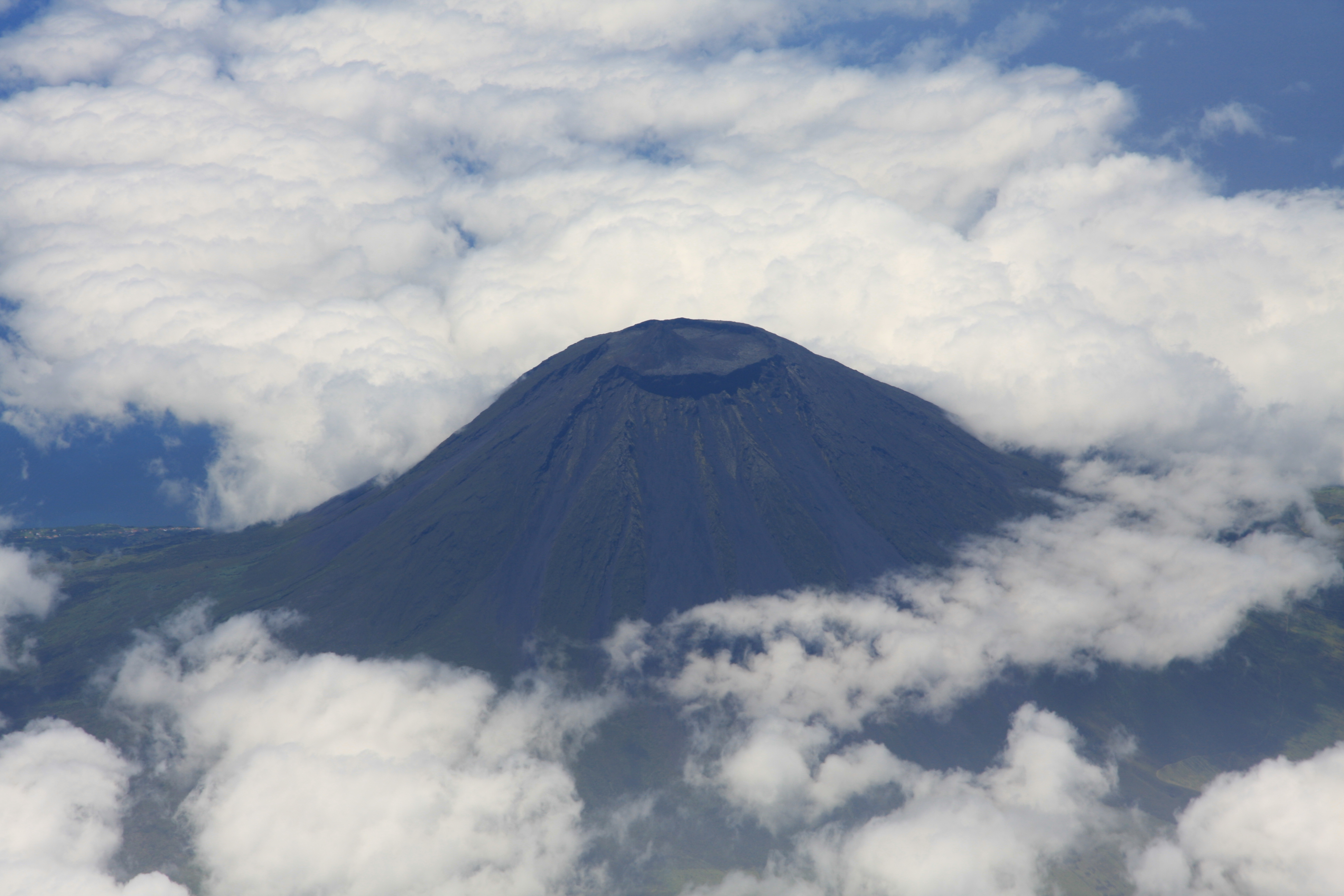
Mount Pico (2,351 m, 7,713 ft) at Pico Island, the highest mountain of Portugal.

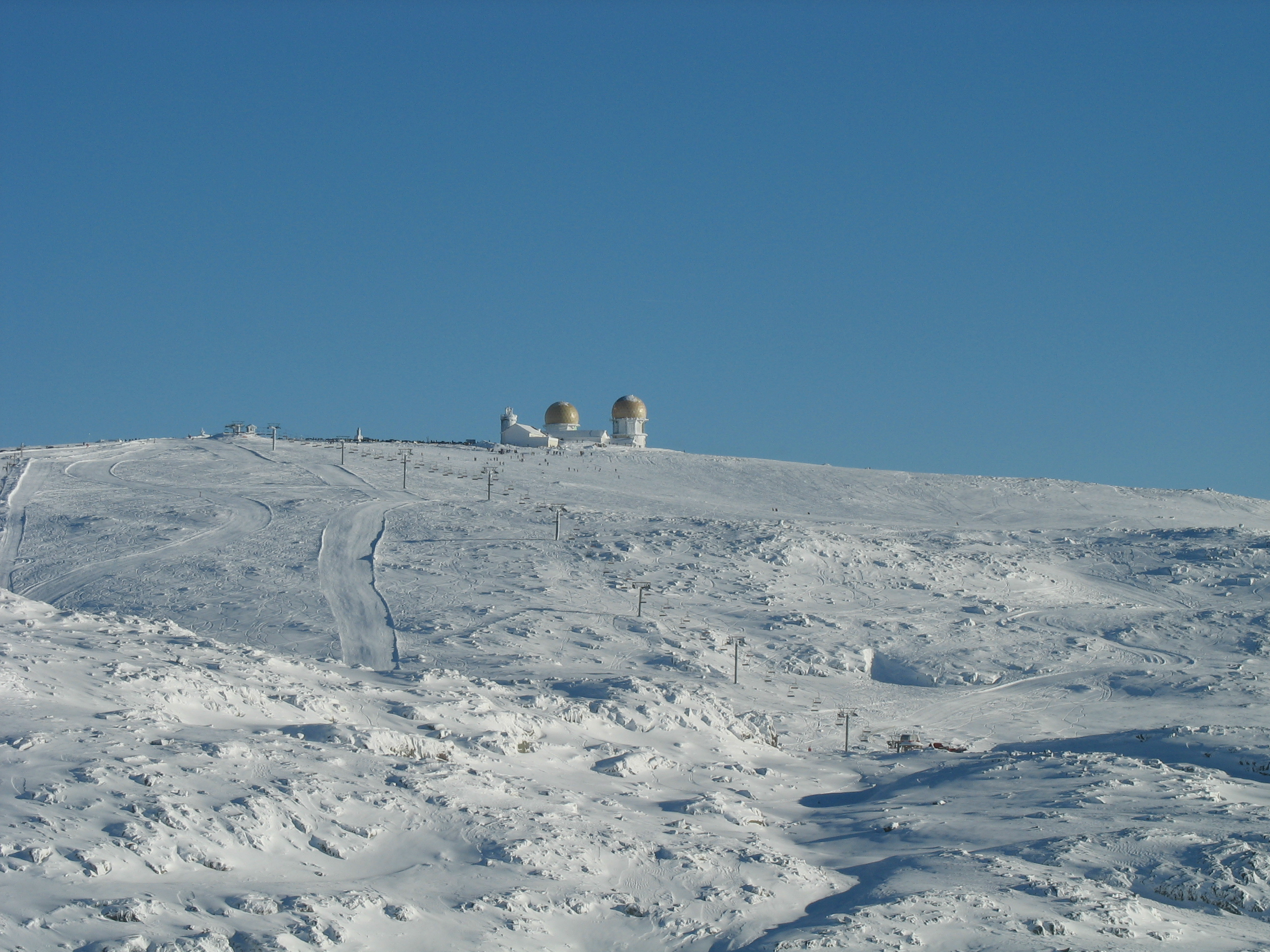
Torre (1,993 m, 6,539 ft) at Serra da Estrela, the highest point in Mainland Portugal.

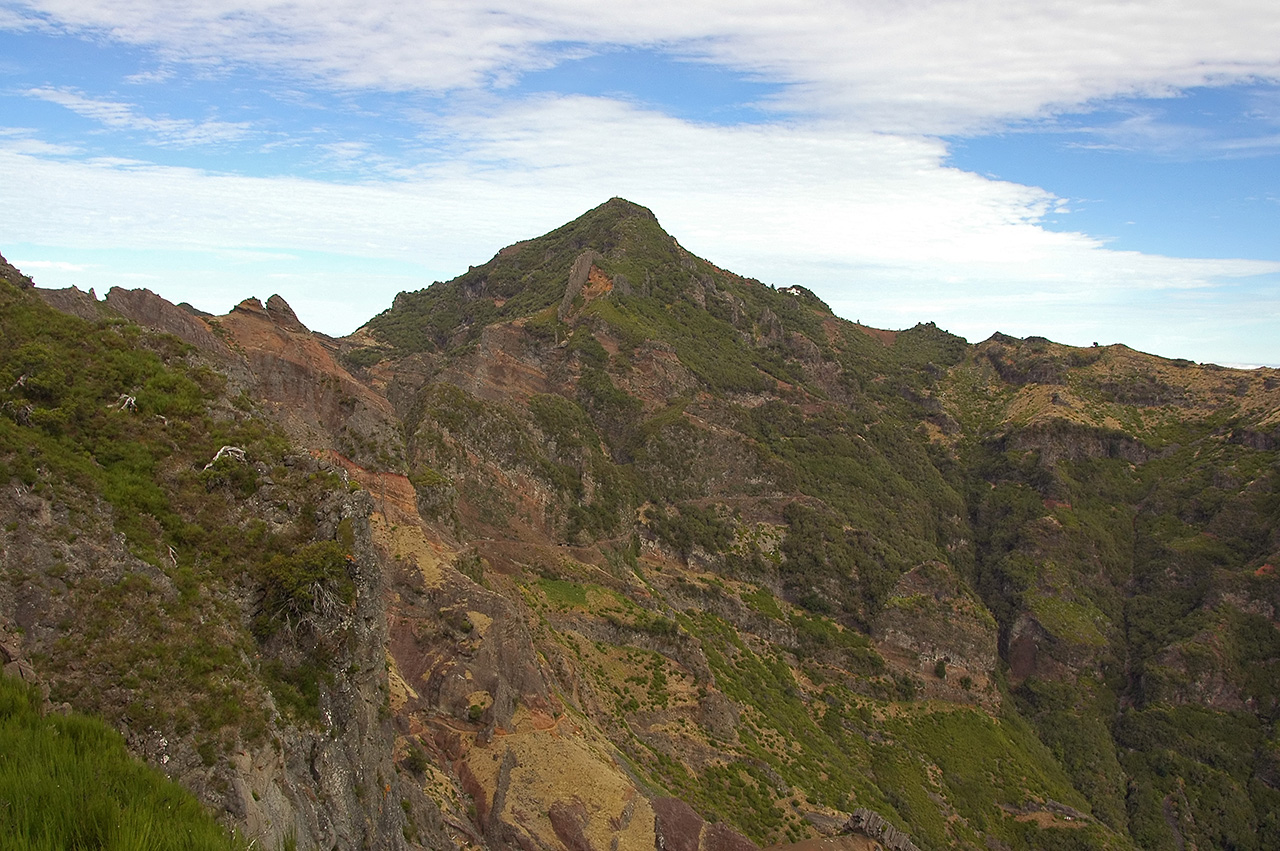
Pico Ruivo (1,861 m, 6,106 ft), the highest peak of Madeira Island and the third highest of Portugal.

List of mountains in Portugal
Name	Mountain range	Elevation (m)
Pico	Pico Island, Azores	2,351 metres (7,713 ft)
Torre	Serra da Estrela	1,993 metres (6,539 ft)
Pico Ruivo	Madeira Island	1,861 metres (6,106 ft)
Pico das Torres	Madeira Island	1,851 metres (6,073 ft)
Pico do Arieiro	Madeira Island	1,818 metres (5,965 ft)
Cidrão	Madeira Island	1,802 metres (5,912 ft)
Cedro	Madeira Island	1,759 metres (5,771 ft)
Alto da Pedrice / Poio da Cabeça	Serra da Estrela	1,758 metres (5,768 ft)
Casado	Madeira Island	1,725 metres (5,659 ft)
Poios Brancos	Serra da Estrela	1,704 metres (5,591 ft)
Santinha	Serra da Estrela	1,595 metres (5,233 ft)
Nevosa	Serra do Gerês	1,548 metres (5,079 ft)
Larouco	Serra do Larouco	1,536 metres (5,039 ft)
São Bento	Serra da Estrela	1,530 metres (5,020 ft)
Taloeiros / Cabeço dos Pinheiros	Serra da Estrela	1,517 metres (4,977 ft)
Lombada Grande	Serra de Montesinho	1,486 metres (4,875 ft)
Outeiro do Pássaro / Coções do Concelinho	Serra do Gerês	1,482 metres (4,862 ft)
Alto da Amoreira / Laje do Sino	Serra do Gerês	1,463 metres (4,800 ft)
Fonte Fria	Serra do Gerês	1,458 metres (4,783 ft)
Borrageiro	Serra do Gerês	1,430 metres (4,690 ft)
Alto de Candal	Serra do Gerês	1,423 metres (4,669 ft)
Cebola	Serra do Açor	1,418 metres (4,652 ft)
Pedrada	Serra do Soajo	1,416 metres (4,646 ft)
Marão	Serra do Marão	1,416 metres (4,646 ft)
Rochão	Serra do Gerês	1,401 metres (4,596 ft)

== See also ==
- Geography of Portugal
