= Achada do Teixeira =

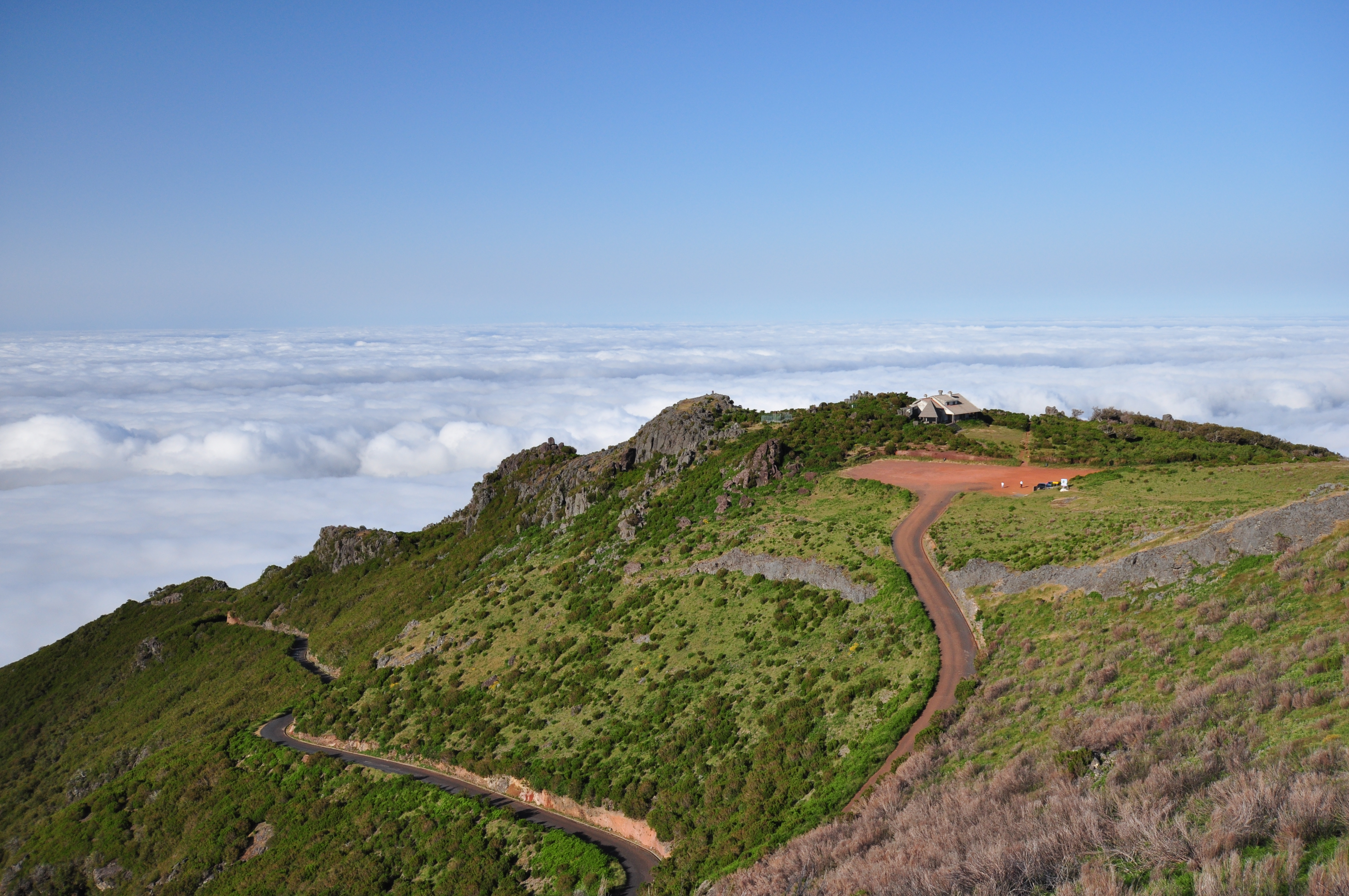
- View of Achada do teixeira, and access via ER 218, from the trail to Pico Ruivo

Highest point
- Elevation: 1,600 m (5,200 ft)
- Prominence: 2 m (6.6 ft)
- Parent peak: Encumeada Baixa
- Isolation: 84 m
- Coordinates: 32°45′52″N 16°55′21″W

Geography
- Location within Madeira
- Location: Santana, Madeira, Portugal

Achada do Teixeira (European Portuguese pronunciation: [ɐˈʃaðɐ ðu tɐjˈʃɐjɾɐ]) is a mountain and a settlement of the freguesia (parish) of Santana, of the municipality of Santana, Ilha da Madeira. It has a natural attraction in basalt stone which is called the "standing man" ("homem em pé" in Portuguese). From here the main access to Pico Ruivo departs via the trail PR1.2 Vereda do Pico Ruivo. This place has a car park to support visitors. There is a division between three parishes in the municipality of Santana that converge there, Santana, Faial, Ilha.

Since 2002, the Astronomy Group of the University of Madeira has held its traditional AstroFesta in this place. In fact, the area surrounding Achada do Teixeira is among the best places for astronomical observation at national level. A little further up is the plateau of Encumeada Alta, one of the best places in the Northern Hemisphere to do astronomy, already located in the parish of Faial.

There are plans to install a small robotic observatory next to Achada do Teixeira. A cement base has already been built for this purpose.
