= List of volcanoes in Portugal =

Although there are no active volcanoes in the continental territory of Portugal, apart from geological remnants of ancient volcanism, the Portuguese Atlantic island possessions have a long history of active volcanism. The following is a list of active and extinct volcanoes in the Portuguese territories of the Azores and Madeira.

== Azores ==
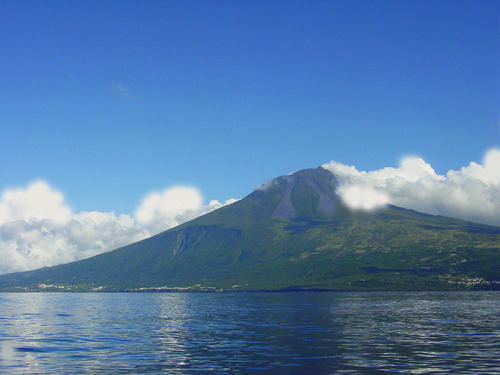
The largest volcano in the Azores: Mount Pico

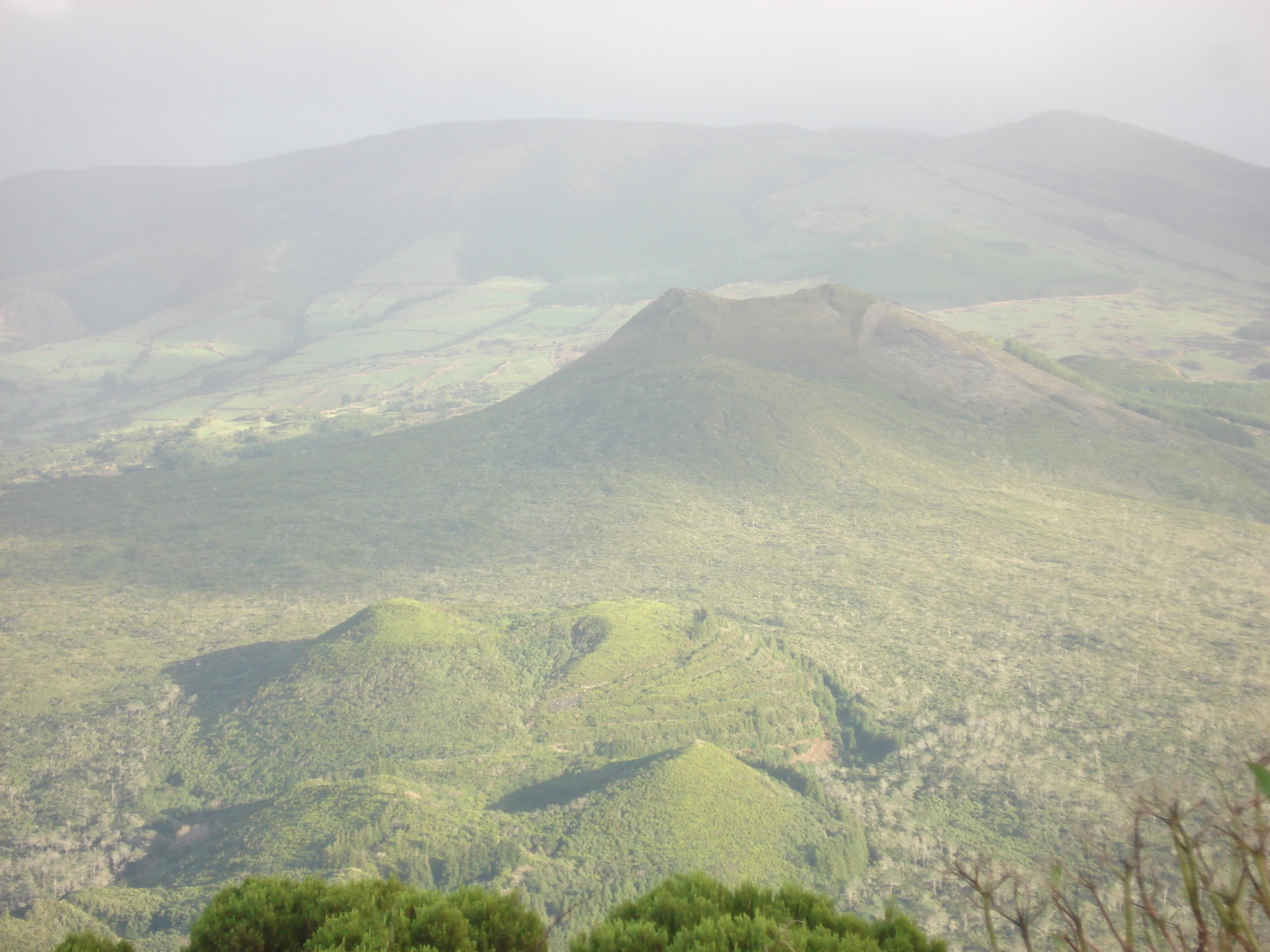
A series of cones toward the Caldeira on Faial

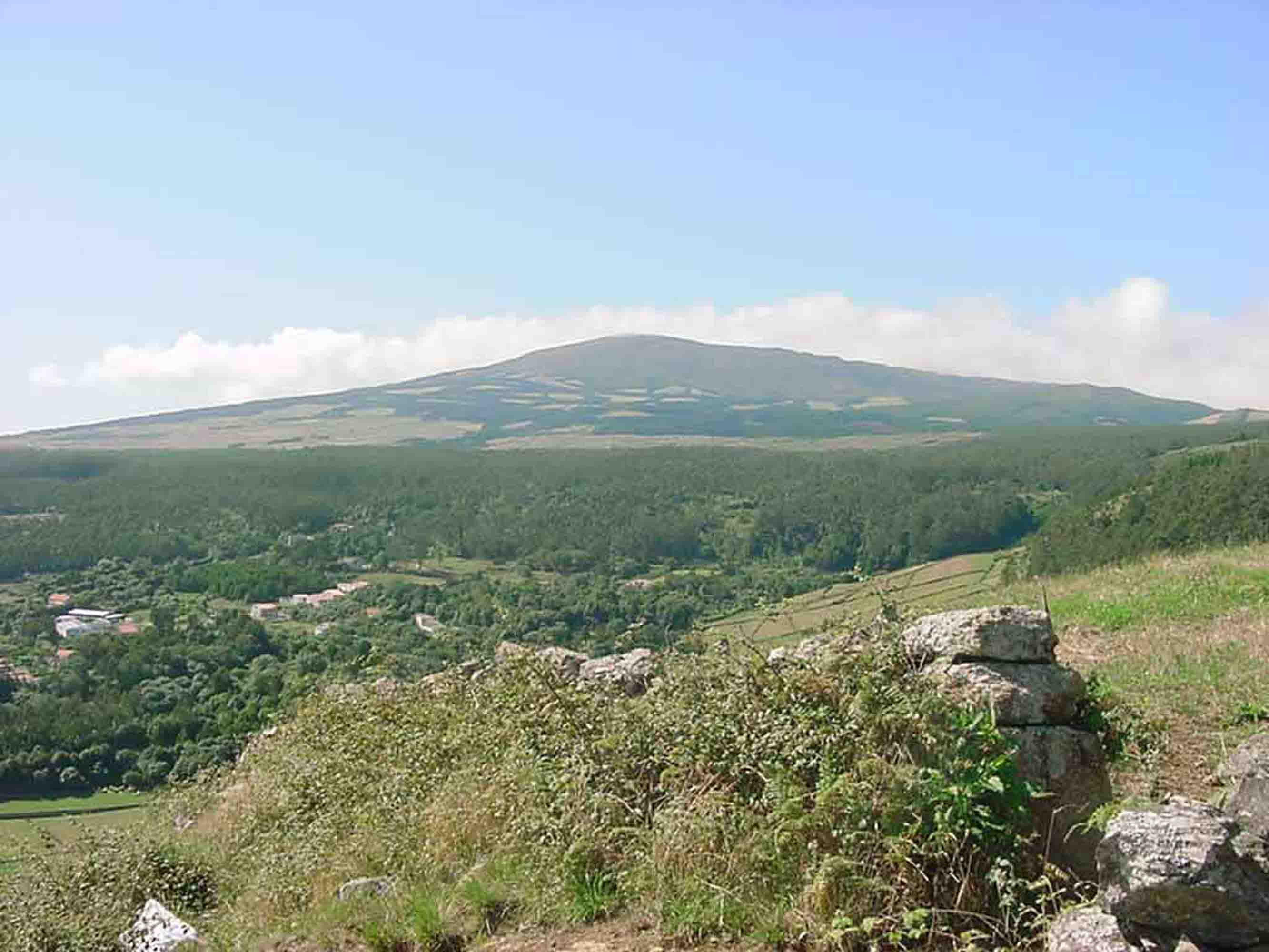
The shield volcano of Santa Bárbara on Terceira

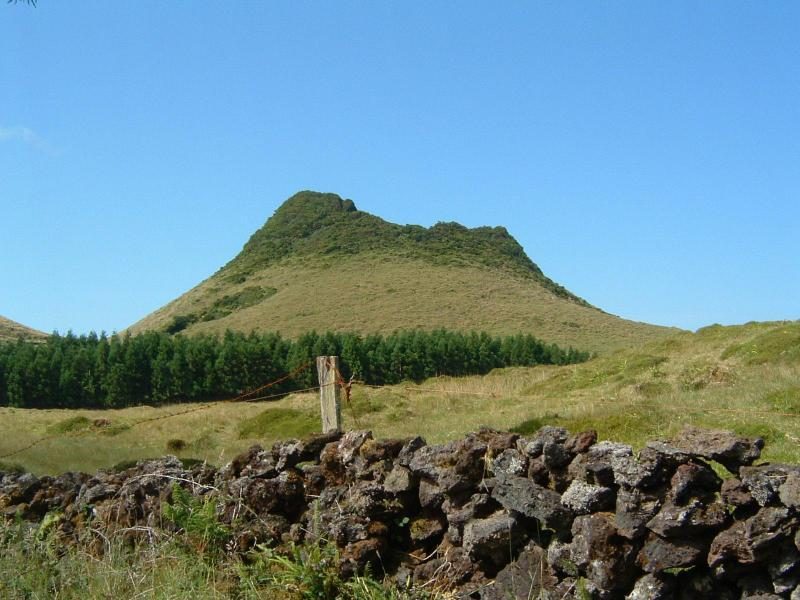
Pico do Gaspar, a spatter cone on Terceira

Name	Metres	Feet	Location	Island	Coordinate	Last eruption
Água de Pau (Fogo)	947	3,107	Serra de Água de Pau	São Miguel	37°45′44″N 25°28′25″W	1564
Cabeço do Caveiro	1061	3,481	Achada Plateau	Pico	38°26′27″N 28°12′52″W	—
Cabeço dos Grotões	987	3,238	Achada Plateau	Pico	38°26′27″N 28°12′52″W	—
Caldeirão	718	2,356	Morro dos Homens	Corvo	39°42′37″N 31°6′39″W	—
Dom João de Castro Bank	-43	−141	Atlantic Ocean	-	38°13′47″N 26°37′48″W	1720
Sete Cidades	856	2,808	Sete Cidades Massif	São Miguel	37°52′11″N 25°46′48″W	1880
Pico das Éguas	874	2,867	Sete Cidades Massif	São Miguel	37°49′46″N 25°45′18″W	—
Serra Gorda	485	1,591	Picos Fissural Region	São Miguel	37°47′20″N 25°40′59″W	-5000
Congro	560	1,840	Achada das Furnas	São Miguel	37°45′22″N 25°24′25″W	-3400
Furnas	804	2,638	Achada das Furnas	São Miguel	37°46′11″N 25°19′12″W	1630
Santa Bárbara	1021	3,350	Mistério Negros	Terceira	38°43′47″N 27°19′11″W	1761
Pico Alto	808	2,651	-	Terceira	38°45′20″N 27°12′36″W	-1000
Pico da Esperança	1053	3,455	Manadas Fissural Volcanic System	São Jorge	38°39′2″N 28°4′27″W	1907
Caldeira	402	1,319	-	Graciosa	39°1′29″N 27°58′19″W	-10000
Pico	2351	7,713	-	Pico	38°28′19″N 28°21′50″W	1718
Capelinhos	755	2,477	Costa de Nau	Faial	38°36′6″N 28°49′57″W	1958
Caldeira Volcano	1043	3,422	Cabeço Gordo	Faial	38°35′9″N 28°42′50″W	1958
S.V. Serreta	300	980	Atlantic Ocean	-	38°47′06″N 27°27′00″W	2001
S.V. Velas	-32	−105	Atlantic Ocean	-	38°42′30″N 28°17′08″W	1964
S.V. Cachorro	-130	−430	Atlantic Ocean	-	38°35′32″N 28°29′32″W	1963
Monaco Bank	-197	−646	Atlantic Ocean	-	37°36′02″N 25°51′59″W	1911
S.V. Sabrina	-26	−85	Atlantic Ocean	-	37°51′09″N 25°52′18″W	1811
Topo	1002	3,287	Lajes do Pico	Pico	38°25′21″N 28°13′34″W	-5000
Urzelina	900	3,000	Mato da Urzelina	São Jorge	38°40′03″N 28°07′19″W	1808
Pico Vermelho	937	3,074	Fissural Zone	Terceira	38°44′07″N 27°16′48″W	1761
Cabeços do Fogo	445	1,460	Fissural Zone	Pico	38°25′57″N 28°18′27″W	1720
S.V. Hirondella	-2665	−8,743	Atlantic Ocean	-	38°07′02″N 26°07′59″W	1682
Cabeço do Fogo	104	341	Capelo	Faial	38°35′11″N 28°46′8″W	1672
Picarito	430	1,410	Capelo	Faial	38°35′11″N 28°46′8″W	1673
Pico do Fogo	275	902	Fissural Zone	São Miguel	37°46′32″N 25°34′56″W	1652
S.V. Candelária	-115	−377	Ponta da Candelária	São Miguel	37°49′34″N 25°52′26″W	1638
Lagoa Seca	375	1,230	Furnas	São Miguel	37°44′34″N 25°19′33″W	1630
Mistério da Queimada	264	866	Fissual Zones Manadas	São Jorge	38°40′45″N 28°11′25″W	1580
Pico do Sapateiro (Pico Queimado)	348	1,142	Serra de Água de Paul	São Miguel	37°47′07″N 25°32′37″W	1563
Cabeços do Mistério	816	2,677	Fissural Zone	Pico	38°28′04″N 28°16′20″W	1564
Pico do Gaspar	361	1,184	Achada das Furnas	São Miguel	37°45′31″N 25°18′58″W	1443

== Madeira ==
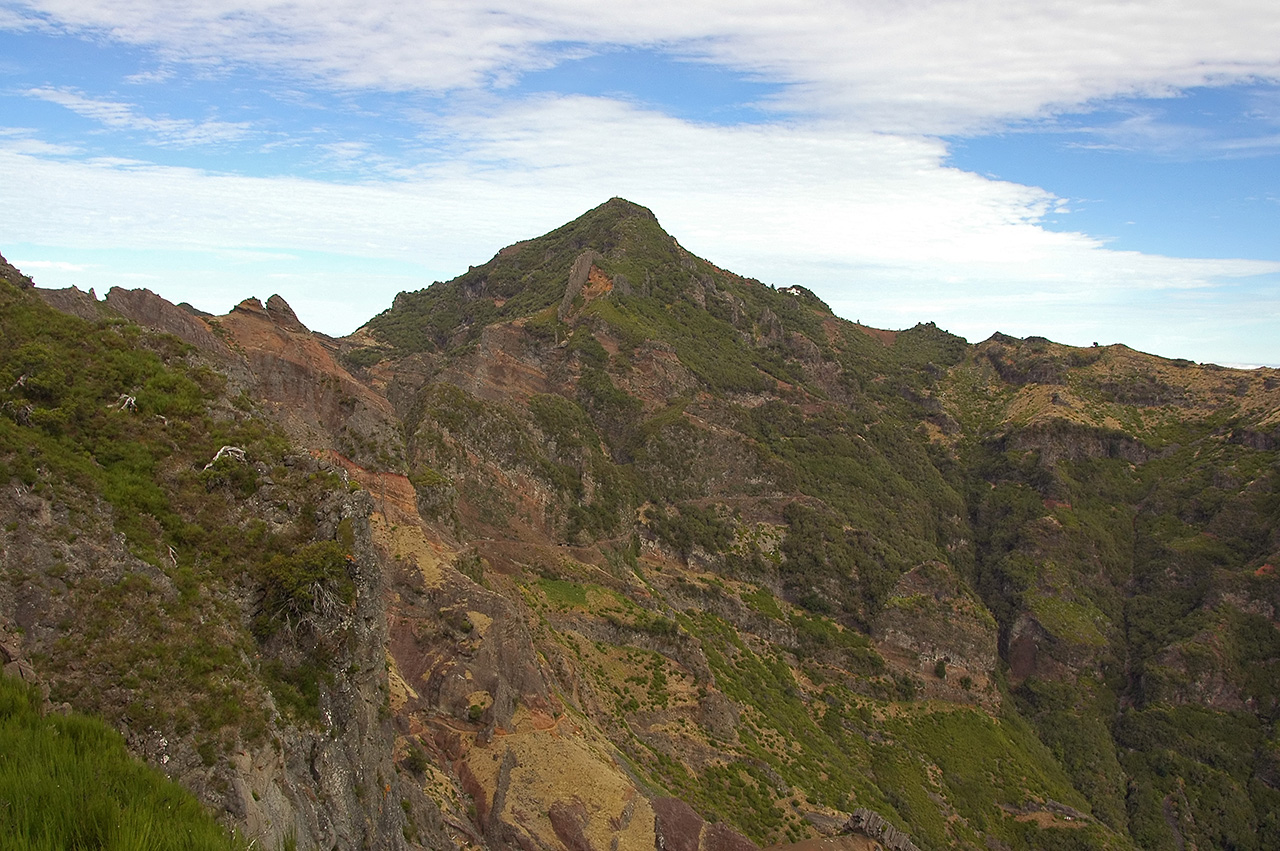
The tallest volcanic peak of Madeira, Pico Ruivo

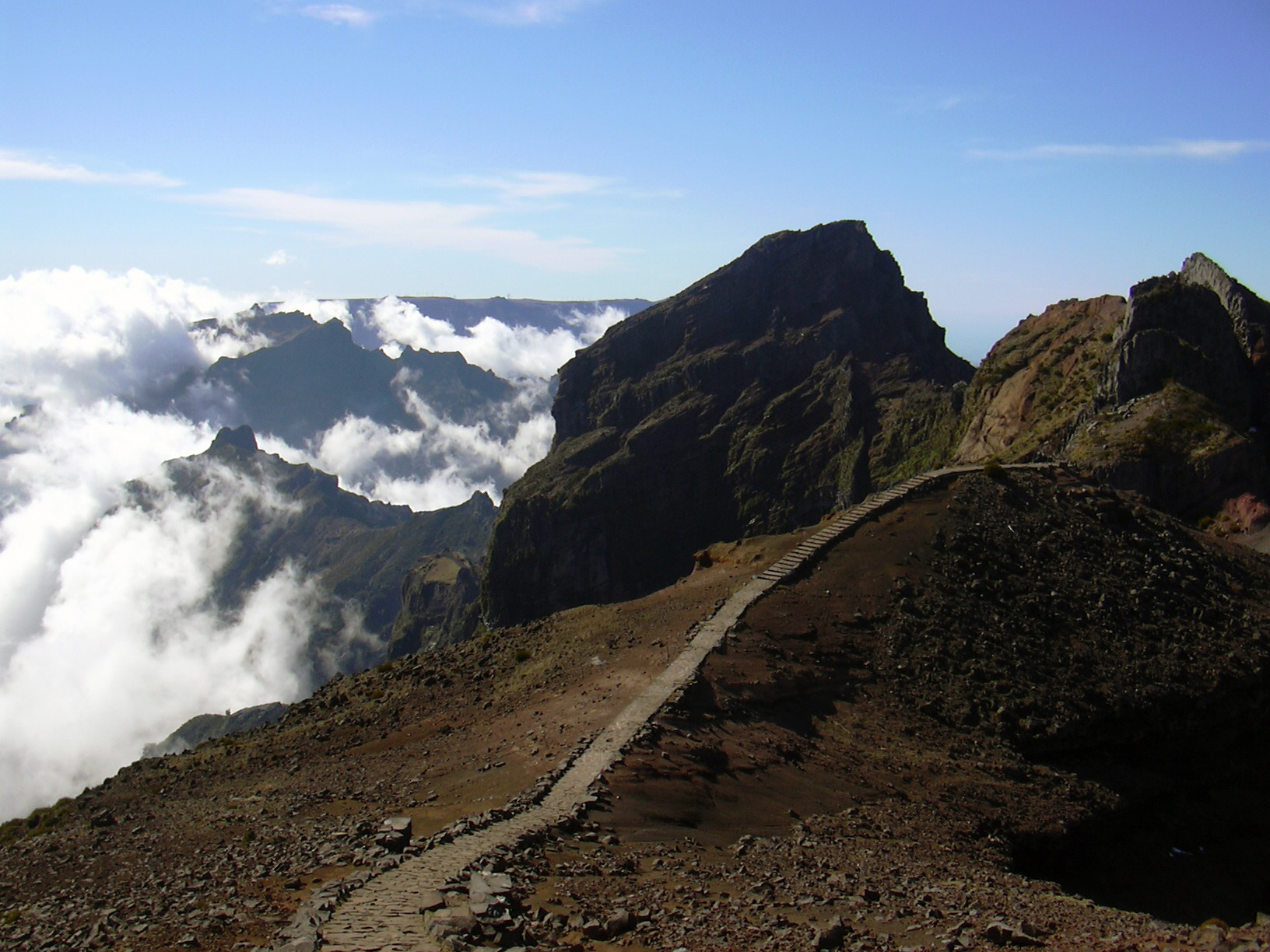
A cloud layer around Pico das Torres

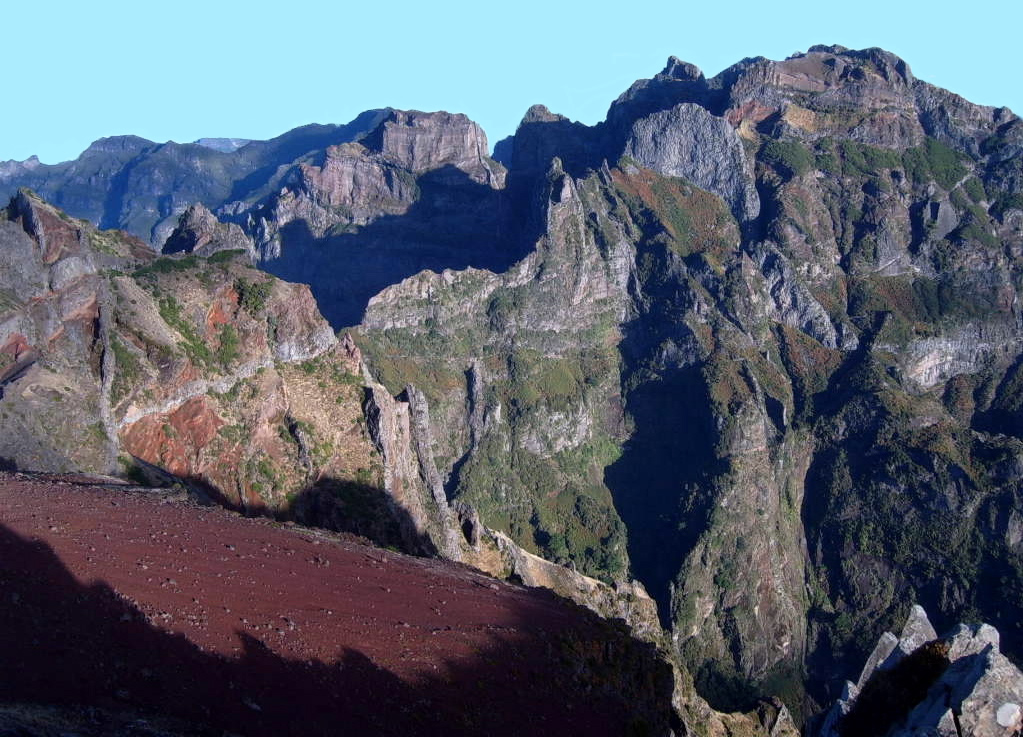
Looking towards the summit of Pico do Arieiro

Name	Metres	Feet	Location	Island	Coordinate	Last eruption
Pico do Arieiro	1818	5,965	Planalto da Madeira	Madeira	32°44′08″N 16°55′44″W	—
Pico Ruivo	1862	6,109	Planalto da Madeira	Madeira	32°45′31″N 16°56′32″W	—
Pico das Torres	1853	6,079	Planalto da Madeira	Madeira	32°44′59″N 16°56′19″W	—

== See also ==
- Geology of Madeira
