= Ilha (Santana) =

- Civil parish
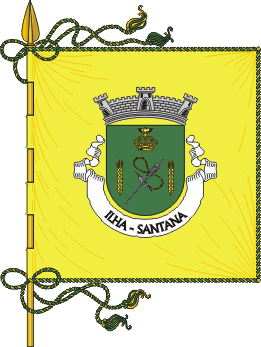
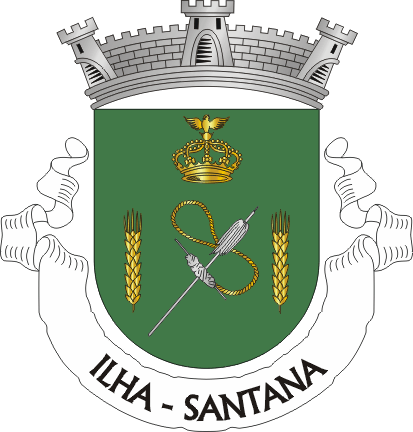
- Flag Coat of arms

- Location in Madeira
- Coordinates: 32°47′21″N 16°55′4″W
- Country: Portugal
- Auton. region: Madeira
- Island: Madeira
- Municipality: Santana

Area
  - Total: 14.19 km^{2} (5.48 sq mi)
- Elevation: 734 m (2,408 ft)

Population (2011)
  - Total: 255
  - Density: 18/km^{2} (47/sq mi)
- Time zone: UTC+00:00 (WET)
  - Summer (DST): UTC+01:00 (WEST)
- Postal code: 9230-234
- Area code: 291
- Patron: Nossa Senhora do Rosário

Ilha (Portuguese for "island") is a civil parish in the municipality of Santana in the Portuguese archipelago of Madeira. The population in 2011 was 255, in an area of 14.19 km².

== History ==
The history of this parish extends from the end of the 20th century, when it was created in 1989 by de-annexation from the civil parish of São Jorge. Its name was an extension of geomorphological characteristics, since it was an "island" between many of its other neighbours (ilha is the Portuguese word for island), one of the few landlocked parishes on the island of Madeira.

== Geography ==
Ilha is located along the northern coast, buttressed by the neighbouring civil parishes of Arco de São Jorge (in the west) and São Jorge (to the east). It contains the localities Achadinha, Corrida, Ermida, Garnal, Lombada do Meio and Lombo Grande.

The site of Achada do Marques is classified as a protected landscape (Portuguese: Paisagem Protegida) and part of the Parque Natural da Madeira. The classification was made to not only preserve the natural environment and landscape, but also to maintain the habits and traditions of the zone. Caldeirão Verde, another popular tourist destination in the parish, is part of the pedestrian trails that cross the island. In particular, from Caldeirão Verde, it is possible to follow a trail through the UNESCO protected Laurisilva forests to the locally-known Cascata do Caldeirão Verde (waterfall of Caldeirão Verde). In addition, Pico Ruivo, the highest point on the island at 1,862 metres (6,109 ft) falls within the parishes frontiers, and although a highly difficult climb (third highest nationally), its summit can be reached from within the trail network. Other pedestrian trails of note: Levada da Ilha-Vale da Lapa-Caldeirão Verde and Pico Ruivo-Encumeada.

== Economy ==
The parish's primary economic resource is the agricultural industry, featuring dairying and cattle-raising. In addition it supports a small economic collectivity that includes small shops, cafés and bars, in addition to a health-care centre. A locally-produced beverage/liquor, "Ponchilha", based on lemons, is produced in this region; it was originally commercialized by the Empresa de Inserção Social da Casa do Povo da Ilha (the local community/social centre).

== Culture ==
In the month of August, the Casa do Povo da Ilha organizes a Dia do Emigrante (Emigrant Day) for those former residents who left Ilha in search of better economic conditions. On the last weekend of September and first of October, the festivals in honour of the Santissimo Sacramento (Holy Sacrament) and patron saint (Our Lady of the Rosary) are also celebrated. Finally, at the end of November and beginning of December, the Semana Cultural da Ilha (Cultural Week of Ilha) result in various cultural activities based on a specific theme.
