= Faial =

Faial may refer to the following places:

- Faial Island, an island of the Azores, Portugal
- Faial da Terra, a civil parish in the municipality of Povoação, Azores, Portugal
- Faial (Santana), a civil parish in the municipality of Santana, Madeira, Portugal
