= São Jorge (Santana) =

- Civil parish
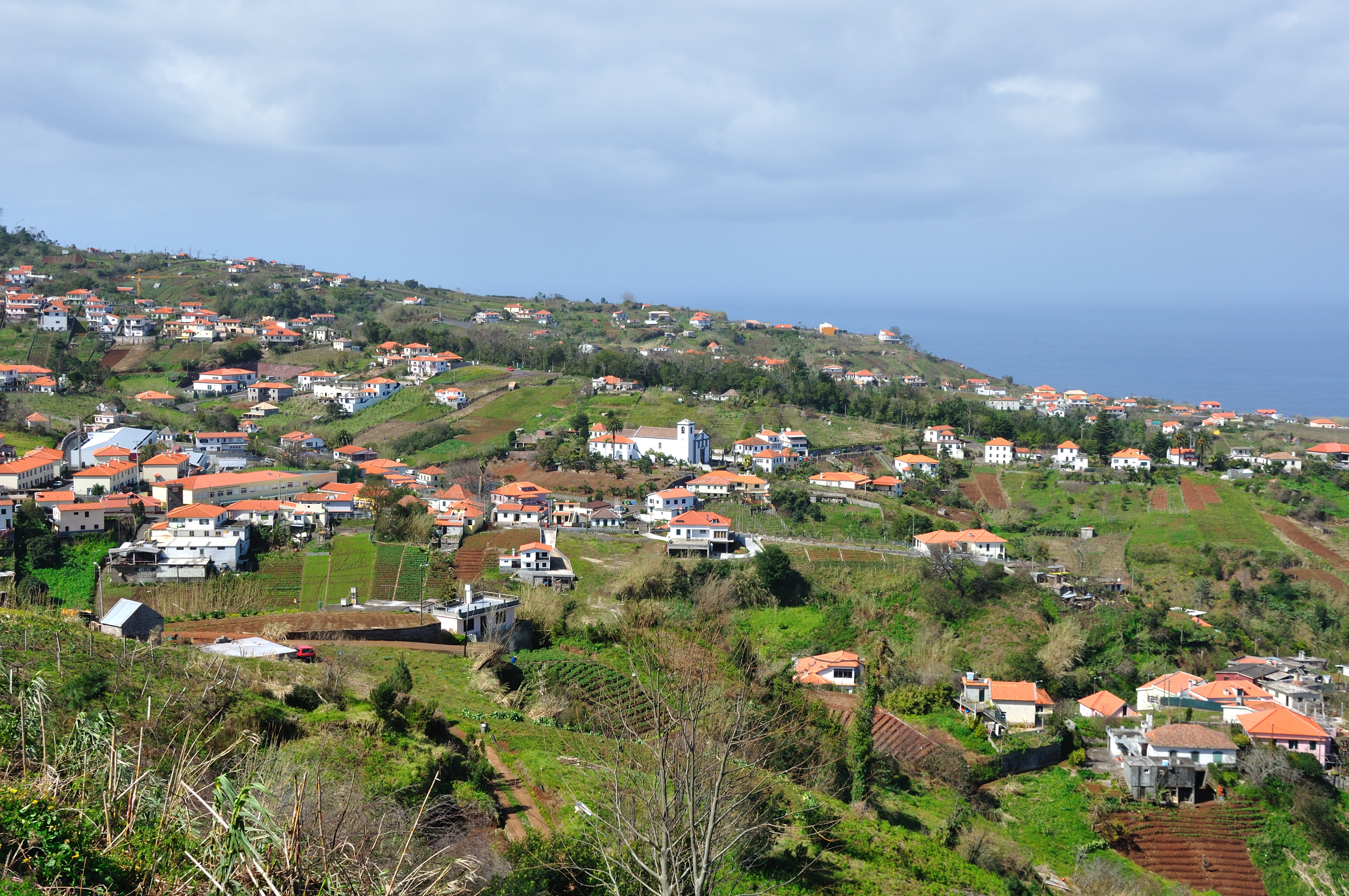

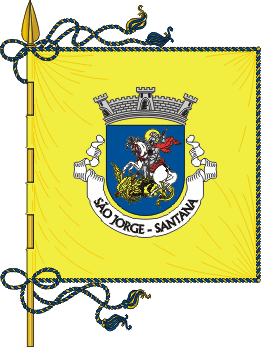
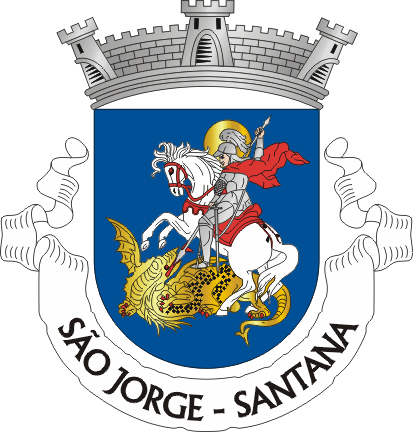
- Flag Coat of arms

- Location in Madeira
- Coordinates: 32°49′40″N 16°54′30″W
- Country: Portugal
- Auton. region: Madeira
- Island: Madeira
- Municipality: Santana
- Established: Settlement: fl. 1500; Parish: c. 1515

Area
  - Total: 19.34 km^{2} (7.47 sq mi)

Population (2011)
  - Total: 1,473
  - Density: 76.16/km^{2} (197.3/sq mi)
- Time zone: UTC+00:00 (WET)
  - Summer (DST): UTC+01:00 (WEST)
- Postal code: 9230-143
- Area code: 291
- Patron: Saint George

São Jorge (Portuguese: Saint George) is a civil parish in the municipality of Santana, in the island of Madeira. The population in 2011 was 1,473, in an area of 19.34 km^{2} (7.47 sq mi).

== History ==
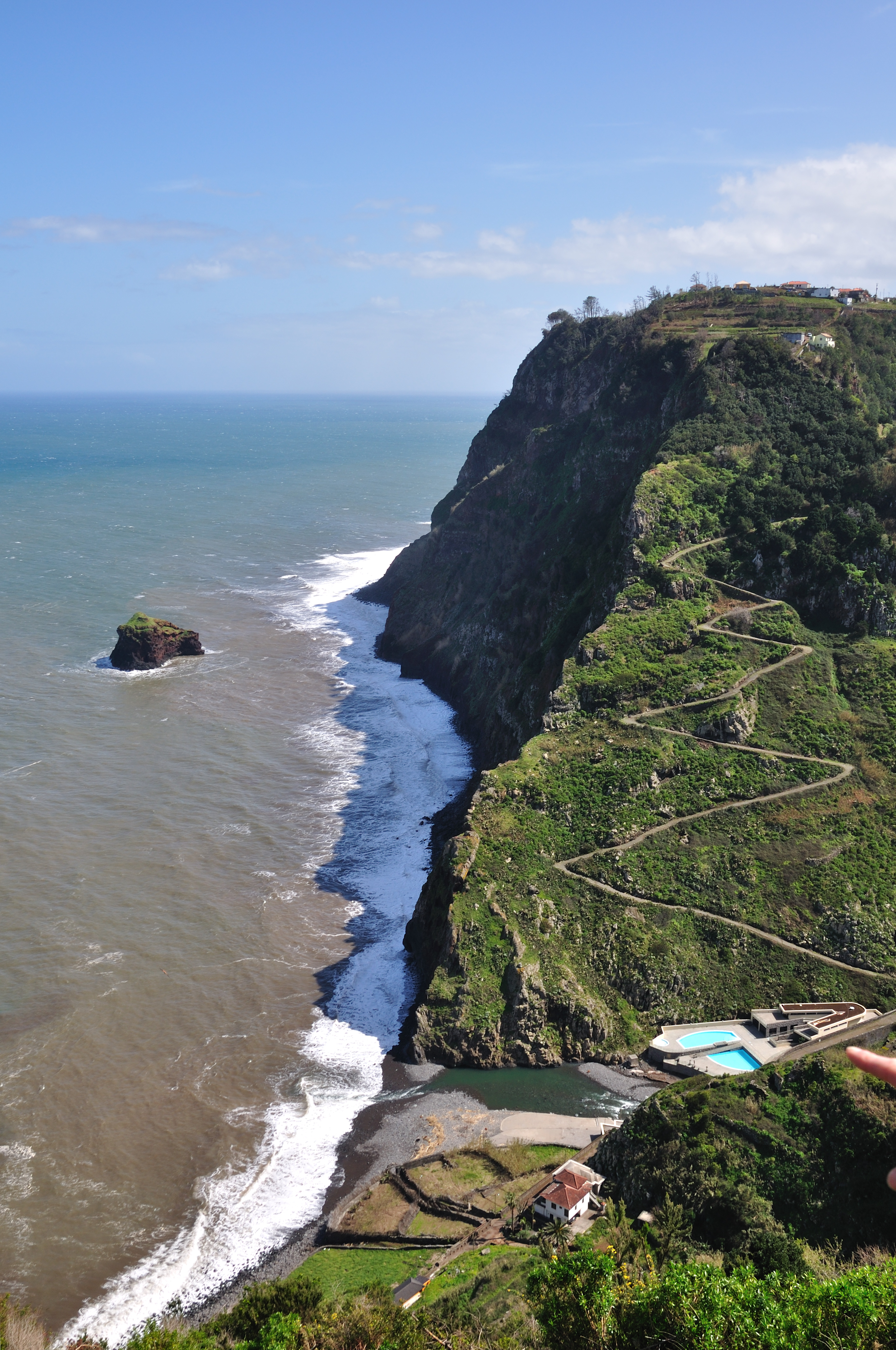
The cliffs of the coastal edge of the parish

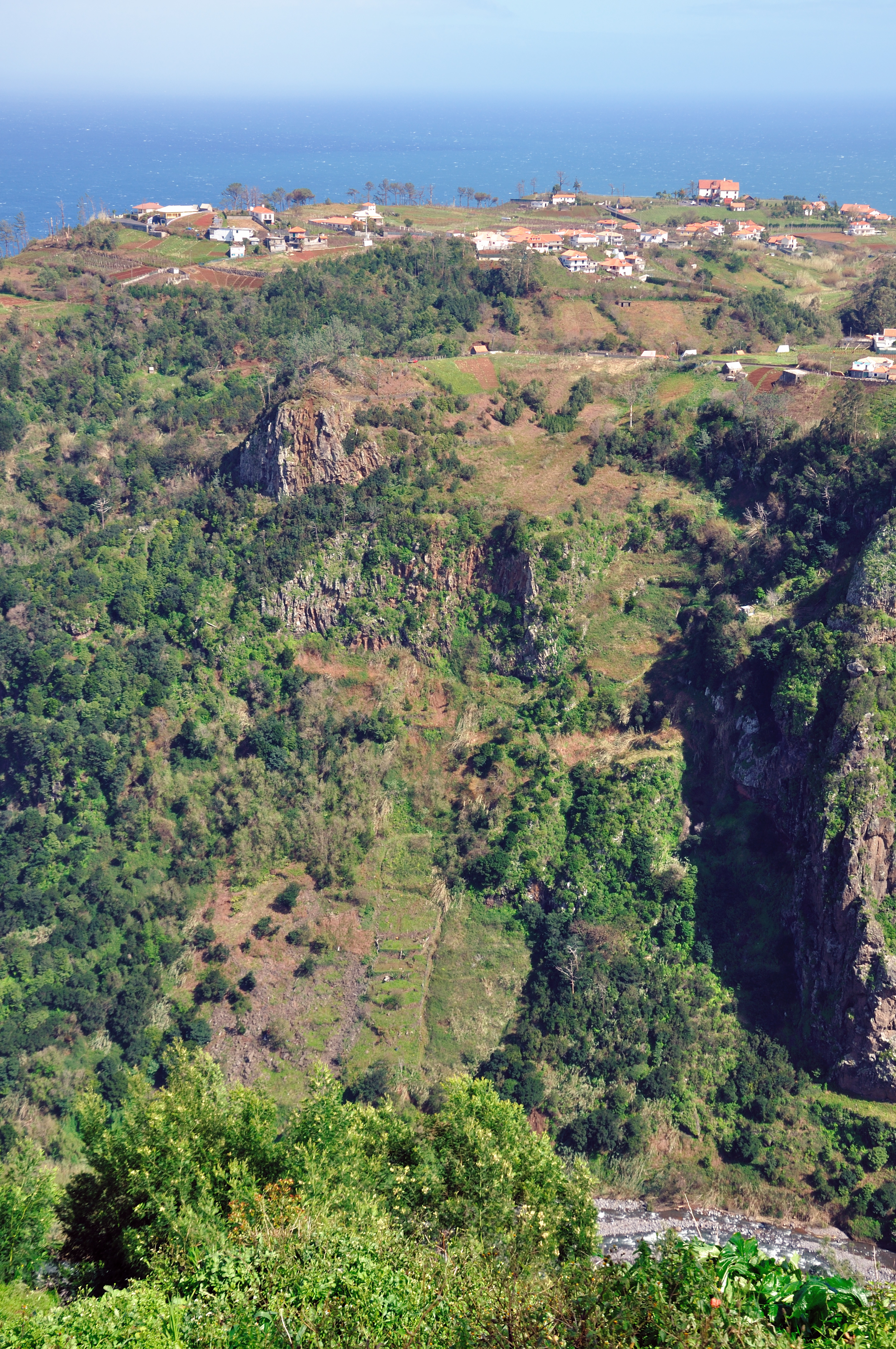
The valley that intersects some of the rural places of the parish

São Jorge was created in 1515, and benefitted from the patronage of King Manuel I of Portugal when it was merely a religious parish. These revelations were documented in the archives of the Torre do Tombo, and also included many of the pieces and religious artefacts donated by the King to the first Church of São Jorge. The first settlers to this parish occupied the areas in the Sítio do Calhau.

It was later divided, creating the parish of Santana in 1564 (and later municipal seat after 1835); the parish of Arco de São Jorge in 1676; and Ilha in 1989.

== Geography ==
The area is divided into "neighborhoods", forested and coastal spaces defined by several sítios (places): Achada de António Teixeira, Achada do Pico, Achada da Felpa, Achada Grande, Açougue, Barranco, Covas, Fajã Alta, Farrobo, Farrobo de Cima, Farrobo de Baixo, Furna de Pedro Jorge, Jogo da Bola, Lombo do Pico, Pé do Pico, Pico, Poço e Vale, Pomar, Ribeira Funda, São Pedro and Tanque.

Fifty kilometres from the regional capital, the parish is located 240 metres above sea level, limited in the north by the Atlantic Ocean and south by the mountains of the interior range (the highest altitudes in the parish include Pico Canário 1,592 metres (5,223 ft) and Pico dos Assumadouros 1,184 metres (3,885 ft). To the west is the civil parish of Arco de São Jorge and east are the parishes of Ilha and Santana. About half of the parish is covered by the rich Laurissilva forest defined as Natural Heritage by UNESCO.

== Architecture ==
- Chapel of São Pedro (Portuguese: Capela de São Pedro), dating to the end of the 15th century
- Chapel of the Sagrada Coração de Jesus (Portuguese: Capela do Sagrado Coração de Jesus), dedicated to the Sacred Heart of Jesus, is located in the place of Ribeira Funda, and completed in 2000
- Church of São Jorge (Portuguese: Igreja de São Jorge), completed in 1761, the Baroque-style church includes a rich presbytery of gilded wood, and ornate pulpit.

== Notable people ==
- Teodósio Clemente de Gouveia (c.1889 - Lourenço Marques; c.1962), was a Roman Catholic Cardinal, who served as Archbishop of Lourenço Marques in Mozambique from 1940 until his death (he was elevated to the cardinalate in 1946 by Pope Pius XII).
