= Dom João de Castro Bank =

Submarine volcano in the Azores

- Location within Atlantic Ocean
- Summit depth: 13 m (43 ft)

Location
- Location: Atlantic Ocean
- Coordinates: 38.14°N 26.38°W
- Country: Portugal

Geology
- Type: Submarine volcano
- Last eruption: December 1720

Dom João de Castro Bank (Portuguese: Banco de D. João de Castro) is a large submarine volcano located in the central north Atlantic Ocean, between the islands of São Miguel and Terceira in the archipelago of the Azores.

== History ==
The first historical reference correlated with the submarine volcanoes between São Miguel and Terceira occurred after two ships of the French corsair Henry Tourin sank in the spring of 1718.

The last major eruption associated with this region occurred on 31 December 1720. Beginning as a submarine eruption, it eventually built into a Surtseyan eruption that resulted in the formation of a circular island 1.5 kilometres (0.93 mi) long and 250 m (800 ft) in altitude. Smoke and steam released by the eruption was visible from the islands of São Miguel and Terceira. The eruption also caused multiple small earthquakes felt on those islands.

Designated the Ilha Nova (New Island), it remained above sea-level for only two years, reaching a height of 180 metres (590 ft) and diameter of 900 metres (3,000 ft). Marine erosion and ocean swells reduced and degraded the cone's size considerably, so that by 21 July 1722 the Conselho da Marinha Português (Portuguese Marine Council) was advised the island had disappeared (Oliveira, 1943).

After two centuries of disputed references to the existence of the island, on 28 July 1941 the hydrographic ship NH D. João de Castro identified its position and cataloged the morphology of the bank. In keeping with nautical tradition, the bank inherited the discovering ship's name.

Intense seismic activity in the area in 1997 suggests a small eruption may have occurred in that year.

The most recent seismic events from the region occurred from 4 June 2012, when incrementally increasing tremors affected the region. A maximum seismic event was recorded from the islands of São Miguel and Terceira, equivalent to levels III/IV on the Mercalli Scale.

== Geography ==
The volcano remains seismically active between the islands of São Miguel and Terceira, rising under 13 m (43 ft) of the sea surface. The volcano has a large fumarole field approximately 1,600 square metres (17,000 sq ft) in area. Volcanic gases released from the fumaroles are visible on the water's surface.

Two parasitic craters, both about 90 by 45 metres (295 ft × 148 ft) wide, are located on the northwest flank. The younger crater displays a floor consisting of a chilled lava lake with polygonal surface fractures, while the older, less distinct crater is obscured by tephra deposits.

=== Biome ===
Dom João de Castro Bank Protected Marine Area
- IUCN category Ib (wilderness area)
- Interactive map of Dom João de Castro Bank Protected Marine Area
- Area: 16.31 km^{2} (6.30 sq mi)
- Created: 2011
- Governing body: ICNF

D. João de Castro Bank showcases significant biodiversity, with approximately 220 identified species. Fish species observed near the bank include Bermuda chub (Kyphosus sectatrix), triggerfish (family Balistidae), needlefish (family Belonidae), wahoo (Acanthocybium solandri), and giant oceanic manta ray (Mobula birostris). The dominant species of aquatic flora are Sargassum seaweeds.

The bank is an important fishing ground for demersal fish, such as the black seabream (Spondyliosoma cantharus) and blackbelly rosefish (Helicolenus dactylopterus), as well as pelagic tuna species (Thunnus and others).

On 27 July 1996, in a scientific expedition organized by the Clube Naval de Ponta Delgada, marine biology researchers from the University of the Azores completed a study identifying species localized within the bank.

== See also ==
- List of volcanoes in Azores
