= Pico Ruivo =

Highest peak on Madeira

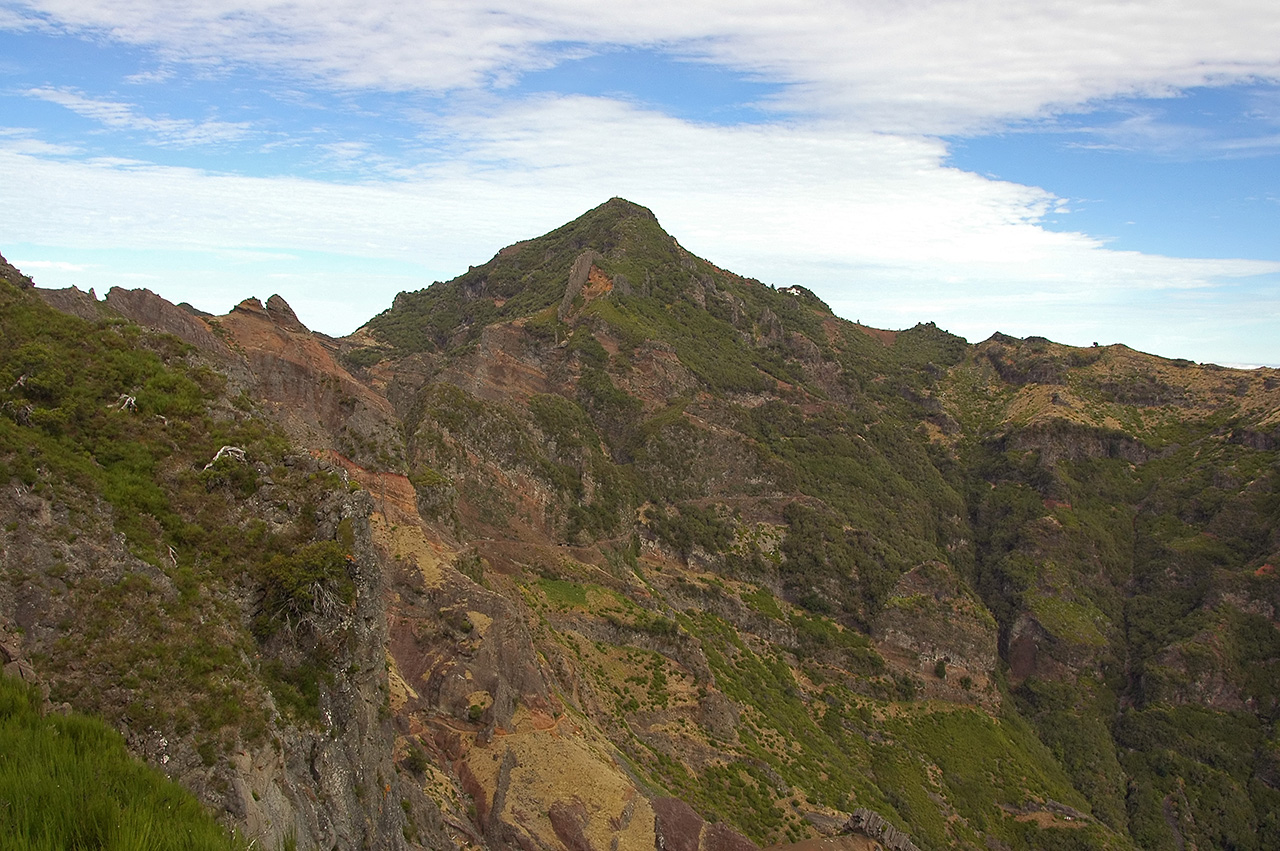

Highest point
- Elevation: 1,861 m (6,106 ft)
- Prominence: 1,861 m (6,106 ft)
- Listing: Ultra; Ribu
- Coordinates: 32°45′31″N 16°56′32″W

Geography
- Location within Madeira
- Location: Madeira

Climbing
- Easiest route: From Achada do Teixeira

Pico Ruivo (European Portuguese pronunciation: [ˈpiku ˈʁujvu]) is the highest peak on Madeira Island and the third highest in Portugal, standing at 1,861 metres (6,106 ft) in the Santana municipality. Accessible only by foot, it can be reached from either Pico do Areeiro or via a shorter, easier trail from Achada do Teixeira. The summit provides panoramic views of the island, from the green mountains surrounding Curral das Freiras to the Ribeira Grande and São Jorge valleys. On days with clear visibility, Pico Ruivo also offers sweeping views of Porto Santo Island and the Desertas Islands.

North of the peak, a shelter, renovated in 2019, offers essential amenities such as running water, restrooms, and meal services for hikers.

As the highest point in the archipelago, Pico Ruivo is primarily surrounded by high-altitude heath. The area is also marked by monumental rock formations, which often rise above the clouds, dominating the landscape. The region is home to several bird species, including the Madeira firecrest, the chaffinch, and the linnet.

== Hiking Routes ==
Pico Ruivo is accessible through a network of marked trails, all of which traverse Natura 2000 areas and unique ecosystems like the Central Mountain Massif and Laurel forest. Of these routes, PR1 and PR1.2 are the only ones reaching the mountain's peak, with an entry fee of €3 for visitors over the age of 12. The other two paths, PR1.1 and PR1.3, begin at Pico Ruivo's shelter and lead to other parts of the island.

=== PR1: Vereda do Areeiro ===
This 7 kilometres (4 mi) trail connects three of Madeira's highest peaks: Pico do Areeiro, Pico das Torres, and Pico Ruivo. Classified as moderately challenging, the hike takes approximately 3.5 hours to complete. Beginning at Pico do Areeiro's viewpoint at 1,818 metres (5,965 ft), it features volcanic tunnels, steep staircases, and dramatic slopes. The highest point of the route is 1,857 metres (6,093 ft), with the lowest at 1,491 metres (4,892 ft). The final segment includes a steep climb to Pico Ruivo's shelter, with the option to continue toward Achada do Teixeira via the "Standing Man" (Homem em pé) rock formation (PR1.2).

=== PR1.1: Vereda da Ilha ===
This 8.2 kilometres (5 mi) trail descends from Pico Ruivo's shelter at 1,764 metres (5,787 ft) to the village of Ilha at 490 metres (1,608 ft). With a total elevation drop of 1,376 metres (4,514 ft), it is moderately difficult and typically completed in about three hours. The route traverses two distinct ecosystems: the herbaceous and shrubby vegetation of the Central Mountain Massif and the lush Laurel forest, renowned for its water retention and biodiversity. Endemic birds, such as the chaffinch and the Madeira firecrest, are commonly seen along the trail.

=== PR1.2 Vereda do Pico Ruivo ===
The shortest and most direct route to Pico Ruivo starts at Achada do Teixeira. At 2.8 kilometres (2 mi) each way, the trail takes about 1.5 hours for a round trip and is moderately challenging. This route offers panoramic views of the Central Mountain Massif and passes by shelters built to protect hikers from Madeira's unpredictable weather. Altitude variation on this trail is minimal, ranging only by 5 metres (16 ft).

=== PR1.3 Vereda da Encumeada ===
Currently closed (as of November 2024, likely due to fire damage) this trail stretches westward from Pico Ruivo's shelter to Encumeada, covering 11.2 kilometres (7 mi). With an estimated hiking time of six hours, the moderately difficult route passes through dug out caves like Furna da Lapa da Cadela. Historically, these caves provided shelter for those harvesting heather, which was used for stakes, firewood, or charcoal production. The trail concludes with panoramic views near Encumeada, in a more central position of the island.

== Gallery ==
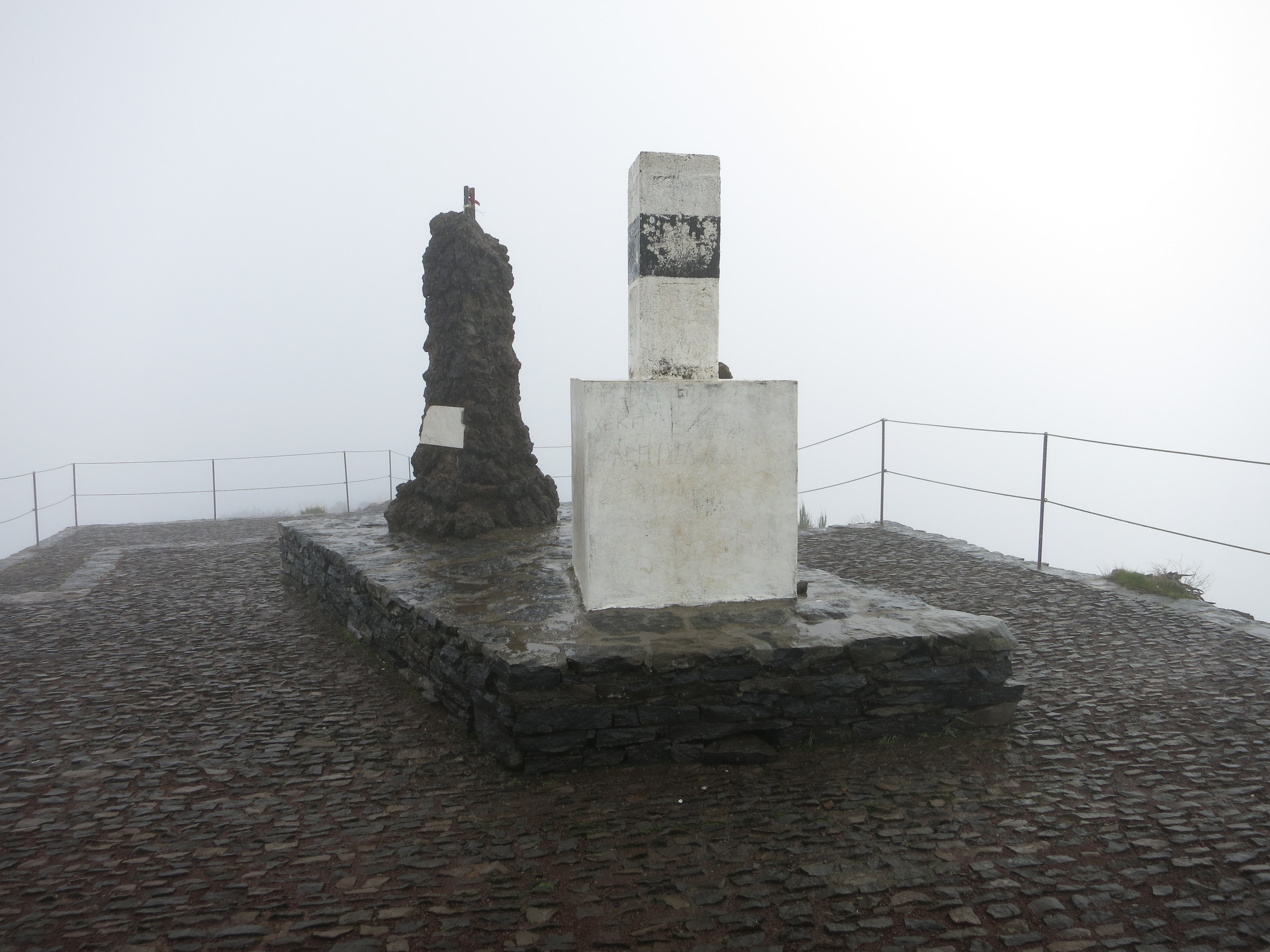
Platform on the summit of Pico Ruivo.

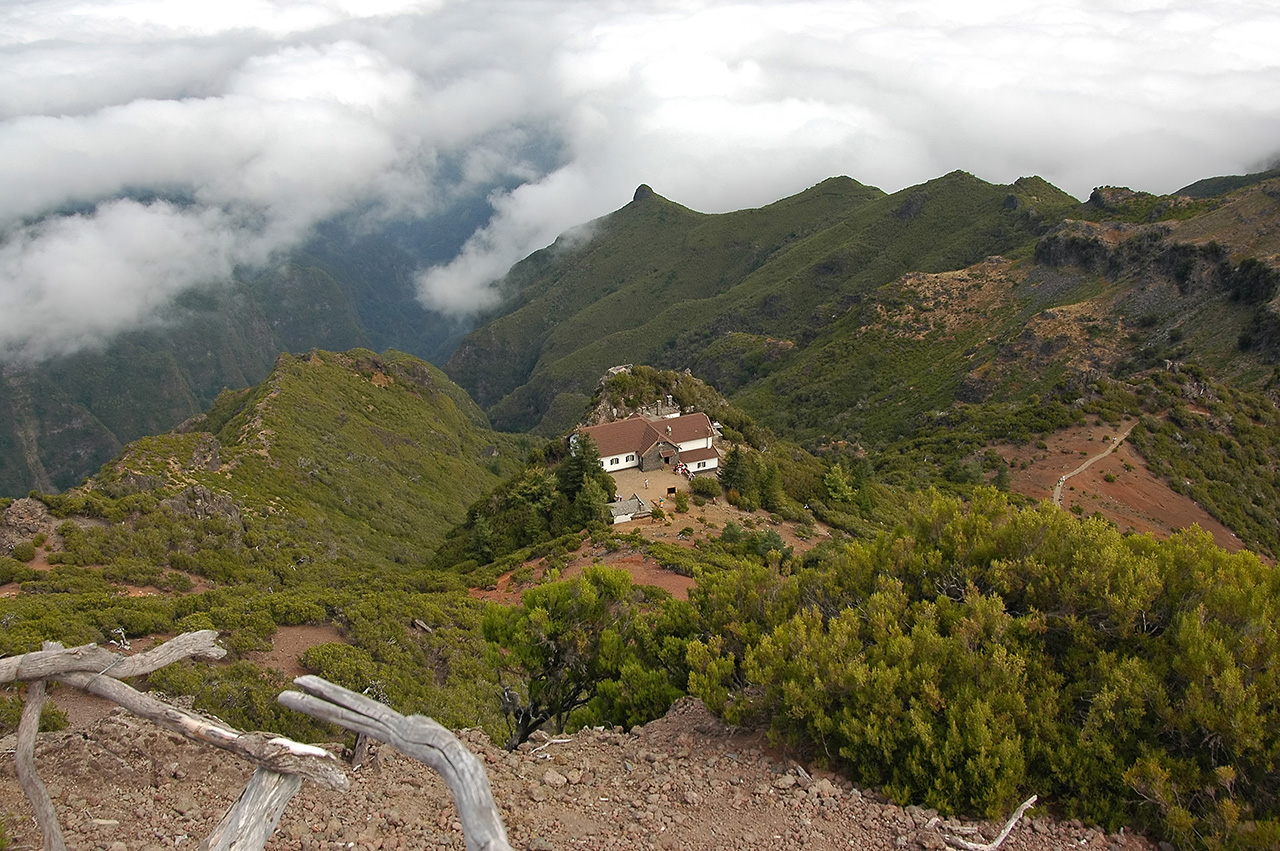
Shelter below the summit.

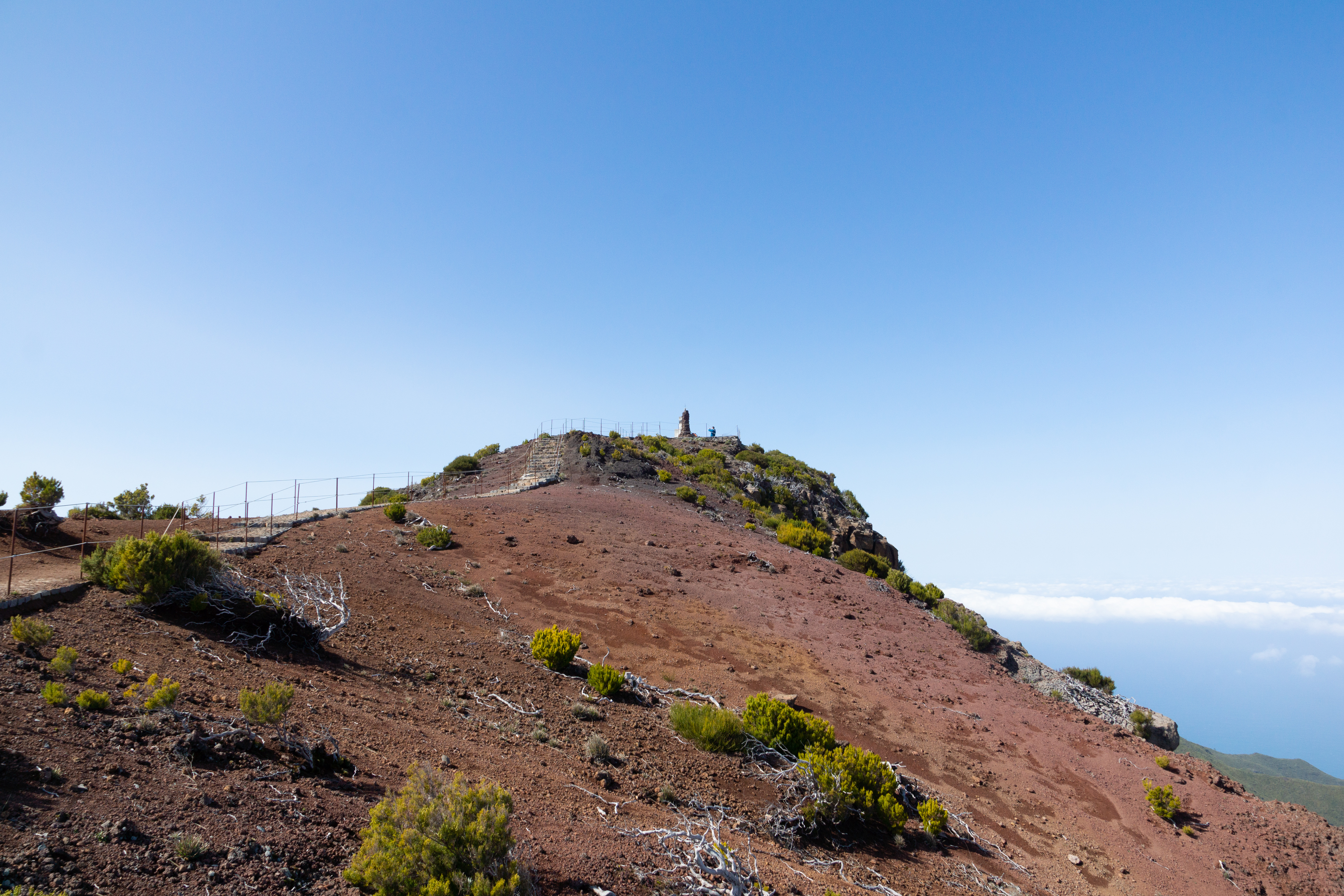
Summit from the viewing platform in the northwest.

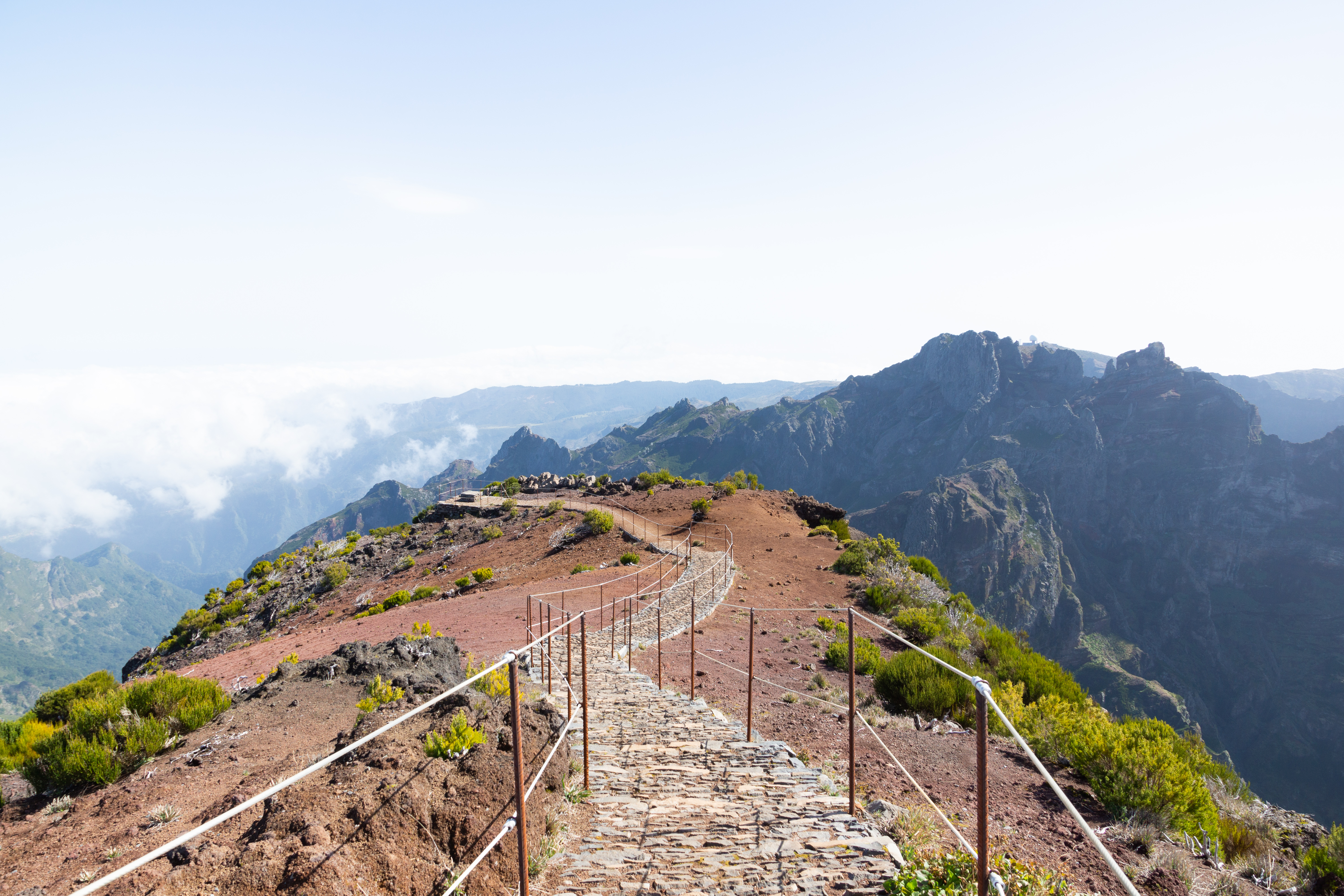
Second viewing platform, northwest from the summit.

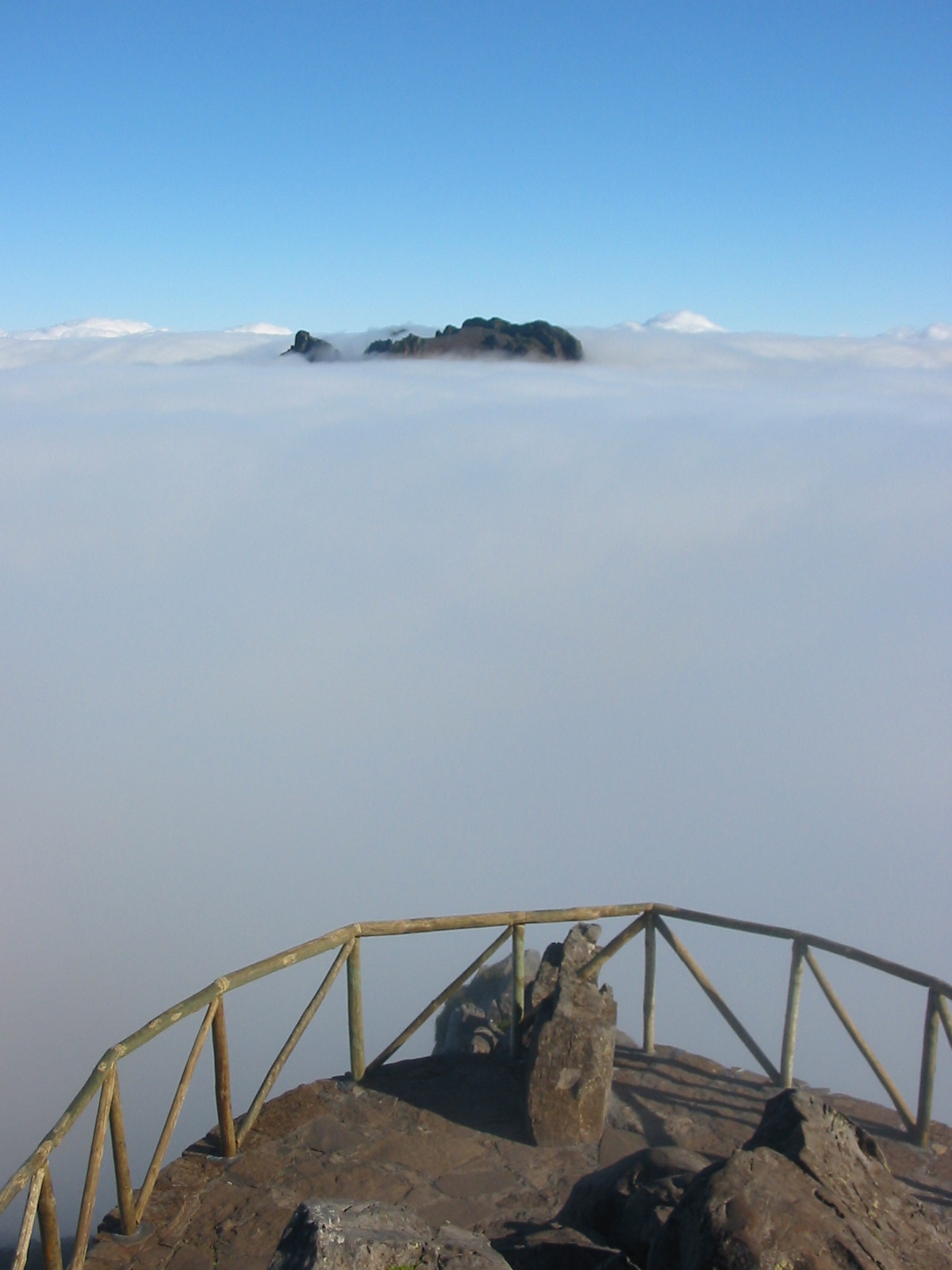
View towards Pico das Torres and Pico Ruivo from Pico do Arieiro.

== See also ==
- List of islands by highest point
- List of European ultra prominent peaks
