= Monaco Bank (volcano) =

Submarine volcano in the Azores

- Summit depth: 197 m (646 ft)

Location
- Location: Atlantic Ocean
- Coordinates: 36.60°N 25.88°W
- Country: Portugal

Geology
- Type: Submarine volcano
- Last eruption: March 1911

Monaco Bank is a submarine volcano in the Azores, which last erupted in 1911.

== See also ==
- List of volcanoes in Azores
