= Pico das Torres =

Mountain in Madeira, Portugal

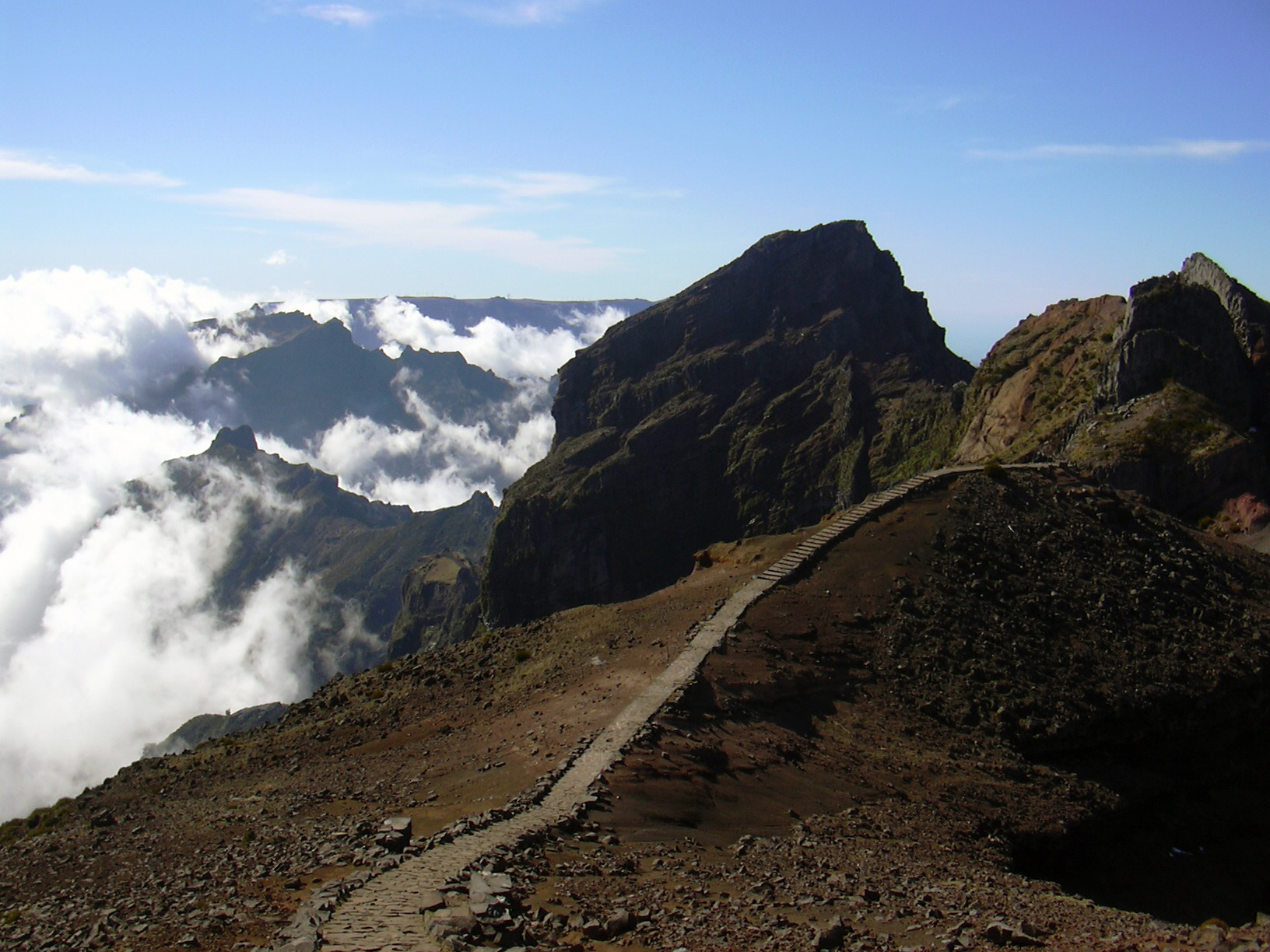
- Pico das Torres seen from Pico do Arieiro

Highest point
- Elevation: 1,853 m (6,079 ft)
- Coordinates: 32°45′02″N 16°56′18″W

Geography
- Location within Madeira
- Location: Madeira, Portugal

Pico das Torres is the second highest peak on the Atlantic island of Madeira, Portugal. It lies roughly midway between the Pico Ruivo and Pico do Arieiro at an elevation of 1,853 metres (6,079 ft) and is only accessible from the trail between these two peaks.
