= Igreja de São Jorge, São Jorge =

Igreja de São Jorge
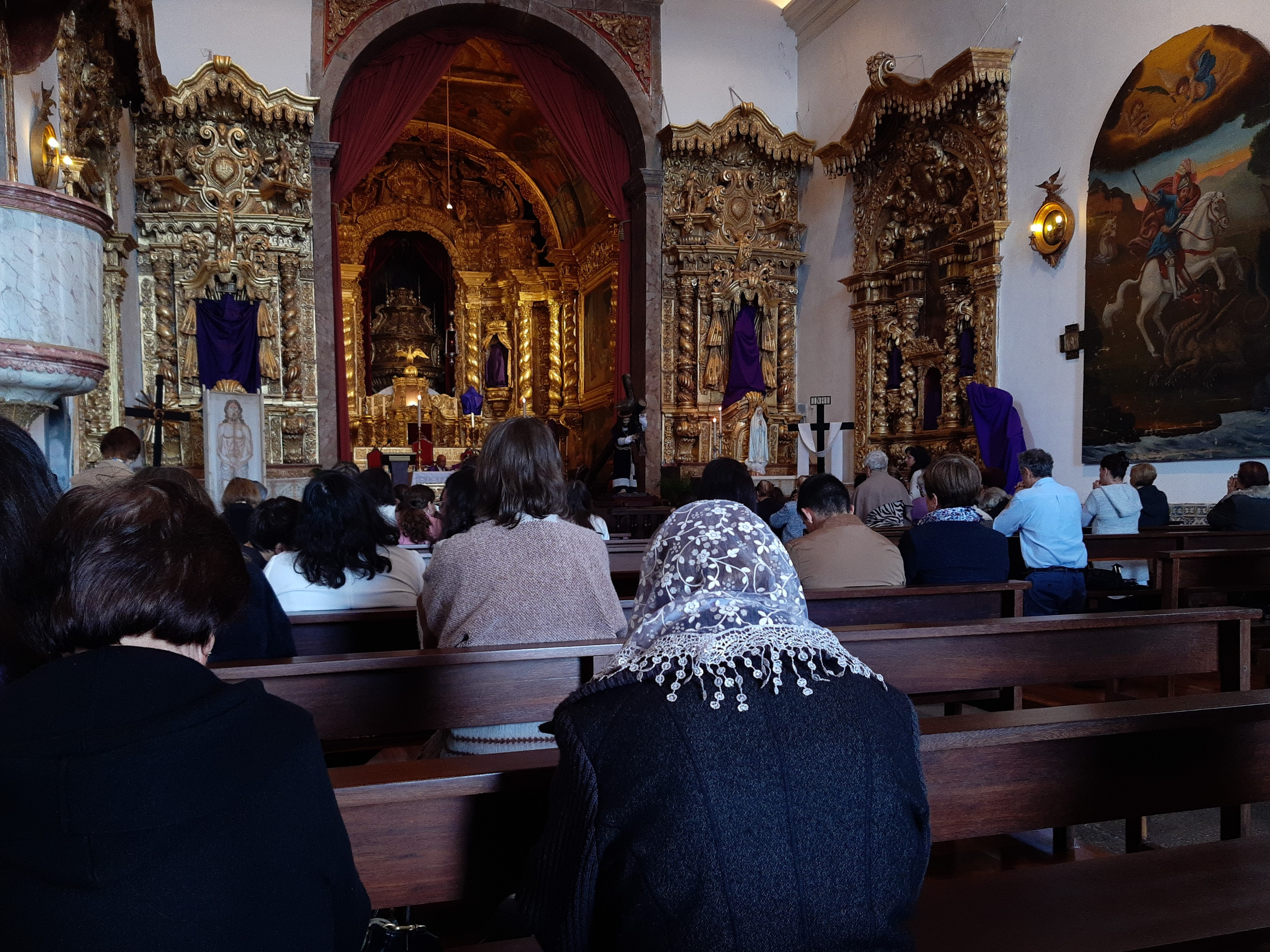
- Interior during a service in Lent

- 32°49′38″N 16°54′25″W
- Location: São Jorge, Madeira
- Country: Portugal
- Denomination: Catholic

History
- Status: parish church

Administration
- Archdiocese: Patriarchate of Lisbon
- Diocese: Diocese of Funchal

The Igreja Matriz de São Jorge (Mother church of Saint George) is a church and parish located in São Jorge on the island of Madeira in Portugal.

The church was built in Baroque style in the 17th century. While austere from the outside, it is richly decorated inside. It was dedicated to Saint George. The church is the largest Baroque church on the island.

The church has a single nave. It features several altars, especially a high altar, with rich decoration in gilded wood.
