= Santana, Madeira =

Santana
- Municipality
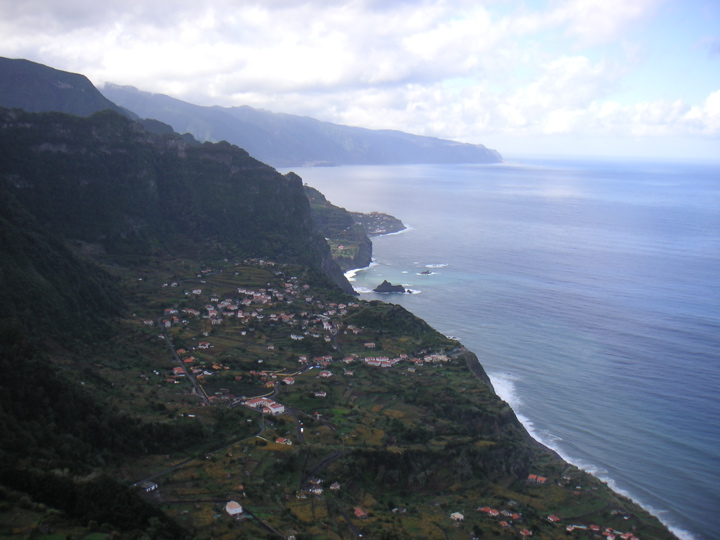
- The village of Arco de São Jorge in an amphitheatre-shaped valley along the northern coast of Santana municipality

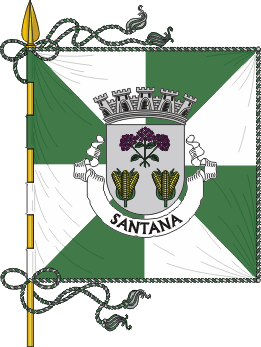
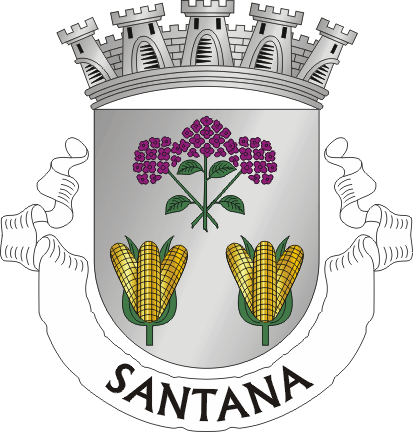
- Flag Coat of arms
- Interactive map of Santana
- Coordinates: 32°48′13.45″N 16°52′47.30″W
- Country: Portugal
- Auton. region: Madeira
- Island: Madeira
- Established: Settlement: 25 May 1835; City: 6 July 2000
- Parishes: 6

Government
  - President: António Joaquim Caíres Batista Rosa

Area
  - Total: 95.56 km^{2} (36.90 sq mi)
- Elevation: 509 m (1,670 ft)

Population (2021)
  - Total: 6,558
  - Density: 68.63/km^{2} (177.7/sq mi)
- Time zone: UTC+00:00 (WET)
  - Summer (DST): UTC+01:00 (WEST)
- Postal code: 9230-116
- Area code: 291
- Patron: Saint Anne
- Local holiday: 24 June
- Website: http://cm-santana.com

Santana (Portuguese pronunciation: [sɐ̃ˈtɐnɐ]), short form for Santa Ana (meaning Saint Anne) is a municipality along the northern coast of the island of Madeira, in the Portuguese archipelago of the same name. The population in 2011 was 7,719, in an area of 95.56 square kilometres (36.90 mi^{2}).

== Geography ==
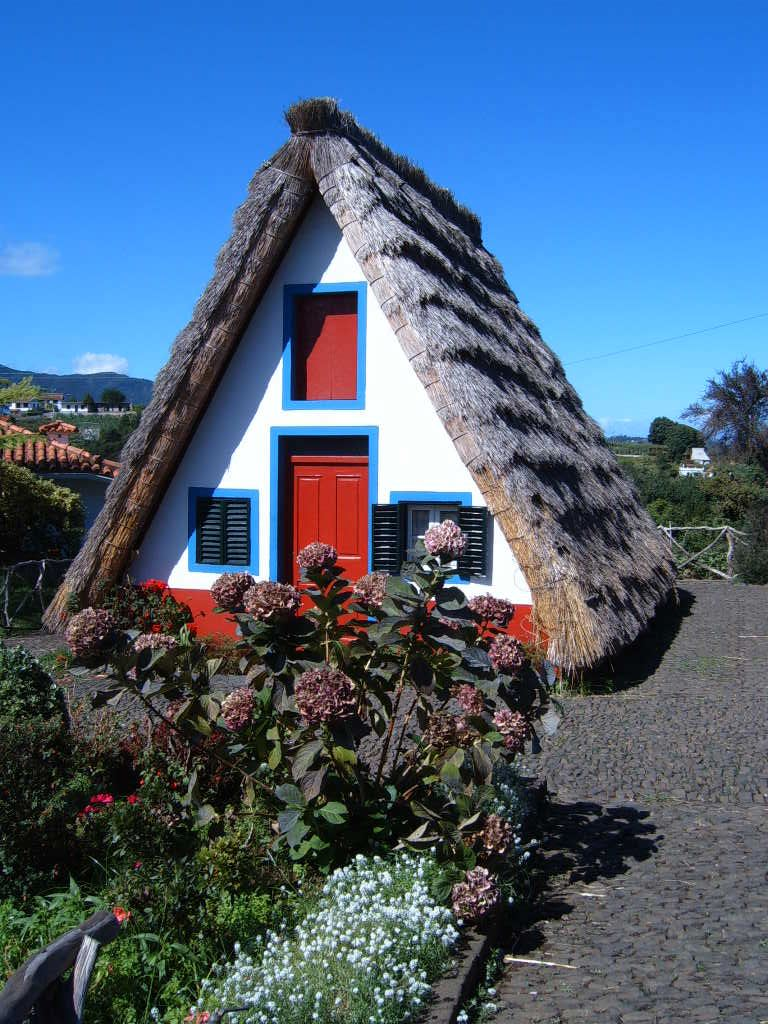
An example of the traditional Madeirense home found in the municipality of Santana

Santana includes six parishes, within a rugged mountainous environment, most occupying river-valleys:

- Arco de São Jorge
- Faial
- Ilha
- Santana - the parish (and town) has a population of 3,275 (in 2011), in an area of 19.01 km^{2}
- São Jorge
- São Roque do Faial

== Climate ==
Queimadas Forest Park (altitude: 860m) experiences a temperate oceanic climate (Köppen: Cfb), characterised by high rainfall distributed throughout the year and persistently mild temperatures moderated by the surrounding laurisilva forest and frequent cloud immersion. Annual precipitation reaches approximately 2,314 mm, among the highest recorded on Madeira's northern slopes, with November being the wettest month at 391 mm. Unlike lower-elevation stations in the São Vicente valley — which exhibit a modest Mediterranean-influenced dry season in summer — Queimadas receives sufficient rainfall even in its driest month, July, at 47.1 mm, enough to sustain continuous vegetation growth without seasonal moisture stress. This contrasts notably with higher-altitude stations such as Pico do Arieiro (1,818 m), where July precipitation falls to approximately 13.2 mm, and with coastal stations where dry summers are more pronounced. At 860 m, Queimadas sits within the cloud condensation belt of Madeira's central massif, where persistent fog and orographic mist supplement recorded rainfall, effectively eliminating any functional dry season. As a result, the climate more closely resembles the wet oceanic conditions of northwest Europe than the semi-Mediterranean character typical of lower Madeiran elevations, supporting one of the best-preserved laurisilva forest ecosystems in the Macaronesian region.

Climate data for Queimadas, São Vicente, 1941–1970, altitude: 860 m (2,820 ft)
| Month | Jan | Feb | Mar | Apr | May | Jun | Jul | Aug | Sep | Oct | Nov | Dec | Year |
|---|---|---|---|---|---|---|---|---|---|---|---|---|---|
| Mean daily maximum °C (°F) | 12.4 (54.3) | 12.6 (54.7) | 13.5 (56.3) | 13.7 (56.7) | 15.2 (59.4) | 16.9 (62.4) | 19.1 (66.4) | 19.7 (67.5) | 20.4 (68.7) | 17.6 (63.7) | 14.9 (58.8) | 12.8 (55.0) | 15.7 (60.3) |
| Daily mean °C (°F) | 9.4 (48.9) | 9.6 (49.3) | 10.4 (50.7) | 10.6 (51.1) | 12.2 (54.0) | 13.8 (56.8) | 16.0 (60.8) | 16.6 (61.9) | 17.2 (63.0) | 14.5 (58.1) | 11.9 (53.4) | 9.8 (49.6) | 12.7 (54.9) |
| Mean daily minimum °C (°F) | 6.4 (43.5) | 6.6 (43.9) | 7.3 (45.1) | 7.5 (45.5) | 9.2 (48.6) | 10.7 (51.3) | 12.9 (55.2) | 13.5 (56.3) | 14.0 (57.2) | 11.4 (52.5) | 8.9 (48.0) | 6.8 (44.2) | 9.6 (49.3) |
| Average precipitation mm (inches) | 301.1 (11.85) | 250.5 (9.86) | 230.1 (9.06) | 150.4 (5.92) | 100.0 (3.94) | 61.1 (2.41) | 47.1 (1.85) | 69.5 (2.74) | 132.4 (5.21) | 284.8 (11.21) | 391.0 (15.39) | 296.6 (11.68) | 2,314.6 (91.13) |

Climate data for Santana, 1941–1970, altitude: 400 m (1,300 ft) (estimated, adjusted from Queimadas 860m)
| Month | Jan | Feb | Mar | Apr | May | Jun | Jul | Aug | Sep | Oct | Nov | Dec | Year |
|---|---|---|---|---|---|---|---|---|---|---|---|---|---|
| Mean daily maximum °C (°F) | 15.4 (59.7) | 15.6 (60.1) | 16.5 (61.7) | 16.7 (62.1) | 18.2 (64.8) | 19.9 (67.8) | 22.1 (71.8) | 22.7 (72.9) | 23.4 (74.1) | 20.6 (69.1) | 17.9 (64.2) | 15.8 (60.4) | 18.7 (65.7) |
| Daily mean °C (°F) | 12.4 (54.3) | 12.6 (54.7) | 13.4 (56.1) | 13.6 (56.5) | 15.2 (59.4) | 16.8 (62.2) | 19.0 (66.2) | 19.6 (67.3) | 20.2 (68.4) | 17.5 (63.5) | 14.9 (58.8) | 12.8 (55.0) | 15.7 (60.3) |
| Mean daily minimum °C (°F) | 9.4 (48.9) | 9.6 (49.3) | 10.3 (50.5) | 10.5 (50.9) | 12.2 (54.0) | 13.7 (56.7) | 15.9 (60.6) | 16.5 (61.7) | 17.0 (62.6) | 14.4 (57.9) | 11.9 (53.4) | 9.8 (49.6) | 12.6 (54.7) |
| Average precipitation mm (inches) | 244.4 (9.62) | 203.5 (8.01) | 186.9 (7.36) | 122.2 (4.81) | 81.2 (3.20) | 49.7 (1.96) | 38.3 (1.51) | 56.5 (2.22) | 107.6 (4.24) | 231.5 (9.11) | 317.8 (12.51) | 241.0 (9.49) | 1,880.6 (74.04) |

Santana parish has the largest number residents, while Arco de São Jorge is both the smallest, physically, and has the lowest number of residents, while Faial is the largest parish.

Santana is known for the traditional homes constructed with sloping triangular rooftops, and protected with straw. These were mainly rural homes, used by local farmers, during the settlement of the island, with white-painted walls, red doors and windows with blue trim. Most of the surviving buildings are tourist attractions, and maintained (for example, the straw roofs are replaced every four to five years).

== Economy ==
A tourist-themed park was constructed to exhibit examples of the island's early history and culture; the Madeira Theme Park is an ample area, on 7 acres (28,000 m^{2}) of land, where visitors discover the cultures of Madeira and Porto Santo. This includes exhibits on the island's history, artifacts used in daily life and cultural presentations, in a scenic environment.

== Notable citizens ==
- Teodósio de Gouveia (1889 in São Jorge - 1962 in Lourenço Marques) - Roman Catholic Cardinal for Lourenço Marques, and first resident Cardinal in Africa.
