= Arco de São Jorge =

- Civil parish
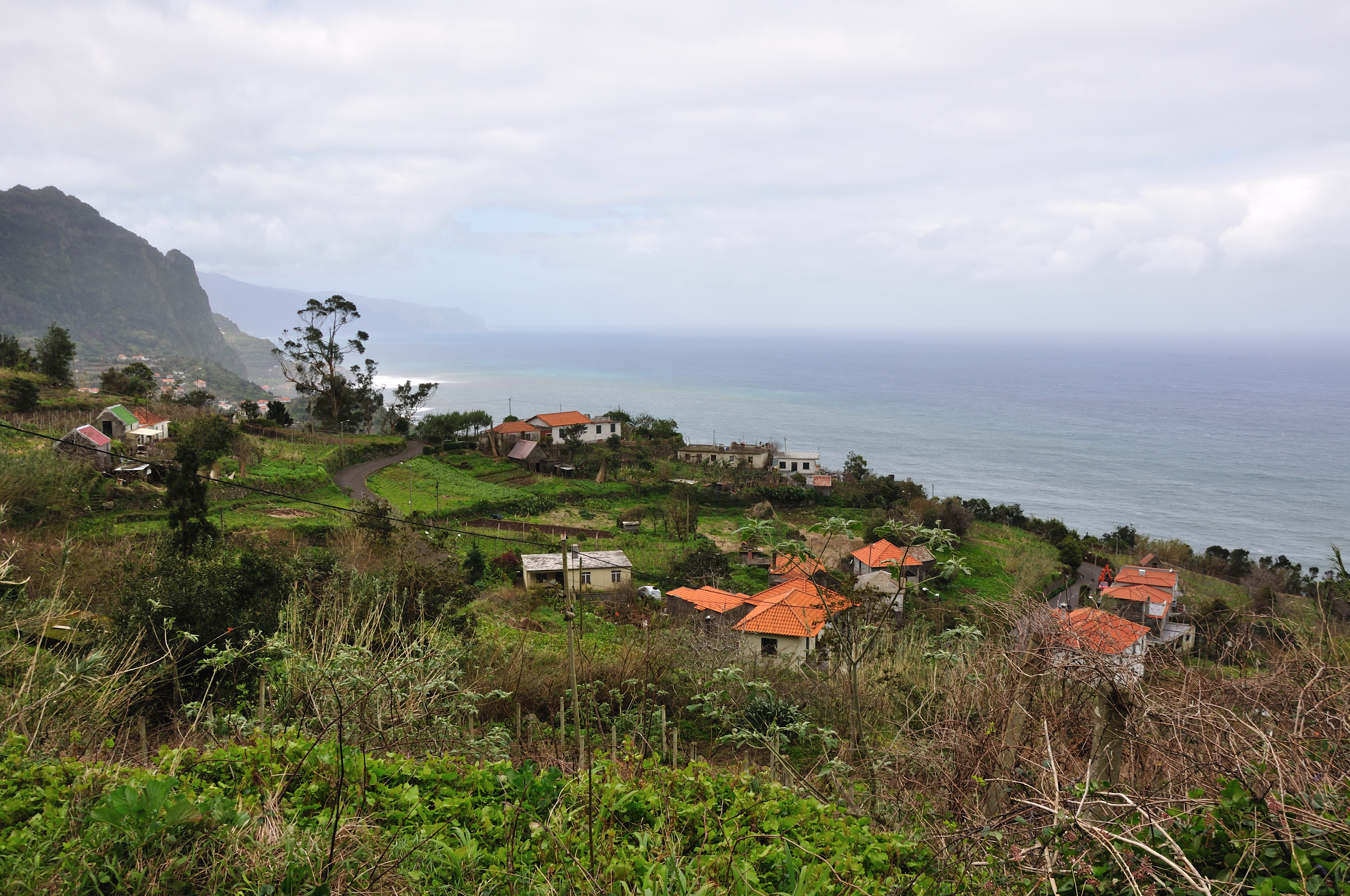

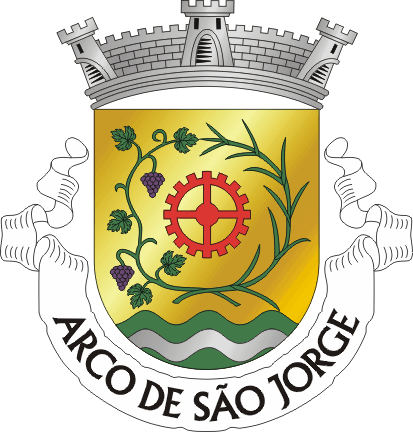
- Coat of arms

- Location in Madeira
- Coordinates: 32°49′18.78″N 16°57′12.61″W
- Country: Portugal
- Auton. region: Madeira
- Island: Madeira
- Municipality: Santana
- Established: Settlement: fl. 1500; Parish: 28 September 1588

Area
  - Total: 3.38 km^{2} (1.31 sq mi)
- Elevation: 325 m (1,066 ft)

Population (2011)
  - Total: 413
  - Density: 122/km^{2} (316/sq mi)
- Time zone: UTC+00:00 (WET)
  - Summer (DST): UTC+01:00 (WEST)
- Postal code: 9230
- Area code: 291
- Patron: São José

Arco de São Jorge is a civil parish in the municipality of Santana, the Portuguese island of Madeira. The population in 2011 was 413, in an area of 3.38 km²; it is the smallest parish of the municipality by population and area.

== Geography ==
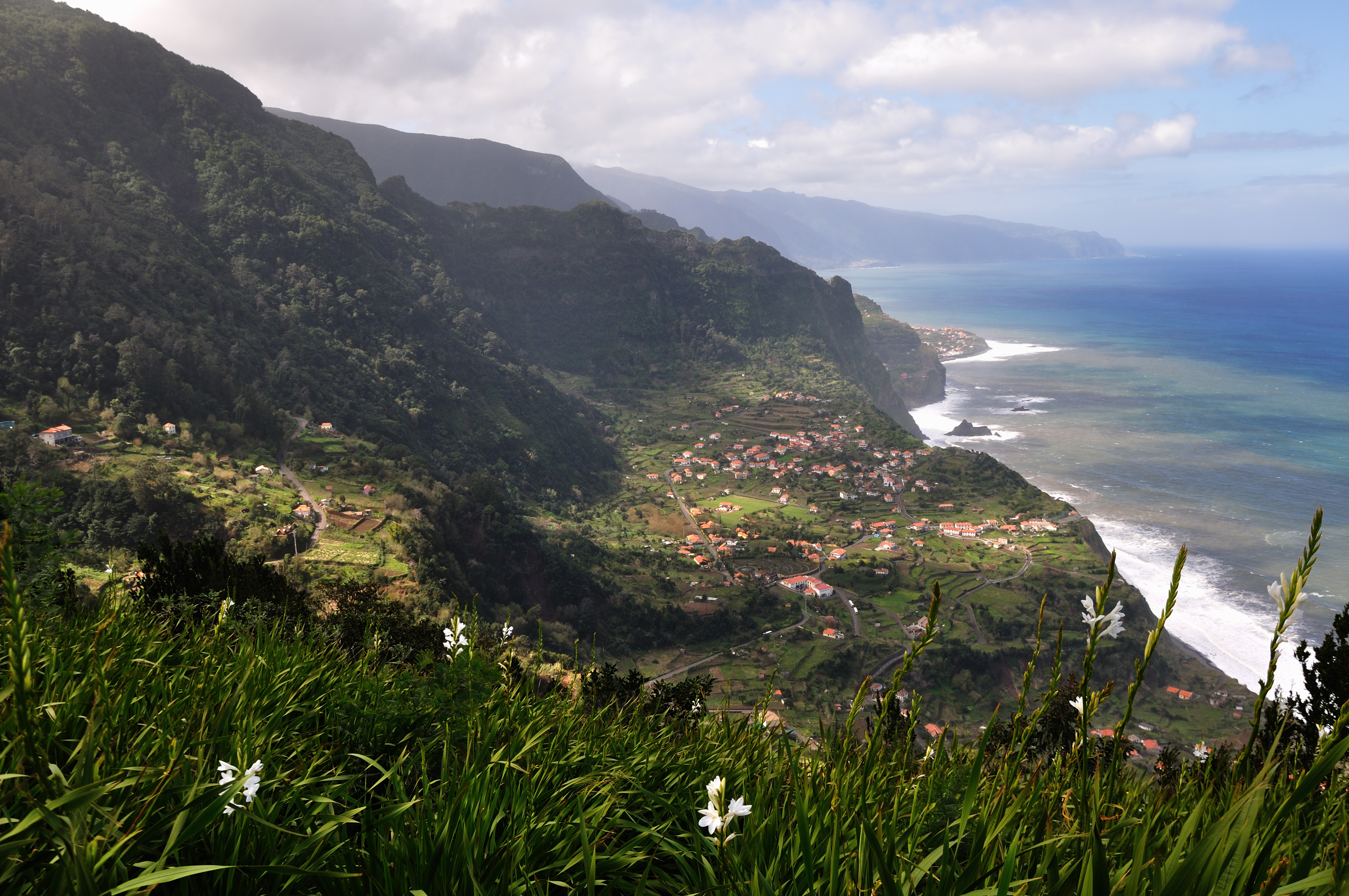
The fajã debris field that comprises the small parish of Arco de São Jorge

Arco de São Jorge is located near the north coast of the island, in the northwest of the municipality of Santana.
