= Faial (Santana) =

- Civil parish
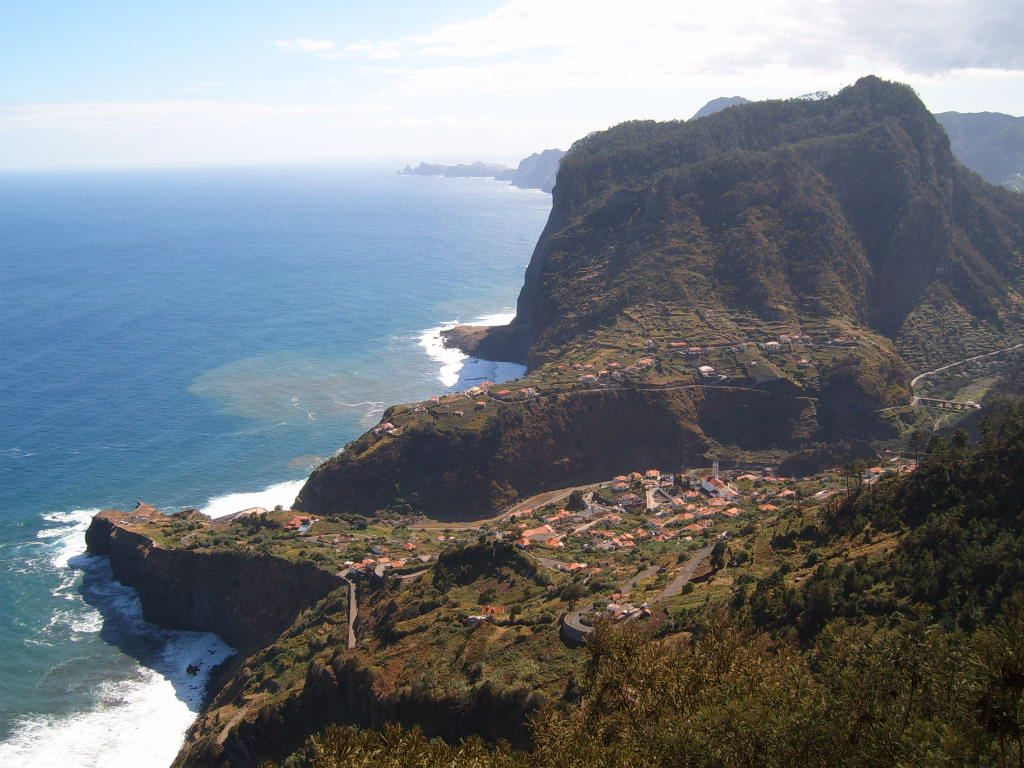
- Penha de Águia in Faial

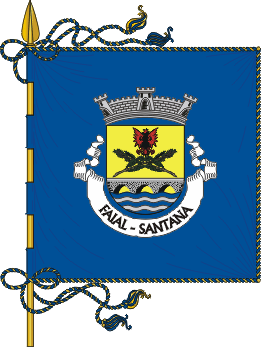
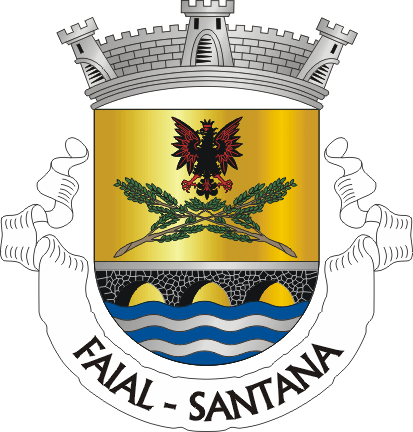
- Flag Coat of arms

- Location in Madeira
- Coordinates: 32°46′56″N 16°51′22″W
- Country: Portugal
- Auton. region: Madeira
- Island: Madeira
- Municipality: Santana
- Established: 20 February 1550

Area
  - Total: 24.03 km^{2} (9.28 sq mi)

Population (2011)
  - Total: 1,567
  - Density: 65.21/km^{2} (168.9/sq mi)
- Time zone: UTC+00:00 (WET)
  - Summer (DST): UTC+01:00 (WEST)
- Postal code: 9230-059
- Area code: 291
- Patron: Nossa Senhora da Natividade

Faial is a civil parish in the Madeiran municipality of Santana located along the northern coast of the island of Madeira. The population in 2011 was 1,567, in an area of 24.03 km².

== History ==
It was founded on February 20, 1550 by settlers who chose the name Faial, for the common name for the Myrica faya, shrubs that are indigenous to the area, growing within the valleys between the mountains. As later recounted, the settlers:

"Seeing a site of Faias, where the sea is more gentle, with an ideal panorama, that perfect corner, is the vista of Faial."

For a while Porto da Cruz and São Roque do Faial were part of the parish, but were de-annexed to form their own parishes.

In 1519, a chapel was constructed in this parish to the invocation of Nossa Senhora da Natividade (English: Our Lady of the Nativity), and as legend describes it was built entirely from one cedar, which was transported by water to its site. Ribeiras da Metade e do Faial. The construction of the new temple was begun during the reign of King D. João V of Portugal, during the second half of the 18th Century (1771). In addition, a chapel was dedicated to Nossa Senhora da Penha de França (English: Our Lady of the Rock of France), in Fazenda, around 1680.

In 1960, a fire completely destroyed the original church in Faial, and it was reconstructed in 1966 through the initiative of Father António Pestana Martinho.

== Geography ==
The parish is located between the municipal of seat of Santana and the parish of São Roque do Faial, 21 kilometres north Funchal the regional capital, while 5 kilometres from Porto da Cruz, 15 kilometres from Machico and 39 kilometres from Porto Moniz; it is connected to these centres by a Regional Roadway network that gives its inhabitants limited access to southern communities.

Faial consists of the localities Moinhos, Longueira, Penha De Águia, Fajã, Lombo de Cima, Lombo de Baixo, Cruzinhas, Fajã Grande, Limoeiro, Fajã da Murta, Lombo Galego, Pico do Lombo Galego, Quebrada, Água De Alto, Ressoca, Corujeira de Cima, Corujeira de Baixo, Fazenda, Diferença, Lombo Lourenço, Igreja, Covas, Pico do Guindaste, Guindaste and Fajã do Mar.
