= Pico do Areeiro =

Madeira island's third highest peak

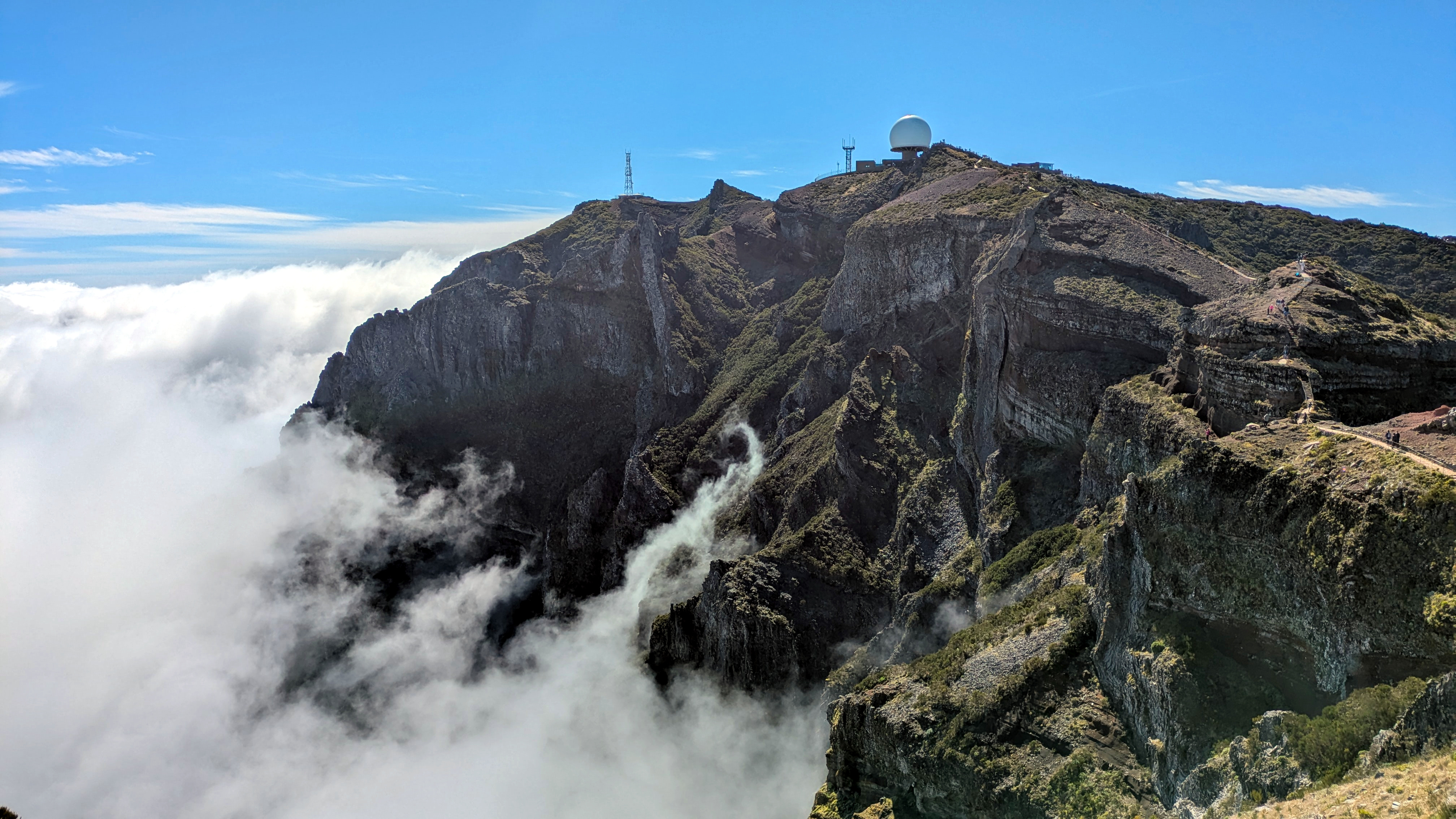
- View of Pico Do Areeiro from north-west

Highest point
- Elevation: 1,818 m (5,965 ft)
- Coordinates: 32°44′08″N 16°55′44″W

Geography
- Location within Madeira
- Location: Madeira

Pico do Areeiro (European Portuguese pronunciation: [ɐɾiˈɐjɾu]), at 1,818 m (5,965 ft) high is a mountain located on the Portuguese island and autonomous region of Madeira, the third highest on the island. Situated within the mountainous interior of the island roughly halfway between the northern and southern coasts. It is a popular year round tourist attraction with the summit accessible by road directly from Funchal. On a clear day it is possible to see the neighboring island of Porto Santo, 48 km (30 mi) to the northeast.

The summit is used as a starting point for hikers heading to Pico Ruivo (the highest point in Madeira) and at peak times up to 1000 people a day can pass by the area.

The peak has in recent times become popular with cyclists making the ascent from Funchal. Many cycling publications and online lists usually claim that the climb from sea level to the summit at Areeiro is one of the toughest in the world with 1810 meters of climbing over a very short distance of 22 kilometres.

There is easy road access to the summit, with a large car park, a restaurant and souvenir shop. In 2011, an Air Defence Radar Station of the Portuguese Air Force was built at the top of the mountain near the tourist facilities.

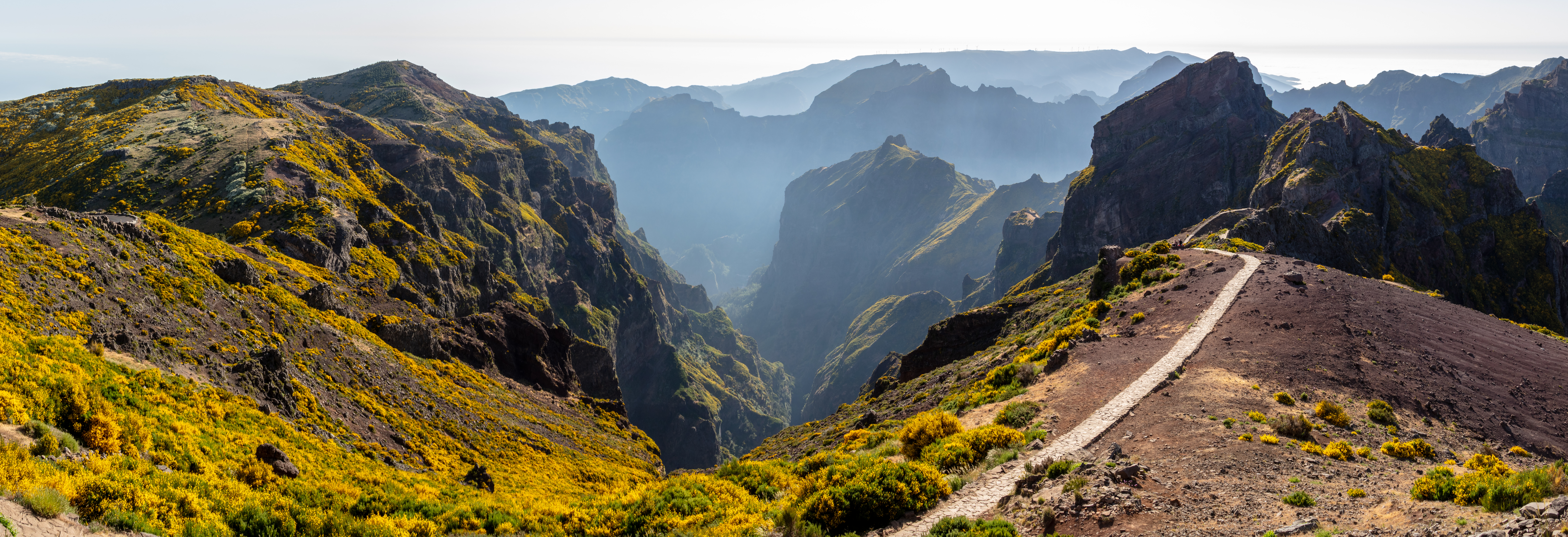
View from the summit

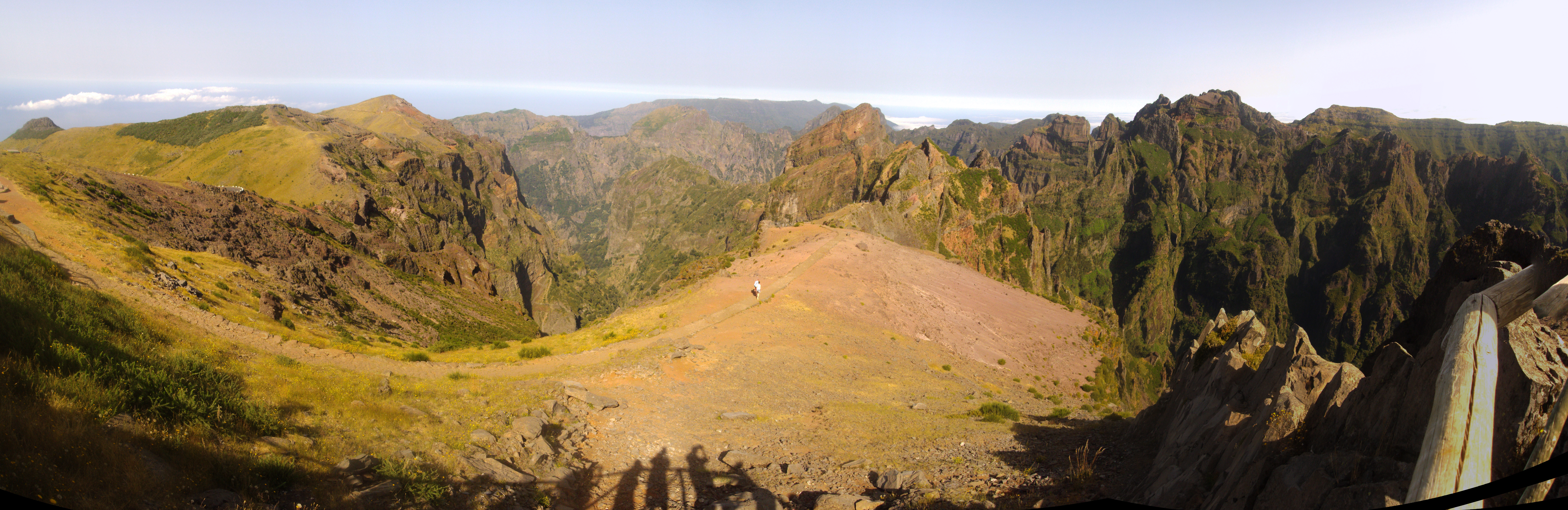
Panoramic view from Pico do Arieiro. The footpath from Pico do Arieiro to Pico Ruivo can be seen in the center of the picture.

== Climate ==
Pico do Areeiro has a cool Mediterranean climate, surprisingly wet for this type of climate due to the extreme precipitation it gets, a big part of it from drizzle and fog.

Climate data for Pico do Areeiro (1961-1990) 1,610 m (5,280 ft)
Month	Jan	Feb	Mar	Apr	May	Jun	Jul	Aug	Sep	Oct	Nov	Dec	Year
Mean daily maximum °C (°F)	8.1 (46.6)	8.4 (47.1)	9.0 (48.2)	9.0 (48.2)	11.4 (52.5)	14.4 (57.9)	18.5 (65.3)	18.8 (65.8)	16.1 (61.0)	13.2 (55.8)	10.4 (50.7)	8.5 (47.3)	12.1 (53.9)
Daily mean °C (°F)	5.5 (41.9)	5.6 (42.1)	6.2 (43.2)	6.1 (43.0)	8.2 (46.8)	11.0 (51.8)	14.6 (58.3)	14.8 (58.6)	12.8 (55.0)	10.3 (50.5)	7.8 (46.0)	6.0 (42.8)	9.1 (48.3)
Mean daily minimum °C (°F)	2.9 (37.2)	2.8 (37.0)	3.4 (38.1)	3.2 (37.8)	5.0 (41.0)	7.6 (45.7)	10.7 (51.3)	10.8 (51.4)	9.5 (49.1)	7.4 (45.3)	5.2 (41.4)	3.5 (38.3)	6.0 (42.8)
Record low °C (°F)	−3.0 (26.6)	−4.3 (24.3)	−4.3 (24.3)	−6.0 (21.2)	−0.9 (30.4)	1.0 (33.8)	2.4 (36.3)	4.3 (39.7)	3.3 (37.9)	0.0 (32.0)	−2.5 (27.5)	−3.0 (26.6)	−6.0 (21.2)
Average precipitation mm (inches)	437.0 (17.20)	371.6 (14.63)	302.4 (11.91)	211.3 (8.32)	116.6 (4.59)	69.8 (2.75)	13.2 (0.52)	33.5 (1.32)	169.7 (6.68)	306.8 (12.08)	448.9 (17.67)	447.0 (17.60)	2,927.8 (115.27)
Source: University of Lisbon
