= Madeira Island =

East Atlantic Portuguese island

Madeira
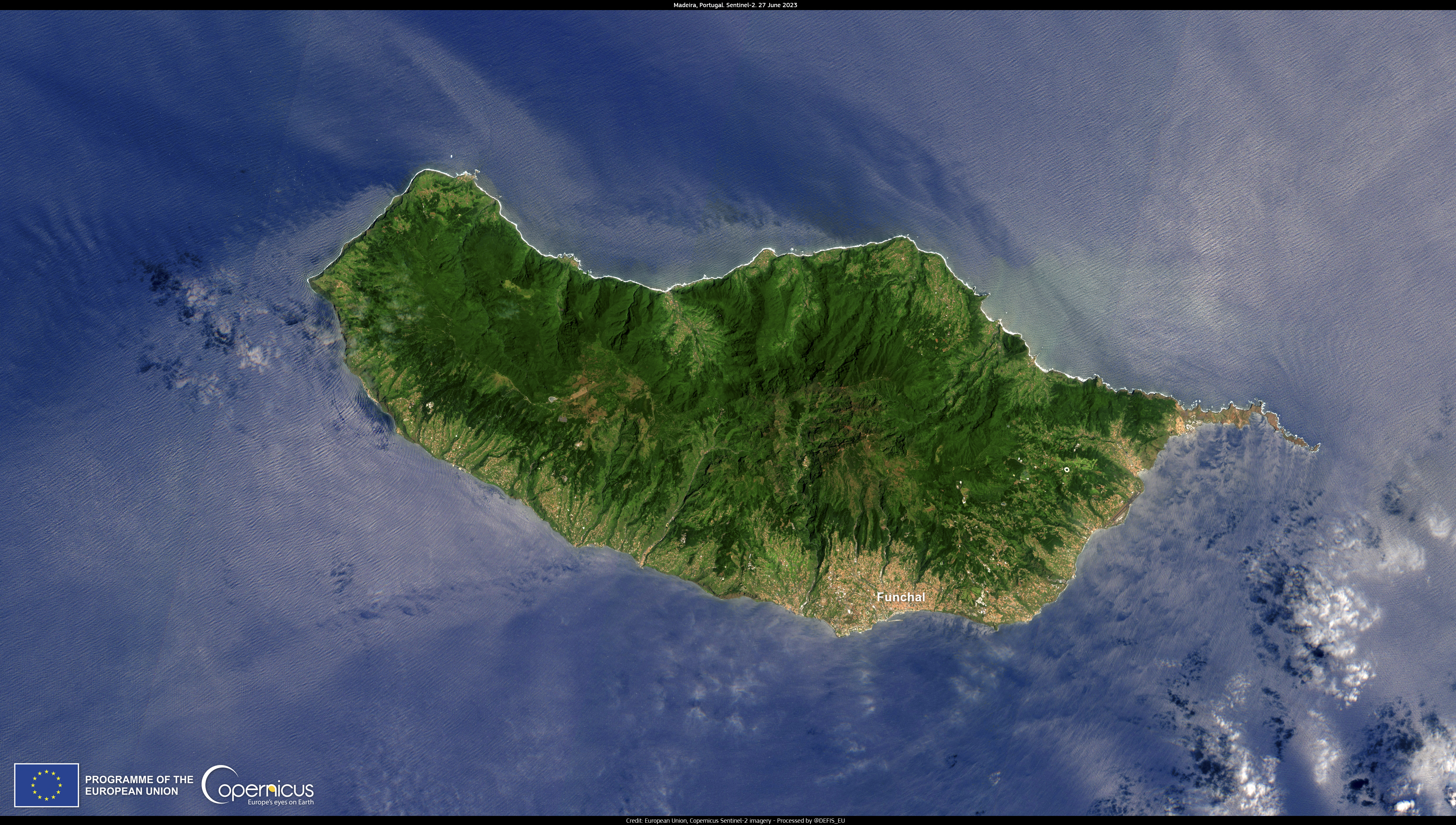
- Satellite image of Madeira by the Copernicus Sentinel-2 satellite

- Location of Madeira

Geography
- Location: Atlantic Ocean
- Coordinates: 32°39′4″N 16°54′35″W
- Archipelago: Madeira Archipelago
- Adjacent to: Atlantic Ocean
- Area: 740.7 km^{2} (286.0 sq mi)
- Highest point: Pico Ruivo; 1,862 m (6,109 ft)

Administration
- Portugal
- Autonomous Region: Madeira
- Capital and largest City: Funchal

Demographics
- Population: 245,595 (2021)

Madeira is a Portuguese island, and is the largest and most populous of the Madeira Archipelago. It has an area of 740.7 km^{2} (286 sq mi), including Ilhéu de Agostinho, Ilhéu de São Lourenço, Ilhéu Mole (northwest). As of 2021, Madeira had a total population of 245,595.

The island is the top of a massive submerged shield volcano that rises about six kilometres (20,000 ft) from the floor of the Atlantic Ocean. The volcano formed atop an east–west rift in the oceanic crust along the African Plate, beginning during the Miocene epoch over five million years ago, continuing into the Pleistocene until about 700,000 years ago. This was followed by extensive erosion, producing two large amphitheatres open to south in the central part of the island. Volcanic activity later resumed, producing scoria cones and lava flows atop the older eroded shield. The most recent volcanic eruptions were on the west-central part of the island only 6,500 years ago, creating more cinder cones and lava flows.

Madeira is the largest island of the group with an area of 741 km^{2} (286 sq mi), a length of 57 km (35 mi) (from Ponta de São Lourenço to Ponta do Pargo), while approximately 22 km (14 mi) at its widest point (from Ponta da Cruz to Ponta de São Jorge), with a coastline of 150 km (90 mi). It has a mountain ridge that extends along the centre of the island, reaching 1,862 m (6,109 ft) at its highest point (Pico Ruivo), while much lower (below 200 m or 660 ft) along its eastern extent. The primitive volcanic foci responsible for the central mountainous area, consisted of the peaks: Ruivo (1,862 m or 6,109 ft), Torres (1,851 m or 6,073 ft), Arieiro (1,818 m or 5,965 ft), Cidrão (1,802 m or 5,912 ft), Cedro (1,759 m or 5,771 ft), Casado (1,725 m or 5,659 ft), Grande (1,657 m or 5,436 ft), Ferreiro (1,582 m or 5,190 ft). At the end of this eruptive phase, an island circled by reefs was formed, its marine vestiges are evident in a calcareous layer in the area of Lameiros, in São Vicente (which was later explored for calcium oxide production). Sea cliffs, such as Cabo Girão, valleys and ravines extend from this central spine, making the interior generally inaccessible. Daily life is concentrated in the many villages at the mouths of the ravines, through which the heavy rains of autumn and winter usually travel to the sea.

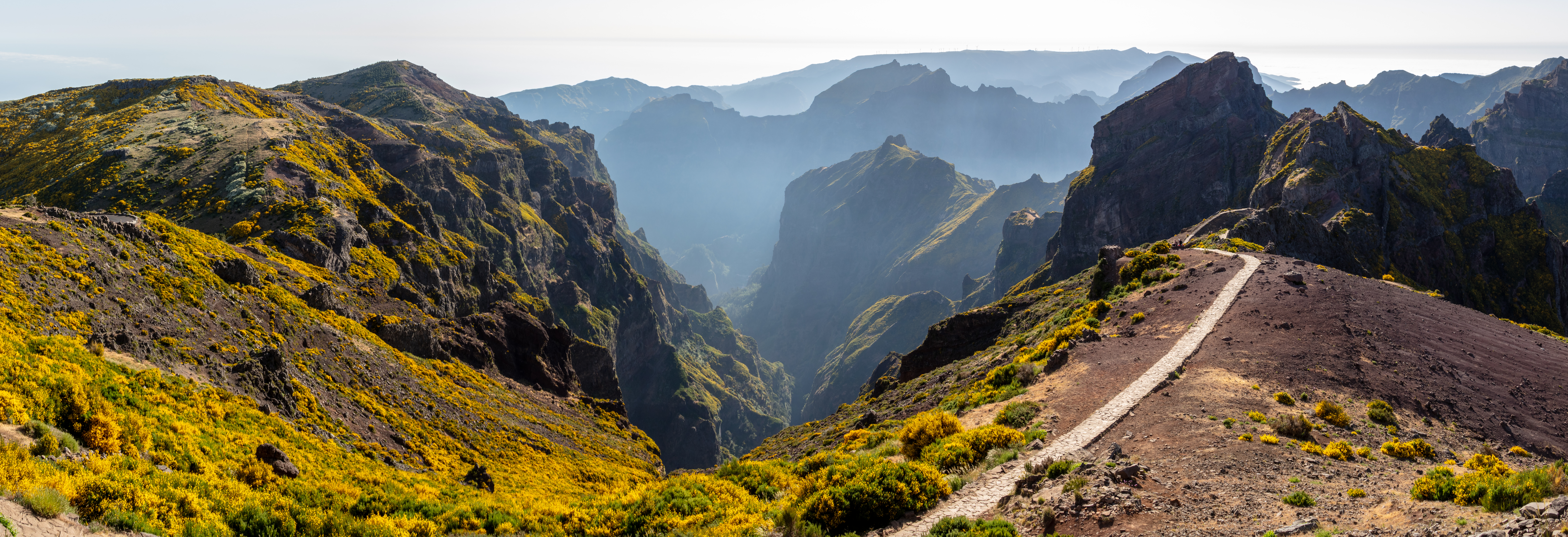
View from Pico do Arieiro
Seamounts of Northeastern Atlantic between Madeira and continental Portugal with Madeira archipelago on the bottom left corner

== See also ==
- Madeira, the archipelago and Autonomous Region named after Madeira Island
