= VR1, Madeira =

Limited access highway in Madeira, Portugal

- Portuguese: Via Rápida 1
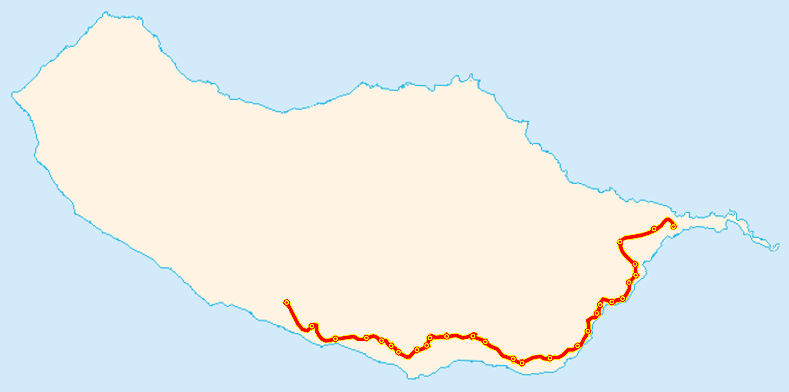

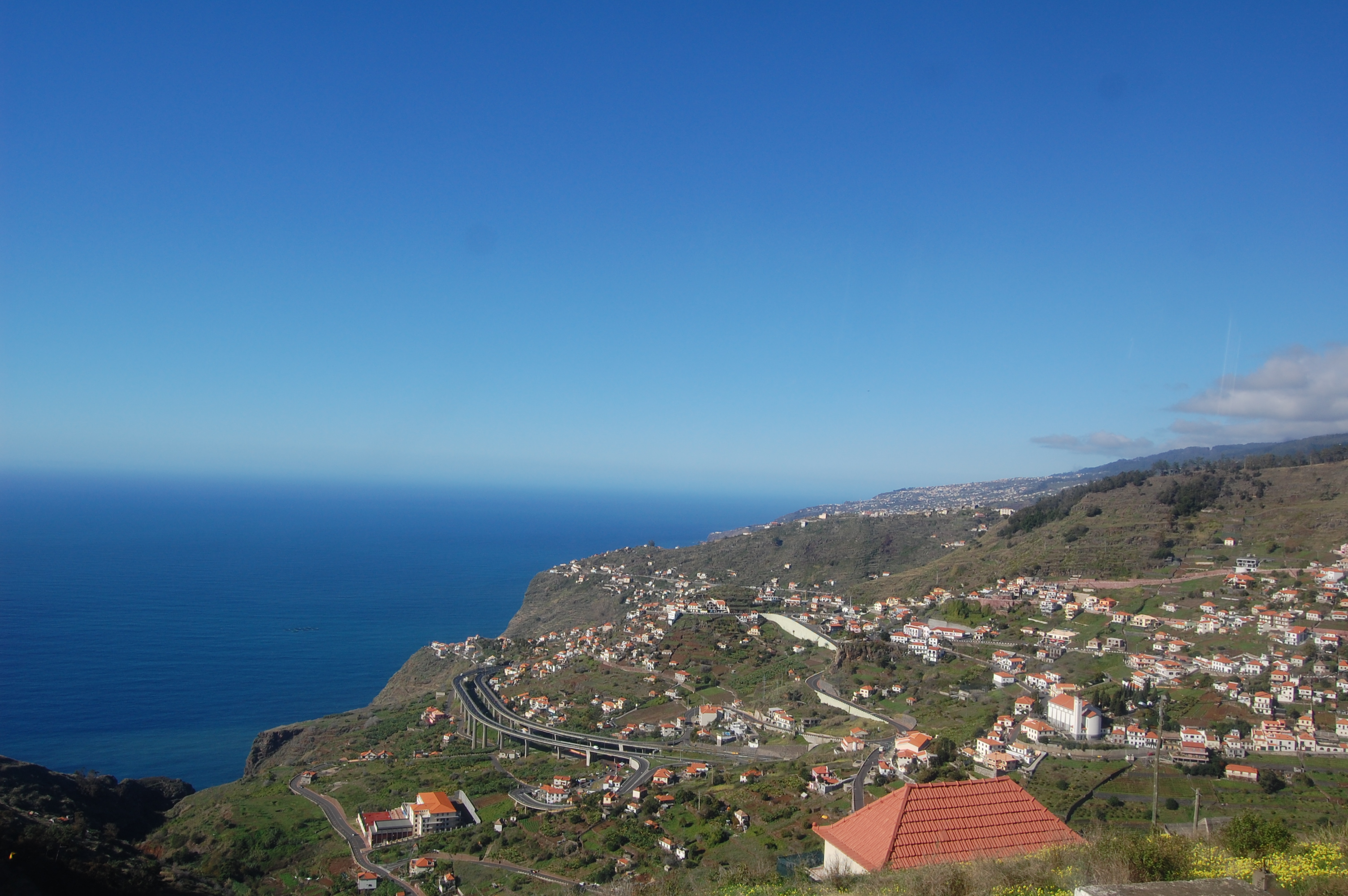

Route information
- Length: 44 km (27 mi)

Major junctions
- West end: Ribeira Brava
- East end: Porto do Caniçal

Location
- Country: Portugal

Highway system
- Roads in Portugal

The Via Rápida 1 or VR1 (Expressway No. 1 in English) is the first motorway in Madeira, Portugal. Since April 2017, there is another motorway in the island called VR2. Construction started in 1989 and was completed in 2005.

With 44 km, it goes from Ribeira Brava to Porto do Caniçal, providing a fast connection between Funchal and the Madeira International Airport. This motorway is also known as Cota 200.

== Junctions ==
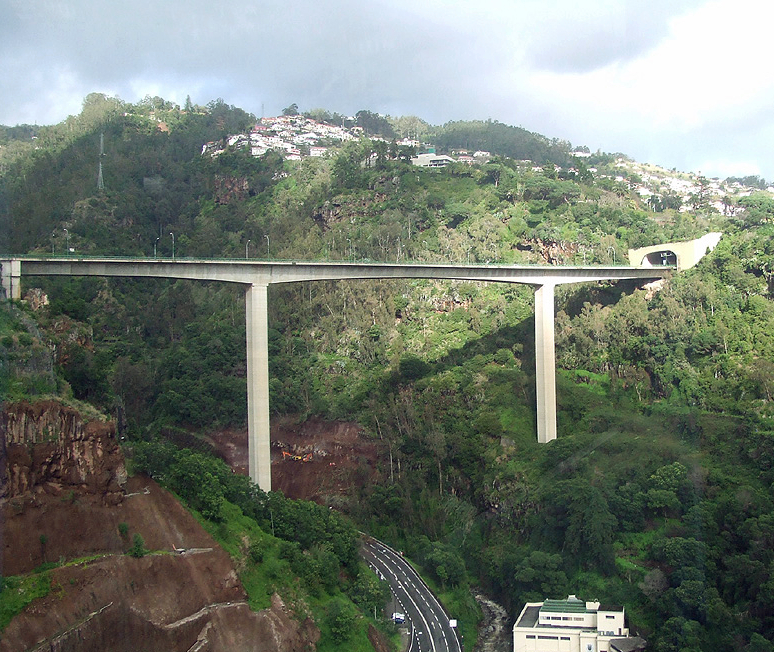
João Gomes Bridge, which crosses the Ribeira of the same name 140m below. Built in 1997.

There are 27 Junctions and 30 tunnels in total.

Junction ( Nó )	Km
Ribeira Brava ( 1 ) – Campanário	3,200
Ribeira Brava - 1800 m / 1805 m (consoante o sentido)
Amoreira - 130 m / 142 m
Campanário ( 2 ) – Quinta Grande	2,645
Campanário - 310 m / 336 m
Vera Cruz - 354 m / 345 m
Quinta Grande - 932 m / 942 m
Quinta Grande ( 3 ) – Alforra	2,550
Cabo Girão - 1200 m
Caldeira - 210 m / 304 m
Alforra - 368 m / 418 m
Alforra ( 4 ) – Ponte dos Frades	1,350
Preces - 280 m
Quinta do Leme - 161 m / 200 m
Ponte dos Frades ( 5 ) – Câmara Lobos	0,765
Câmara Lobos ( 6 ) – Quebradas	1,010
Quebradas ( 7 ) – Esmeraldo	1,850
Esmeraldo ( 8 ) – Pilar	0,625
Pilar ( 9 ) – Santo António	0,850
Santo António ( 10 ) – Santa Luzia	1,300
João Abel de Freitas - 568 m / 581 m
Santa Luzia ( 11 ) – Pestana Júnior	1,450
Marmeleiros - 705 m / 738 m
Quinta da Palmeira - 243 m / 264 m
Pestana Júnior ( 12 ) – Boa Nova	1,900
João Gomes - 138 m / 140 m
Jardim Botânico - 210 m / 208 m
REPSOL Cota 200 - Km 18,900
Boa Nova ( 13 ) – Pinheiro Grande	2,375
Pinheiro Grande - 378 m / 382 m
Pinheiro Grande ( 14 ) – Cancela	0,800
Cancela - 354 m / 353 m
Cancela ( 15 ) – Caniço	2,075
Abegoaria Oeste - 315 m
Abegoaria Este - 300 m / 360 m
Caniço ( 16 ) – Porto Novo	2,725
Mãe de Deus - 230 m
Porto Novo ( 17 ) – Gaula	1,300
Gaula ( 18 ) – Boaventura	1,700
REPSOL Gaula - Km 29,550 (apenas no sentido Este-Oeste)
Gaula - 160 m (apenas no sentido Este-Oeste)
Boaventura ( 19 ) – São Pedro	0,400
São Pedro ( 20 ) – Santa Cruz	1,550
Santa Cruz Oeste - 150 m
Santa Cruz Este - 110 m
Santa Catarina - 240 m
Santa Cruz ( 21 ) – Aeroporto Gare	1,636
Aeroporto Gare ( 22 ) – Aeroporto Leste	0,800
Aeroporto Leste ( 23 ) – Água de Pena	0,914
Água de Pena ( 24 ) – Machico Sul	1,168
Queimada II - 745 m / 730 m
Machico Sul ( 25 ) – Machico Norte	2,252
Piquinho - 437 m / 460 m
Machico Norte ( 26 ) – Caniçal Oeste	2,945
Fazenda - 162 m / 180 m
Duplo Caniçal - 2140 m / 2160 m
Caniçal Oeste ( 27 ) – Porto do Caniçal ( 28 )	2,063
Portais - 700 m / 740 m
Palmeira - 940 m / 900 m
Porto do Caniçal	44,198
