= VR2 =

- Portuguese: Via Rápida 2
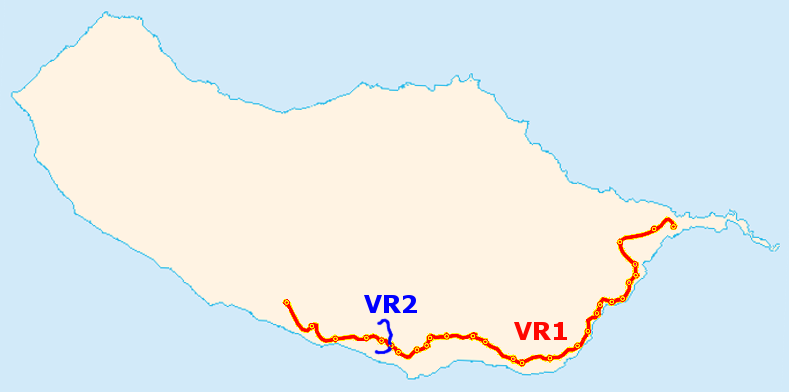

Route information
- Length: 3.7 km (2.3 mi)

Major junctions
- South end: Câmara de Lobos
- North end: Estreito de Câmara de Lobos

Location
- Country: Portugal

Highway system
- Roads in Portugal

The Via Rápida 2 or VR2 (Expressway No. 2 in English) is the second motorway on the island of Madeira. Construction started in 2008 In 2011, this construction had to stop due to lands owners and the financial crisis in Portugal In 2015, the construction resumed with funding from the European Regional Development Fund and it was finally opened in 25 April 2017.

With 3,7 km it goes from Câmara de Lobos to Estreito de Câmara de Lobos, providing a fast connection between the downtown of Câmara de Lobos and the North of the same municipality, Jardim da Serra, Estreito de Câmara de Lobos and Covão.

== Junctions ==
There are 4 Junctions and 3 tunnels in total.

Junction ( Nó )	Km
Fonte da Rocha (Cidade Nova)	0,000
Fonte da Rocha - Pedreira do Barradas	1,200
Pedreira do Barradas	1,300
Fonte da Rocha ( 1 ) – Pedreira do Barradas	1,300
Covão	0,335 / 0,390
Pedreira do Barradas ( 2 ) – Vargem	1,500
Vargem ( 3 ) – Covão	1,000
Vargem ( 4 ) – Estreito de Câmara de Lobos	0,900
