= Estreito de Câmara de Lobos =

- Civil parish
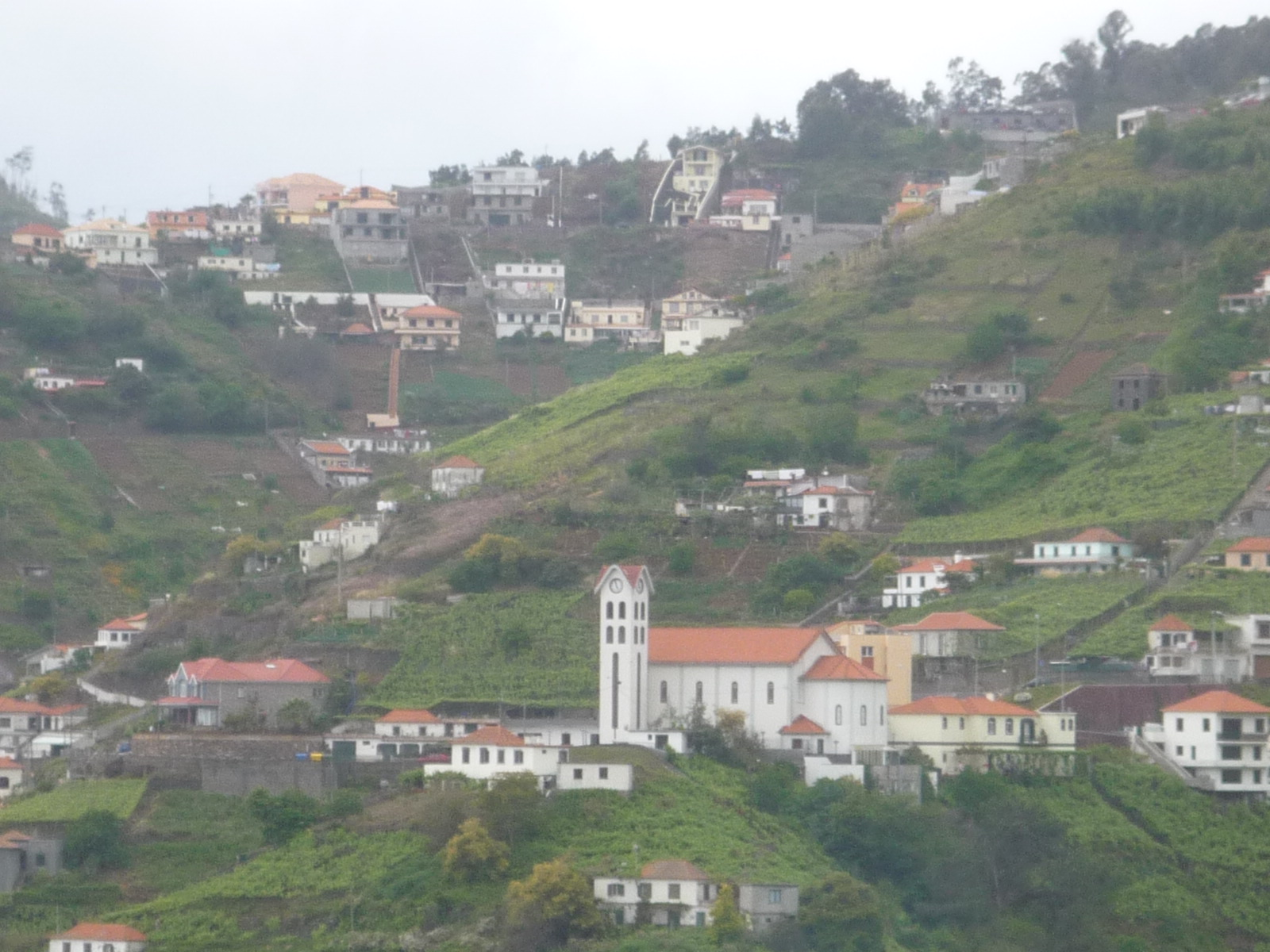
- The settlement of Garachico, with the Church of Nossa Senhora do Bom Sucesso in the foreground, as seen in the Ribeira da Caixa from the centre of Estreito

- Location in Madeira
- Coordinates: 32°40′33″N 16°58′38″W
- Country: Portugal
- Auton. region: Madeira
- Island: Madeira
- Municipality: Câmara de Lobos
- Established: Settlement: fl. 1440; Parish: c. 1509; Town: 14 September 1994

Area
  - Total: 7.87 km^{2} (3.04 sq mi)
- Elevation: 506 m (1,660 ft)

Population (2011)
  - Total: 10,269
  - Density: 1,300/km^{2} (3,380/sq mi)
- Time zone: UTC+00:00 (WET)
  - Summer (DST): UTC+01:00 (WEST)
- Postal code: 9325 - 023
- Area code: 291
- Website: www.fregestreitodecamaradelobos.pt

Estreito de Câmara de Lobos (Portuguese pronunciation: [ɨˈʃtɾɐjtu ðɨ ˈkɐmɐɾɐ ðɨ ˈloβuʃ]; Portuguese for strait of Câmara de Lobos) is a civil parish in the municipality of Câmara de Lobos in the archipelago of Madeira. The population in 2011 was 10,629, in an area of 7.87 km². Apart from its construction services and commerce, Estreito de Câmara do Lobos is important for its cultivation of grapes, for the production of Madeira wine.

== History ==
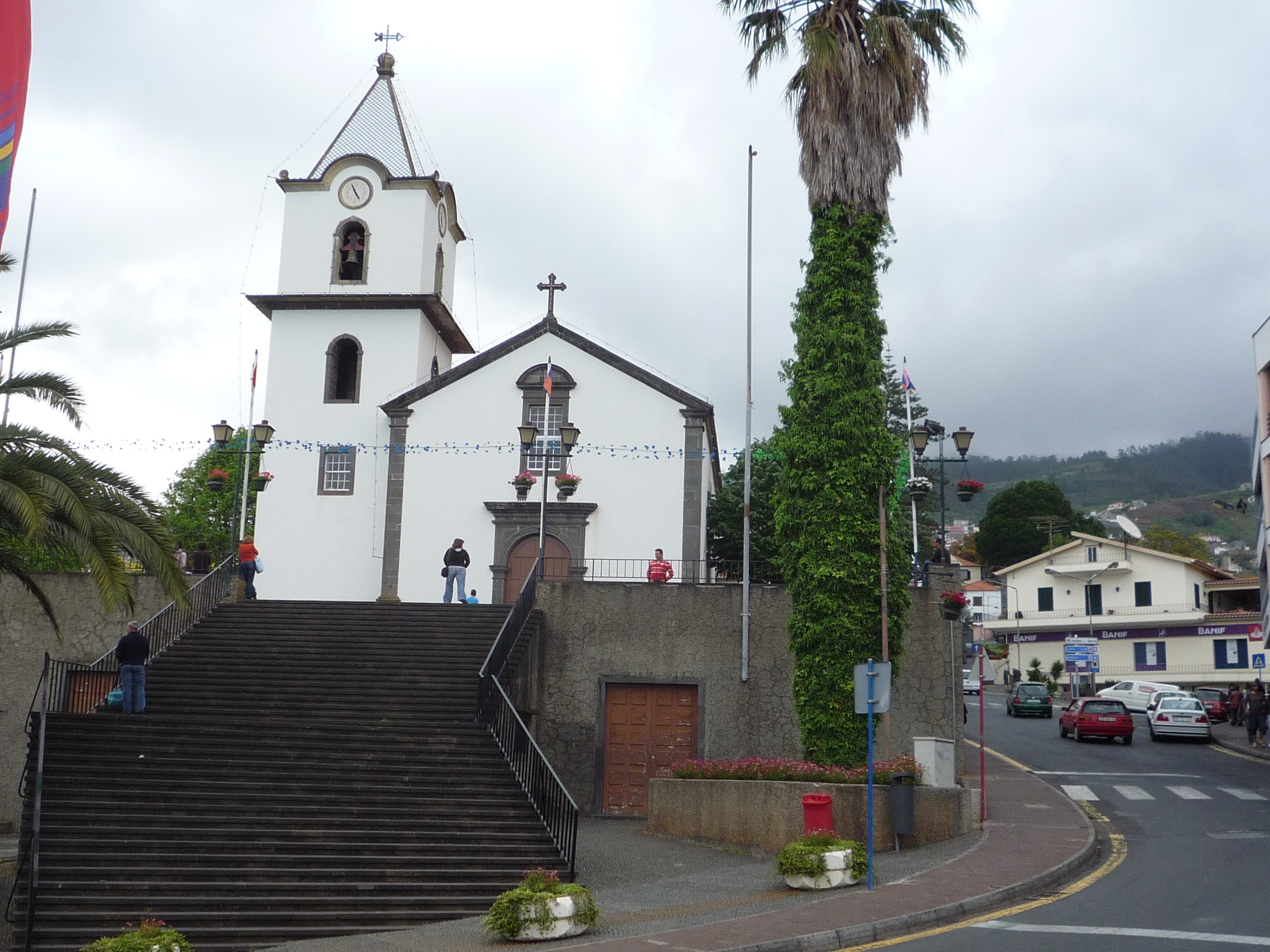
Church of Nossa Senhora da Graça

The parishes name derives from oral tradition; although there are no dates affixed to the origin of the parish, the Estreito de Câmara de Lobos is associated with a small place situated near the parochial church, known for its physical characteristics as a strait; its history developed from there, and residents commonly referred to the area around the church as the estreito.

The parish was created in 1509, long after the first religious institutions were celebrated; parish records indicate that Franciscan clergy used to celebrate masses in an old chapel of wood around 1440 in the area of the parochial church.

On 14 September 1994, the parish was elevated to the status of town, published in the Diário da República (Series A, nº213/14 September 1994).

== Geography ==
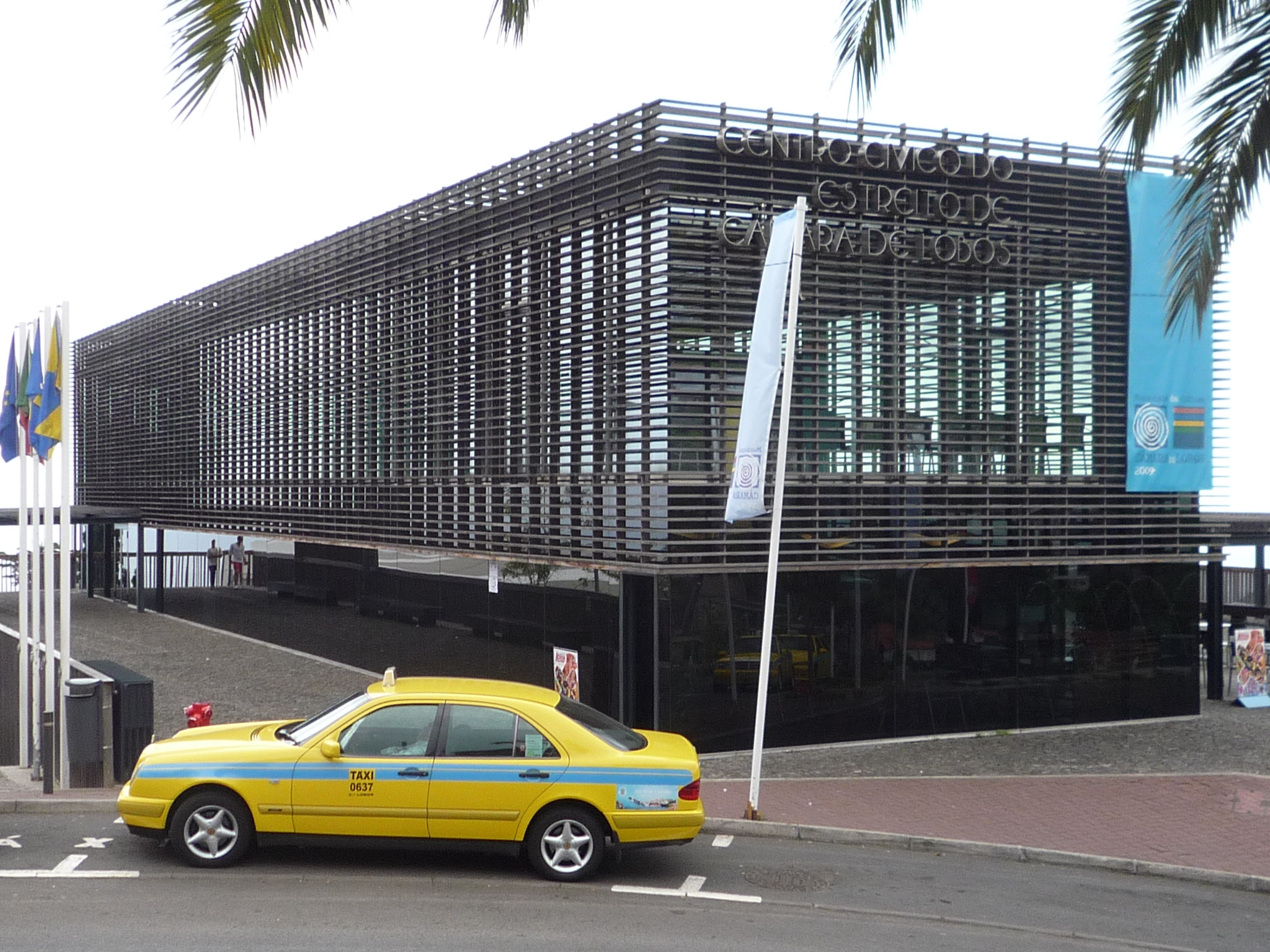
The modernist Civic Centre in Estreito de Câmara de Lobos

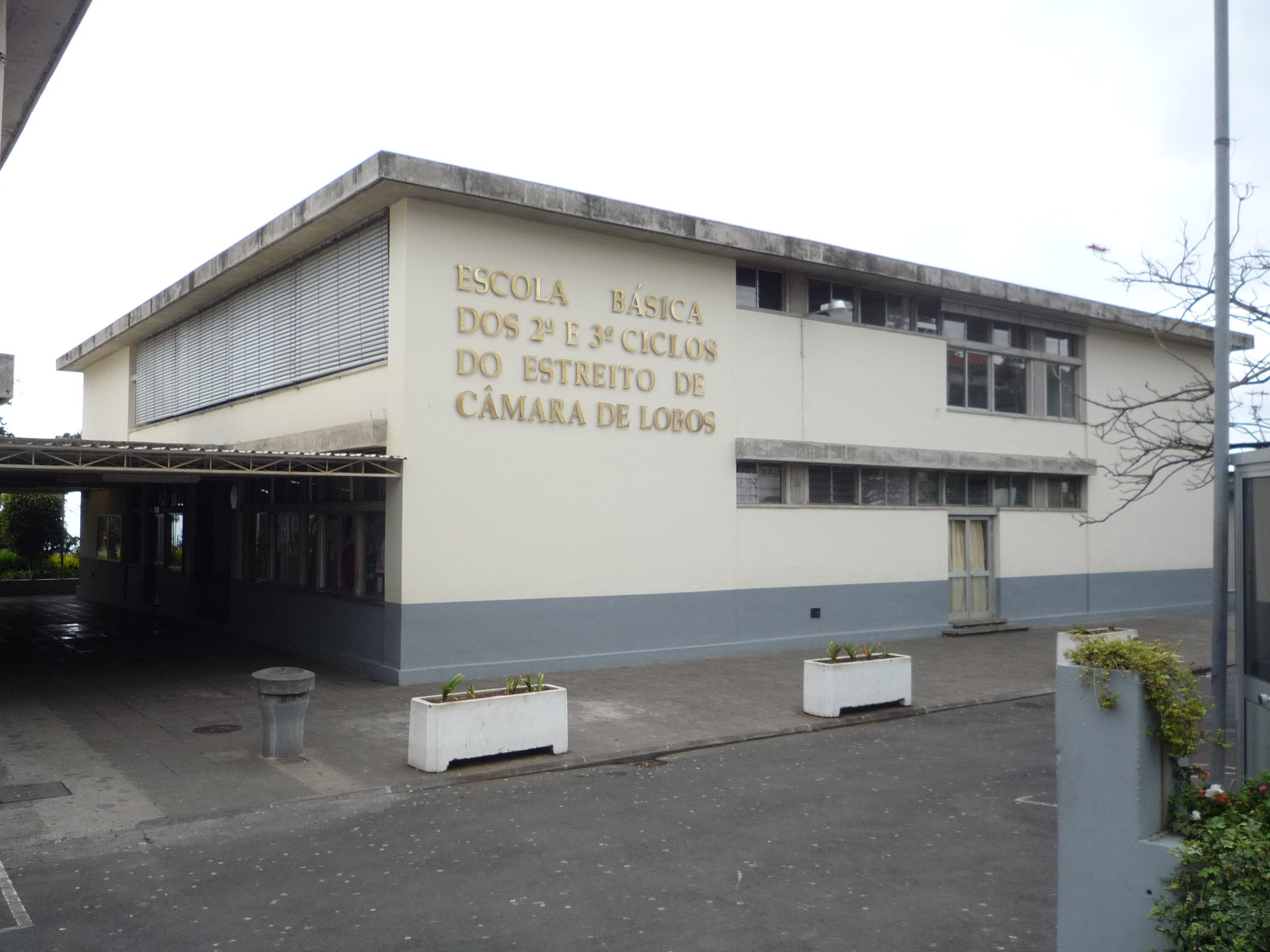
Early 1970s architecture of the primary school, where classes to junior high school are taught

Estreito is bordered on the south and west by the parish of Câmara de Lobos, to the north by Jardim da Serra, to the west by Quinta Grande, and on its eastern border with the municipality of Funchal.

The north of the parish is primarily elevated mountains, where traditional levadas (earthen constructions) still function; these courses were used to transport water by gravity to the population centres and agricultural tracts along its course.

Many older manor homes still pepper the foothills of the parish, that were used as summer homes by nobles and merchants from old Funchal, marked by belvederes and lookouts, such Boca dos Namorados, Boca da Corrida and Jardim da Serra. It has a few schools, two churches and a civic centre.

The population of Estreito represents 29.6% the municipality's population, although this has varied considerably within the last 50 years: this includes the loss of many people from the de-annexation of Jardim da Serra, as well as emigration and population shifts within the island. Regardless, of the five parishes that make-up Câmara de Lobos, Estreito had the second largest birth rate (16.9%), along with a high percentage of youth 0–14 years of age (25.7% or 2630). This was attributed by the local parish government with the settling of more families in the region, with young children or by young adults. Instituto Nacional de Estatística (INE) records indicate approximately 2715 families in 2001, mostly composed of large families with many children, similarly reflected in 3217 family homes established in the parish.

The main settlements of the parish are Barreiros, Cabo do Podão, Casa Caída, Castelejo, Covão, Fajã das Galinhas, Fontes, Foro, Garachico, Igreja, Marinheira, Panasqueira, Pomar do Meio, Picos e Salões, Quinta de Santo António, Ribeira da Caixa Ribeira Fernanda, Romeiras and Vargem.

== Economy ==
At the time of its ascension to town, its population included 13000 inhabitants, dedicated to construction, commerce, horticulture and agriculture, specifically the cultivation of grapes for wine and cherries. The parish is important in Maderia wine production, being the heaviest producer of the spirit in the region, as well as its prime beef cattle. Weekly, the centre of Estreito is taken over on Sunday by merchants to sell products in the market, materials for construction, off-the-rack clothing, animals and the negotiation of services.

== Gallery ==
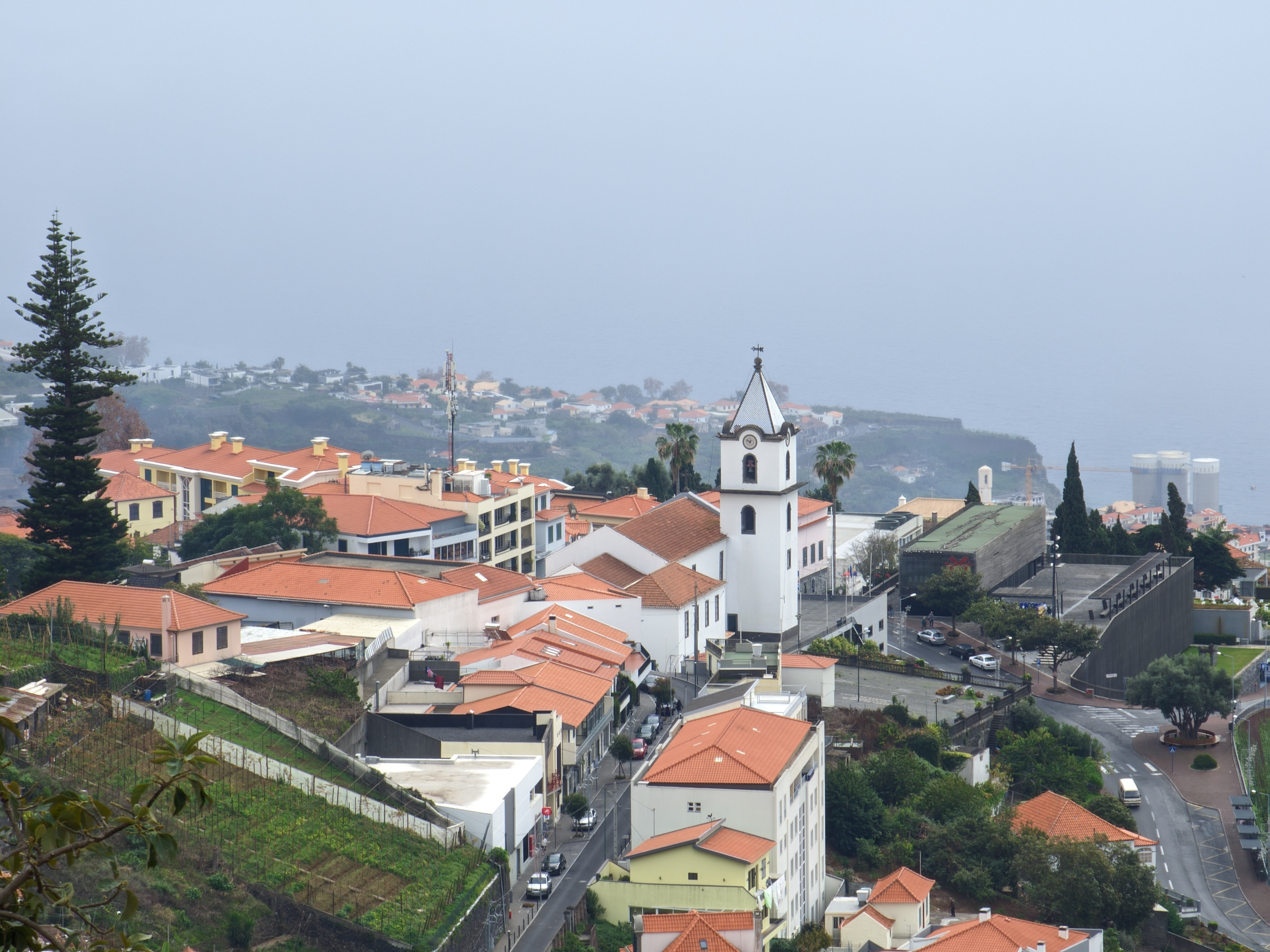
Centre of Estreito de Câmara de Lobos

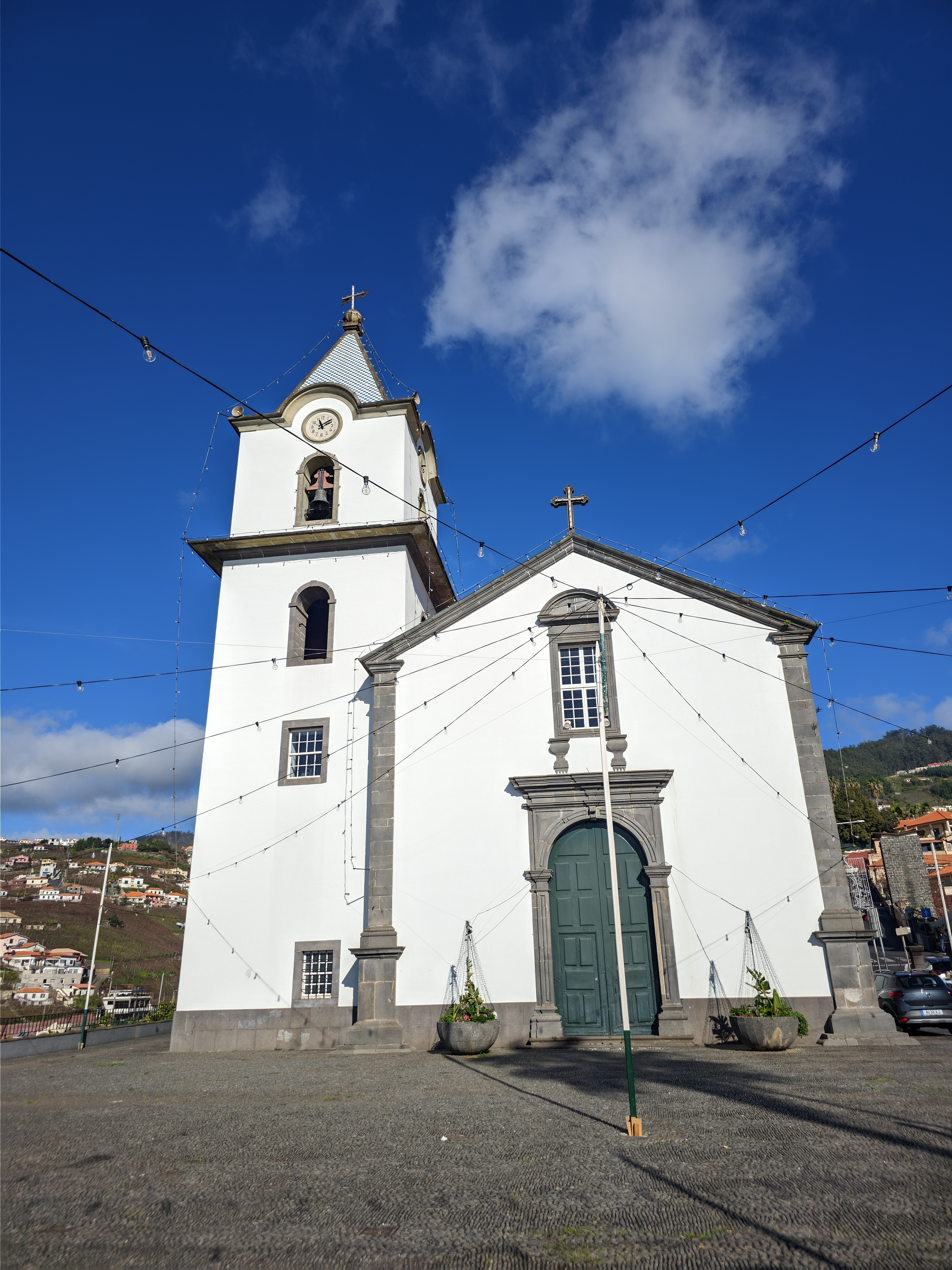
Nossa Senhora da Graça Church

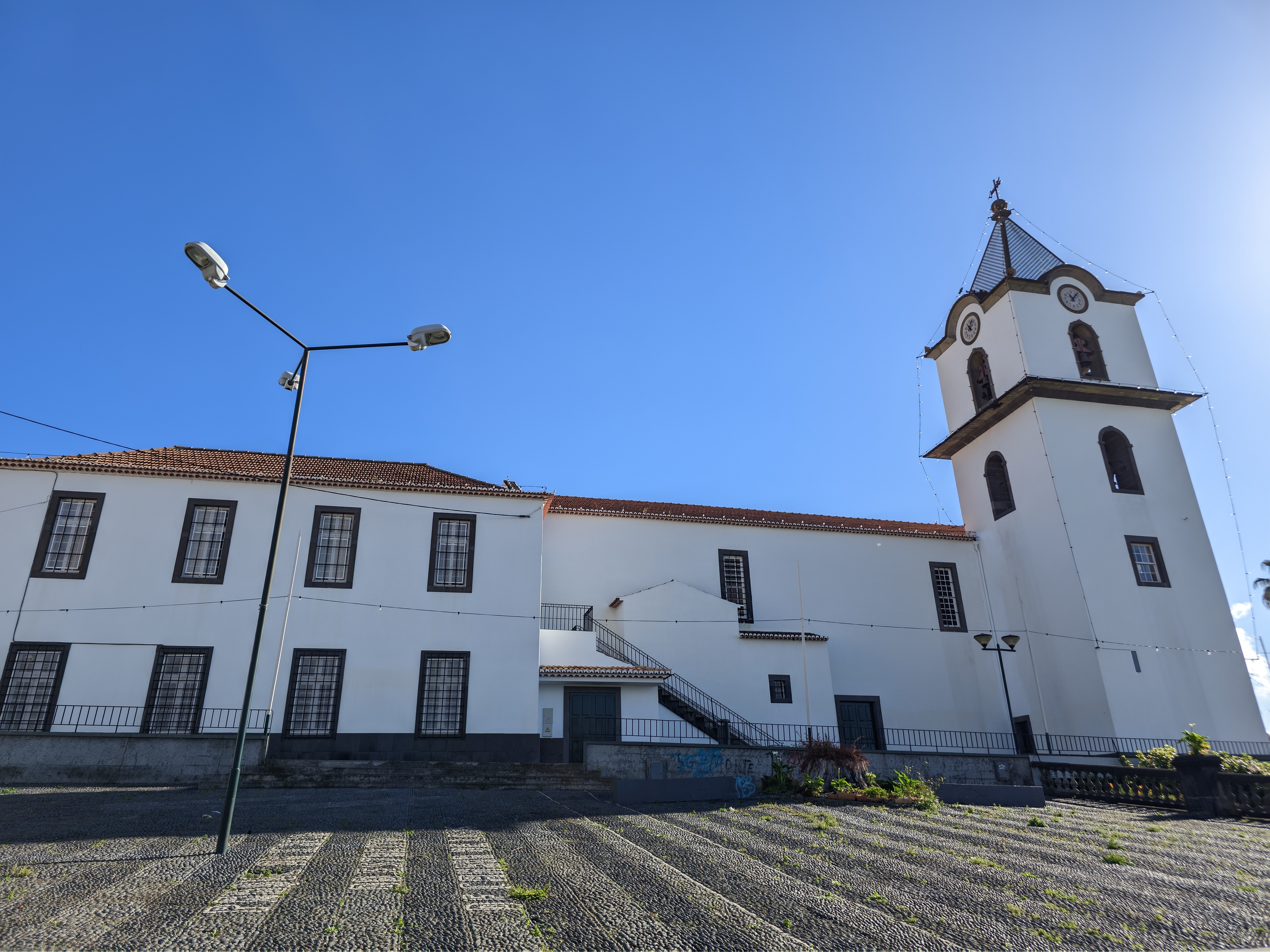
Nossa Senhora da Graça Church

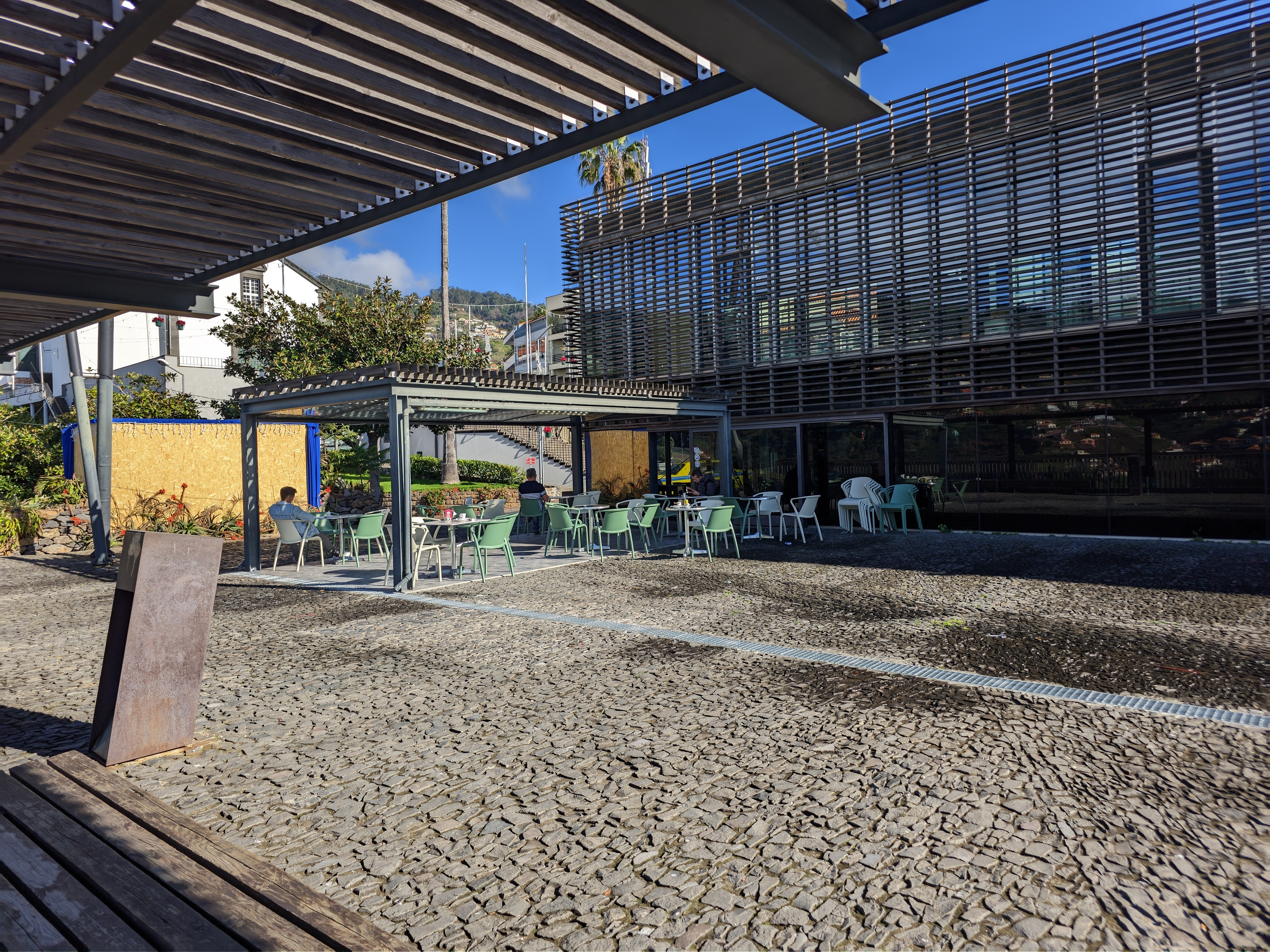
Centro Cívico

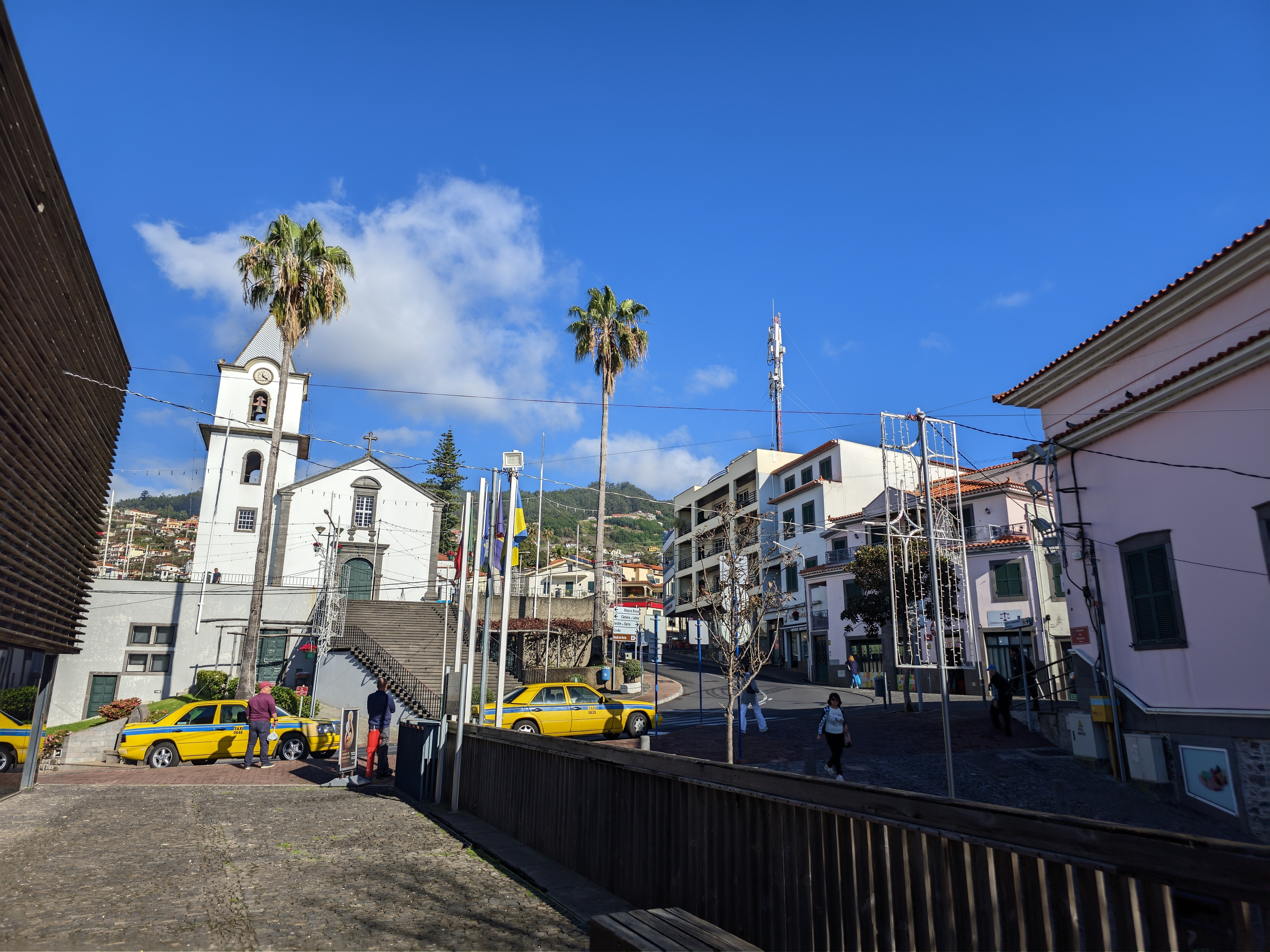
Church viewed from Centro Cívico

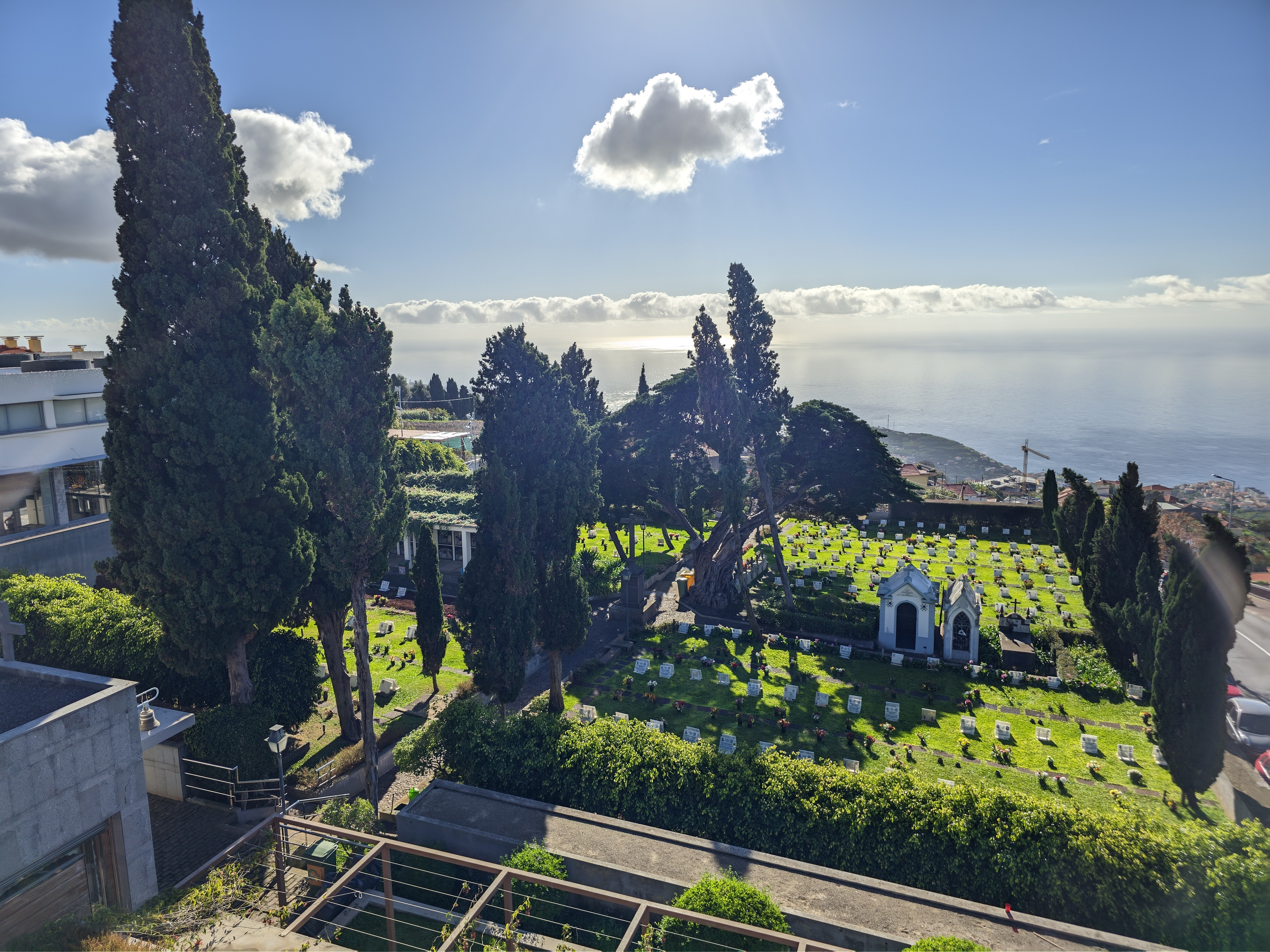
Cemetery

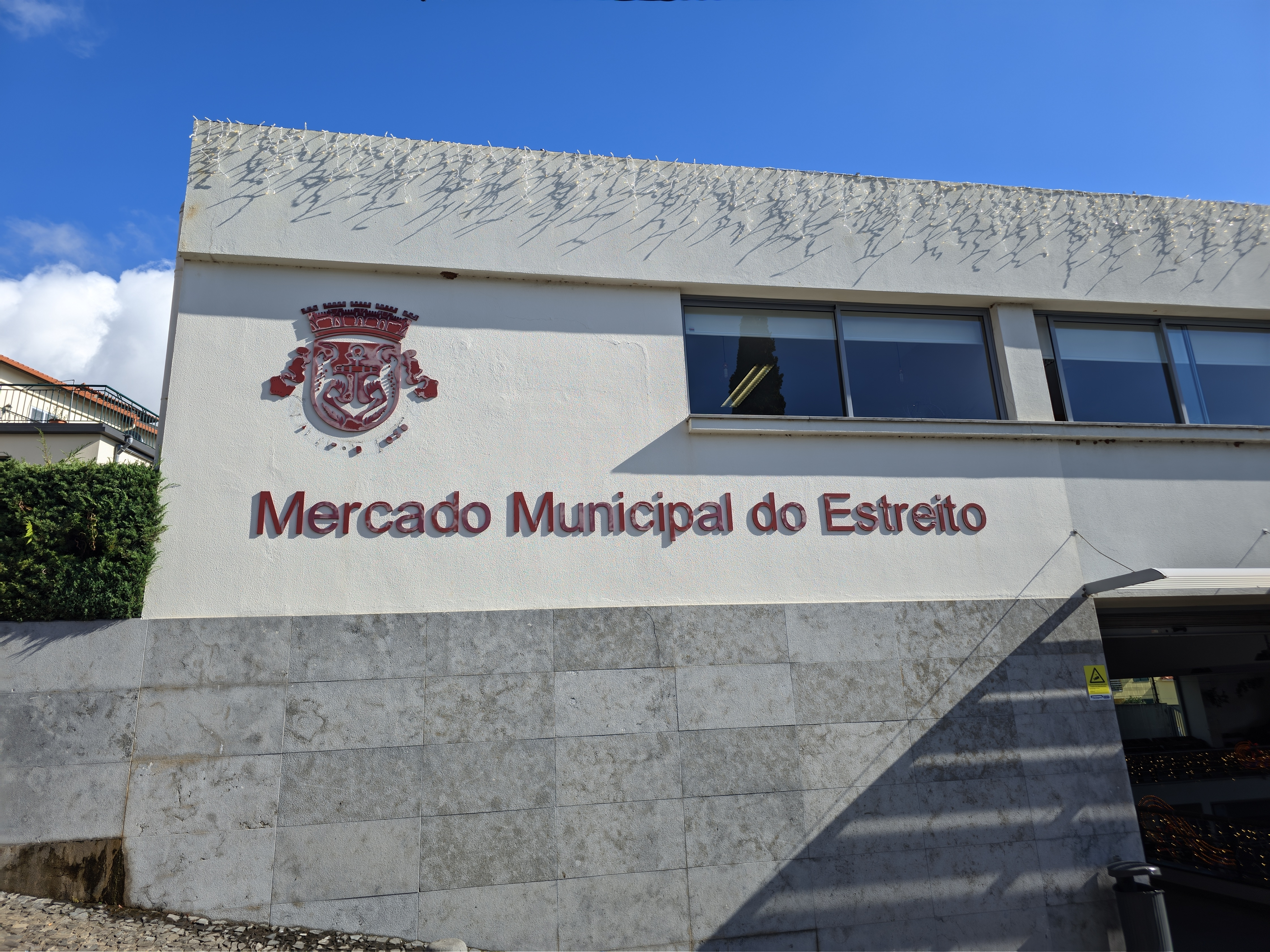
Local municipal market

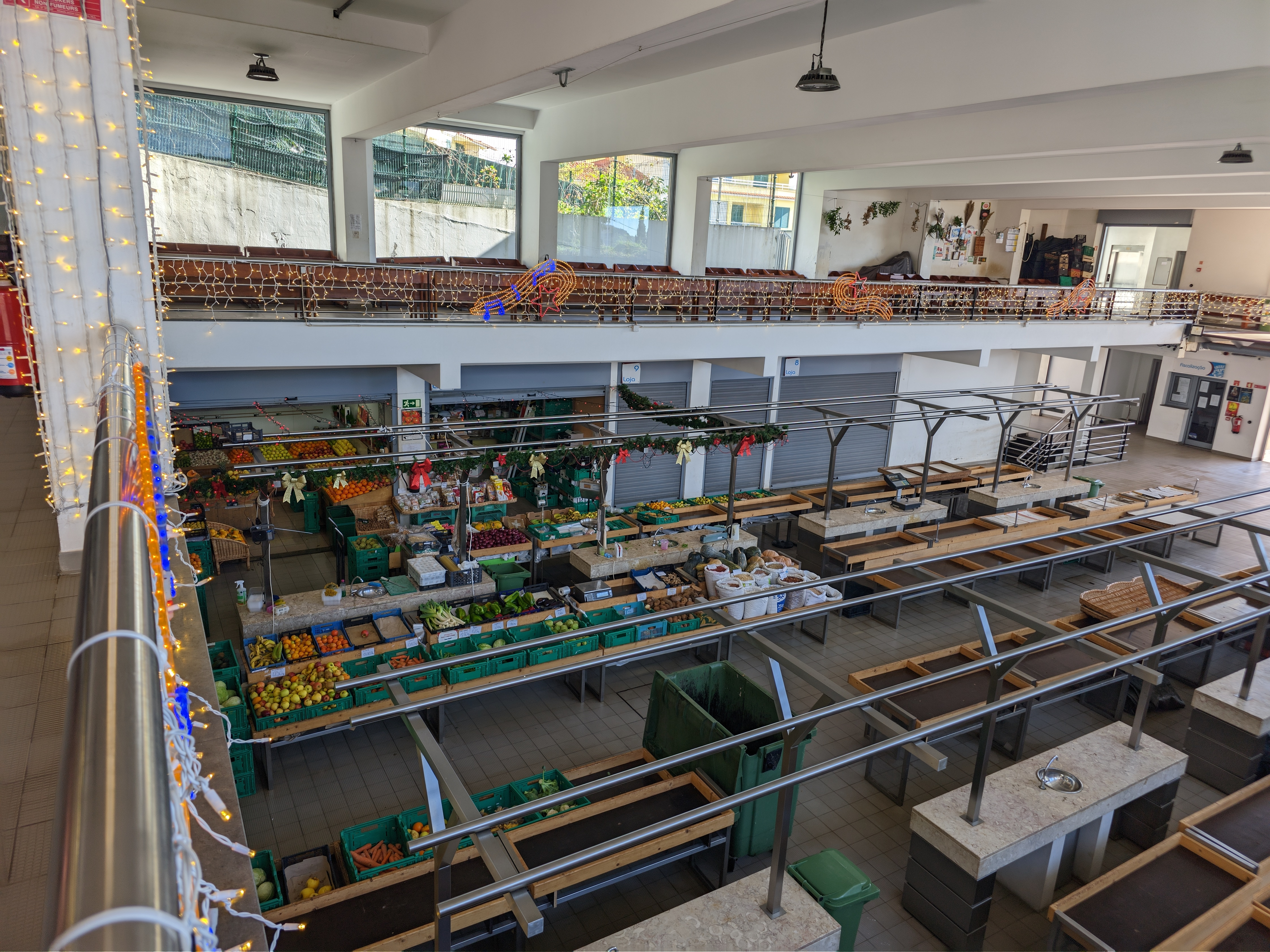
Market on a weekday

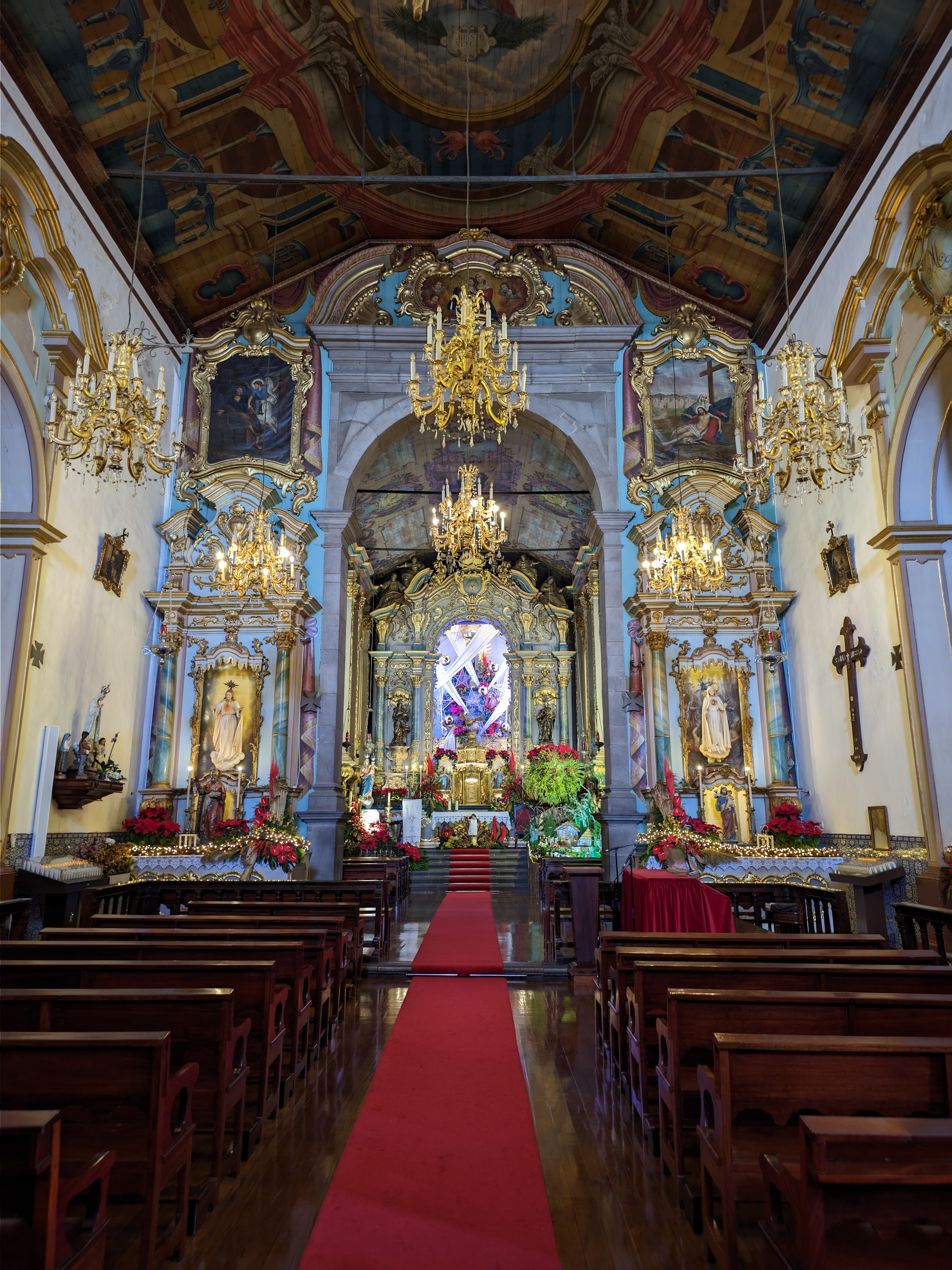
Interior of Nossa Senhora da Graça Church

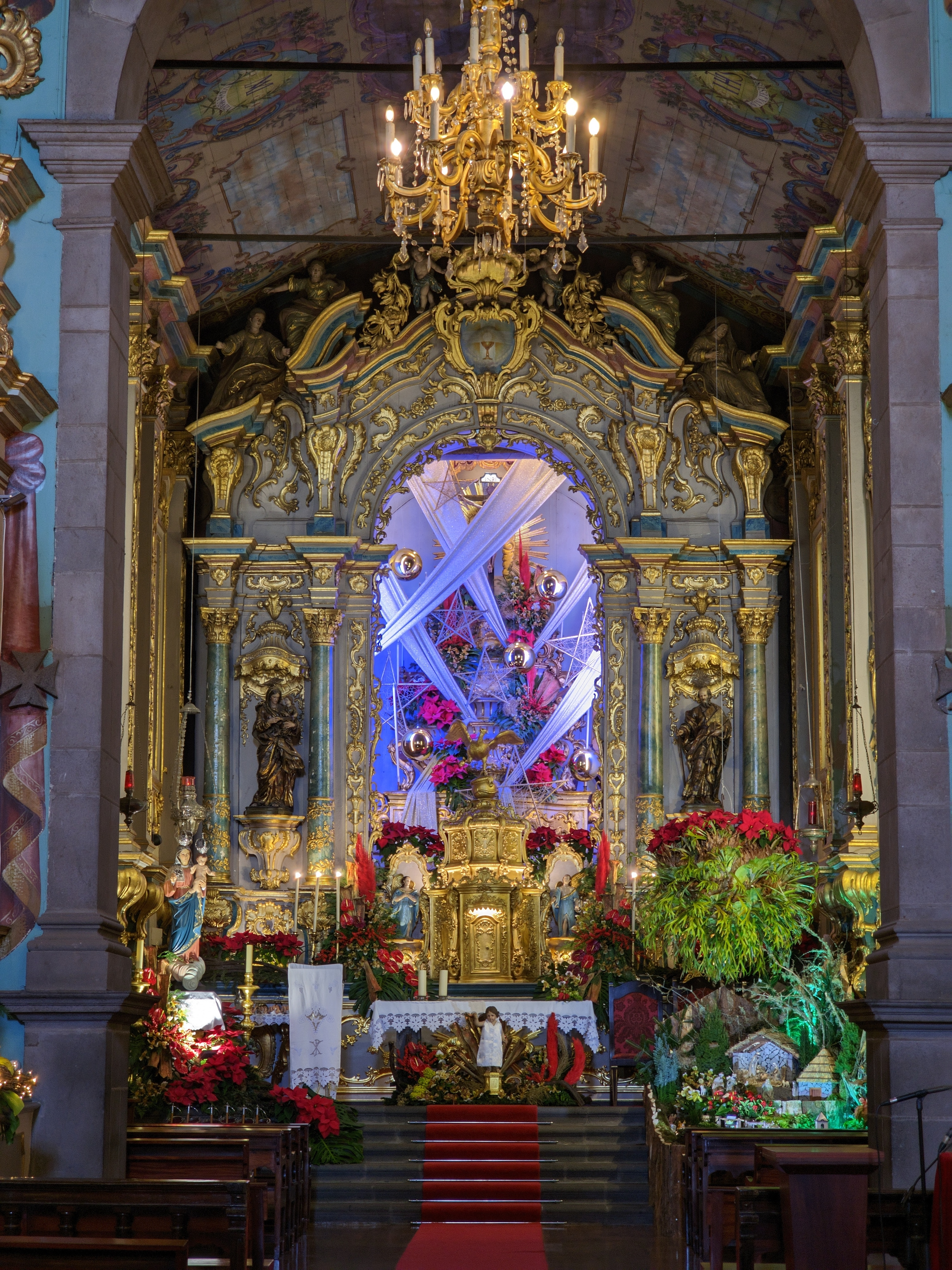
Altar of Nossa Senhora da Graça's Church

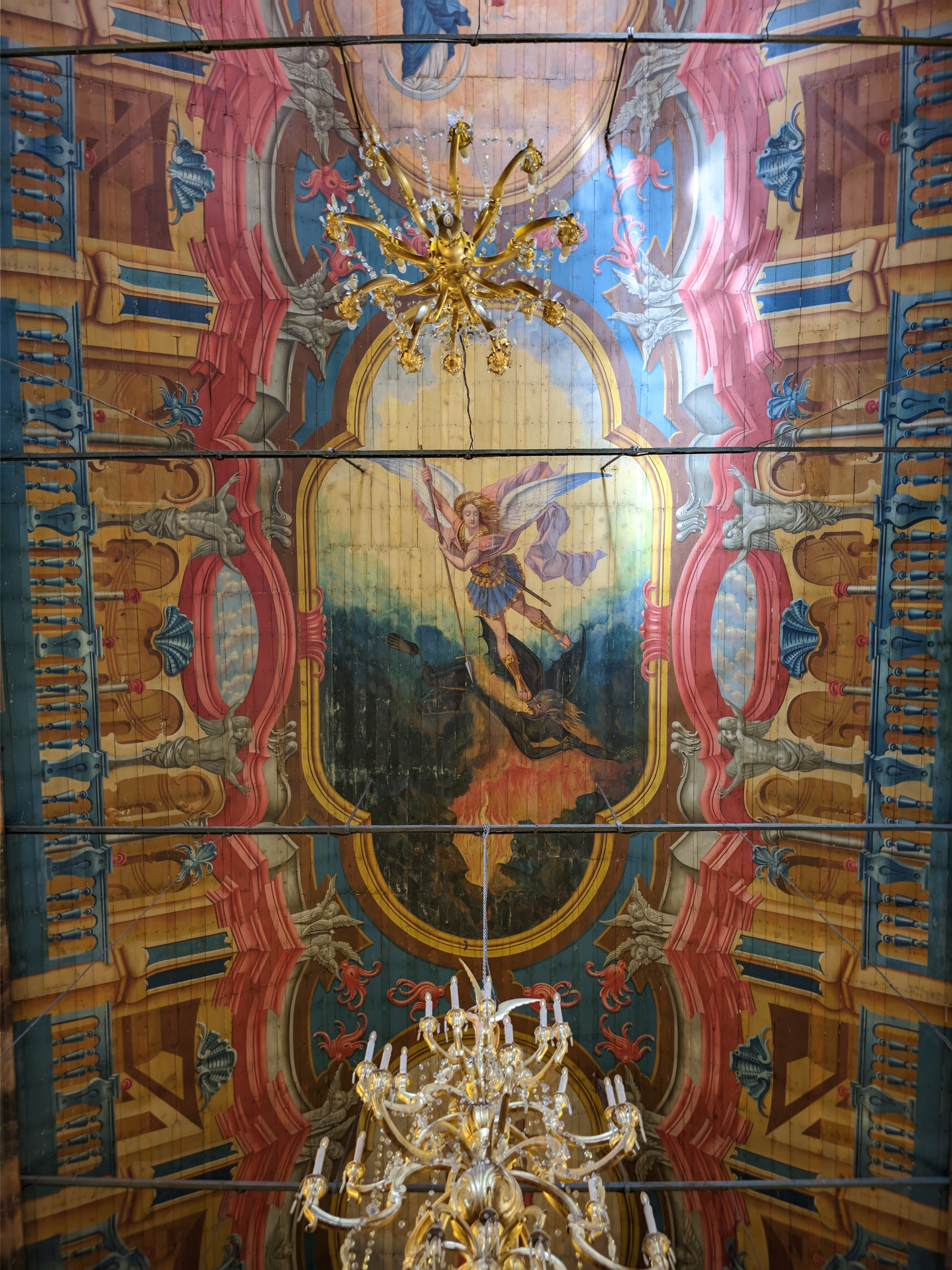
Ceiling of Nossa Senhora da Graça's Church

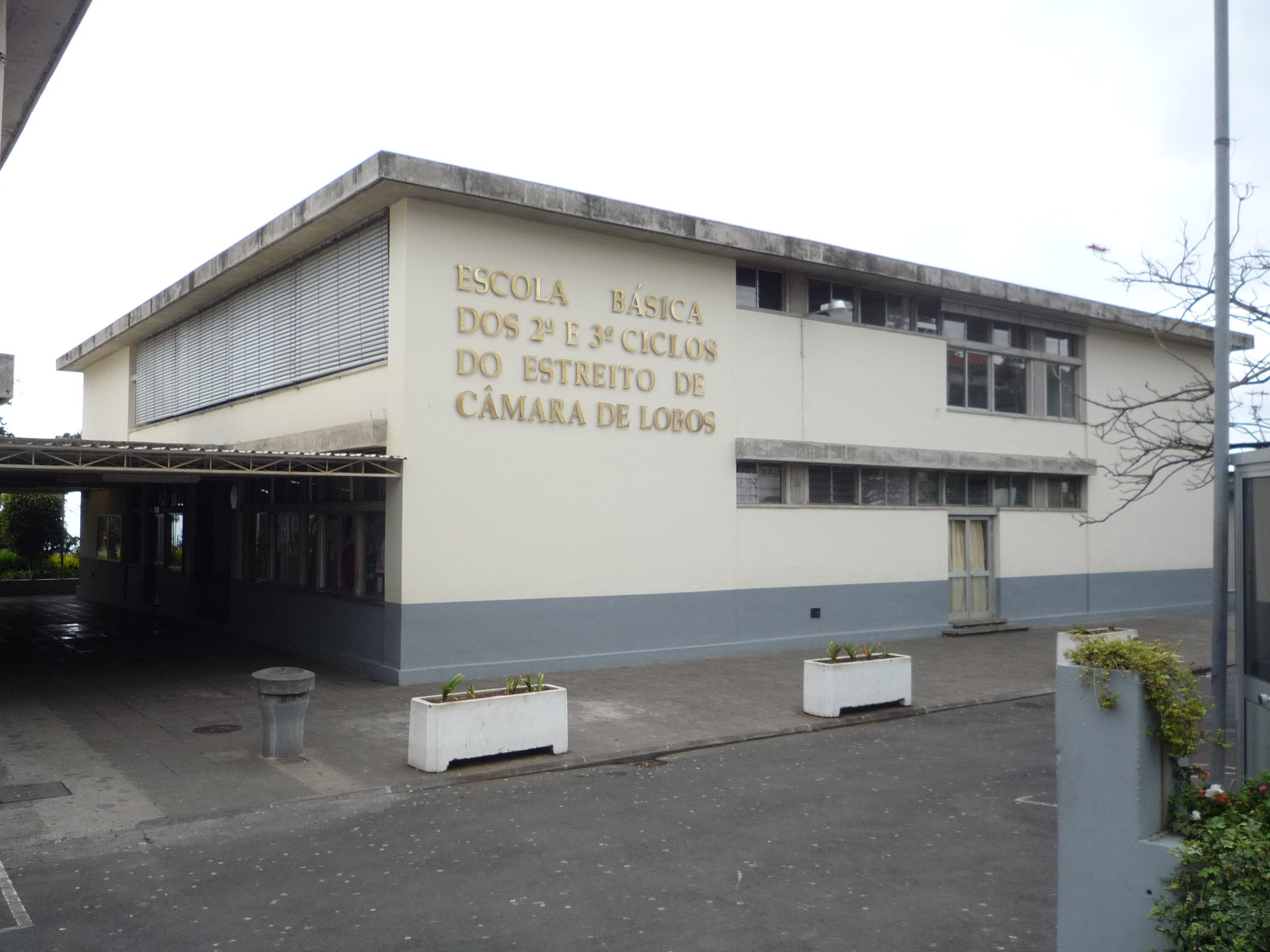
Secondary school

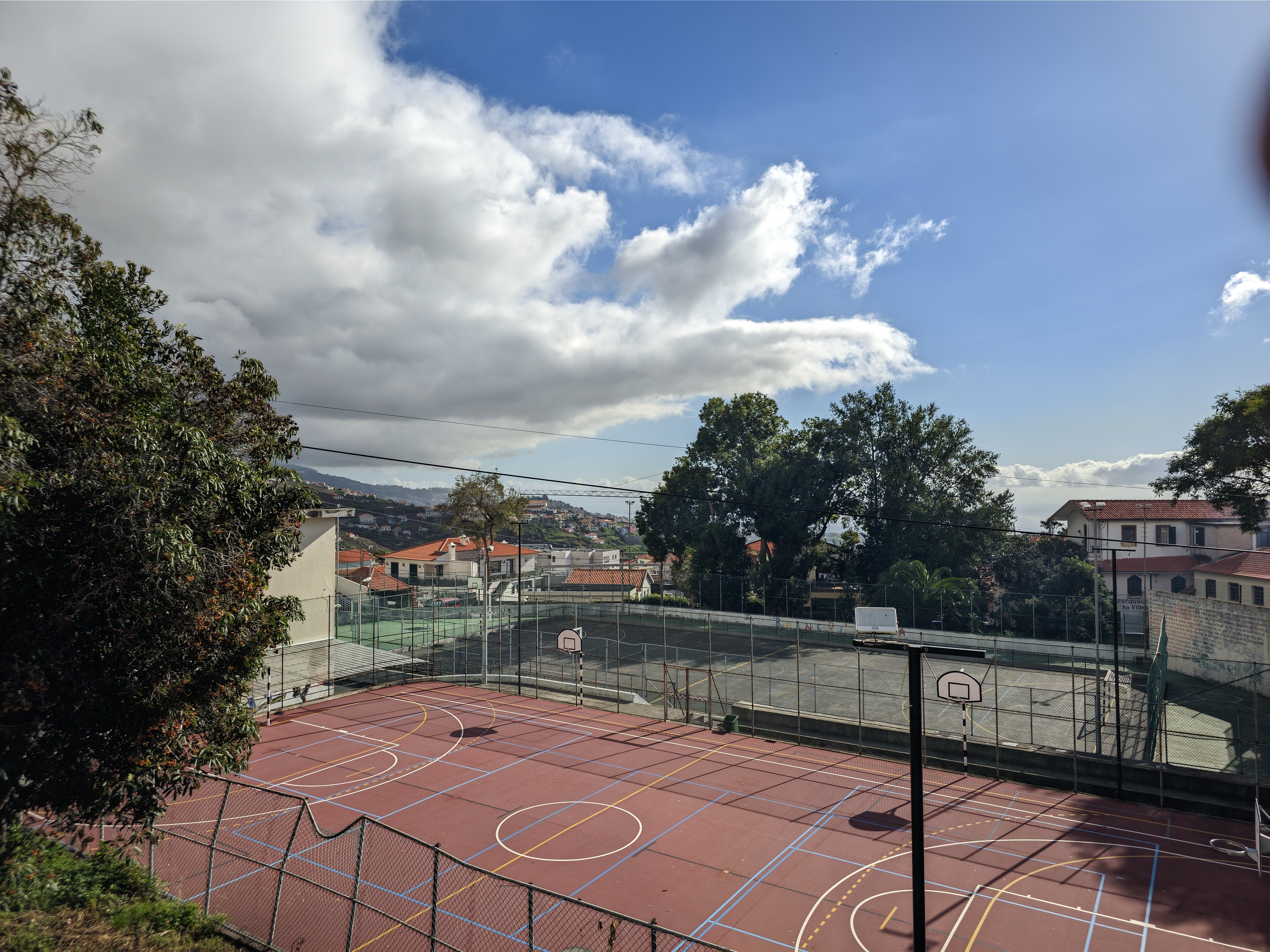
Secondary school's football and basketball pitches

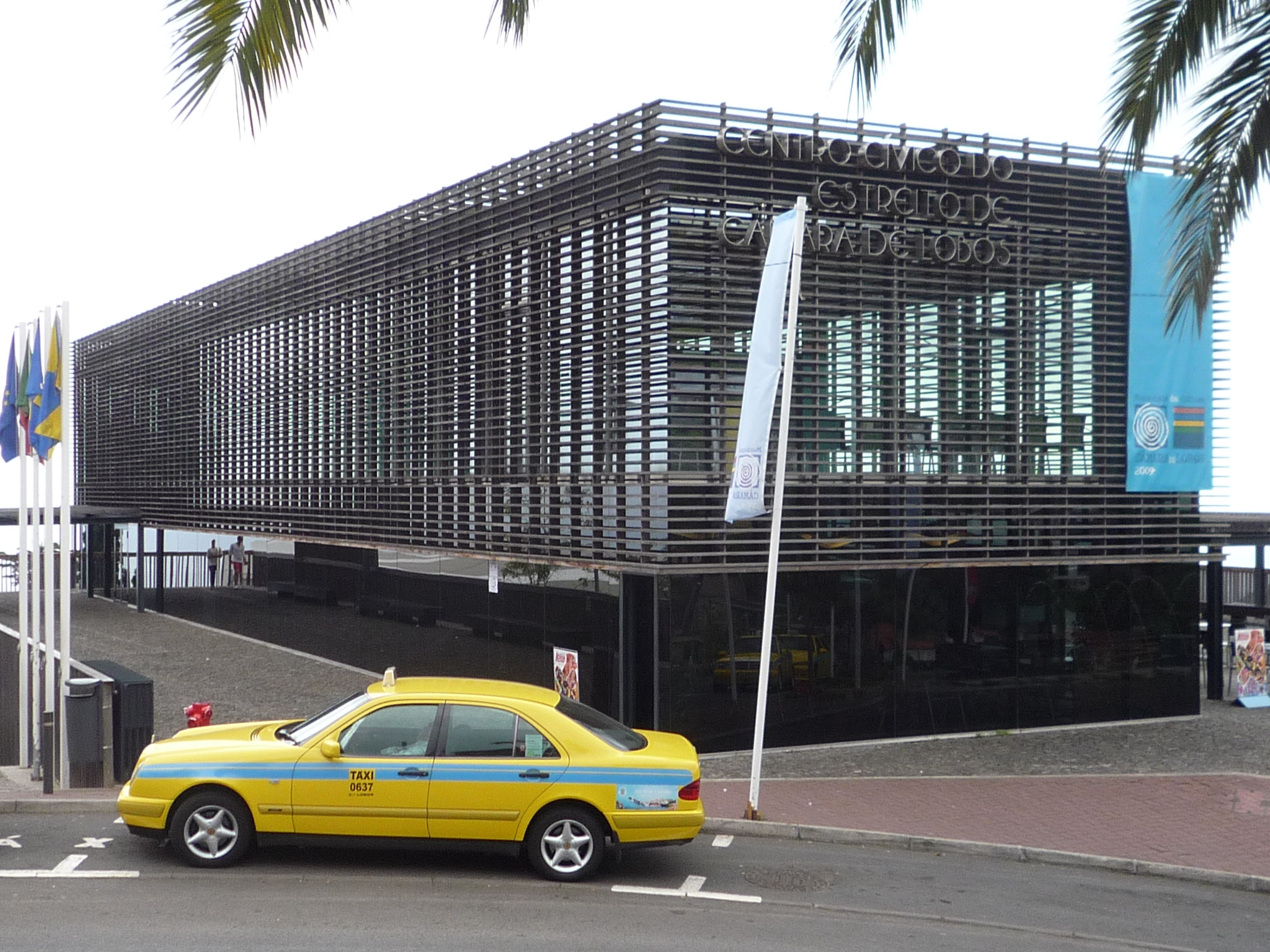
Centro Cívico and taxi stand
