= Quinta Grande =

- Civil parish
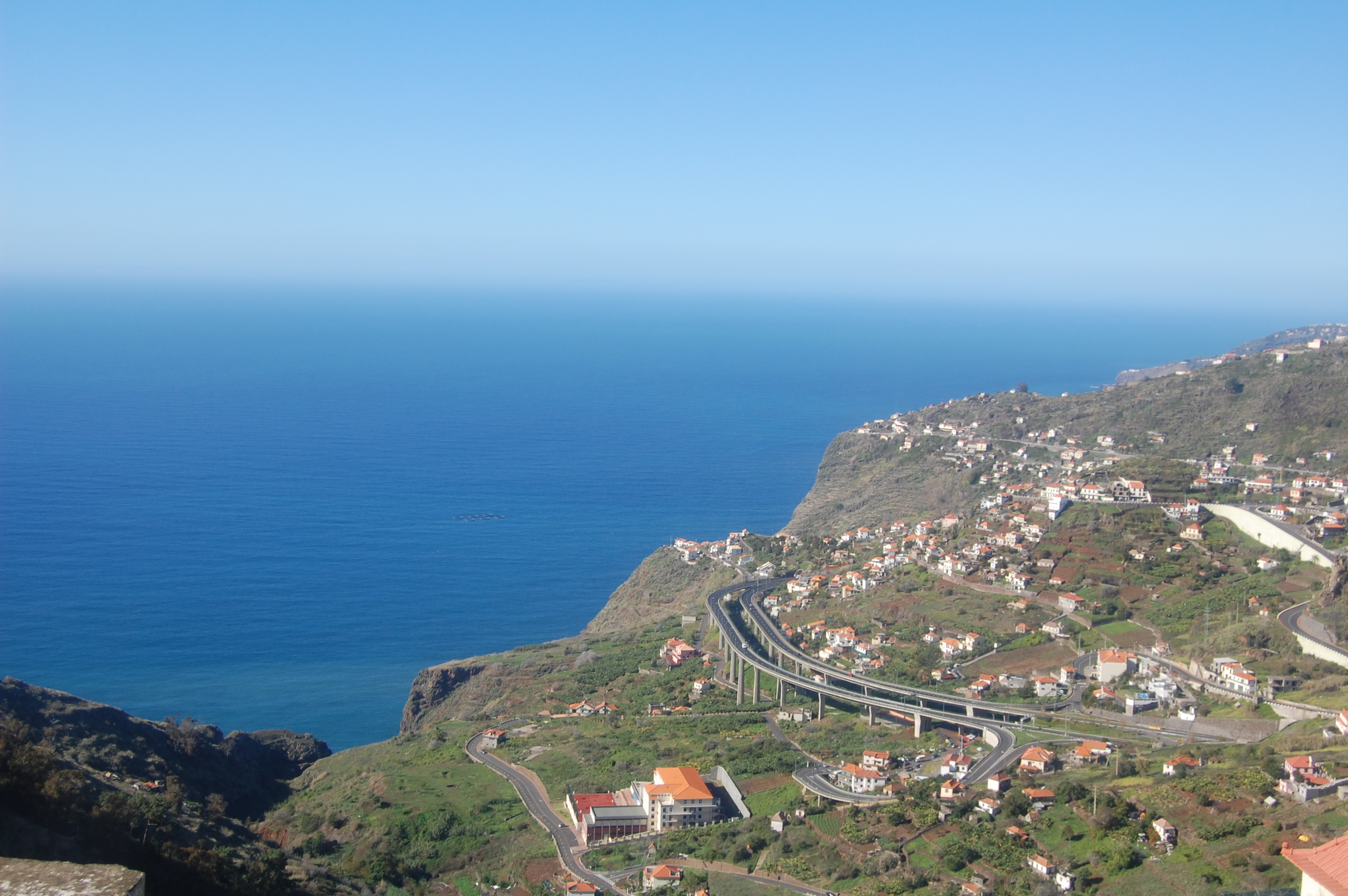
- The main settlement of Quinta Grande showing the modern expressway passing through the escarpments

- Location in Madeira
- Coordinates: 32°39′56″N 17°0′35″W
- Country: Portugal
- Auton. region: Madeira
- Island: Madeira
- Municipality: Câmara de Lobos
- Established: Settlement: fl. 1835; Parish: 24 July 1848

Area
  - Total: 4.14 km^{2} (1.60 sq mi)
- Elevation: 618 m (2,028 ft)

Population (2011)
  - Total: 2,156
  - Density: 521/km^{2} (1,350/sq mi)
- Time zone: UTC+00:00 (WET)
  - Summer (DST): UTC+01:00 (WEST)
- Postal code: 9300-261
- Area code: 291
- Patron: Nossa Senhora dos Remédios

Quinta Grande, created on 24 July 1848, is one of the five civil parishes that constitute the municipality of Câmara de Lobos in the archipelago of Madeira, Portugal. The population as of 2011 was 2,099, in an area of 4.14 square kilometres (1.60 sq mi). The community is primarily oriented around agriculture, although it has become an important tourist stop in Madeira, due to the Cabo Girão, which is considered the highest promontory in Europe at 580 metres (1,900 ft).

== Geography ==
Quinta Grande is situated within a river-valley and buttressed between the parishes of Campanário and Câmara de Lobos in the southwest coast of the island. The southeast part of the parish (along the coast) comprises Cabo Girão, a high escarpment and sheer cliff face. The residential and commercial buildings of this parish are located primarily along the river course, and, with forest, natural vegetation and terraced fields occupying the interior of the parish. The western part of the parish, although occupied by homes is a forested ridge and the eastern ridge is occupied by communication towers, radio and television facilities. Some vineyards and farmlands surround the parish to the north and east, and mostly concentrate on the cultivation of grapes for the production of Madeira Wine.
