= João Gomes Bridge =

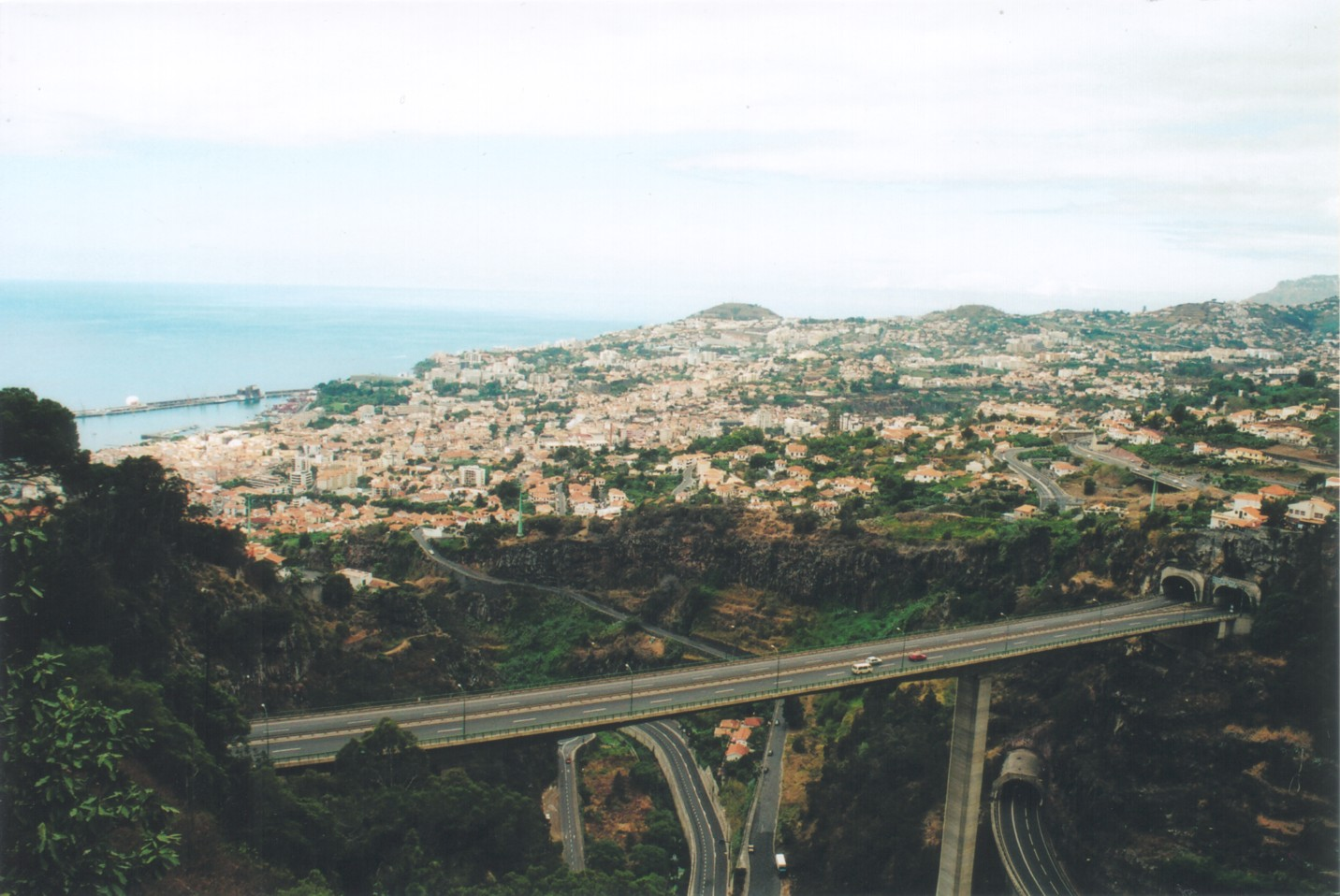
- Coordinates: 32.663°N 16.898°W
- Carries: VR1, Madeira
- Crosses: Ribeira de João Gomes
- Locale: Funchal, Madeira

Characteristics
- Total length: 274.5 metres (901 ft)
- Height: 140 metres (460 ft)

History
- Designer: António José Luís dos Reis
- Construction end: 1994

Statistics
- Daily traffic: Vehicles only

João Gomes Bridge (Portuguese: Ponte João Gomes) is a bridge in Funchal, the capital city of the Portuguese island of Madeira. It forms part of the VR1, Madeira.

It was completed in 1994 and was designed by engineer António José Luís dos Reis. It is 274.5 metres long and stands high at 140 metres.

== See also ==
- List of bridges in Portugal
