= Cabo Girão =

Sea cliff on the coast of the island of Madeira

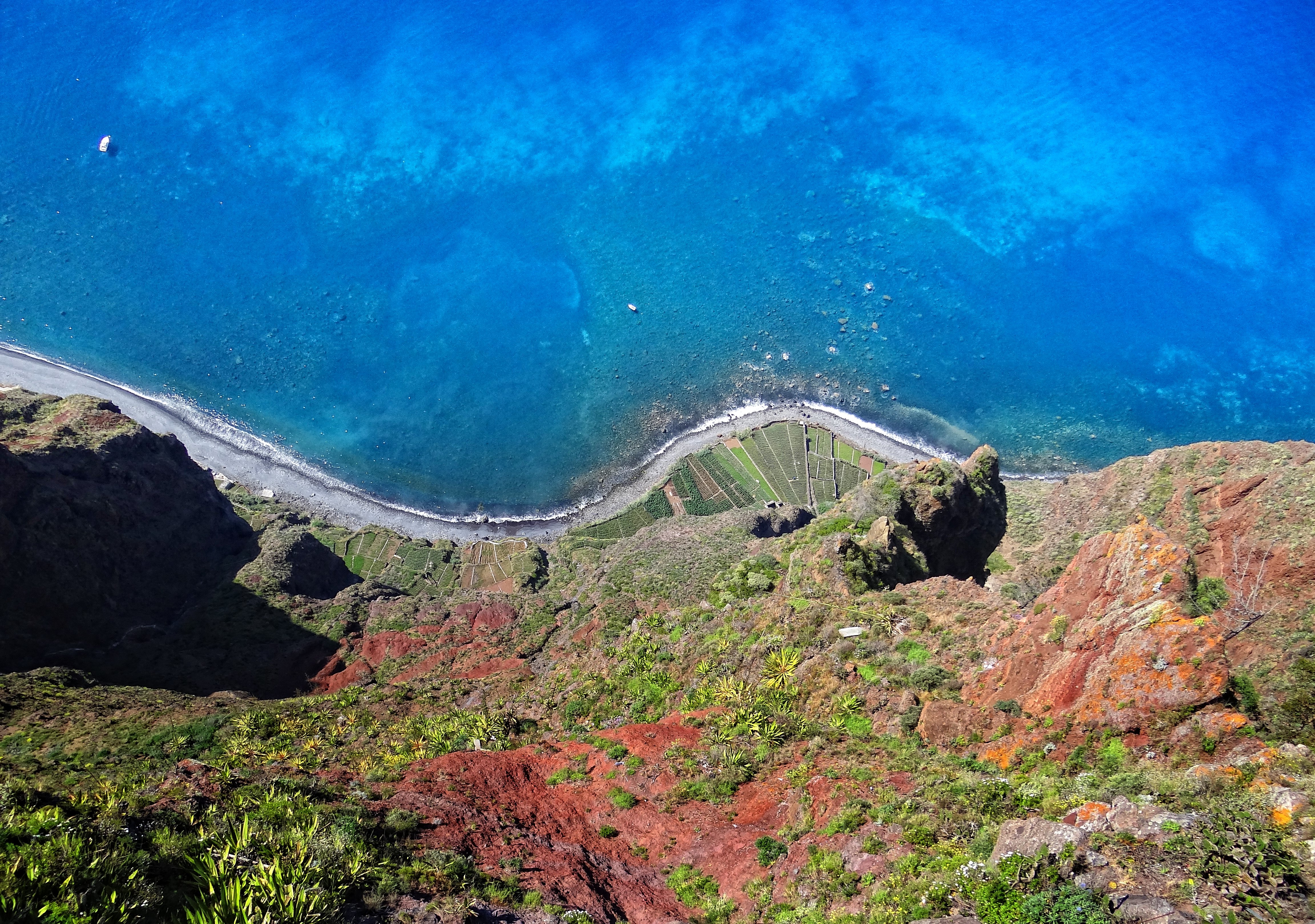
- The cliff face of Cabo Girão as seen straight down from viewpoint

Highest point
- Elevation: 580 m (1,900 ft)
- Coordinates: 32°39′23″N 17°0′24″W

Naming
- Etymology: cabo girão, Portuguese compound phrase for cape of cultivation

Geography
- Location within Madeira
- Country: Portugal
- Autonomous Region: Madeira
- Civil Parish: Câmara de Lobos; Quinta Grande
- Municipality: Câmara de Lobos

Geology
- Orogeny: Volcanism
- Rock age: Miocene

Cabo Girão (European Portuguese pronunciation: [ˈkaβu ʒiˈɾɐ̃w]) is a lofty sea cliff located along the southern coast of the island of Madeira, in the Portuguese archipelago of Madeira, geographically part of Africa. Cabo Girão is a tourist lookout point, with up to 1800 visitors a day. The location is also a common starting point for hikers.

== Skywalk ==
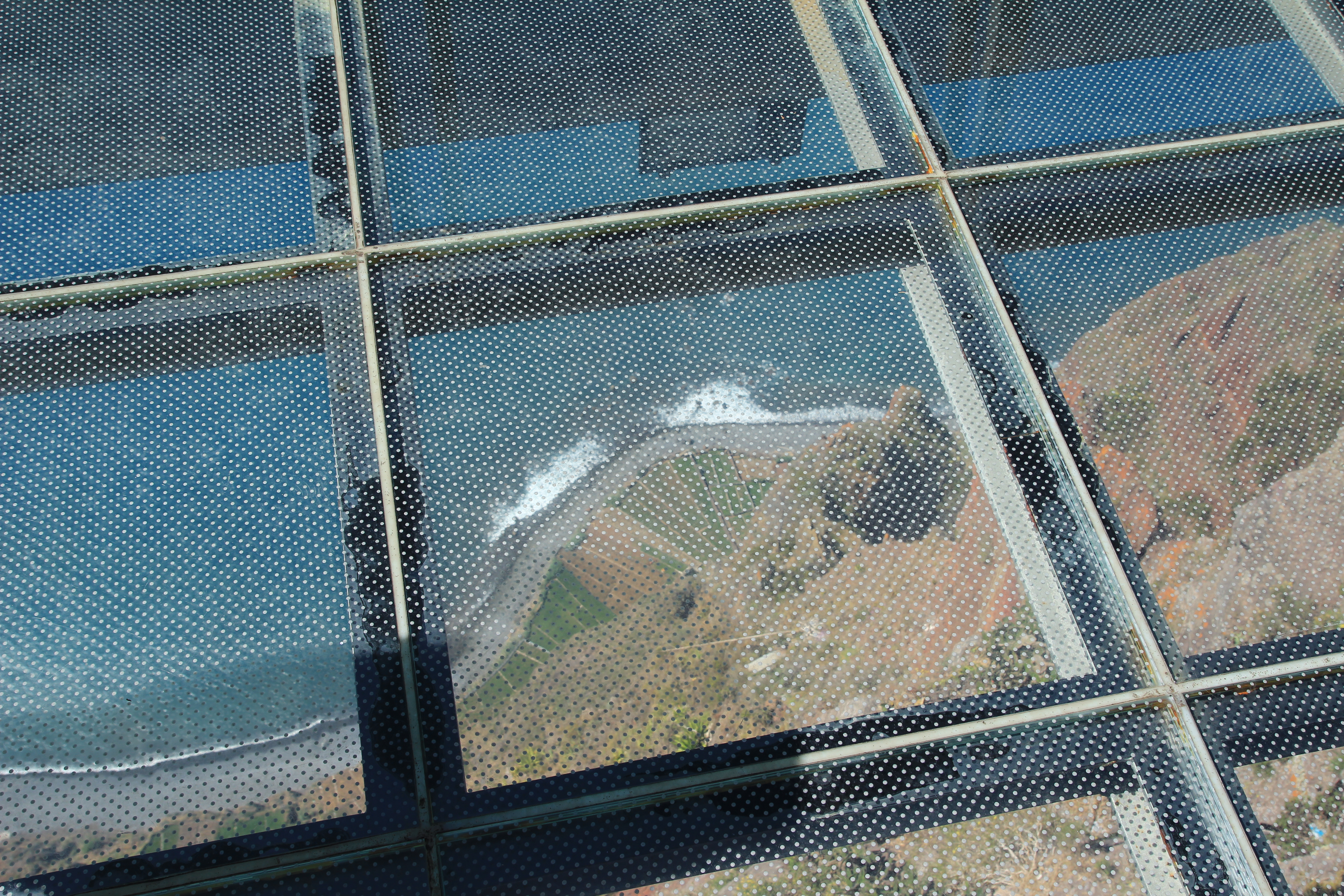
Looking down through the skywalk

The Cabo Girão Skywalk is the highest cliff skywalk in Europe, located on top of the cabo Girão Cliff in Madeira Island. The skywalk opened in late October 2012 and is similar to the Grand Canyon Skywalk—both are made of transparent glass to provide views to visitors.

== Geography ==
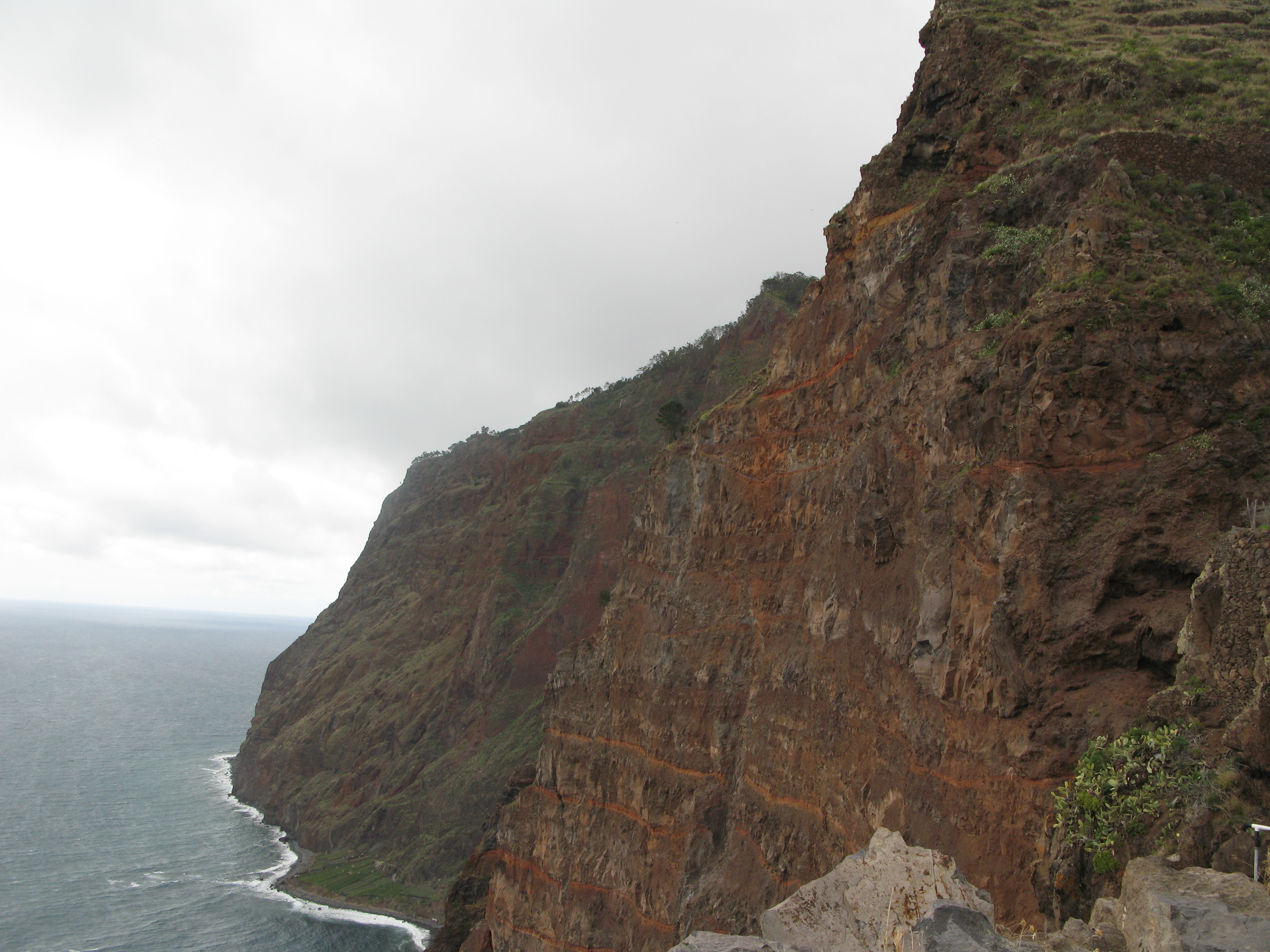
The cliff face of Cabo Girão

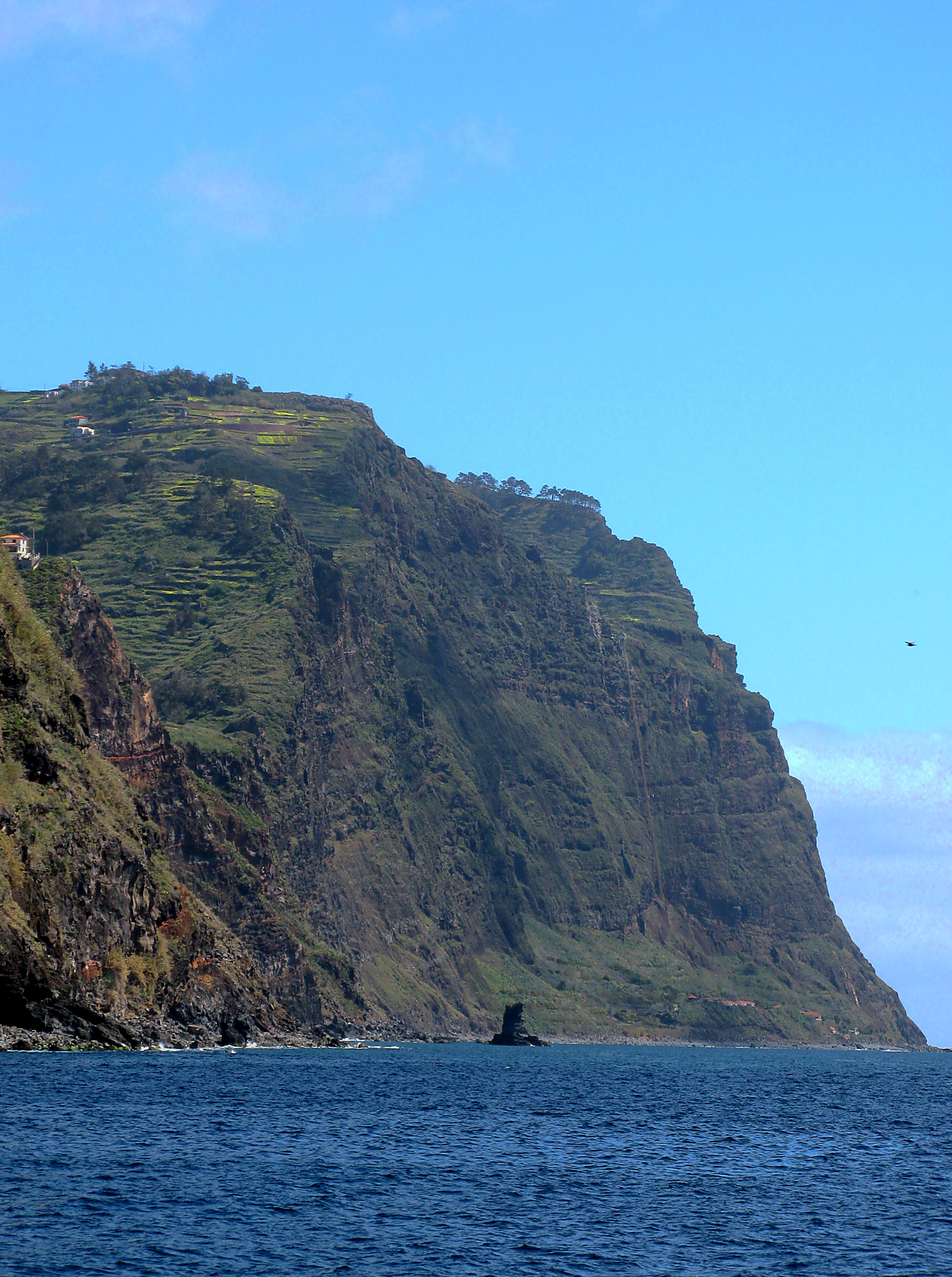
The sheer cliff face of Cabo Girão

It is situated less than two kilometres west from the centre of Câmara de Lobos, between the parishes of Quinta Grande and Câmara de Lobos. A diamond-shaped sea-cliff escarpment from 560 metres (1,840 ft) to 589 metres (1,932 ft) above sea level, Cabo Girão lies between two river valleys that flow into the Atlantic Ocean. The escarpment and cliffs extend approximately three kilometres between the urban sprawl of Câmara de Lobos to the east and the river valley of Quinta Grande in the west.

There are cultivated wave-cut platforms (Fajãs de Cabo Girão) located below the sheer cliffs, which at one time were only accessible by boat. In August 2003, a cable car was installed on the slope of the cliff so farmers can reach these low-lying fields.

== Architecture ==
Apart from the communications towers that are installed on Cabo Girão, the Cape is noted for the Chapel of Nossa Senhora da Fátima (English: Our Lady of Fátima), which was built in 1974 to replace a much smaller chapel built in 1931.
