= Câmara de Lobos =

- Municipality
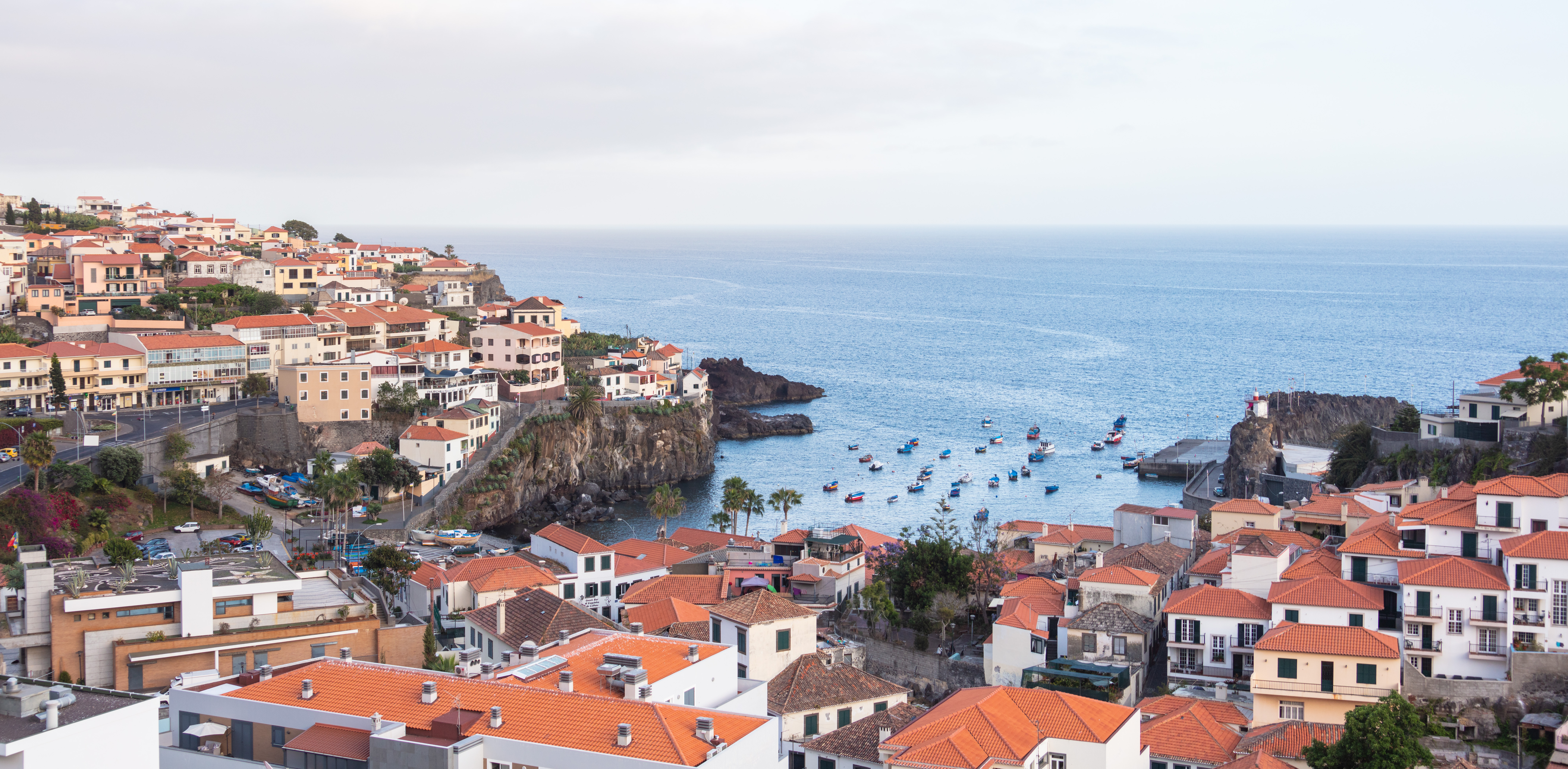
- View of the centre of Câmara de Lobos

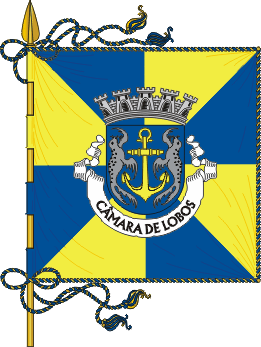
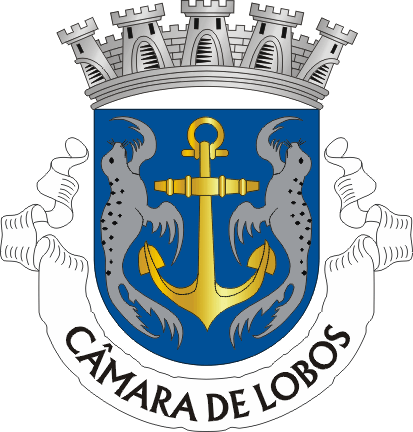
- Flag Coat of arms
- Interactive map of Câmara de Lobos
- Location in Madeira
- Coordinates: 32°41′43″N 16°58′41″W
- Country: Portugal
- Auton. region: Madeira
- Island: Madeira
- Established: Settlement: c. 1419; Municipality: 4 October 1835; Town: 3 August 1996
- Parishes: 5

Government
  - President: Pedro Coelho

Area
  - Total: 52.14 km^{2} (20.13 sq mi)
- Elevation: 1,044 m (3,425 ft)

Population (2011)
  - Total: 35,666
  - Density: 684.0/km^{2} (1,772/sq mi)
- Time zone: UTC+00:00 (WET)
  - Summer (DST): UTC+01:00 (WEST)
- Postal code: 9304-001
- Area code: 291
- Patron: São Sebastião
- Local holiday: 04 October
- Website: www.cm-camaradelobos.pt

Panoramic view of the municipality

Câmara de Lobos (European Portuguese pronunciation: [ˈkɐmɐɾɐ ðɨ ˈloβuʃ]; lit. 'Chamber of Wolves' or 'Wolves' Chamber') is a municipality and town in the southern coast of the Portuguese island of Madeira, divided in 5 freguesias. A de facto suburb of the much larger capital city of Funchal, it is one of the larger population centres and an extension of the Funchal economy.

== History ==
The location of the modern town is believed to be the original landing point for the Portuguese discoverer João Gonçalves Zarco, who is credited with the discovery of the Madeira Islands. When the explorer disembarked in this area (1419), he observed a narrow rocky peninsula that extended into the ocean, and another nearby that formed an amphitheatre-like harbour that could shelter ships from Atlantic storms. There, Zarco and his men also found a large colony of marine animals that would become the reason for naming this area Câmara de Lobos.

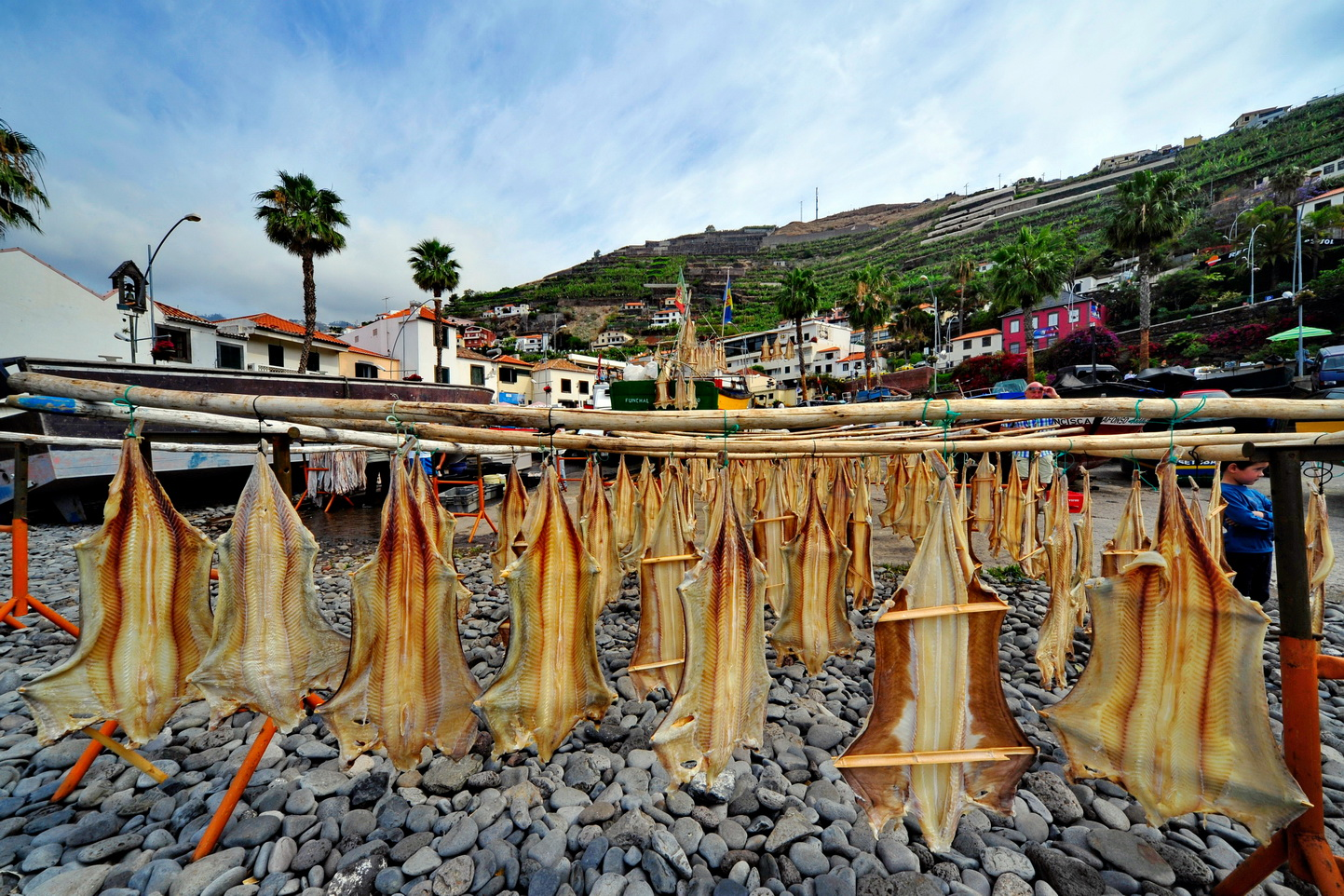
Port with dry fish

The name lobos is a Portuguese derivation for "seals" (Portuguese: lobos-marinhos), which were the animals discovered by Zarco and his men in the sheltered bay. Because of the large colony of these animals, the area was christened câmara dos lobos. This was a pejorative term, since câmara is the Portuguese word for "municipal chamber" (sometimes erroneously referred to as the "town hall" or "town council"), and the sailors literally named the area the "Municipal chamber of [the place where there are] sea-wolves". Today, the species of monk seals are rare, being an animal common to the Mediterranean, but today confined to a small colony on the Desertas Islands.

The municipality was created by ministerial decree on 25 May 1835, and invested its executive on 4 October 1835. Initially, this administrative division included the parishes of Câmara de Lobos, Curral das Freiras, Estreito de Câmara de Lobos and Campanário, all districts of Funchal. With many alterations, the newly constituted municipality of Câmara de Lobos operated with those parishes as its core, until Quinta Grande was constituted from sites in the parishes of Campanário and Câmara de Lobos, but maintaining its total area. On 6 May 1914, Campanário is deannexed to the newly created municipality of Ribeira Brava, and on 5 July 1996, the parish of Jardim da Serra was constituted from the higher localities of Estreito de Câmara de Lobos.

On 15 September 1994, the parish of Estreito de Câmara de Lobos was elevated to the status of town, while two years later, on 3 August 1996, the village of Câmara de Lobos attained the status of town.

== Geography ==
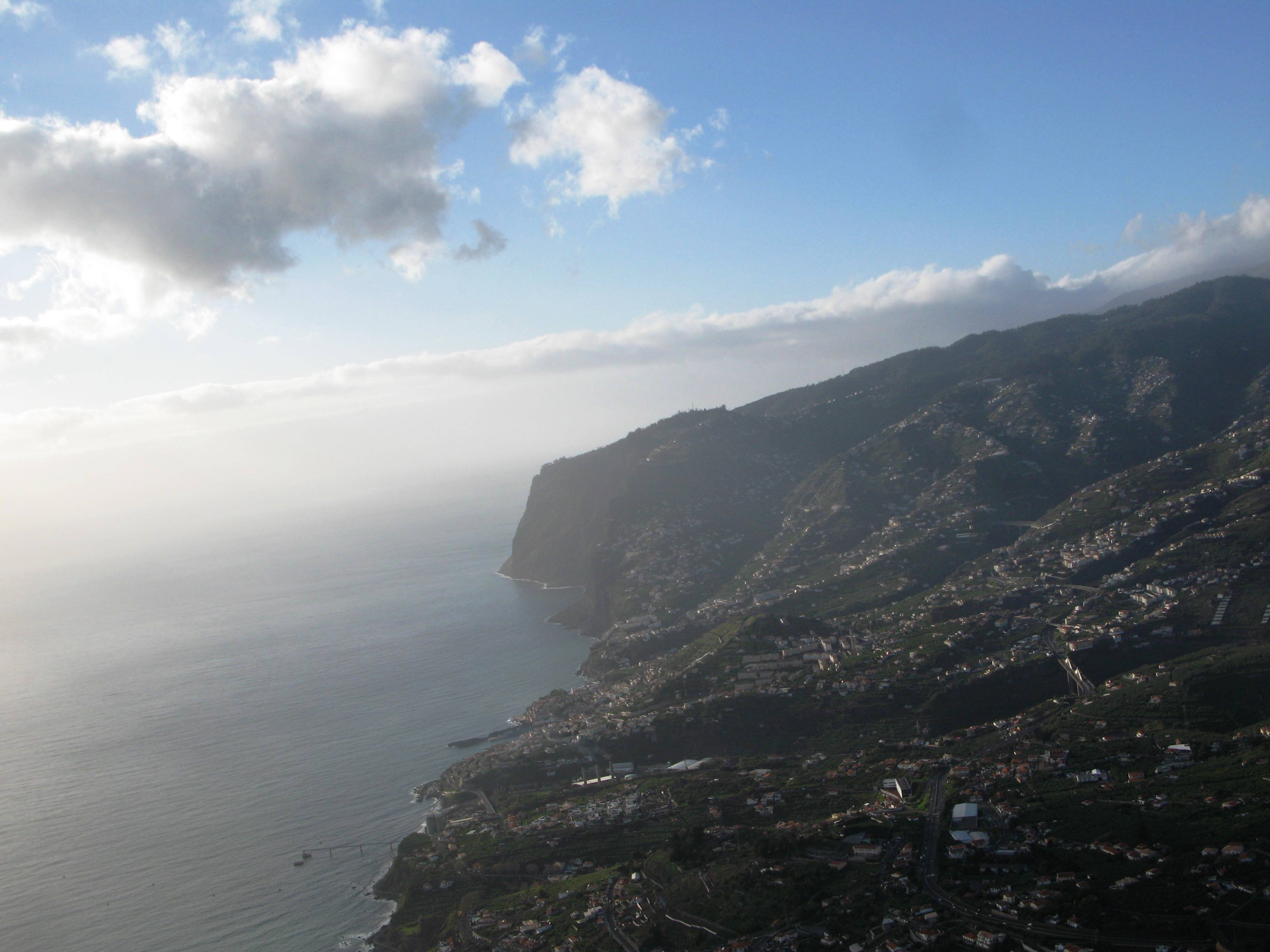
Aerial view of the built-up areas of Câmara de Lobos along the coast, with the steep cliffs of Cabo Girão in the distance

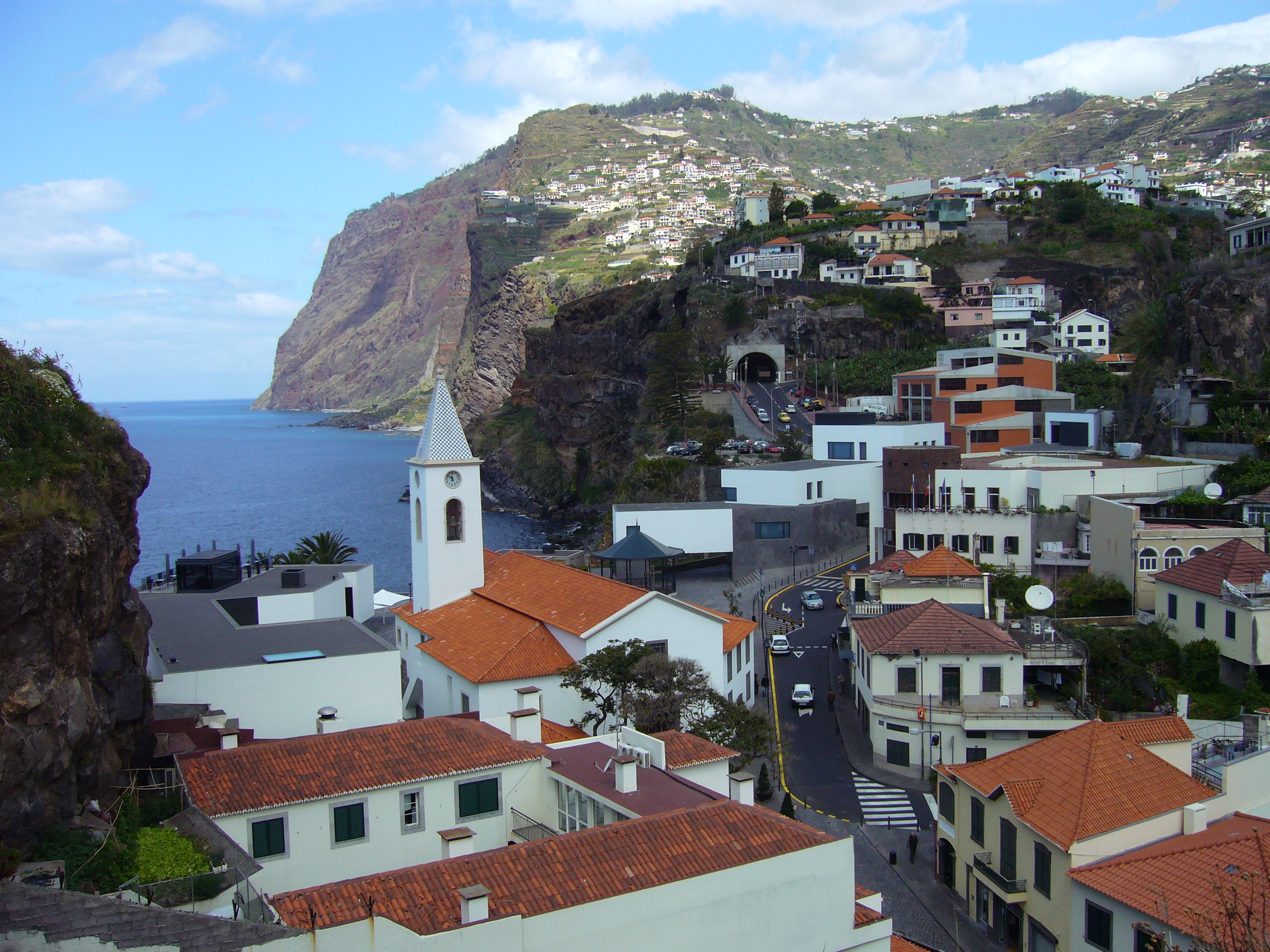
The main settlement of Câmara de Lobos, and first area settled by colonists to this area

Câmara de Lobos is the second largest settlement by population in Madeira with the largest (45%) contribution of youth under 25 years. Located within the metropolitan zone of Funchal, it is limited to the east by Funchal (through the parish of Estreito de Câmara de Lobos); to the west by the municipality of Ribeira Brava and the steep cliffs of Cabo Girão (one of the highest cliffs in Europe: 580 meter elevation); and north by the municipalities of Santana and São Vicente (and the mountains of Pico de Arieiro); while fronting the Atlantic Ocean to the south (except an area in the southwest near Quinta Grande (Fajã dos Padres) whose coast is part of the neighbouring parish of Campanário in Ribeira Brava

The decree of 1955 (No.40.221/5 July 1955) defines these limits more explicitly. but allows for interpretations:

"In the north, from Pico do Arieiro, the municipal limit follows the line from the heights defined by Pedra Rija, Pico do Cidrão, Pico do Gato, Pico das Torres, Pico da Cágada, Pico Ruivo de Santana, Pico da Lapa da Cadela, Pico do Coelho, Pico das Eirinhas, Pico da Laje, Pico das Torrinhas, Pico Casado and Pico do Jorge. On the west, follow Pico do Jorge along a line in the altitudes specified by the Pico Arranha-Mata, Pico do Cerco, Pico Grande, Pico do Serradinho, Boca do Paço de Aires, Boca dos Corgos, Alto dos Aviceiros, Lombo do Covão, or Estrebaria, Pico do Trevo, Eira das Moças and Pico da Cruz, where they follow the road of Achada in Campanário until Vera Cruz, continuing through the escarpment of Partilha until an escarpment overlooing the sea, conforming to demarkations signed by cadastral services. To the south, the municipality is limited by the foremetioned escarpment until the mouth of the Ribeira da Quinta Grande and then by the coast line until the ravine in Socorridos, but not including the Fajã dos Padres. The east corresponds to the western limit of the municipality of Funchal, or specifically the line that exits Pico do Serrado and follows Lombo da Partilha until the confluence of the ravine of Eiroses and Socorridos, which serves as the municipalities limit until the ocean."

=== Human geography ===
Population of Câmara de Lobos (1849 - 2011)
Year	Pop.	±%
1849	12,391	—
1900	17,468	+41.0%
1930	21,806	+24.8%
1960	29,759	+36.5%
1981	31,035	+4.3%
1991	31,476	+1.4%
2001	34,614	+10.0%
2011	35,666	+3.0%

The municipality of Câmara de Lobos, in accord with the 2001 census, has a population of 30,814, while its resident population is 31,476 inhabitants (47% to 53%, male to female composition). While 22.7% are seniors (the lowest percentage in Maderia), its active population represents 10,986 of the population.

There are five parishes that constitute the municipality of Câmara de Lobos:

- Câmara de Lobos - The central urbanized area of Lobos (an area of 7.74 km^{2}) is primarily residential and commercial: the parish population is approximately 17,986 inhabitants. This core parish, is boxed in by Funchal (to the east), Quinta Grande (in the west) and Estreito de Câmara de Lobos (to the north). Many of these areas are highly development housing units, constructed during the late 20th Century, during the extensive growth in tourism and financial services on the island. Farmlands, which located in northern tracts have since given way to residential and commercial businesses.
- Curral das Freiras
- Estreito de Câmara de Lobos
- Jardim da Serra
- Quinta Grande

== Sports ==
The city has a football club, Câmara de Lobos, currently competing in the Campeonato de Portugal after escaping relegation in the 2019–20 season.

== Twin towns — sister cities ==
Câmara de Lobos is twinned with:

- Forio, Italy

== Economy ==
Although agriculture and fishing are still considered the primary sources of income, the area has grown as an extension of the tourism industry in the neighboring parishes. Its local development prospects are tied to the growing tourist market, while for six centuries of history it has been associated with the fishing and agriculture, in particular bananas and other fruits common to the island. Further, Madeira Wine, an important industry on the island, continues to drive the cultivation of local vineyards.

== Notable people ==
- Jaime Ornelas Camacho (1921 in Curral das Freiras – 2016) a Portuguese politician, the first President of the Regional Government of Madeira, 1976-1978
- Rúben Micael (born 1986 in Câmara de Lobos) a footballer with 407 club caps and 16 for Portugal
- Edgar Costa (born 1987 in Câmara de Lobos) a Portuguese footballer with 330 club caps
