= Jardim da Serra =

- Civil parish
- Location in Madeira
- Coordinates: 32°41′32″N 16°59′30″W
- Country: Portugal
- Auton. region: Madeira
- Island: Madeira
- Municipality: Câmara de Lobos

Area
  - Total: 7.36 km^{2} (2.84 sq mi)
- Elevation: 853 m (2,799 ft)

Population (2011)
  - Total: 3,311
  - Density: 450/km^{2} (1,170/sq mi)
- Time zone: UTC+00:00 (WET)
  - Summer (DST): UTC+01:00 (WEST)
- Postal code: 9325-272
- Area code: 291

Jardim da Serra (1909)

Jardim da Serra (Portuguese meaning "mountain garden") is a civil parish in the municipality of Câmara de Lobos in the archipelago of Madeira. The population in 2011 was 3,311, in an area of 7.36 km². It is located in the mountains north of the centre of Câmara de Lobos.
