= Campanário, Madeira =

Campanário
- Civil parish
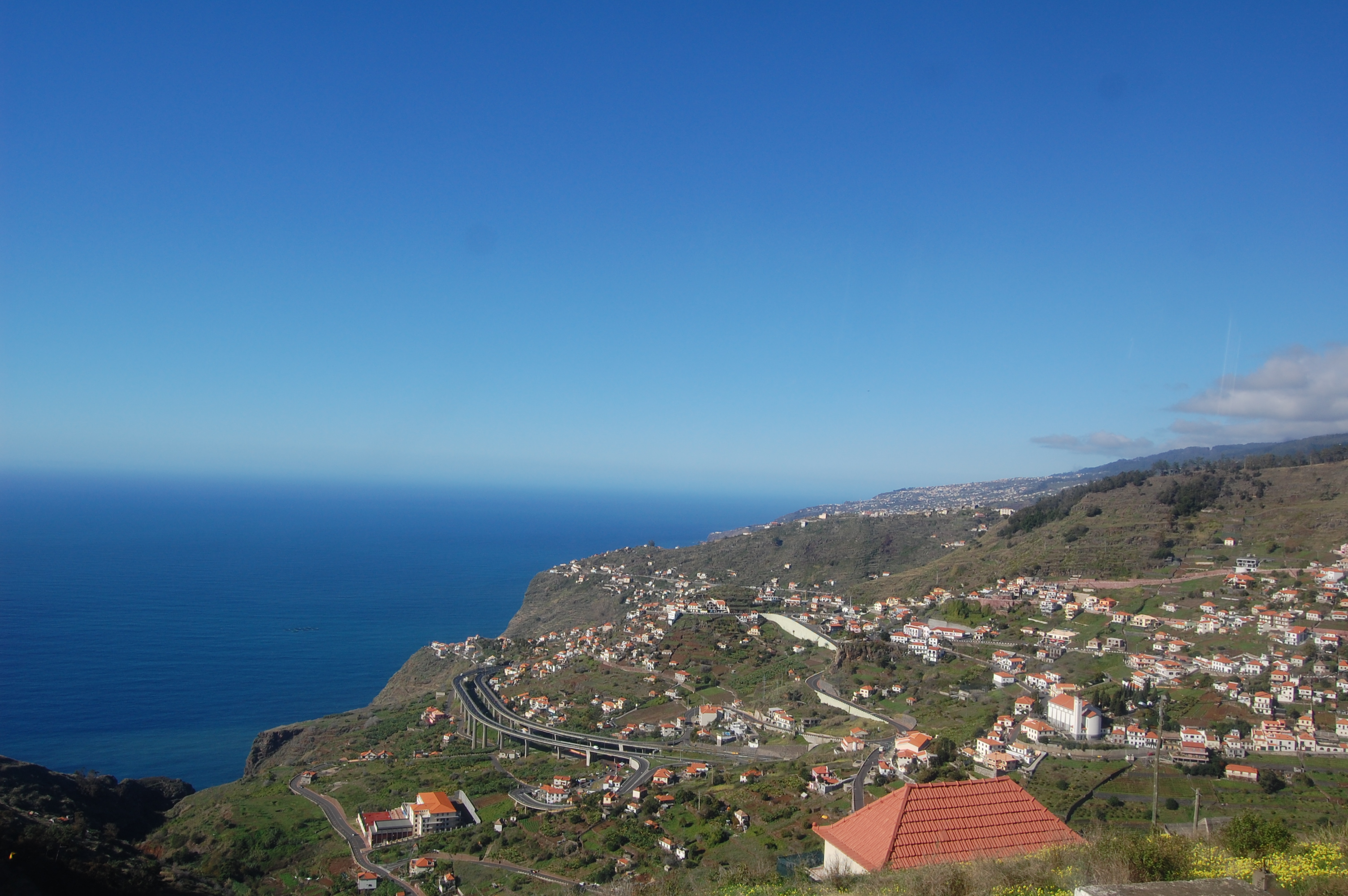

- Location in Madeira
- Coordinates: 32°41′7″N 17°1′23″W
- Country: Portugal
- Auton. region: Madeira
- Island: Madeira
- Municipality: Ribeira Brava

Area
  - Total: 11.74 km^{2} (4.53 sq mi)
- Elevation: 651 m (2,136 ft)

Population (2011)
  - Total: 4,582
  - Density: 390.3/km^{2} (1,011/sq mi)
- Time zone: UTC+00:00 (WET)
  - Summer (DST): UTC+01:00 (WEST)
- Postal code: 9350-037
- Area code: 291
- Patron: São Brás

Campanário is a civil parish in the municipality of Ribeira Brava in the Portuguese island of Madeira. The population in 2011 was 4,582, in an area of 11.74 km².

== History ==
The name campanário originated from the early explorers to the island of Madeira, when they passed near Cabo Girão. Upon seeing a tall islet, near this cliff face, its unusual shape (which resembled a bell tower) resulted in the region's etymology: campanário, is Portuguese for bell tower. Historically, Campanário was referred to as the celeiro das conquistas (Portuguese: Barn of the conquests), due to its importance in the cultivation of cereals that were exported to Northern Africa. Since the 16th century, in addition to the cultivation of wheat and rye, the fields of Campanário were sources of chestnut, also for export.

Although an exact is allusive, some documents refer to a settlement in Campanário by 1556 and a parish by 1698. Records for the parish São Brás in Campanário were begun in 1598 and are available online at FamilySearch.org. The local church was actually constructed in 1963, to substitute an older temple that was completed in 1683, in addition to a church in 1677.

Until 1835, the parish was part of the municipality of Funchal, but was transferred to Câmara de Lobos between 1835 and 1914.

== Geography ==
The second most populous parish of Ribeira Brava, Campanário is situated along the southern coast of the municipality.

The parish consists of the following localities: Achada, Adêga, Calçada, Carmo, Chamorra, Chapim, Corujeira, Cova da Velha, Fajã dos Padres, Fajã Velha, Furnas e Amoreira, Igreja, Jardim, Lapa e Massapez, Lombo do Romão, Longueira, Lugar da Ribeira, Lugar da Serra, Palmeira, Pedra Nossa Senhora, Pedregal, Pinheiro, Porta Nova, Porto da Ribeira, Quebrada, Roda e Massapez, Rodes, São João, Serrado, Terreiros, Tranqual, Vigia and Voltas.

== Economy ==
Of the active population, 35% are dedicated to agriculture: potato, vineyards, banana, oranges and tropical fruits, are the most profitable of these primary activities. In industry, construction, carpentry and sawmilling, automobile services, and quarrying, cement services and marble-cutting are typical jobs associated with this parish.
