= 2024 Madeira wildfires =

Natural disasters in Portugal

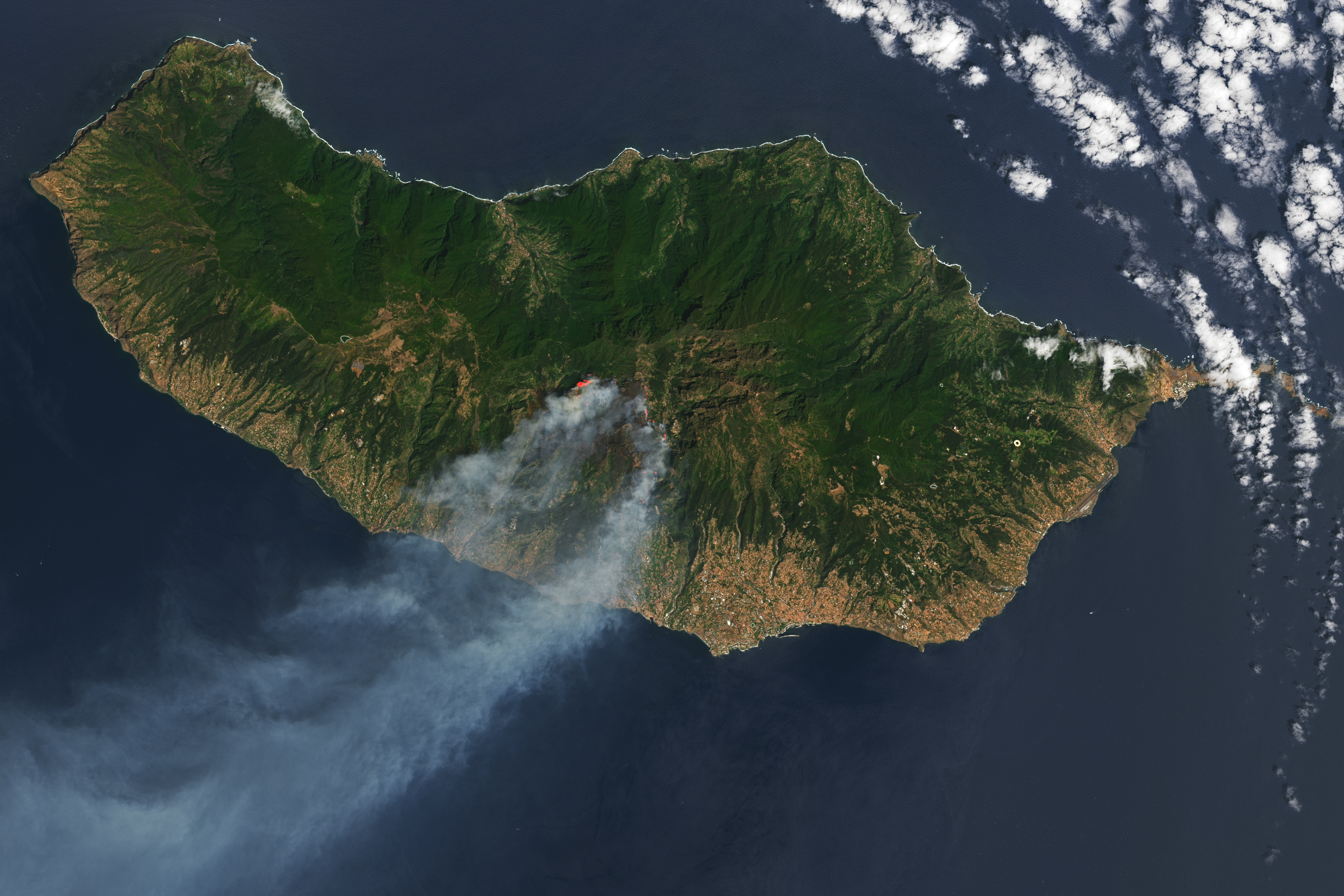
- Wildfires in Madeira on August 17, captured from space by the Landsat 8 satellite, featured as the NASA Earth Observatory image of the day on August 21, 2024
- Date: 14–25 August
- Location: Madeira

Statistics
- Total fires: 1
- Total area: 5,116 hectares (19.8 square miles)

Impacts
- Deaths: 0
- Injuries: 2
- Structures lost: 0

Ignition
- Cause: Exceptionally dry conditions, excessive heat, strong wind gusts

The 2024 Madeira wildfires were a series of wildfires that began on August 14, 2024, on the Portuguese island of Madeira, 700 kilometres (430 mi) west of Morocco. The fire spread to at least five municipalities, devastating forest and rural areas. As of August 20, the flames had burned more than 5,700 hectares (14,000 acres) of forest, according to the European Forest Fire Information System.

The fire started in the mountains of Serra de Água on August 14, and spread east toward Curral das Freiras and Câmara de Lobos. Other affected municipalities include Ribeira Brava, Ponta do Sol, São Vicente, and Santana. Around midnight on August 20–21, the fire reached the summit of the island’s highest peak, Pico Ruivo, and was burning through the laurel forest in Lombo do Urzal, Boaventura, São Vicente. Municipal Emergency Plans were activated in Ribeira Brava, Câmara de Lobos, and Ponta do Sol.

After a week, the fires remained active, primarily affecting Curral das Freiras and the Central Mountain Massif, and impacting the laurel forest, a UNESCO World Heritage Site.

On August 20, three firefighters (two from the Azores and one from mainland Portugal) required medical attention, with two hospitalized for "symptoms related to malaise and discomfort".

By the morning of August 21, 8,162 hectares (20,170 acres) had burned, representing 14% of the island’s forest area, making it the worst wildfire in 14 years and the second worst in 25 years.

== Background ==
On August 14, Madeira Island was under the influence of a hot, dry tropical air mass, with a yellow heat warning issued by the Portuguese Institute for Sea and Atmosphere. The warning was upgraded to amber for the south coast and mountainous regions on August 16. The Port of Funchal Authority issued a strong wind warning for fresh to very fresh north-northeast winds, worsening in the afternoon, valid until 6:00 p.m. on August 15. High temperatures ranging from 27 to 31 °C (81 to 88 °F), strong winds, and humidity below 30% prompted the Madeira Regional Civil Protection Service to issue recommendations to the public later that day due to the elevated wildfire risk in rural areas.

== Causes ==
The cause of the initial fire in Serra de Água at 8:00 a.m. on August 14 remains unknown and is under investigation by the Portuguese Judicial Police. Initial reports suggesting a firework from the Our Lady of Help festival, the patron saint of the parish, caused the fire were unconfirmed by Regional Operational Commander Marco Lobato and Serra de Água Parish Council President Albertina Ferreira, as the midday firework display had been canceled, and no fireworks were lit.

High temperatures around 30 °C (86 °F) and strong winds with gusts up to 70 kilometres per hour (43 mph) helped spreading the fire through the island's tree-covered mountains.

The lack of land maintenance was identified as a factor contributing to the rapid spread of the fire in Jardim da Serra.

== Progression ==
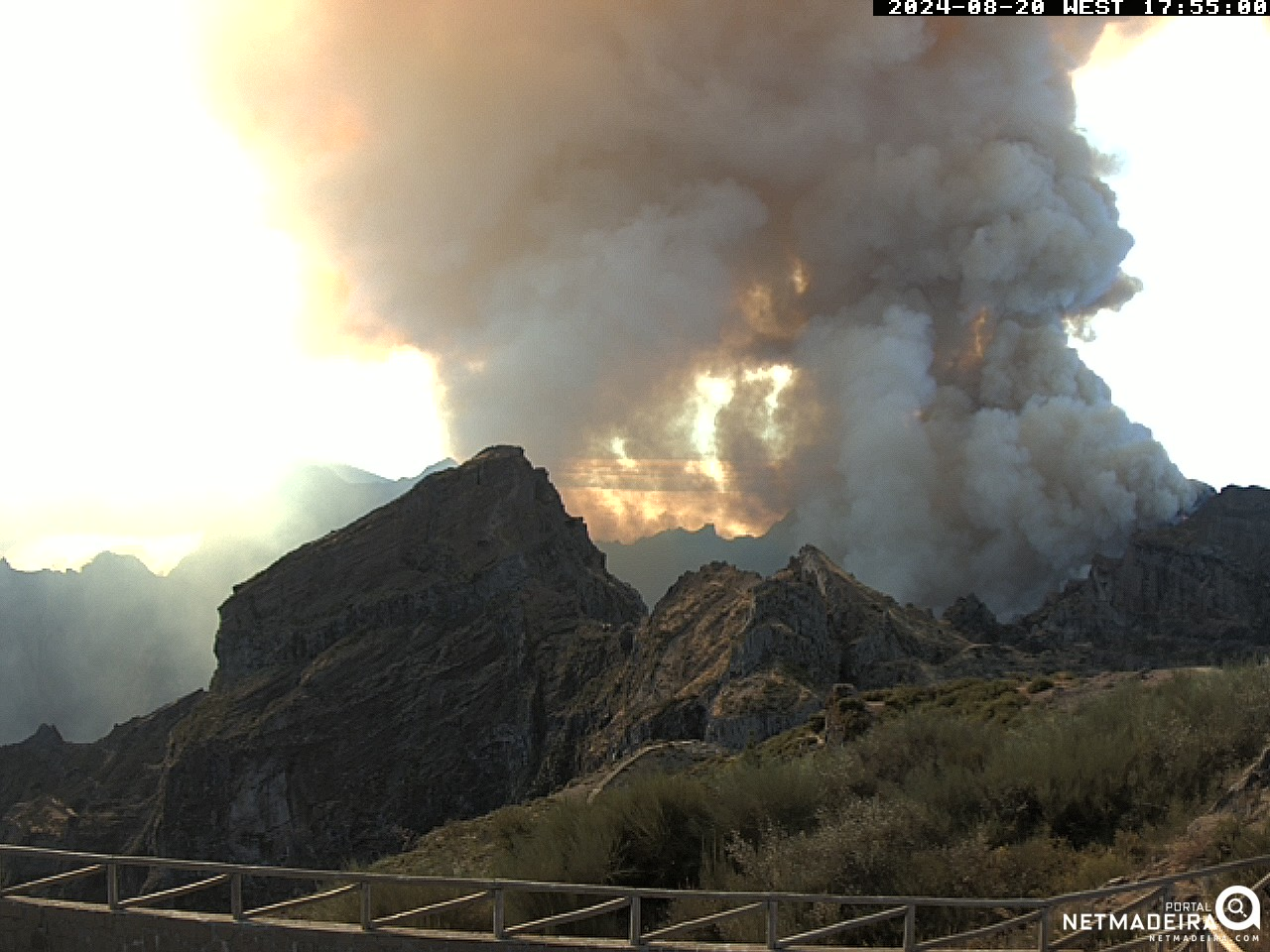
Fire on Pico do Areeiro

The fire began on the morning of August 14 on a steep slope in the Serra de Água parish. Initially, it was fought by six members of the Ribeira Brava and Ponta do Sol Firefighters, supported by a heavy firefighting vehicle and the Madeira Regional Civil Protection Service’s multi-mission helicopter, with strong winds hindering efforts.

On August 15, the fire was tackled by 15 firefighters (ten from the Ribeira Brava and Ponta do Sol Firefighters and five from the Madeira Volunteer Firefighters) supported by four firefighting vehicles, ten members of the helitransported team, and the Regional Civil Protection Service’s aerial support. In the afternoon, resources were reinforced with 21 firefighters from both fire brigades and the Câmara de Lobos Volunteer Firefighters, supported by five firefighting vehicles and a command vehicle.

By August 17, 56 workers from the Câmara de Lobos Volunteer Firefighters, Funchal Fire Brigade, Madeira Volunteer Firefighters, Ribeira Brava and Ponta do Sol Firefighters, Santa Cruz Fire Brigade, and Machico Municipal Firefighters were deployed, along with members of the Regional Operations Command and the Regional Civil Protection Service’s Mobile Telecommunications and Emergency Unit.

The extent, intensity, and impact of the fire led to an image from the Landsat 8 satellite’s Operational Land Imager being selected as the NASA Earth Observatory’s image of the day on August 21, depicting the fire’s progression across three fronts on August 17, 2024.

By 10:00 p.m. on August 22, the fire remained active on two fronts: one in the Central Mountain Massif, particularly at Pico Ruivo and Pico do Gato, and another one in Ponta do Sol in the Lombada area. Over 120 personnel and more than a dozen resources, including all regional fire brigades, firefighters from the Azores, and the Special Civil Protection Force, were mobilized.

Canadair CL-415 aircraft from the Spanish Air Force were deployed for the first time that day, focusing on the Central Mountain Massif, carrying out eight water releases with positive effects in reducing fire intensity. The helicopter performed 35 releases on the two active fronts, targeting hard-to-reach and high-risk areas.

=== Affected Municipalities ===
==== Ribeira Brava ====
The fire began on the morning of August 14 in a hard-to-access area of dense vegetation on a steep slope in the Serra de Água parish, with strong winds hampering firefighting efforts. By 1:45 p.m., two active fronts were being fought by the Ribeira Brava and Ponta do Sol Firefighters. The aerial unit conducted five water releases, though operations were hampered by wind. Before 5:45 p.m., the aerial unit’s mission was aborted due to strong winds.

On August 15, the fire spread to Espigão and Trompica, with only one active front. In the afternoon, firefighting resources were reinforced, and the Espigão road was closed due to the risk of falling rocks, along with the classified P12-Caminho Real da Encumeada trail. By 4:30 p.m., with the fire burning on two fronts, the aerial unit’s mission was again aborted due to wind.

On August 16, the active front in Ribeira Brava was considered contained, burning in inaccessible areas of Trompica and Lugar da Serra.

On August 17, residents of Lombo do Moleiro in Serra de Água were evacuated to the Ribeira Brava pavilion. That night, the Estalagem da Encumeada hotel at the top of Serra de Água was evacuated as a precaution measure due to the approaching fire, with 150 people relocated via São Vicente, as the regional road to the parish center was closed.

On August 18, roads to São Vicente, including the Via Expresso and the Encumeada Tunnel, as well as the Encumeada Regional Road, were closed.

Residents of Furna in the Ribeira Brava parish were evacuated but returned home by August 20. The municipality activated its Municipal Emergency Plan.

On August 22, the fires caused water supply disruptions in the Apresentação, Pomar da Rocha, Achada, and Furna areas of Ribeira Brava, due to ash and debris contaminating water tanks.

==== Câmara de Lobos ====
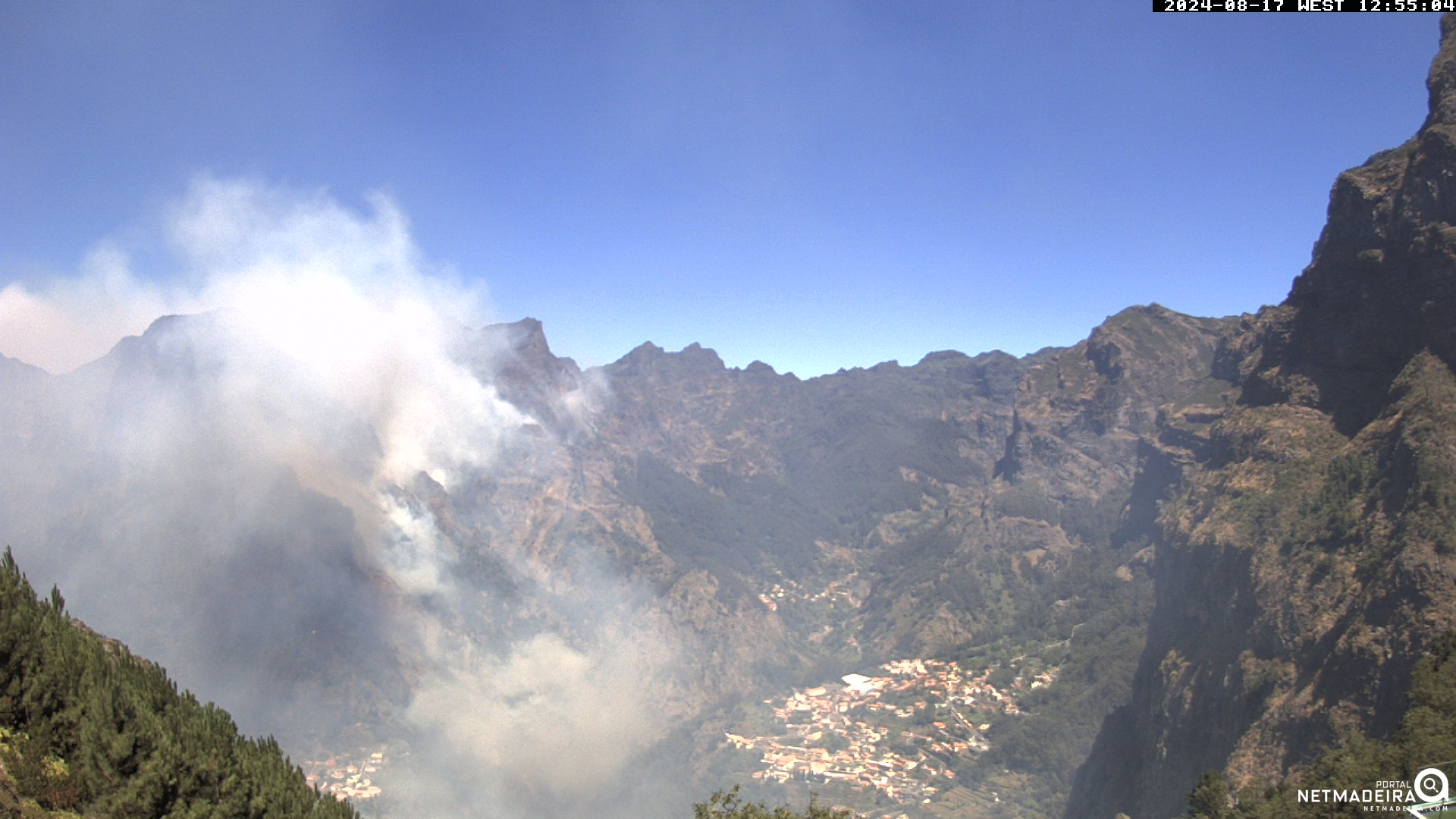
Fire in Curral das Freiras at 12:55 p.m. on August 17

In the municipality of Câmara de Lobos, the parishes of Jardim da Serra and Curral das Freiras were severely impacted.

By early afternoon on August 16, the fire reached Curral das Freiras, burning on the highest western peaks of the parish, but was considered contained in Boca da Corrida.

In the early hours of August 17, the fire threatened the Seara Velha and Terra Chã de Cima areas, leading to the evacuation of over 50 residents for safety, carried out by the Câmara de Lobos Municipal Civil Protection Service, with two active fronts. The only access road to the parish was closed.

That same day, the fire threatened homes in the Corrida area of Jardim da Serra, spreading from Boca da Corrida to Boca dos Namorados, moving toward the parish center. In the afternoon, as flames approached, around 60 residents of Fajã das Galinhas, situated in the Estreito de Câmara de Lobos parish, south of Boca dos Namorados, were told to evacuate. Other reports indicated 120 residents were evacuated from this area with no prospect of returning to their homes for at least two weeks due to unsafe road conditions caused by landslides and fallen trees and debris.

On August 18, the road to Curral das Freiras was closed except for residents. By late afternoon, the fire was reported as controlled in this area. By early evening on August 19, the fire had become uncontrolled again in hard-to-access areas, spreading toward homes.

On August 20, access to the parish, including Fajã dos Cardos in Curral de Cima, was reopened, with the fire burning in the mountains away from homes. By the end of the day, the situation worsened again, with Fajã dos Cardos being the most concerning area, as the fire was highly active in Caldeirão do Urzal. The municipality activated its Municipal Emergency Plan.

==== Ponta do Sol ====
On August 15, ash from the fire in neighboring Ribeira Brava covered parts of the Ponta do Sol beach.

In Ponta do Sol, on August 20, the fire had spread from Bica da Cana in Paul da Serra to the Ponta do Sol river, burning in hard-to-access areas. On the same day, the municipality activated its Municipal Emergency Plan.

By the end of August 21, about 100 personnel, supported by five heavy and two light vehicles, continued to fight the fire in the Quinta area of Lombada, near homes, with Levada Nova and Levada do Moinho closed due to falling rocks. According to Célia Pessegueiro, mayor of Ponta do Sol, the absence of aerial support significantly influenced the fire’s progression along the Ponta do Sol riverbanks.

By 10:00 p.m. on August 22, the fire remained active in the Lombada area. A new fire, allegedly caused by arson, emerged that afternoon but was confined to higher elevations, away from residential areas.

==== São Vicente ====
Shortly after 11:30 p.m. on August 20, flames were visible on the highest peaks of Lombo do Urzal in the Boaventura parish of São Vicente, burning through areas of laurel forest.

==== Santana ====
Shortly before midnight on August 21, Márcio Dinarte Fernandes, mayor of Santana, confirmed that the fire had reached the summit of Pico Ruivo, the island’s highest peak, forcing the evacuation of the firefighting team and the shelter lookout to Achada do Teixeira.

That day, the Santana Municipal Council closed vehicle and pedestrian access to Parque das Queimadas, Levada do Rei, and Cascalho in the São Jorge parish, and to Vale da Lapa in the Ilha parish, due to fires burning in the municipality’s higher elevations.

== National and international assistance ==
Madeira wildfires and UCPM response

On August 17, a first contingent of 76 members from the Autoridade Nacional de Emergência e Proteção Civil (ANEPC) arrived in the region.

On August 21, the ANEPC announced reinforcements of 60 additional personnel to put out the fire, deployed from mainland Portugal via a KC-390 aircraft of the Portuguese Air Force, led by Rodolfo Batista, the second sub-regional commander of the West. This contingent included 29 firefighters from the Special Civil Protection Force (FEPC), 15 volunteer firefighters from the Greater Lisbon region, and 15 military personnel from the National Republican Guard’s Emergency Protection and Rescue Unit (UEPS). The initial 45-member contingent landed at Madeira Airport in the early afternoon, transported by a C-130 military aircraft.

That same day, the Regional Government of Madeira activated the European Civil Protection Mechanism, enabling the deployment of two Canadair CL-415 aircraft from the Spanish Air Force, arriving from Málaga on August 22. Each aircraft can collect 6,000 liters (1,600 U.S. gal) of water in 12 seconds, marking the first time the region used such aerial resources to combat wildfires. The aircraft began operations that day, focusing on the Central Mountain Range, conducting eight water releases, effectively reducing fire intensity.

== Impact ==
By the morning of August 21, 8,162 hectares (20,170 acres) had burned, representing 14% of the island’s forest area, making it the worst wildfire in 14 years and the second worst in 25 years. According to António Nunes, president of the Regional Civil Protection Service, the actual burned area was 4,392 hectares (10,850 acres) as of noon on August 20, based on data from the European Forest Fire Information System (Copernicus). He noted that discrepancies in estimates arose from measurements based on outer perimeters, ignoring unburned vegetation pockets within.

The same system, using Aqua and Terra satellites, detected over 5,700 hectares (14,000 acres) of burned area that day, primarily woodlands, shrublands, and broadleaf forests.

By August 19, approximately 160 people had been evacuated. After the first week, about 200 people had left their homes, with most returning by August 21, except for residents of Fajã das Galinhas.

By the end of August 22, the burned area was updated to 5,002.4 hectares (12,361 acres), based on the European Forest Fire Information System.

=== Endemic Forest ===
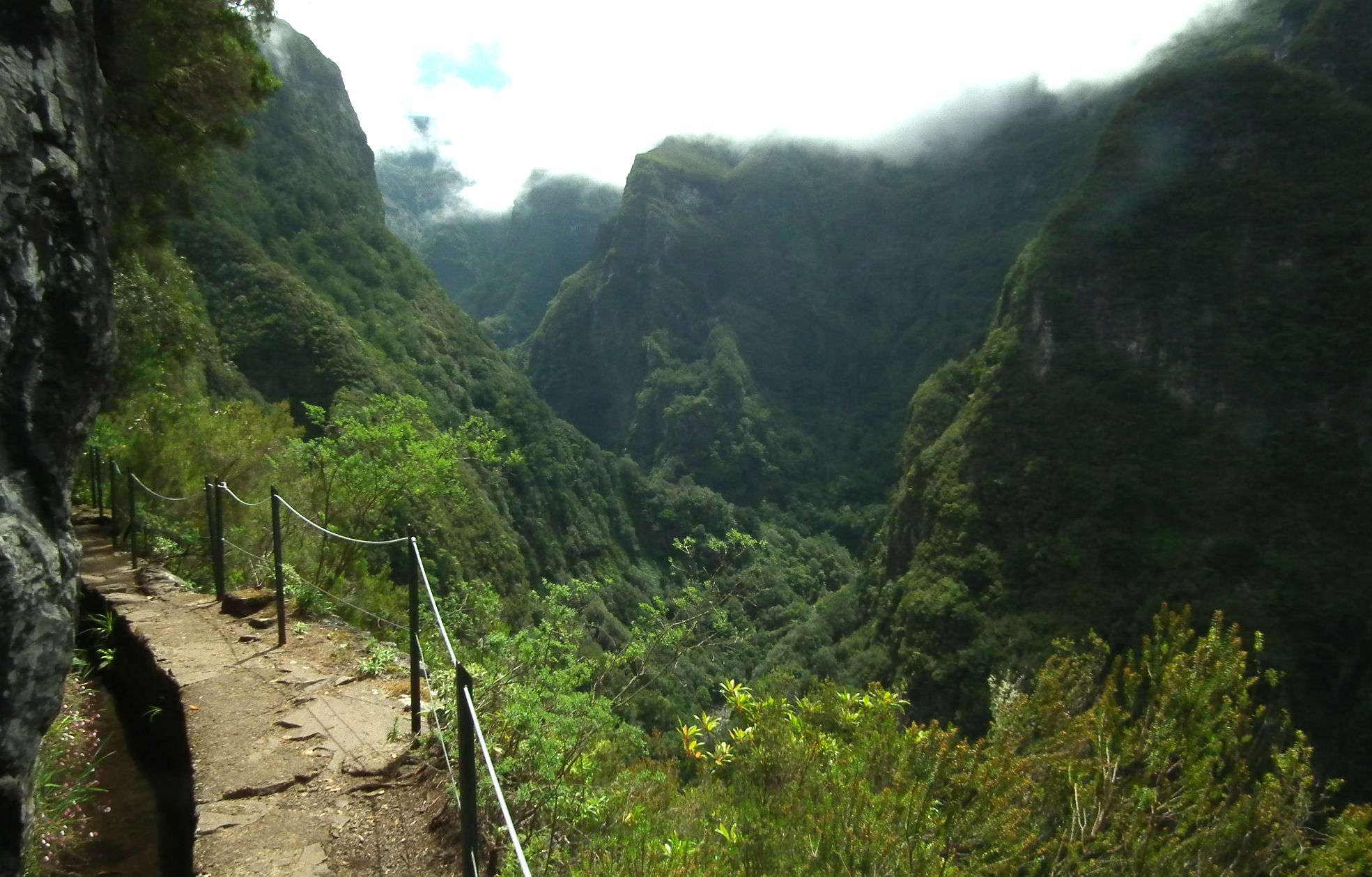
Laurel forest in Madeira, a UNESCO Natural World Heritage Site

Although official statements from the Regional Government of Madeira claimed the laurel forest, primarily located in the island’s north, was safe from the fire, researchers believe significant ecosystems have already been affected, risking the loss of species yet to be described. The forest, home to dozens of endemic species, is classified as a UNESCO Natural World Heritage Site and Biosphere Reserve, representing the last significant remnant of an ecosystem typical of Southern Europe and the Mediterranean from three million years ago. The laurel forest is vital for Madeira’s biodiversity, tourism, water retention, erosion control, and mitigation of catastrophic floods.

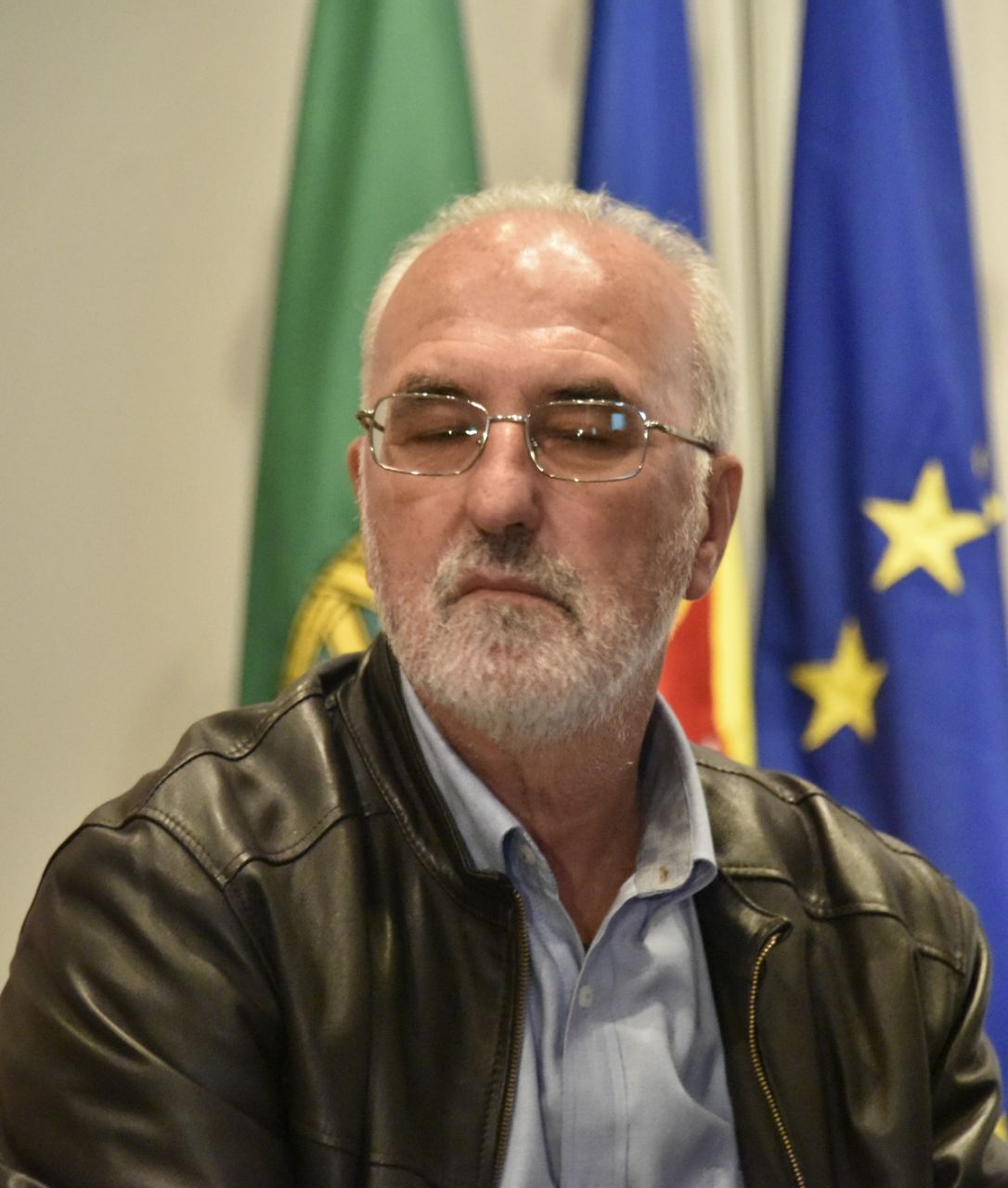
Raimundo Quintal, a retired University of Lisbon researcher and geographer specializing in phytogeography and Madeira’s endemic flora

According to Raimundo Quintal, a retired University of Lisbon researcher and geographer specializing in phytogeography and Madeira’s endemic flora, areas of laurel forest were impacted when the fire reached Boca da Torrinha on August 20, spreading toward Boaventura on the northern slope opposite Curral das Freiras.

According to Miguel Sequeira, a botanist and professor at the University of Madeira familiar with the affected areas, many critical ecosystems, including small patches of Mediterranean laurel forest on Madeira’s southern slope—known as barbusano laurel forest, adapted to drier climates with lower rainfall—have been affected. Successive fires with short intervals prevent ecosystems from recovering to their climax state, threatening the habitat of many animal species at risk of extinction. Sequeira notes that 50% of Madeira’s 110 endemic plant species are found in the southern zone, not the northern laurel forest. As of 2024, he is describing ten new plant species for science and believes more undiscovered species are at risk of extinction. He considers the failure to prevent ecological disasters in Madeira a "civilizational failure".

On August 22, in an interview with Rádio Renascença, Sequeira confirmed that areas of laurel forest, Natura 2000 Network sites, and the Madeira Natural Park had been burned, and will potentially take 180 years to recover. He highlighted the loss of significant laurel forest fragments on the southern slope, particularly in the valleys of Ponta do Sol, Ribeira Brava, and Curral das Freiras.

=== Political Repercussions ===
On August 22, the Madeira delegation of the Journalists’ Union reported a state of pressure and restrictions hindering journalists covering the wildfires, extending to media outlet managers pressured to retract accurate reports. An example was the denial by Regional Government of Madeira sources of a Diário de Notícias report about the arrival of two Canadair CL-415 aircraft from the Spanish Air Force, which was confirmed two hours later by Regional Government President Miguel Albuquerque. On August 17, journalists, camera operators, and photojournalists were denied access to Curral das Freiras, with the Public Security Police (PSP) explicitly instructed to block media access. A similar incident occurred on the night of August 18 in Fajã dos Cardos, where RTP Madeira and CNN Portugal teams were forced by the PSP to leave, with orders to allow only residents to remain. The CNN Portugal team was escorted out by the PSP.

== Prospects ==
Climate change is driving an increase in both the frequency and intensity of extreme wildfires worldwide. Over the past two decades, their occurrence has more than doubled, with the most severe years recorded since 2017. Portugal, including Madeira, has been particularly affected in recent years. Madeira’s climate, combined with its history of wildfires, suggests that the island will continue to face this threat. Natural conditions such as prolonged dry spells, strong winds, and rugged terrain make it especially vulnerable to fires.

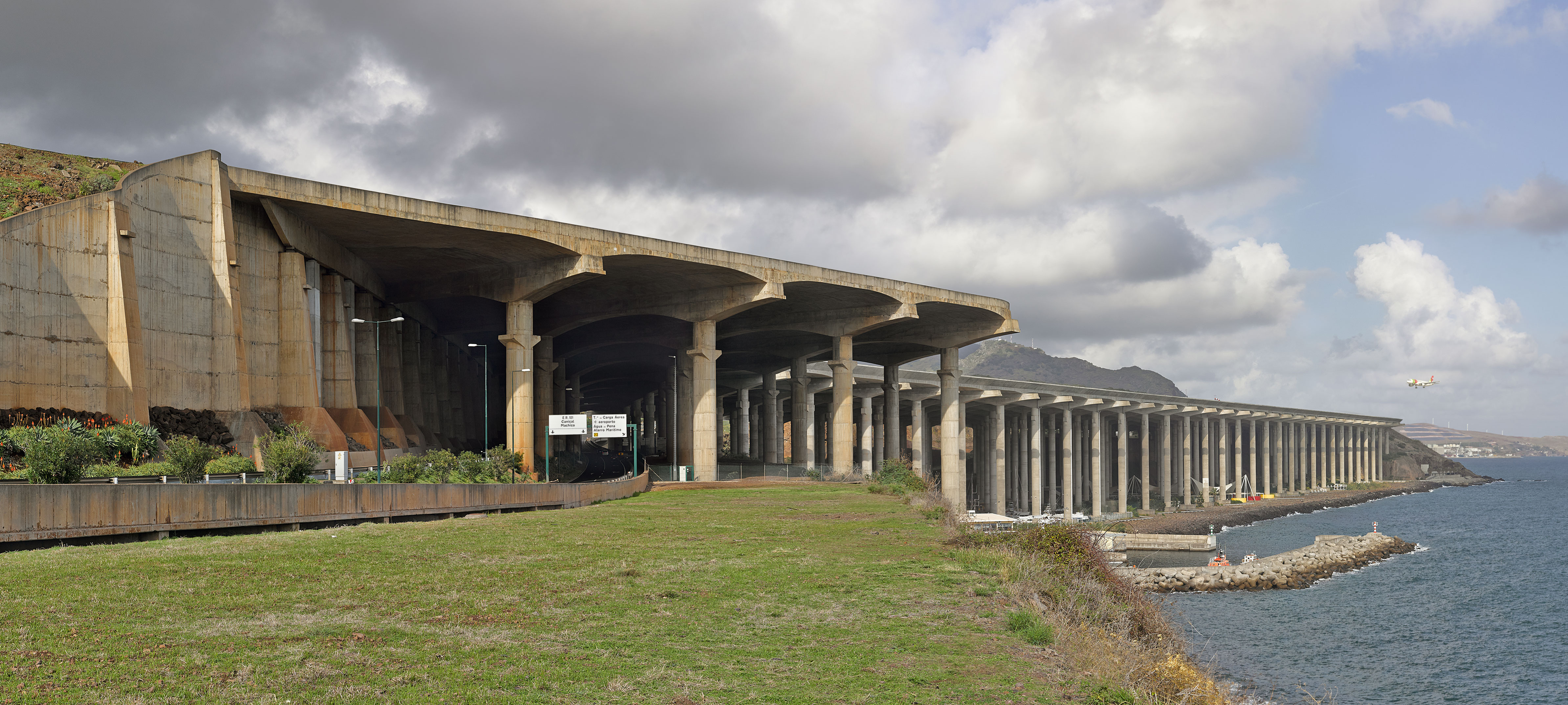
Many tourists were stranded at Madeira Airport due to flight cancellations during the 2024 series of wildfires

While advancements in firefighting have significantly reduced the risk to human life, the environmental and economic consequences remain severe. Wildfires endanger homes, disrupt livelihoods, and damage the island’s unique natural landscapes. The economic impact extends to Madeira’s tourism industry, a vital part of the local economy, which suffers from the negative perception caused by wildfires. During the 2024 wildfires, tourist cancellations surged by 90% as the blaze continued for 11 days.

Despite improved wildfire management, the risk persists. Both residents and visitors must remain vigilant as Madeira continues to grapple with this ongoing challenge.

== See also ==
- 2024 Portugal wildfires
