= Serra de Água =

- Civil parish
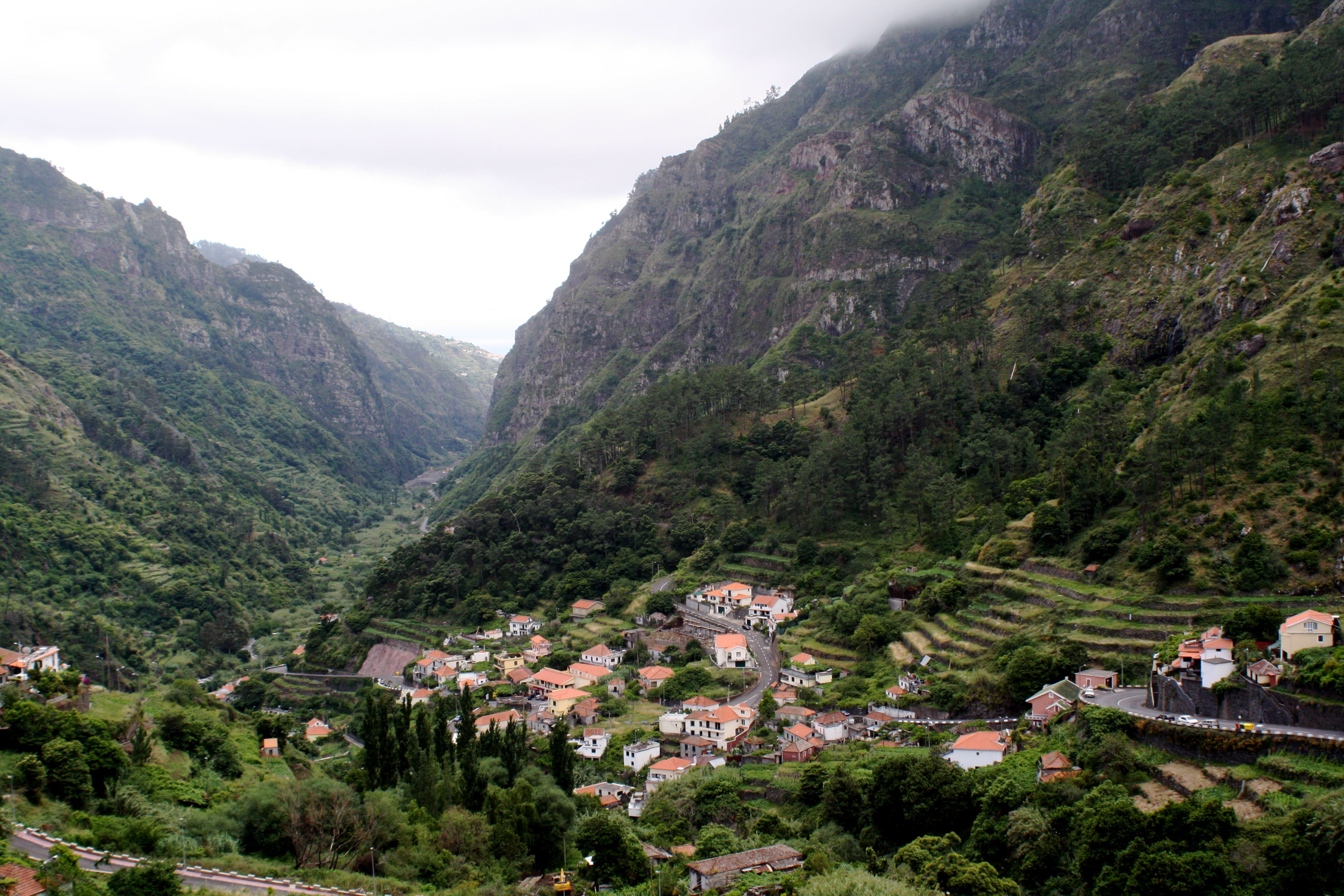
- Secluded in the mountains of the interior, the main village of Serra de Água

- Location in Madeira
- Coordinates: 32°43′40″N 17°1′40″W
- Country: Portugal
- Auton. region: Madeira
- Island: Madeira
- Municipality: Ribeira Brava
- Established: Settlement: 28 December 1676; Parish: c. 1680; Civil parish: c. 1914

Area
  - Total: 24.16 km^{2} (9.33 sq mi)

Population (2011)
  - Total: 1,049
  - Density: 43.42/km^{2} (112.5/sq mi)
- Time zone: UTC+00:00 (WET)
  - Summer (DST): UTC+01:00 (WEST)
- Postal code: 9350-323
- Area code: 291
- Patron: Nossa Senhora da Ajuda
- Website: www.jfserradeagua.ifreg.pt

Serra de Água (Portuguese meaning literally mountain range of water) is a civil parish in the municipality of Ribeira Brava on the Portuguese island of Madeira. The population in 2011 was 1,049, in an area of 24.16 km^{2}.

== History ==
Serra de Água's name is derived from the historical construction of a watermill used for sawmilling, that was named serra de água, and later became applied to the entire parish. Wood was the first of livelihood and income for the early settlers to Madeira, and due to the abundance of vegetation in Serra de Água the sawmills, commercial exportation of wood was very profitable.

The parish was created on 28 December 1676 (but never became a functioning ecclesiastical parish until 1680), from a portion of the municipality of Ponta do Sol.

Administratively, it was an annex of Ribeira Brava after 18 October 1881. Later, it functioned as part of Ponta do Sol, after the creation of Ponta do Sol (in 1835), returning to the redefined municipality of Ribeira Brava in 1914, as an autonomous civil parish.

In 1953, the parish was the first site of a central hydroelectric station on the island.

== Geography ==
The parish is situated in the southwest part of the island, encircled by dense vegetation and high mountains, including specifically the Picoda Cruz, Pico do Cedro and Pico Grande. The lands are irrigated by numerous ravines, such as the Ribeira da Fajã das Éguas, Ribeira do Poço and Ribeira da Serra de Água (which are affluentes of the Ribeira da Ribeira Brava, the main waterway in the municipality).

Serra de Água is situated 8 kilometres (5.0 mi) from the municipal seat of Ribeira Brava, connected by a regional road. It is bordered on the west by Tabua, São Vicente to the northwest and northeast; Ponta Delgada in the northeast; Curral das Freiras and Campanário to the east, while Ribeira Brava is to the south.

== Economy ==
Encircled by tall mountains, the parish is located in a valley and supported by diverse ravines, making agriculture difficult to sustain. Saw-milling was one of the first industries to establish itself, owing to the availability of wood and forest.

Yet, agriculture is the predominant economic activity in the civil parish, a function that has persisted on a subsistence basis since the settlement of Madeira. Around 60% of the population is involved in cultivation, with 80% of these lands taken by small parcels, usually for self-consumption.

Secondary industries are primarily hotelery and civil construction, which occupy a considerable portion of work placements.
