= Boca dos Namorados =

Viewpoint on Madeira Island, Portugal

Boca dos Namorados is a viewpoint in Madeira, Portugal. Situated in the parish of Jardim da Serra, Câmara de Lobos at an altitude of 1067 meters, it offers a view over Curral das Freiras.

Boca dos Namorados

== History ==
Boca dos Namorados was a popular stop for those going to the yearly religious festival in Curral das Freiras in honour of Nossa Senhora do Livramento, the parish's patron, with improvised stands providing food and drinks. It was part of Estreito de Camara de Lobos until 1996, when Jardim da Serra was promoted to parish.

== Access ==
Car access to the Boca dos Namorados viewpoint is available. A 5 kilometer footpath connects Boca dos Namorados to Curral das Freiras. The trek takes around two and a half hours to complete and ends at Lombo Chão (altitude of 400 meters), south of the centre of Curral das Freiras.

== Gallery ==
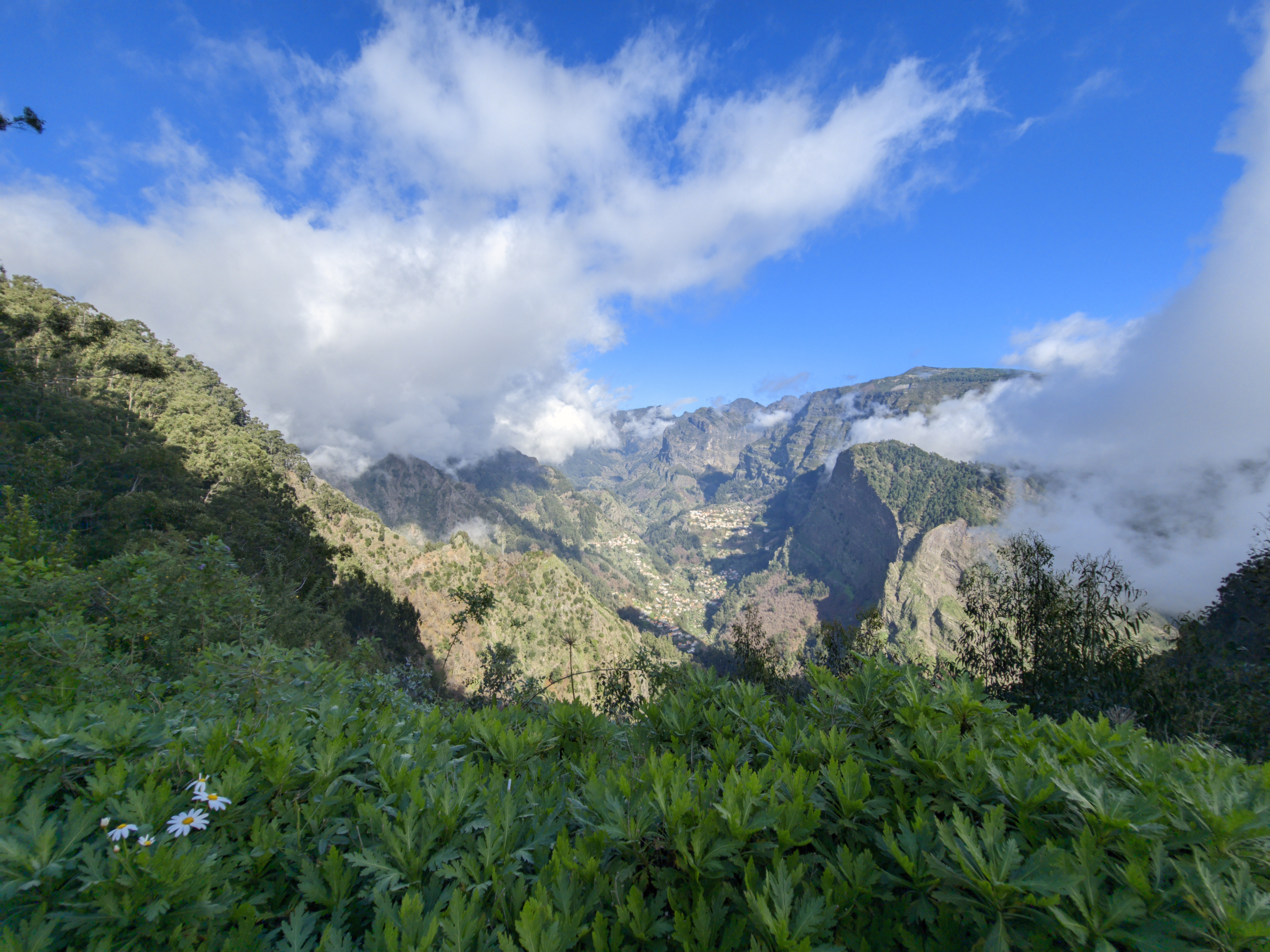
Curral das Freiras from Boca dos Namorados

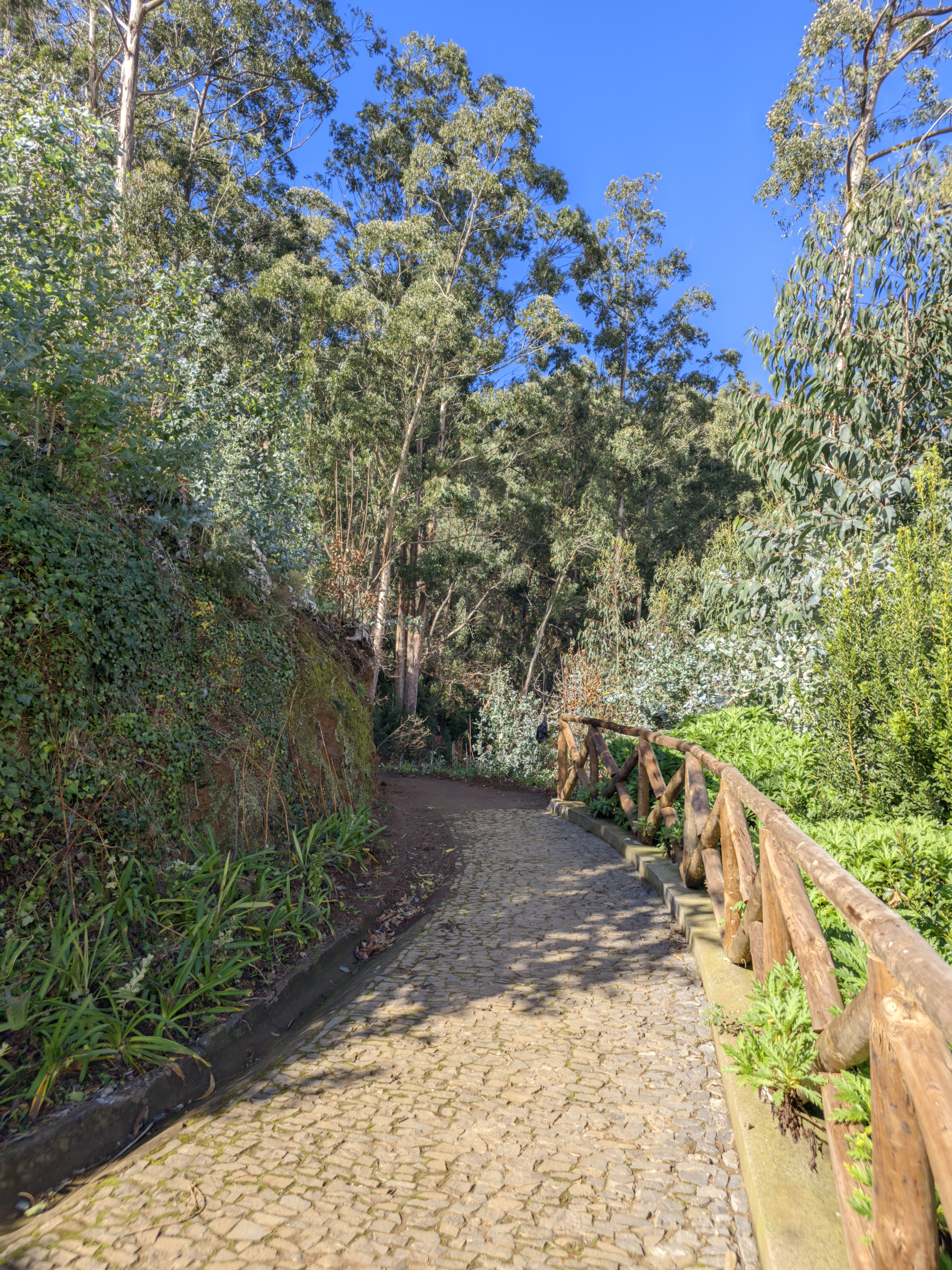
The start of the footpath to Curral das Freiras

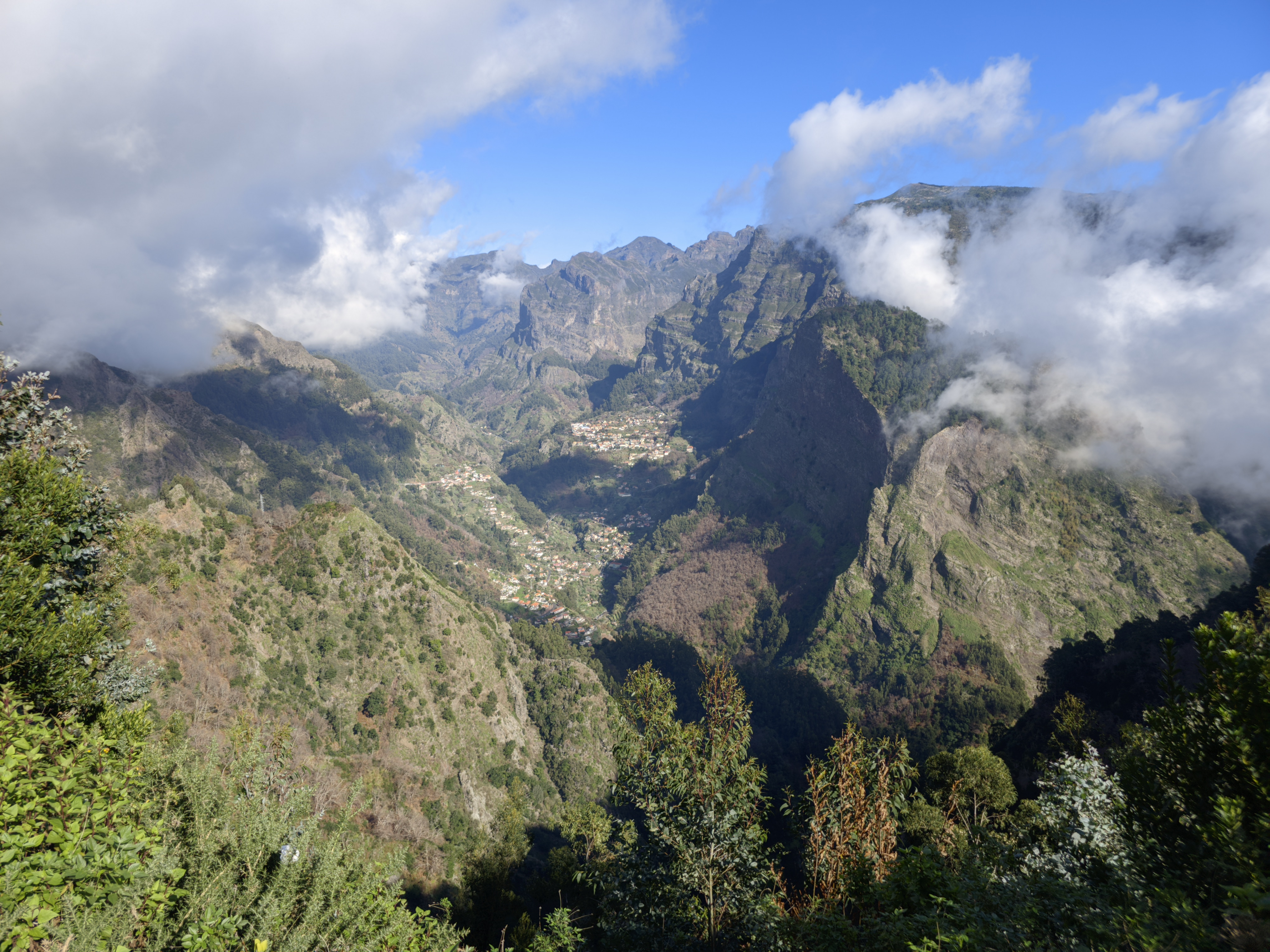
Curral das Freiras

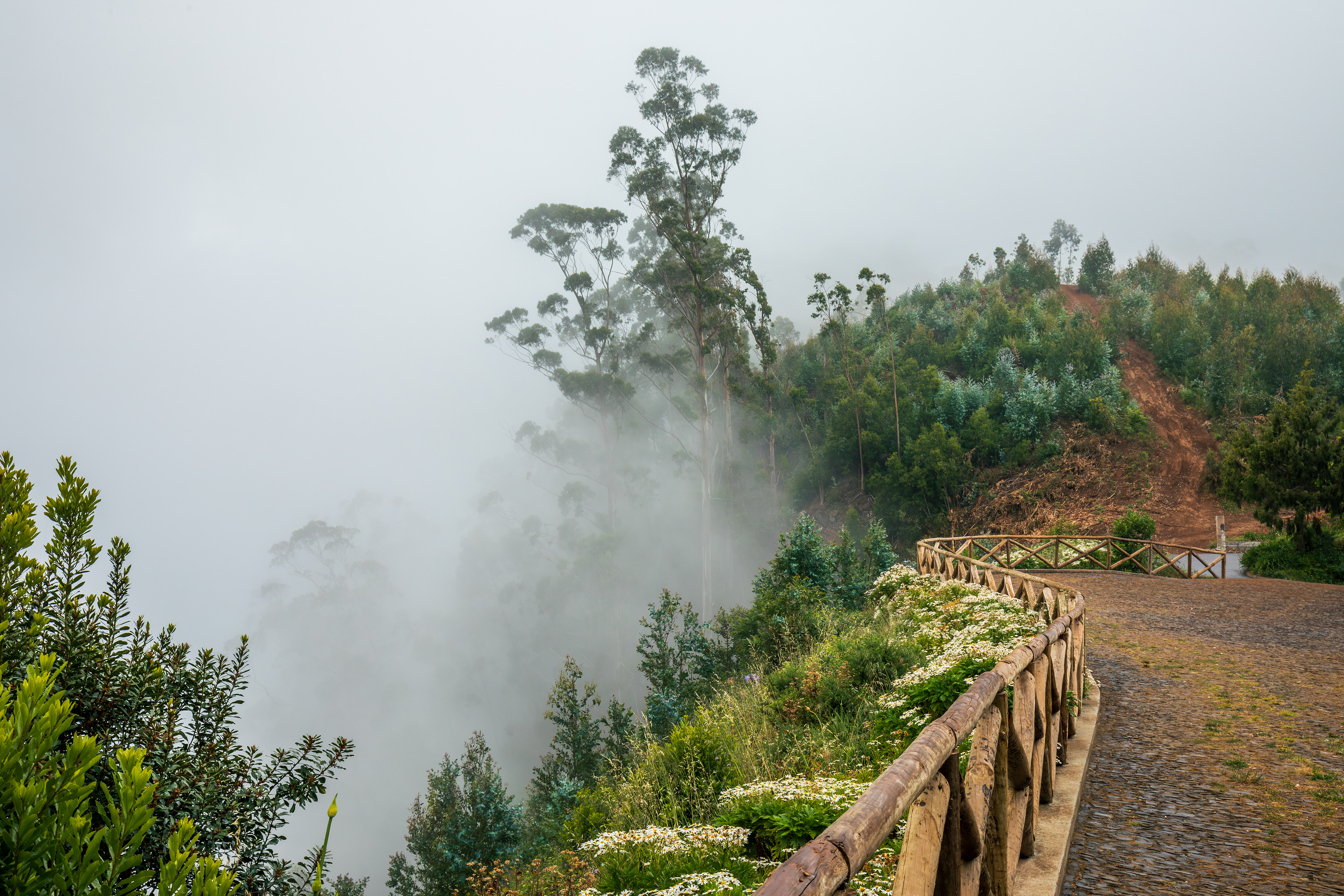
Cloudy day

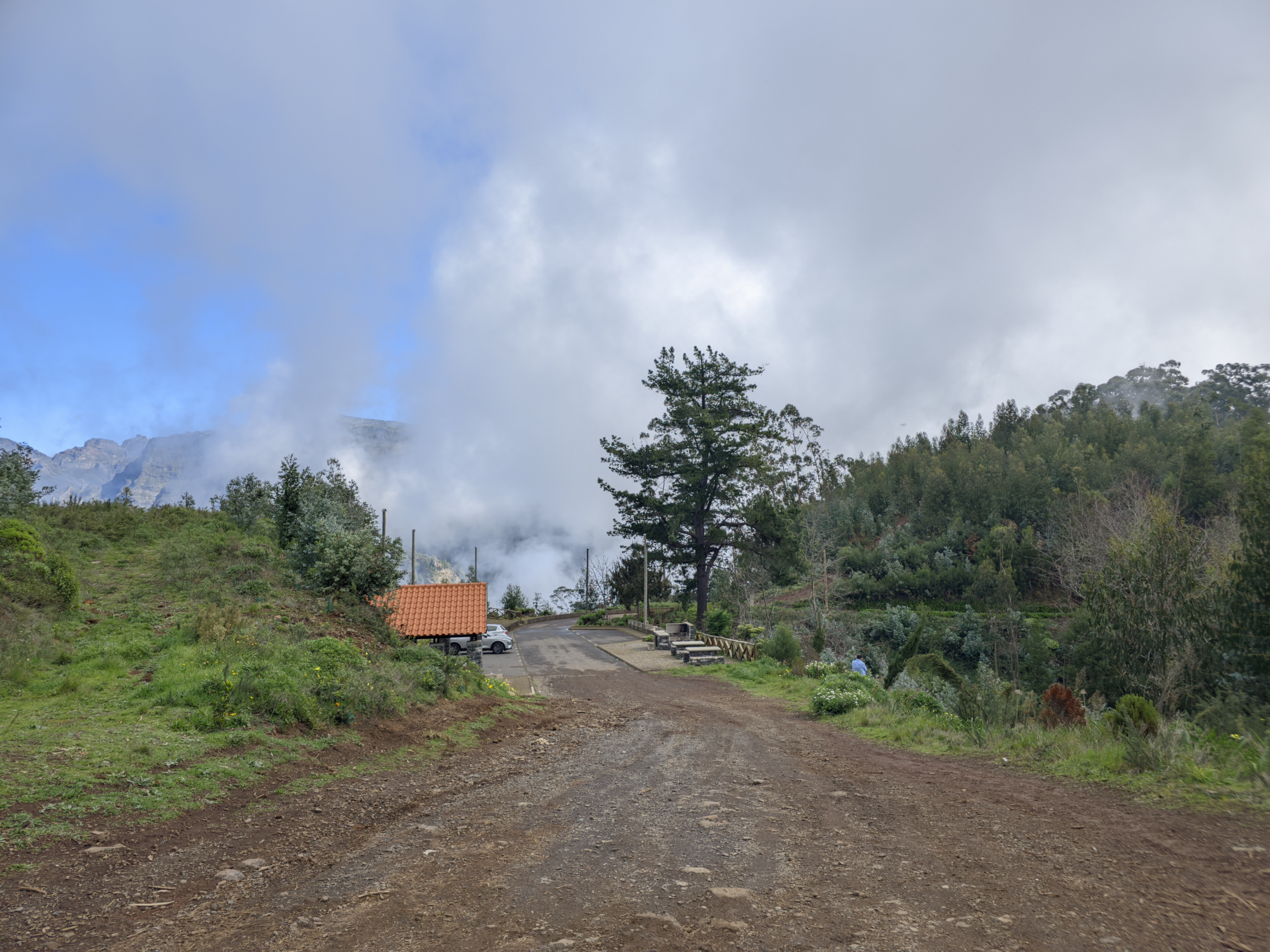
Looking down at the viewpoint
