= Ponta Delgada, São Vicente =

Ponta Delgada
- Civil parish
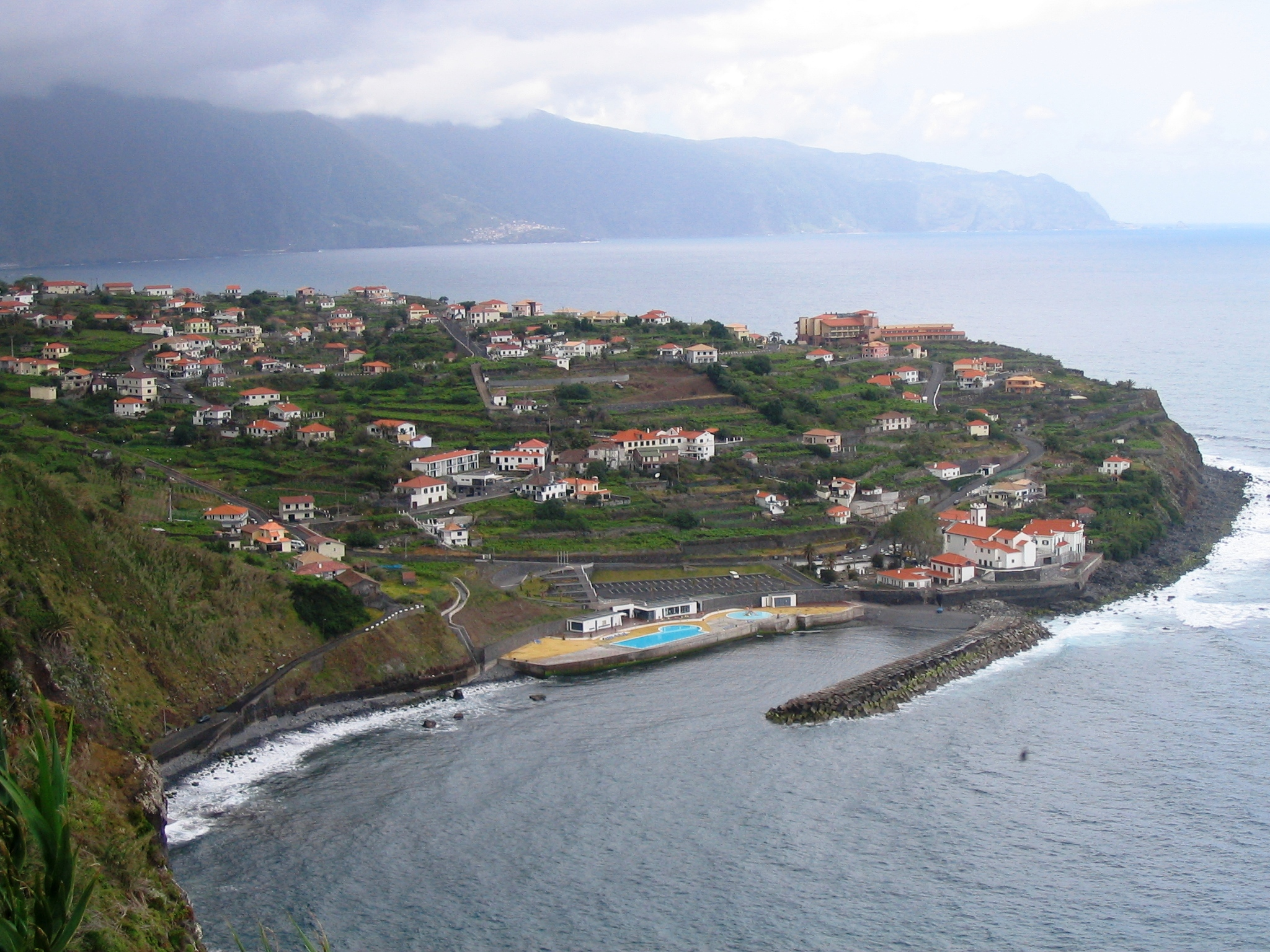

- Location in Madeira
- Coordinates: 32.825°N 16.989°W
- Country: Portugal
- Auton. region: Madeira
- Municipality: São Vicente

Area
  - Total: 9.39 km^{2} (3.63 sq mi)

Population (2011)
  - Total: 1,363
  - Density: 145/km^{2} (376/sq mi)
- Time zone: UTC+00:00 (WET)
  - Summer (DST): UTC+01:00 (WEST)

Ponta Delgada is a parish in the municipality of São Vicente on the island of Madeira. The population in 2011 was 1,363, in an area of 9.39 km^{2}. Ponta Delgada is located on the north coast, 2 km west of Boa Ventura and 6 km east of São Vicente.

== Climate ==
Climate data for Ponta Delgada, 1951-1980
Month	Jan	Feb	Mar	Apr	May	Jun	Jul	Aug	Sep	Oct	Nov	Dec	Year
Record high °C (°F)	26.9 (80.4)	27.3 (81.1)	30.5 (86.9)	25.5 (77.9)	30.0 (86.0)	27.4 (81.3)	30.1 (86.2)	31.3 (88.3)	33.5 (92.3)	33.4 (92.1)	28.2 (82.8)	27.6 (81.7)	33.5 (92.3)
Mean daily maximum °C (°F)	17.8 (64.0)	17.9 (64.2)	18.6 (65.5)	18.9 (66.0)	20.5 (68.9)	22.1 (71.8)	23.1 (73.6)	24.6 (76.3)	24.5 (76.1)	22.7 (72.9)	20.1 (68.2)	18.0 (64.4)	20.7 (69.3)
Daily mean °C (°F)	15.2 (59.4)	15.2 (59.4)	15.6 (60.1)	15.9 (60.6)	17.3 (63.1)	19.0 (66.2)	20.2 (68.4)	21.4 (70.5)	21.2 (70.2)	19.8 (67.6)	17.5 (63.5)	15.8 (60.4)	17.8 (64.1)
Mean daily minimum °C (°F)	12.6 (54.7)	12.4 (54.3)	12.6 (54.7)	12.9 (55.2)	14.1 (57.4)	15.9 (60.6)	17.4 (63.3)	18.2 (64.8)	17.9 (64.2)	16.8 (62.2)	14.9 (58.8)	13.6 (56.5)	14.9 (58.9)
Record low °C (°F)	7.6 (45.7)	9.3 (48.7)	8.3 (46.9)	8.7 (47.7)	10.3 (50.5)	12.2 (54.0)	13.6 (56.5)	12.1 (53.8)	14.2 (57.6)	12.0 (53.6)	10.8 (51.4)	8.0 (46.4)	7.6 (45.7)
Average precipitation mm (inches)	191.0 (7.52)	140.0 (5.51)	117.0 (4.61)	68.3 (2.69)	45.8 (1.80)	34.8 (1.37)	15.6 (0.61)	25.3 (1.00)	51.5 (2.03)	156.0 (6.14)	180.0 (7.09)	143.0 (5.63)	1,168.3 (46)
Average relative humidity (%)	78	77	76	76	78	78	77	78	80	80	79	77	78
Source: IPMA
