= São Vicente, Madeira =

São Vicente
- Municipality
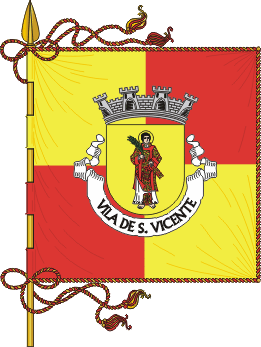
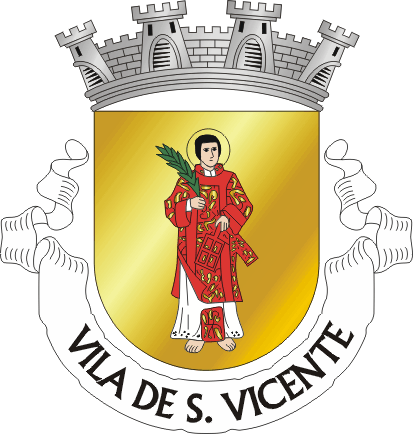
- Flag Coat of arms
- Interactive map of São Vicente
- Coordinates: 32°46′26″N 17°1′54″W
- Country: Portugal
- Auton. region: Madeira
- Island: Madeira
- Established: Settlement: fl. 1500; Municipality: c. 1744
- Parishes: 3

Government
  - President: José Carlos Gonçalves (CH)

Area
  - Total: 78.82 km^{2} (30.43 sq mi)
- Elevation: 379 m (1,243 ft)

Population (2011)
  - Total: 5,723
  - Density: 72.61/km^{2} (188.1/sq mi)
- Time zone: UTC+00:00 (WET)
  - Summer (DST): UTC+01:00 (WEST)
- Postal code: 9240-225
- Area code: 291
- Patron: Vicente de Saragoça
- Local holiday: 22 January
- Website: www.cm-saovicente.pt

São Vicente (Portuguese pronunciation: [sɐ̃w viˈsẽtɨ]) is a municipality along the north-west coast of the island of Madeira.

== History ==
The first human visitors to São Vicente appeared in the middle of the 15th century, colonizing the area much later than the settlers in the southern part of the island, owing to its fertility. This area of the island, due to its steep escarpments and deep river-valleys made early settlement difficult. The first settlers appeared in the areas of São Vicente and Ponta Delgada, respectively.

The progressive growth of its population led to dis-annexation of São Vicente from the Captaincy of Machico, and elevation to municipal seat by royal charter on 23 August 1774. At that time the parishes of Porto Moniz, Seixal, Arco de São Jorge and São Jorge where under the administration of the municipal authority.

In 1835, the restructuring of municipal government under the Liberal reformer Mouzinho da Silveira led to the creation of two new municipalities (Santana and Porto Moniz) along the northern coast of Madeira, which reduced the area of São Vicente. But, by 1867, under decree it reverted to its former dimensions. In 1898, with the re-establishment of the former municipalities São Vicente began to function within the current territorial area.

=== Legend ===
A legend exists that the toponymic name of the region, developed from an incident where Saint Vincent of Saragossa appeared in a rocky cove near the mouth of the river. Consequently, the settlers constructed a small chapel to the saint, owing to the great devotion to his personage.

== Monuments ==
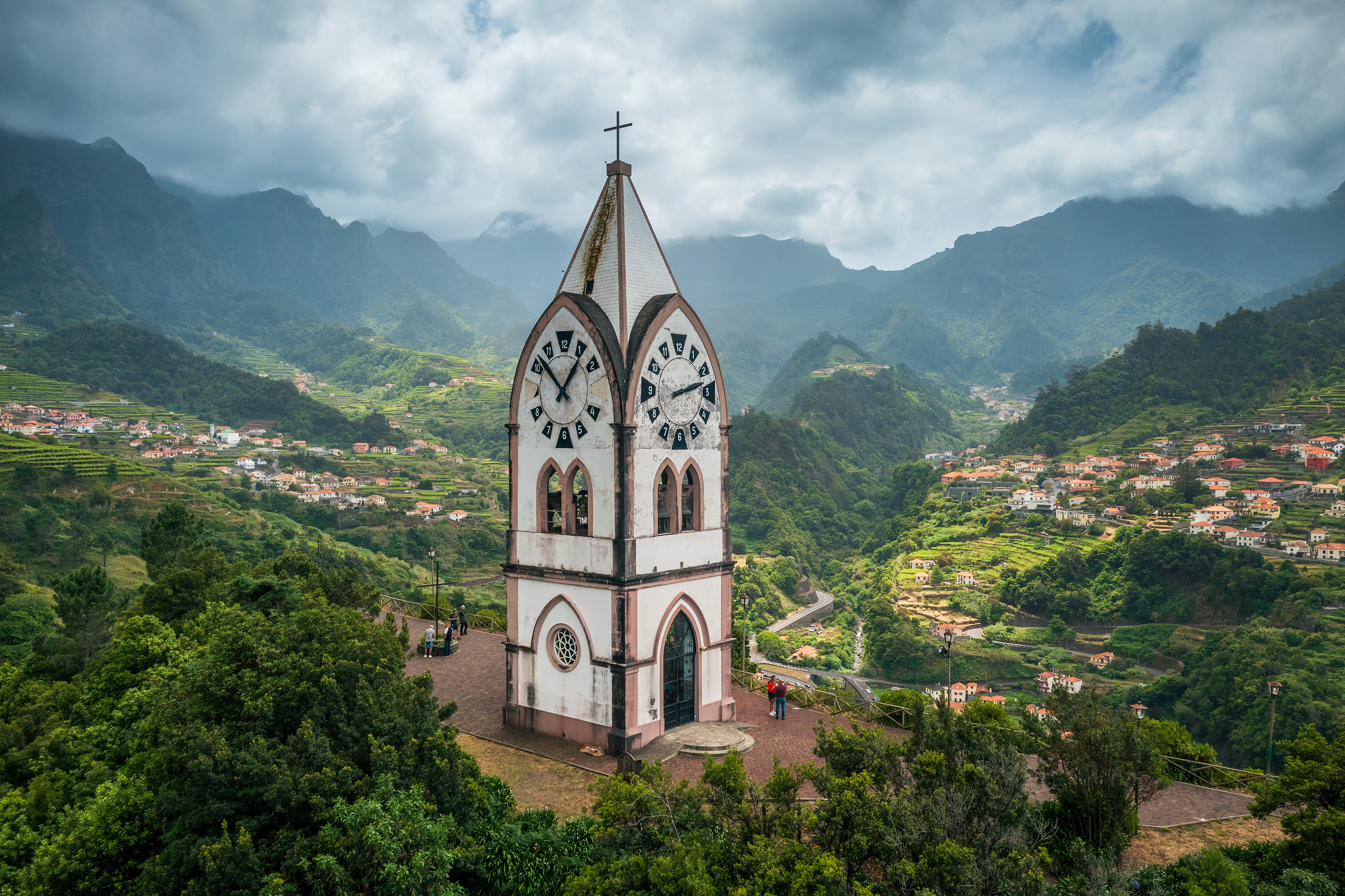
Capela de Nossa Senhora de Fátima

Nossa Senhora de Fátima Chapel is situated on the top of a hill, this small temple, whose façades are painted in white, contrasts with its green surroundings. Its unusual typology catches the eye: it is a quadrangular, tower-shaped building with a marked verticality, finished in a spire. When arriving to Nossa Senhora de Fátima Chapel, which can be accessed through a staircase, visitors are confronted with a striking landscape. On one side, the majesty of the mountains covered by a dense forest mantle, on the other, the immensity of the Atlantic Ocean. The scenery is completed with the typical houses that sprinkle the slopes.

This monument, considered an important part of the religious and cultural heritage of this region, was recently subject to a requalification process, where mainly elements linked to religious cult and its iconic bell mechanism were restored.

== Geography ==
São Vicente is located west of Santana and Machico and east of Porto Moniz, linked by roadway to Santana and the western part of the island. It is also home to the São Vicente Caves.

The municipality includes three civil parishes, that handle local government administration:

- Boaventura – physically the largest parish, but with the smallest population density, it is located in the northeast coast of the municipality, and ultimately the last to be settled;
- Ponta Delgada – a small parish, nestled between two promontories;
- São Vicente – the largest parish in population and density, home to the municipal seat; it had a population of 3,139 (in 2011) in an area of 44.14 km^{2}

== Climate ==
São Vicente has a very wet subtropical Mediterranean climate (Köppen: Csa) It has warm summers, with little to no precipitation, and mild, wet winters. The region, much like the rest of the Madeira is shaped by the Gulf Stream, and consequently has a narrow temperature variation. The climate can be divided into three main seasons: a warm and dry season spanning from June to August with average daily high temperatures ranging from 23 to 26 °C (73 to 79 °F), a warm and wet season from mid-September to November with average daily high temperatures ranging from 25 to 23 °C (77 to 73 °F) and a cooler wet season from December to April with average daily high temperatures ranging from 18 to 21 °C (64 to 70 °F). Humidity levels remain constantly high at about 75%. Sea temperatures range from a low of 18 °C (64 °F) in February–March to 24 °C (75 °F) in August–October.

The north coast of Madeira is generally about 1.0 °C (33.8 °F) cooler due to increased cloud cover and reduced sunshine. Average temperature and humidity data were compiled from IPMA records collected between 2012 and 2024. The weather station is located 1.5 km inland at 110 m above sea level, with temperatures decreasing on average by 0.65 °C per 100 m of altitude.

Climate data for São Vicente, 2012–2025, altitude: 97 m (318 ft)
Month	Jan	Feb	Mar	Apr	May	Jun	Jul	Aug	Sep	Oct	Nov	Dec	Year
Record high °C (°F)	26.6 (79.9)	28.6 (83.5)	25.7 (78.3)	27.7 (81.9)	26.6 (79.9)	30.0 (86.0)	29.3 (84.7)	31.2 (88.2)	30.8 (87.4)	36.4 (97.5)	28.6 (83.5)	27.8 (82.0)	36.4 (97.5)
Mean daily maximum °C (°F)	19.1 (66.4)	18.6 (65.5)	18.9 (66.0)	20.0 (68.0)	21.2 (70.2)	23.1 (73.6)	24.9 (76.8)	26.0 (78.8)	25.3 (77.5)	24.3 (75.7)	21.4 (70.5)	20.0 (68.0)	21.9 (71.4)
Daily mean °C (°F)	15.9 (60.6)	15.5 (59.9)	15.8 (60.4)	16.7 (62.1)	18.1 (64.6)	19.9 (67.8)	21.5 (70.7)	22.5 (72.5)	22.0 (71.6)	21.0 (69.8)	18.4 (65.1)	16.8 (62.2)	18.7 (65.6)
Mean daily minimum °C (°F)	12.1 (53.8)	11.6 (52.9)	11.8 (53.2)	12.4 (54.3)	13.9 (57.0)	15.6 (60.1)	17.0 (62.6)	17.9 (64.2)	17.6 (63.7)	17.1 (62.8)	14.7 (58.5)	13.1 (55.6)	14.6 (58.2)
Record low °C (°F)	7.3 (45.1)	7.6 (45.7)	7.4 (45.3)	8.7 (47.7)	9.9 (49.8)	12.2 (54.0)	13.5 (56.3)	15.2 (59.4)	13.8 (56.8)	12.3 (54.1)	9.9 (49.8)	8.7 (47.7)	7.3 (45.1)
Average precipitation mm (inches)	135.1 (5.32)	110.7 (4.36)	143.2 (5.64)	91.1 (3.59)	43.3 (1.70)	40.6 (1.60)	13.1 (0.52)	15.2 (0.60)	66.6 (2.62)	138.4 (5.45)	195.9 (7.71)	142.8 (5.62)	1,136 (44.73)
Average relative humidity (%)	79	76	77	79	78	78	77	77	78	79	81	78	78
Source: Instituto Português do Mar e da Atmosfera

Climate data for Miradouro, Ginjas, São Vicente, 2012–2025, altitude: 470 m (1,540 ft)
Month	Jan	Feb	Mar	Apr	May	Jun	Jul	Aug	Sep	Oct	Nov	Dec	Year
Mean daily maximum °C (°F)	16.8 (62.2)	16.1 (61.0)	16.3 (61.3)	17.3 (63.1)	18.4 (65.1)	20.4 (68.7)	22.0 (71.6)	23.2 (73.8)	22.5 (72.5)	22.0 (71.6)	19.1 (66.4)	17.8 (64.0)	19.3 (66.8)
Daily mean °C (°F)	13.0 (55.4)	12.6 (54.7)	12.9 (55.2)	13.7 (56.7)	15.0 (59.0)	16.8 (62.2)	18.5 (65.3)	19.5 (67.1)	18.8 (65.8)	18.2 (64.8)	15.5 (59.9)	14.0 (57.2)	15.7 (60.3)
Mean daily minimum °C (°F)	10.4 (50.7)	9.9 (49.8)	10.1 (50.2)	10.7 (51.3)	12.2 (54.0)	13.9 (57.0)	15.3 (59.5)	16.2 (61.2)	15.9 (60.6)	15.4 (59.7)	13.0 (55.4)	11.4 (52.5)	12.9 (55.2)
Record low °C (°F)	5.8 (42.4)	6.0 (42.8)	5.5 (41.9)	6.8 (44.2)	8.0 (46.4)	10.1 (50.2)	11.8 (53.2)	12.9 (55.2)	11.4 (52.5)	10.9 (51.6)	7.9 (46.2)	6.5 (43.7)	5.5 (41.9)
Average precipitation mm (inches)	164.6 (6.48)	191.1 (7.52)	222.6 (8.76)	147.4 (5.80)	81.7 (3.22)	30.6 (1.20)	9.1 (0.36)	11.8 (0.46)	88.4 (3.48)	142.3 (5.60)	146.6 (5.77)	266.4 (10.49)	1,502.6 (59.14)
Average relative humidity (%)	80	77	78	79	78	78	77	77	78	79	82	79	79
Source: Weather Underground - São Vicente, Madeira - IMADEIRA8

== Climate ==
Climate data for Ponta Delgada, 2012-2025
Month	Jan	Feb	Mar	Apr	May	Jun	Jul	Aug	Sep	Oct	Nov	Dec	Year
Record high °C (°F)	26.9 (80.4)	27.3 (81.1)	30.5 (86.9)	25.5 (77.9)	30.0 (86.0)	27.4 (81.3)	30.1 (86.2)	31.3 (88.3)	33.5 (92.3)	33.4 (92.1)	28.2 (82.8)	27.6 (81.7)	33.5 (92.3)
Mean daily maximum °C (°F)	18.7 (65.7)	18.8 (65.8)	19.5 (67.1)	19.8 (67.6)	21.4 (70.5)	23.0 (73.4)	24.0 (75.2)	25.5 (77.9)	25.4 (77.7)	23.6 (74.5)	21.0 (69.8)	18.9 (66.0)	21.7 (71.1)
Daily mean °C (°F)	16.0 (60.8)	16.0 (60.8)	16.4 (61.5)	16.7 (62.1)	18.1 (64.6)	19.8 (67.6)	21.0 (69.8)	22.2 (72.0)	22.0 (71.6)	20.6 (69.1)	18.3 (64.9)	16.6 (61.9)	18.6 (65.5)
Mean daily minimum °C (°F)	13.5 (56.3)	13.3 (55.9)	13.5 (56.3)	13.8 (56.8)	15.0 (59.0)	16.8 (62.2)	18.3 (64.9)	19.1 (66.4)	18.8 (65.8)	17.7 (63.9)	15.8 (60.4)	14.5 (58.1)	15.8 (60.4)
Record low °C (°F)	7.6 (45.7)	9.3 (48.7)	8.3 (46.9)	8.7 (47.7)	10.3 (50.5)	12.2 (54.0)	13.6 (56.5)	12.1 (53.8)	14.2 (57.6)	12.0 (53.6)	10.8 (51.4)	8.0 (46.4)	7.6 (45.7)
Average precipitation mm (inches)	191.0 (7.52)	140.0 (5.51)	117.0 (4.61)	68.3 (2.69)	45.8 (1.80)	34.8 (1.37)	15.6 (0.61)	25.3 (1.00)	51.5 (2.03)	156.0 (6.14)	180.0 (7.09)	143.0 (5.63)	1,168.3 (46.00)
Average relative humidity (%)	78	77	76	76	78	78	77	78	80	80	79	77	78
Source: Estimated update from 1951–1980 baseline based on regional North Atlantic warming trends

== Notable citizens ==
- Gregório Joaquim Diniz (c. 1863 – 1931) – doctor, Sub-Delegate for Health, and involved in the first hydro-electrical production facility on the island of Madeira, at Pé de Corrida.
