= Boaventura, São Vicente =

Boaventura
- Civil parish
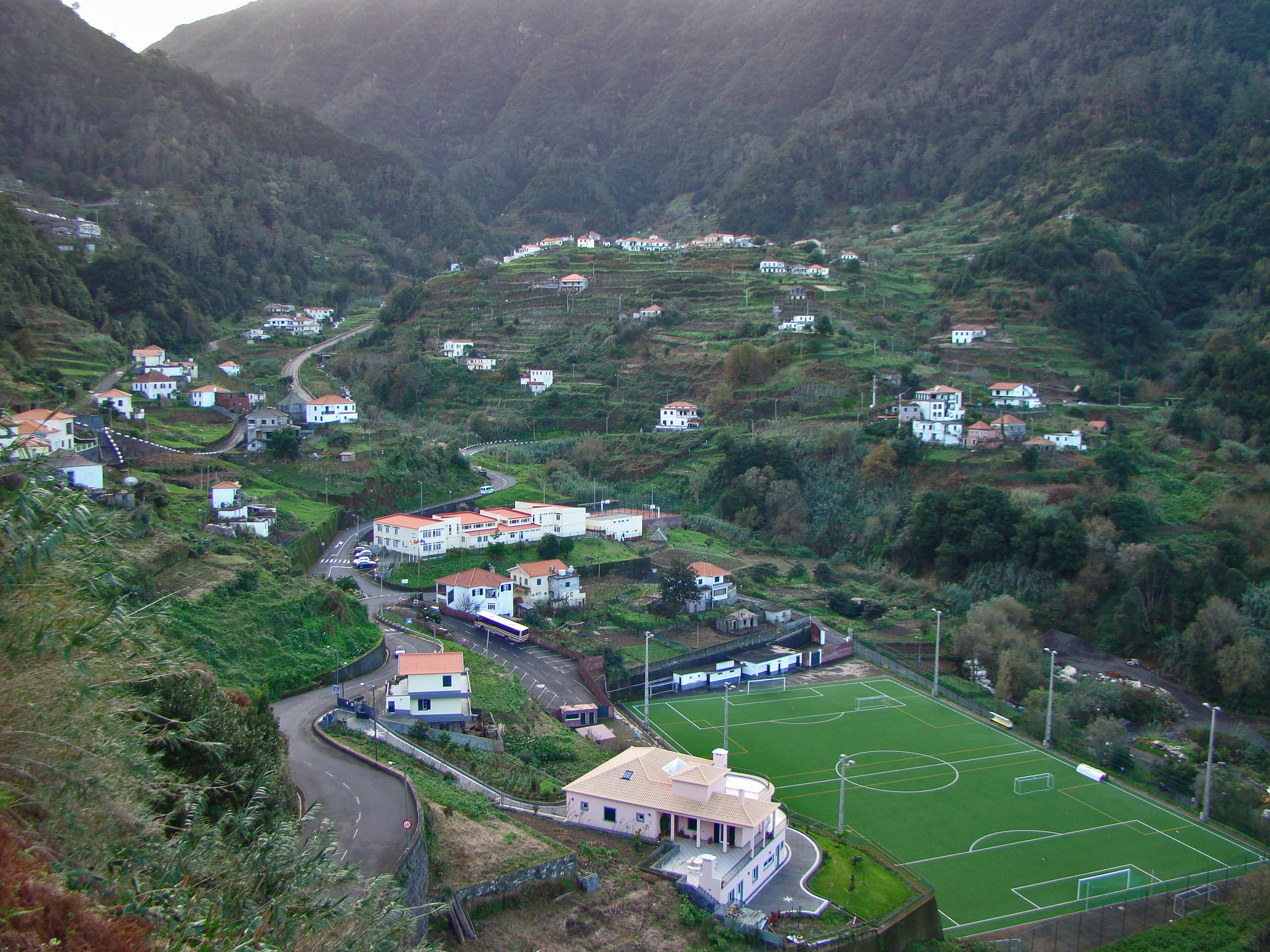
- The deep valley walls of the Ribeira da Boaventura

- Location in Madeira
- Coordinates: 32°47′31″N 16°58′23″W
- Country: Portugal
- Auton. region: Madeira
- Island: Madeira
- Municipality: São Vicente
- Established: Settlement: 4 February 1733; Parish: 18 November 1836

Area
  - Total: 25.30 km^{2} (9.77 sq mi)
- Elevation: 330 m (1,080 ft)

Population (2011)
  - Total: 1,221
  - Density: 48.26/km^{2} (125.0/sq mi)
- Time zone: UTC+00:00 (WET)
  - Summer (DST): UTC+01:00 (WEST)
- Postal code: 9240-028
- Area code: 291

Boaventura (Portuguese for Bonaventure) is a civil parish in the municipality of São Vicente in the Portuguese island of Madeira. The population in 2011 was 1,221, in an area of 25.30 km^{2}.

== History ==
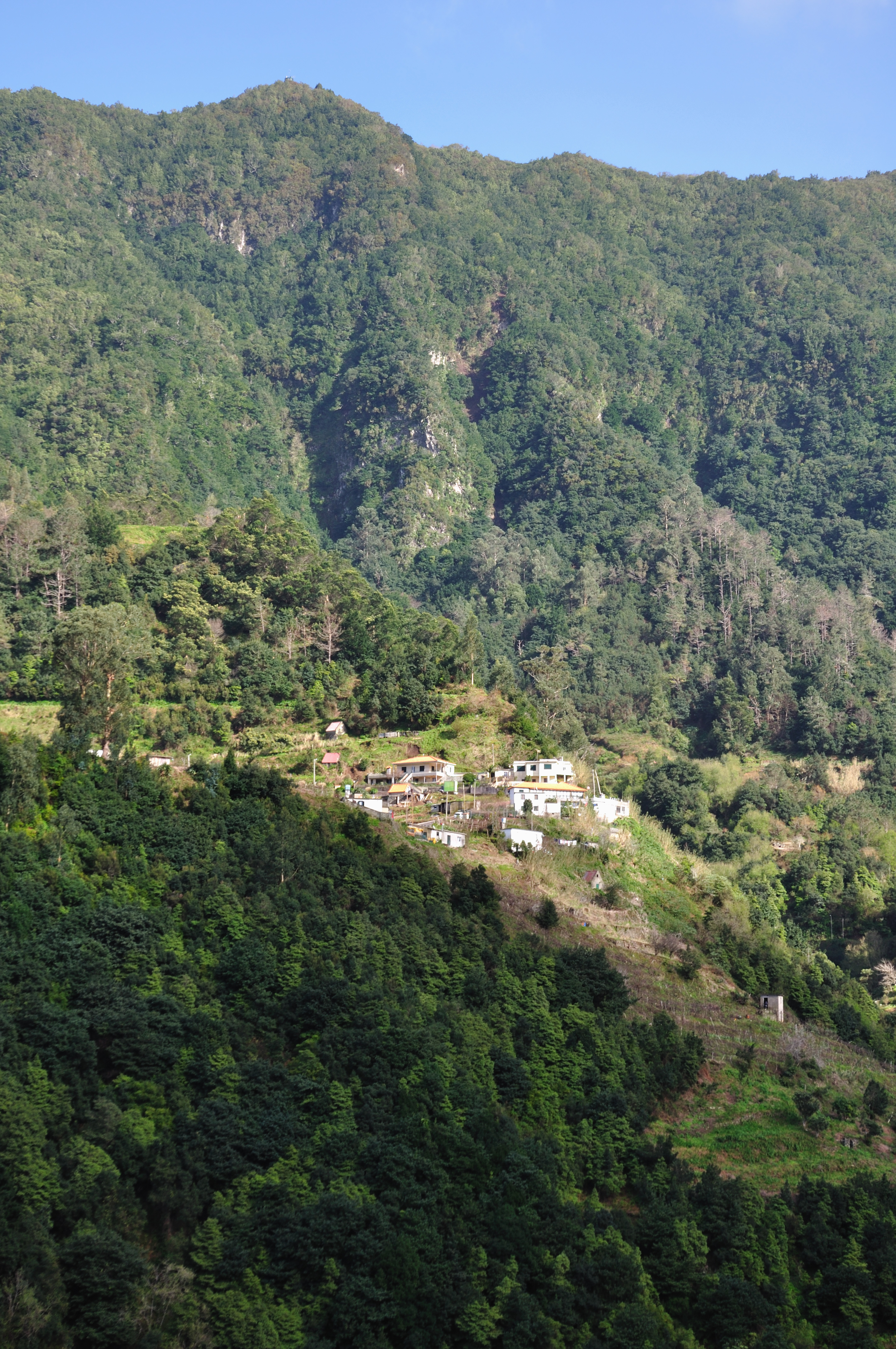
The valley wall that surrounds the parish of Boaventura

Boaventura was a recent settlement, on the road between the southern part of Madeira and Curral das Freiras; the oldest settler was Pedro Gomes Galdo in this location, acquiring lands and establishing a chapel to São Cristóvão (the place that still retains that name). From the Elucidário Madeirense, it is unclear as to the origins of the local toponymy (which is even absent from the parochial archive), in addition to the variation that exists: Boaventura or Boa Ventura. It is assumed that the first form is the much older designation, more common and the standard illiteration. By conjecture, it has been assumed that the name originate from a place on the continent, from the original settlers, although there exists no place in continental Portugal that uses the same name. Alberto Artur Sarmento, in Freguesias da Madeira, believes that the name came from the first settler, whose name was likely Boaventura. Regardless, the fact is that the name appears just before the middle of the 16th century, preceding the establishment of the ecclesiastical parish.

King John V of Portugal, by regal edict on 4 February 1733, authorized the creation of the ecclesiastical parish, while ignoring its jurisdiction and attributions. It was not until 18 November 1836, António Alfredo de Santa Catarina Braga, governor of the bishop and vicar, issued a charter that formally elevated the clergy to ecclesiastical parish, removing it totally from the jursidaiction of the parish of Ponta Delgada. The seat of this parish was the Chapel of Santa Quitéria, constructed in the place of Serrão in 1731 (and later constructed in 1835).

The lands of this parish belonged, for three centuries, to the civil parish of Ponta Delgada, only becoming independent in 1836. For a long time the lands were the domain of the hereditary estates of the Serrão and Silveira families, and more recently the Curado de Vasconcelos and Licio de Lagos.

In addition to the Chapel of Santa Quitéira, there already existed hermitages in São Cristóvão and Sant’Ana, and they were joined in 1918 by a chapel in the site of Fajã do Penedo, dedicated to the Coração Imaculado de Maria (Immculate Heart of Mary).

== Geography ==
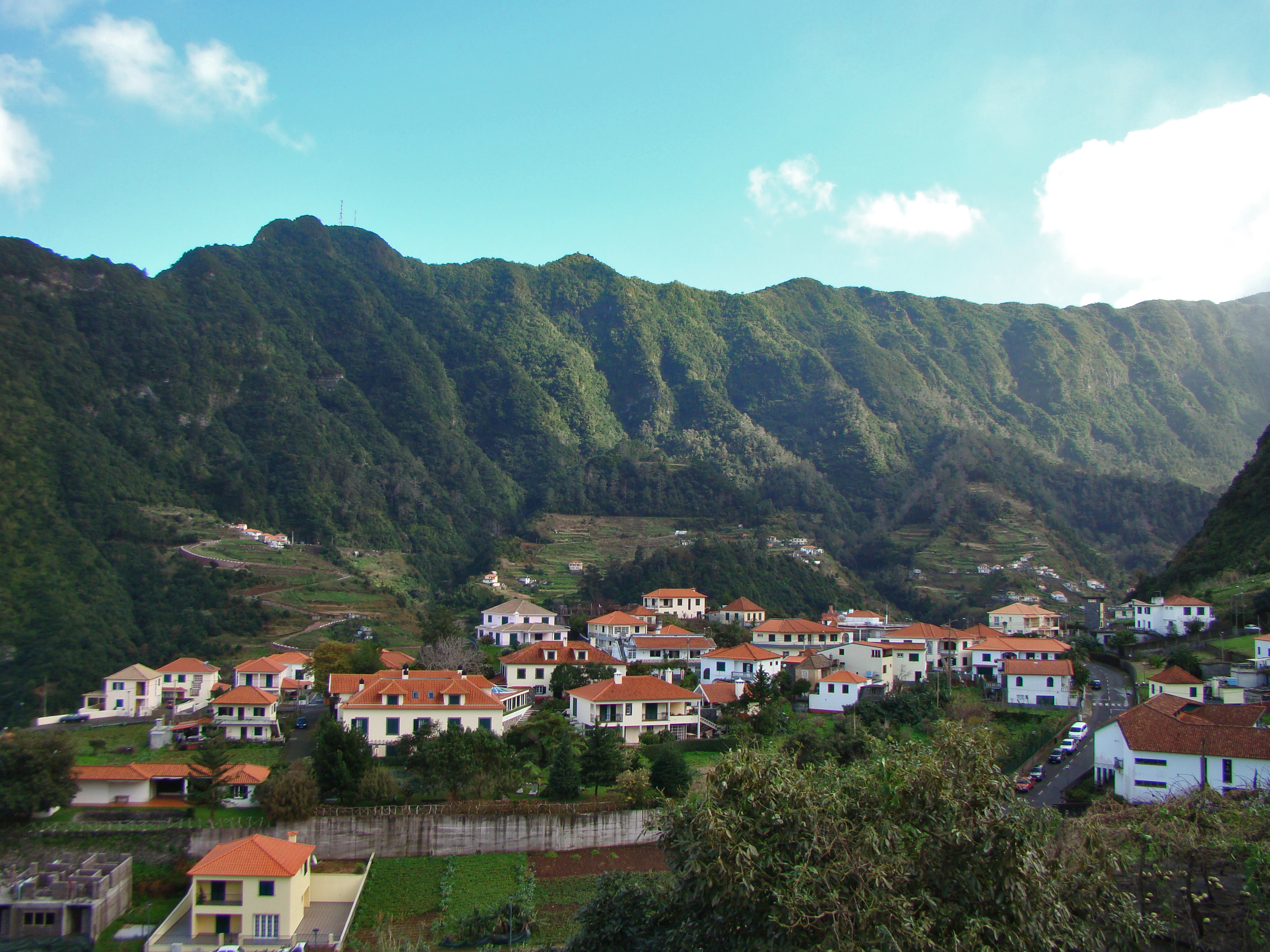
View of Boaventura

Located 9.5 kilometres east of the municipal seat (São Vicente), Boaventura is surrounded by the parishes of Arco de São Jorge, Ponta Delgada, São Vicente and Curral das Freiras, connected by the regional road that provides access to the western part of the island. The parish contains the localities Fajã do Penedo, Falca de Baixo, Falca de Cima, Santa Quitéira, Sant’Ana and São Cristivão.

The civil parish is crossed by the Levada da Achada Grande, Levada Grande, Levada das Faias, Levada da Achada, Levada dos Alves and Levada do Pastel, as well as the Levada da Achada (or Levada do Serrão), all of which have their origin in the Ribeira dos Moinhos.

A short distance from the coast are two islets, referred to as Ilhéu Porco and Ilhéu Vermelho, opposite the Ilhéu Preto (another islet) that fronts a steep vertical cliff.

The rugged escarpments divide the isolated settlements, such as Falca de Cima and Falca de Baixo, and it is served by a small port, at the mouth of the Ribeira da Boaventura, with its origin in the Serra das Torrinhas.

== Economy ==
In the locality of São Cristóvão there is a small roof-tile factory, utilizing the a dense clay, that is encountered in the region, and resistant to saltwater damage.
