= Curral das Freiras =

- Civil parish
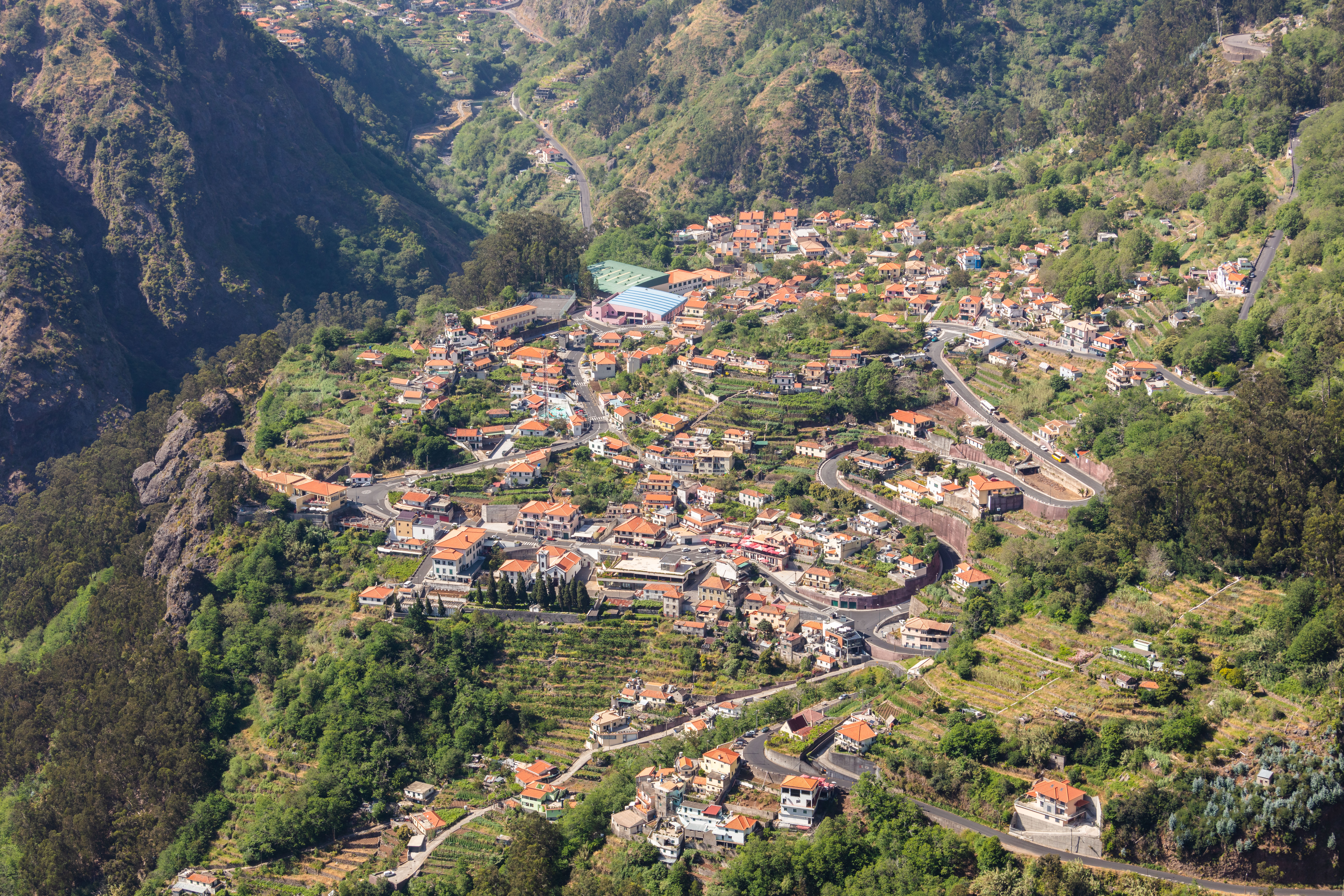

- Location in Madeira
- Coordinates: 32°43′12″N 16°58′11″W
- Country: Portugal
- Auton. region: Madeira
- Island: Madeira
- Municipality: Câmara de Lobos
- Established: Settlement: c. 1462; Civil parish: 17 March 1790

Area
  - Total: 25.03 km^{2} (9.66 sq mi)
- Elevation: 461 m (1,512 ft)

Population (2011)
  - Total: 2,001
  - Density: 79.94/km^{2} (207.1/sq mi)
- Time zone: UTC+00:00 (WET)
  - Summer (DST): UTC+01:00 (WEST)
- Postal code: 9030-319
- Area code: 291
- Patron: Nossa Senhora do Livramento
- Website: www.jf-curraldasfreiras.pt

Curral das Freiras ("Pen of the Nuns") is a civil parish in the municipality of Câmara de Lobos in the Portuguese archipelago of Madeira. The population in 2011 was 2,001, in an area of 25.03 km^{2}. It is situated in the mountainous interior of the island. Being one of the more distant locations from the municipal seat of Câmara de Lobos, it is geographically isolated from other communities by the cliffs and peaks surrounding its central valley. A tunnel southwards in the direction of Funchal, which opened in 2004, now offers safe access to the valley and the dangerous historical route has been abandoned.

== History ==
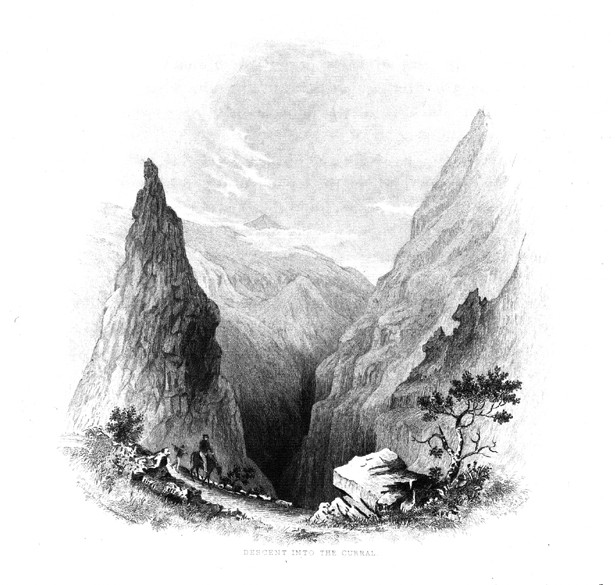
Charles Wilkes (1798-1877) - Descent into the Curral das Freiras - Narrative of the United States Exploring Expedition during the years 1838, 1839, 1840, 1841, 1842. Volume 1, 1845

Initially, during its early settlement access to the valley of Curral was difficult, and was only attempted by semi-nomadic shepherds and slaves who gained their emancipation or escaped from servitude. These people built small homes, and a small hamlet developed towards the end of the 15th century. More permanent residents began to dwell in the valley shortly after, although the area remained little developed.

The settlement was part of the dominion of João Gonçalves Zarco, who granted its use for cultivation around 1462 to João Ferreira and his wife Branca Dias. These settlers later donated their lands to their grandchild Branca Teixeira, on 22 August 1474. On 11 September 1480, the lands were, once again, sold to the second Captain-Donatário, João Gonçalves da Câmara (Zarco's son), who in turn donated it the Convento of Santa Clara in the name of his daughter Elvira and Joana who lived in the convent.

During early colonization, the settlement was simply known as Curral or Curral da Serra (English: corral or English: corral of the mountains), because it was known for its extensive pasture-lands, used for grazing cattle and small herds (sheep and goats). The name was subsequently altered, when these lands became the property of the nuns of the Convent of Santa Clara (between 1492 and 1497). There is also some discrepancy; others credit the name change after 1566, when the nuns of the Convent took refuge on these properties, during the French privateer attacks on Funchal.

The lands of Curral das Freiras were part of the parish of Santo António, but, owing to its extreme isolation from this ecclesiastical seat, the religious parish of Curral das Freiras was instituted in 1780. Later, on 17 March 1790, by regal charter (from Queen Maria I, Curral das Freiras became an independent parish, separating from Santo António.

== Geography ==
Situated in a deep valley and encircled by steep mountain slopes, the parish of Curral das Freiras is located 29 kilometres from the municipal seat of Câmara de Lobos. Most of the buildings in the parish overlook the main valley, with the steep hillsides encircling the parish used for the cultivation of cherries and grapes used in the production of Madeira wine.

== Architecture ==
Although rich in architectural heritage, the national architectural registry in Portugal is currently reviewing the status of the following as a national monument:

- Thermoelectric Centre of Curral das Freiras (Portuguese: Central Térmica no Curral das Freiras), designed by architect Raul Chorão Ramalho, the industrial structure was projected in 1964.

== Culture ==
The parish's patron seat is Nossa Senhora do Livramento (English: Our Lady of Alleviation), and annually the parish celebrates a festival in Her honor on the last Sunday of August.
