= Brava =

Brava or La Brava may refer to:

== Arts and entertainment ==
- Brava (Brodinski album), 2015
- Brava (Lali album), 2018
- Brava, an album by Rebeca, 2000
- Brava!, an album by Paulina Rubio, 2011
- "Brava" (song), by Mina, 1965
- La Brava (novel), by Elmore Leonard, 1983
- La Brava, a My Hero Academia character

== People ==
- Carta Brava Jr. (Sergio Marca, born 1987), Mexican professional wrestler
- Linda Brava (Linda Magdalena Cullberg Lampenius, born 1970), Finnish violinist
- Taiga Brava (Julio Iván Lemus Huerta, born 1992), Mexican drag queen

== Places ==
- Brava, Cape Verde, an island
  - Brava (volcano)
- Brava, Costa Rica, an island
- Barawa, or Brava, a town in Somalia
- Laguna Brava, in Guatemala
- La Brava Lake, Argentina
- La Brava, a town in San Javier Department, Santa Fe, Argentina

== Transportation ==
- Vauxhall Brava and Bedford Brava, variants of the Isuzu Faster pickup truck
- Fiat Brava, or Type 182, a small family car
- Fiat 131, sold in the United States as Fiat Brava
- Brava Linhas Aéreas, a former Brazilian domestic airline

== Other uses ==
- Brava, a beer brand of Bavaria Brewery in Colombia
- Stingray Brava, a former TV channel in the Netherlands

== See also ==
- Braava, an iRobot brand of floor cleaning devices
- Costa Brava, a coastal area of Spain
- Playa La Brava, a beach in Atlántida, Uruguay
- Praia Brava, a beach located on Santa Catarina Island, Brazil
- Ribeira Brava (disambiguation)
