= Tabua (disambiguation) =

Tabua is a polished sperm whale tooth, an important cultural item in Fijian society.

Tabua or Tábua may also refer to:

- Tabua, Madeira, a parish in the district of Ribeira Brava
- Tábua Municipality, Coimbra District, Portugal
- Tabūʿa, queen of Qedar
