= Brava Island =

Brava Island may refer to the following places:

- Brava, Cape Verde
- Brava, Costa Rica

== See also ==
- Isla brava, a 1958 Argentine film
