= Ribeira Brava =

Ribeira Brava may refer to:

- Ribeira Brava, Cape Verde, a town on the island of São Nicolau, Cape Verde
- Ribeira Brava, Cape Verde (municipality), a municipality on the island of São Nicolau, Cape Verde
- Ribeira Brava, Madeira, a municipality on the island of Madeira, Portugal
  - Ribeira Brava (parish), a parish of the municipality
