= Ribeira Brava (parish) =

- Civil parish
- Location in Madeira
- Coordinates: 32.671°N 17.064°W
- Country: Portugal
- Auton. region: Madeira
- Municipality: Ribeira Brava

Area
  - Total: 18.48 km^{2} (7.14 sq mi)

Population (2011)
  - Total: 6,588
  - Density: 360/km^{2} (920/sq mi)
- Time zone: UTC+00:00 (WET)
  - Summer (DST): UTC+01:00 (WEST)

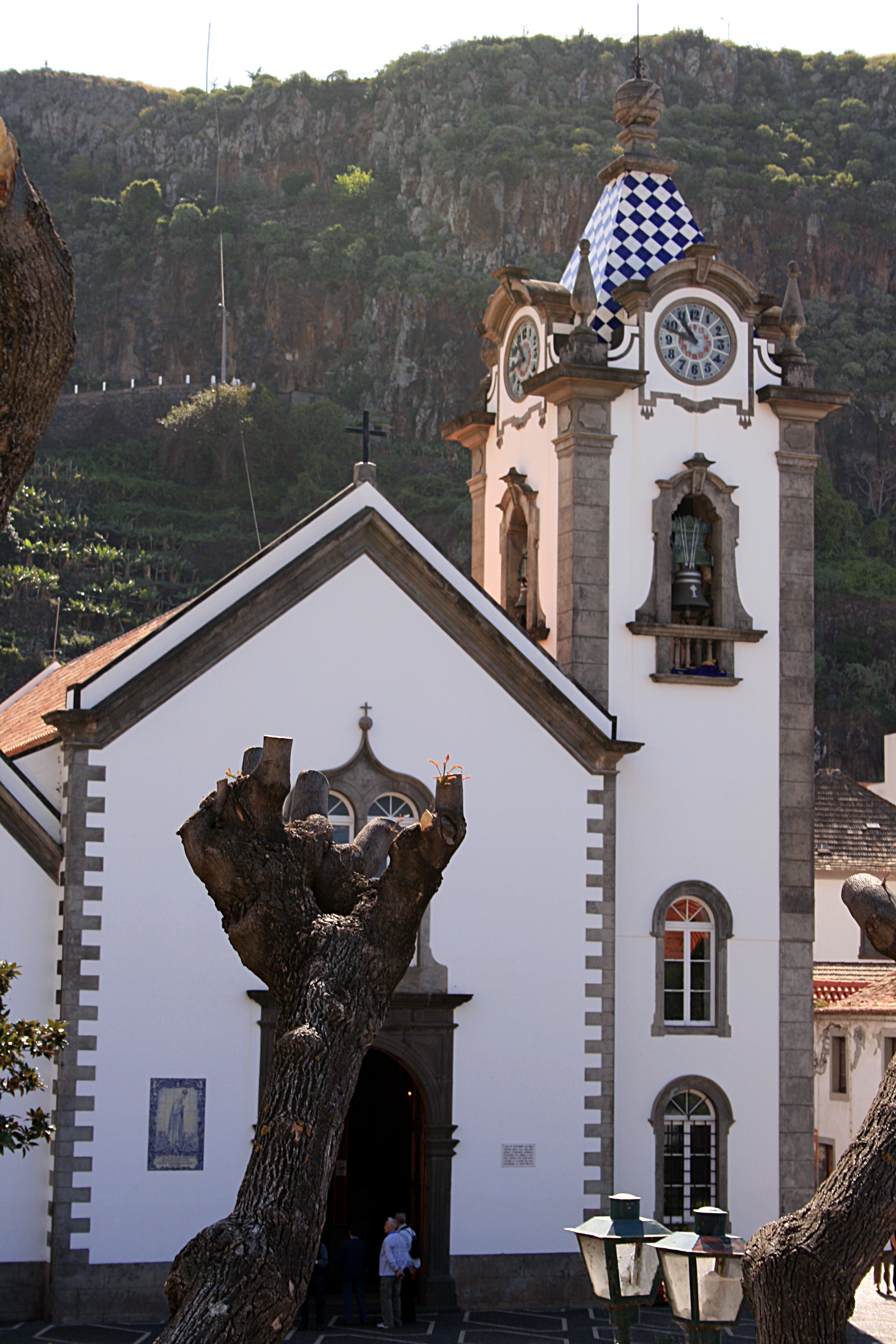
Church of São Bento

Ribeira Brava (Portuguese pronunciation: [ʁiˈβɐjɾɐ ˈβɾavɐ]) is the name of a parish in the west-central part of Madeira, Portugal. It is part of the municipality of Ribeira Brava. It is located on the south coast of the island, 14 km west of Funchal. The population in 2011 was 6,588, in an area of 18.48 km^{2}.
