= Ribeira Brava, Madeira =

Ribeira Brava
- Municipality
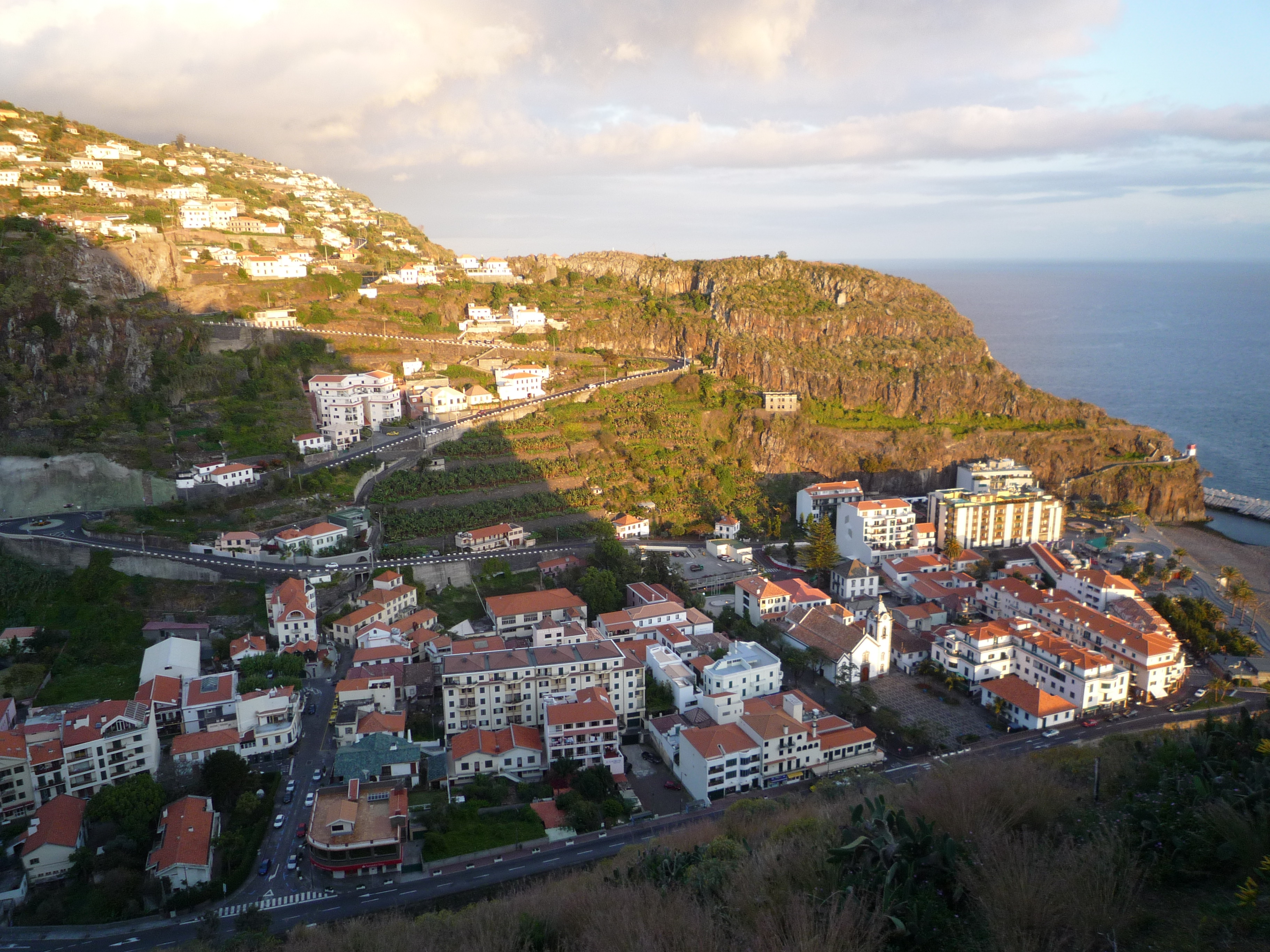
- Main centre of Ribeira Brava along the valley of the same name, and at the coast

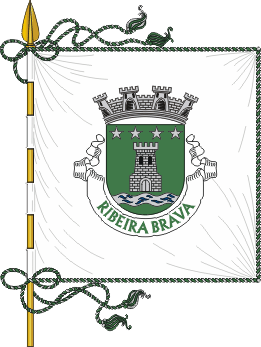
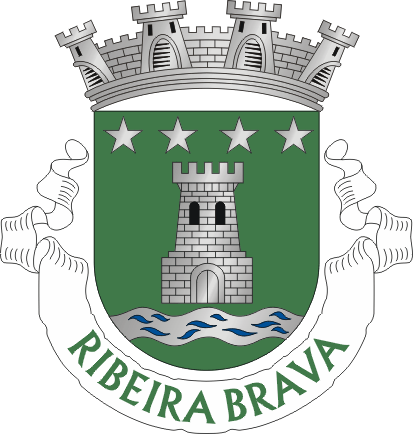
- Flag Coat of arms
- Interactive map of Ribeira Brava
- Coordinates: 32°41′N 17°3′W
- Country: Portugal
- Auton. region: Madeira
- Island: Madeira
- Established: Settlement: c.1500 Municipality: 6 May 1914
- Parishes: 4

Government
  - President: Ricardo Nascimento

Area
  - Total: 65.41 km^{2} (25.25 sq mi)

Population (2011)
  - Total: 13,375
  - Density: 204.5/km^{2} (529.6/sq mi)
- Time zone: UTC+00:00 (WET)
  - Summer (DST): UTC+01:00 (WEST)
- Postal code: 9350
- Area code: (+351) 291 XXX-XXXX
- Patron: São Bento
- Local holiday: 29 June
- Website: https://www.cm-ribeirabrava.pt

Ribeira Brava (Portuguese pronunciation: [ʁiˈβɐjɾɐ ˈβɾavɐ]; lit. 'Angry River') is a municipality on the island of Madeira, in the Portuguese Autonomous Region of Madeira. It is located along the southern coast (approximately centre), and is west of Câmara de Lobos and the regional capital Funchal, south of São Vicente, and east of Ponta do Sol. The population in 2011 was 13,375, in an area of 65.41 km^{2}.

The municipality gained its name due to its river, which translates as "angry river". In rainy seasons, the river had an extremely strong and powerful current, that often wreaked havoc over the entire eight kilometres of the route.

== Geography ==
The municipality's namesake, the Ribeira Brava ravine and river valley extends from the slopes of the west-central mountains of Madeira. Its waters provide the primary sources of drinking-water (a small reservoir collects surface run-off) to the area and electricity to the island of Madeira. Approximately ten tributaries feed this river, whose course ends in the Serra de Água and which much later empties into the Atlantic along the village's coast.

The primary urban agglomerations are the four civil parishes, constituted with their own local government. They include:

- Campanário
- Ribeira Brava
- Serra de Água
- Tabua

== Buildings and structures ==
The Centro Desportivo da Madeira stadium is located in the municipality.

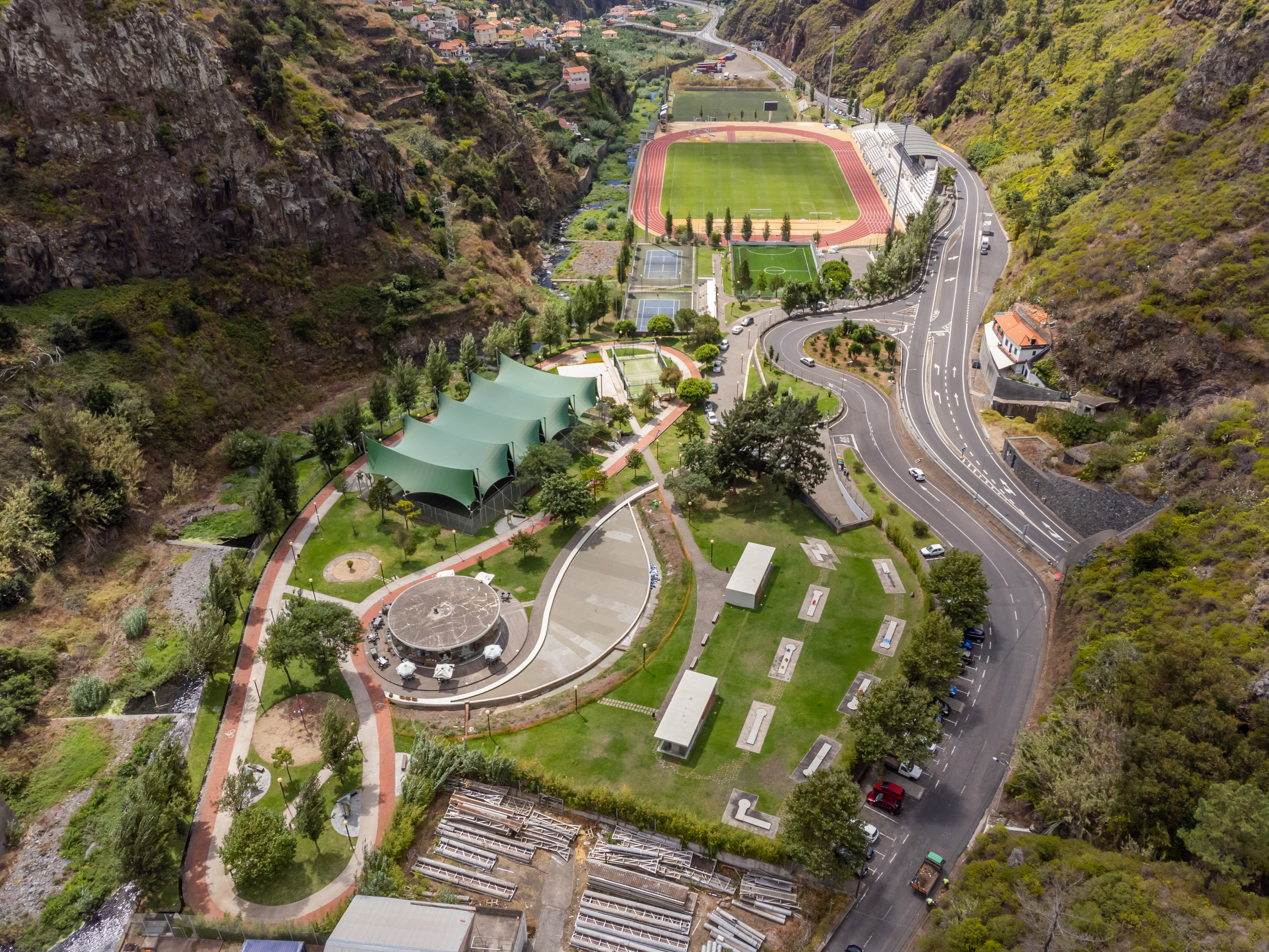

== Notable people ==
- Nadia Almada (born 1977 in Ribeira Brava) a transgender British TV personality; won the fifth series of Big Brother.
- Marquinho (born 1989 in Ribeira Brava) a footballer with over 250 club caps

== Gallery ==
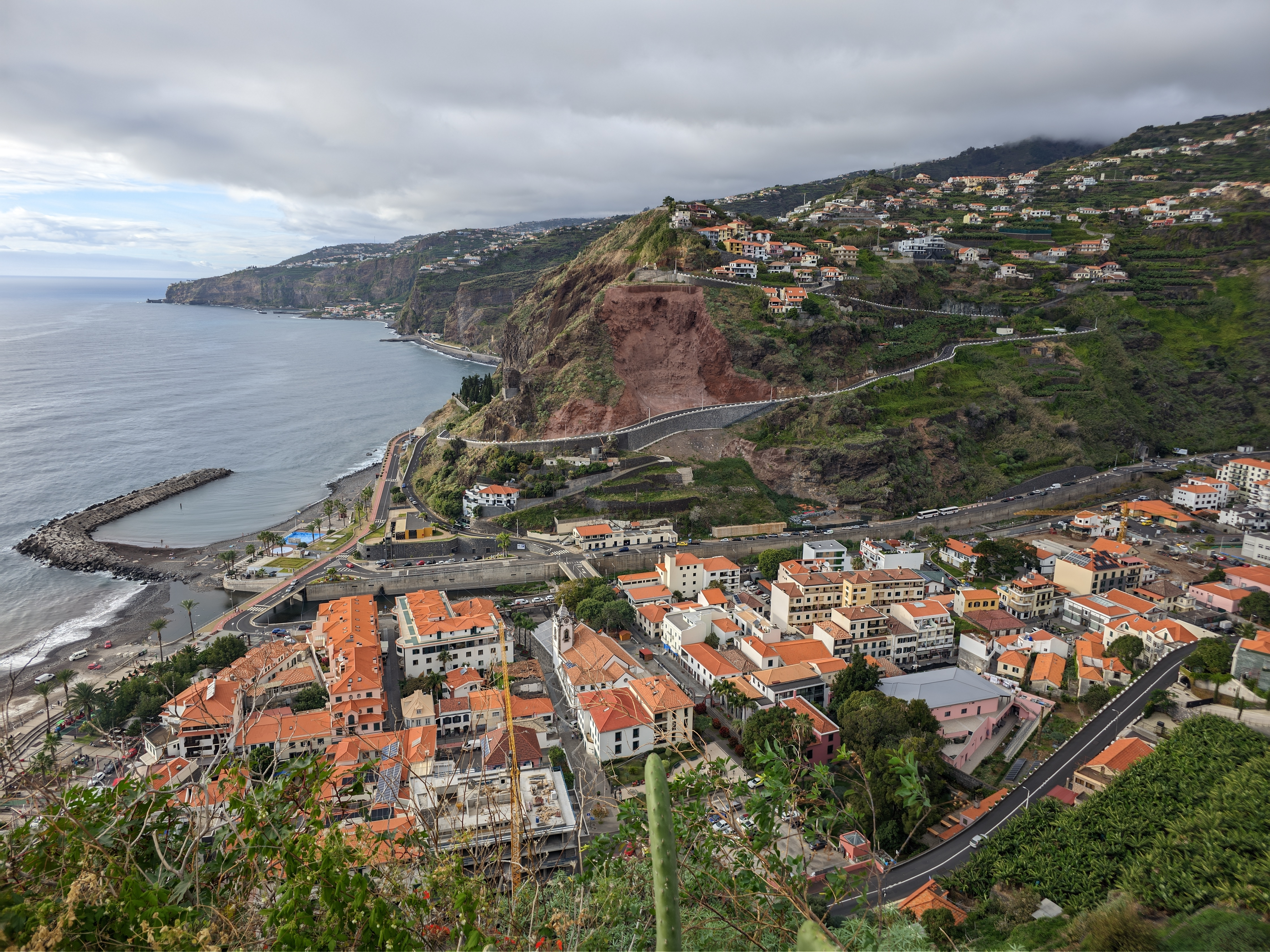
Ribeira Brava, from São Sebastião viewpoint

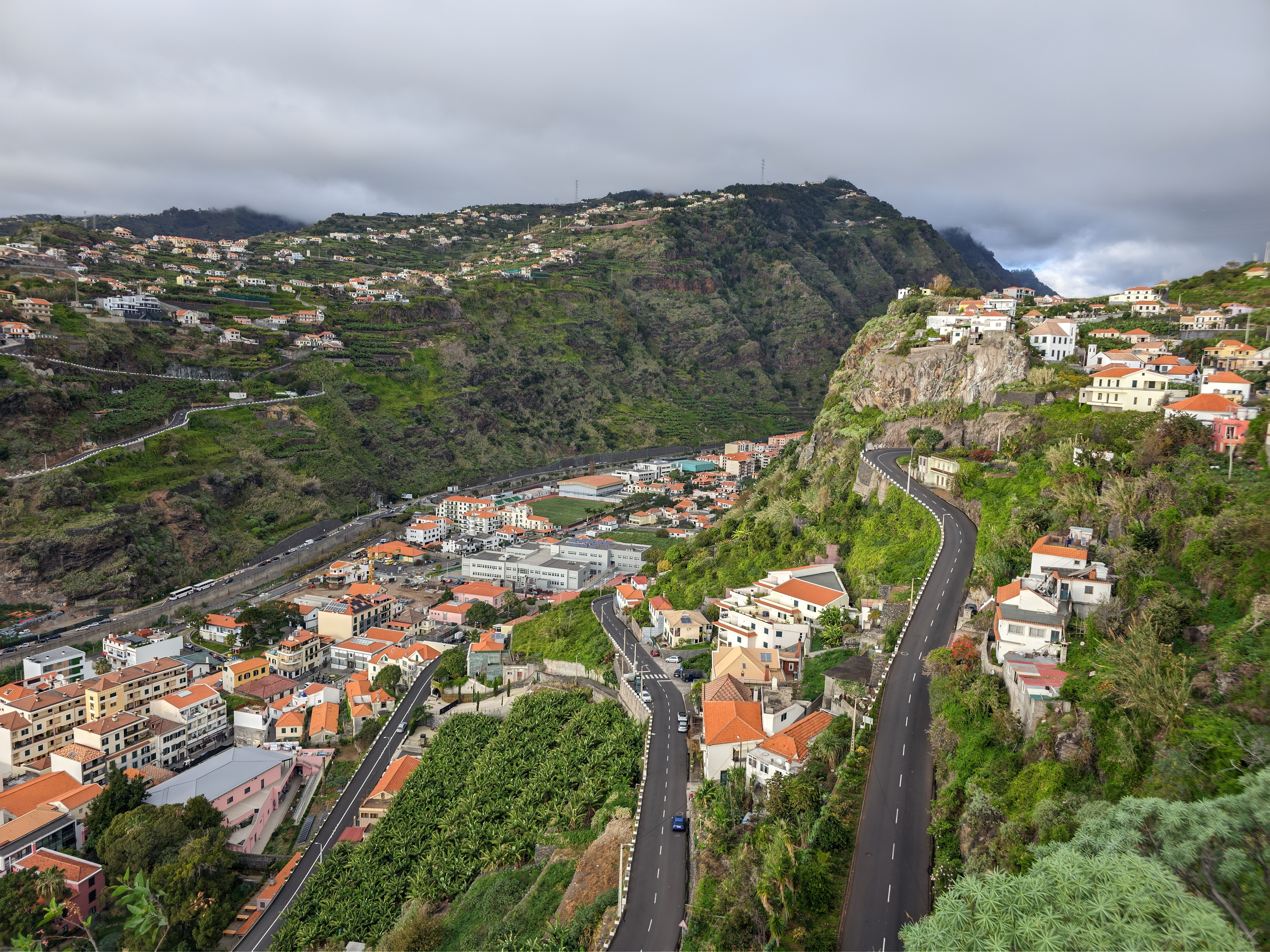
Ribeira Brava, from São Sebastião viewpoint

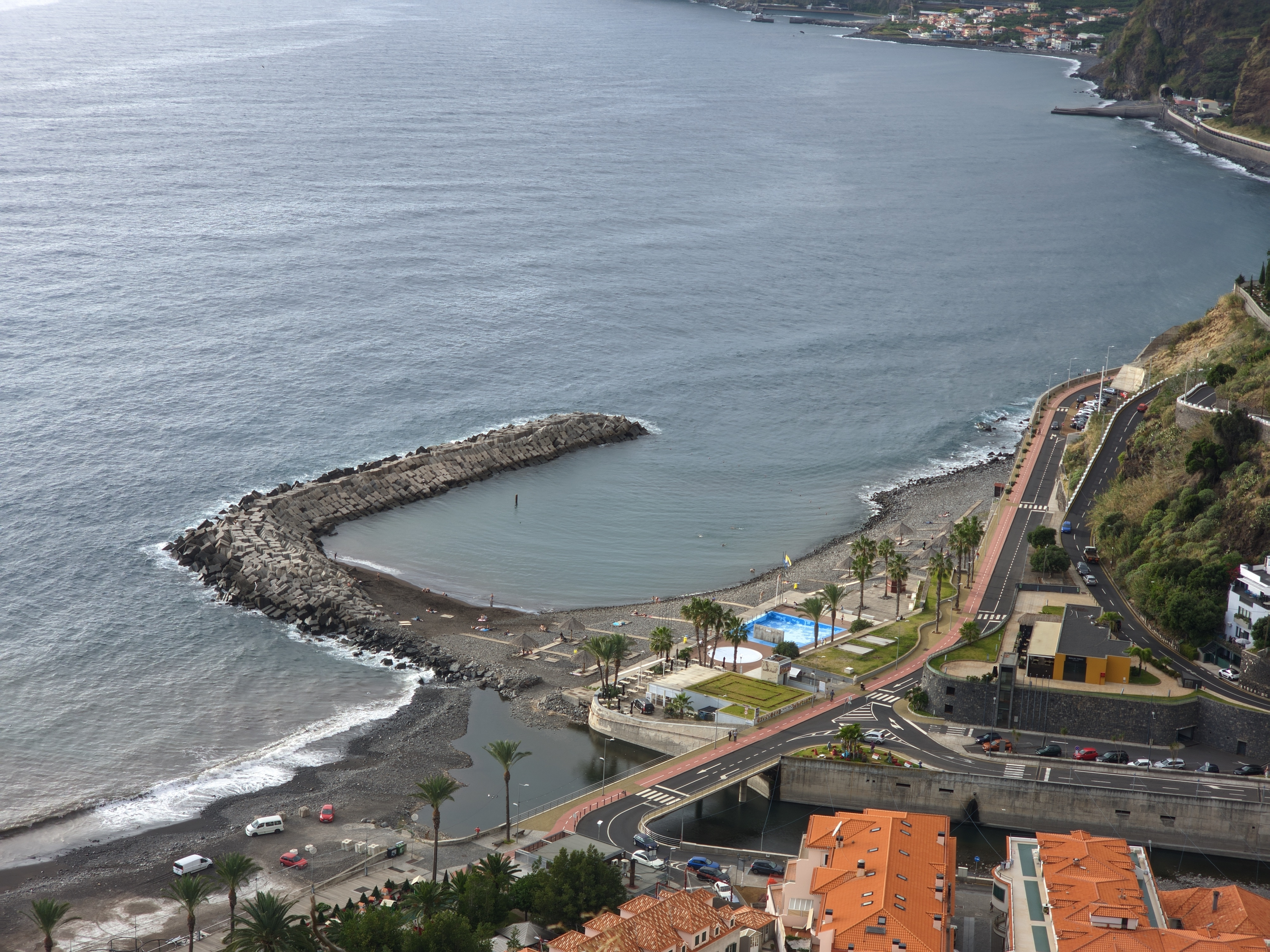
Beach, seen from São Sebastião viewpoint

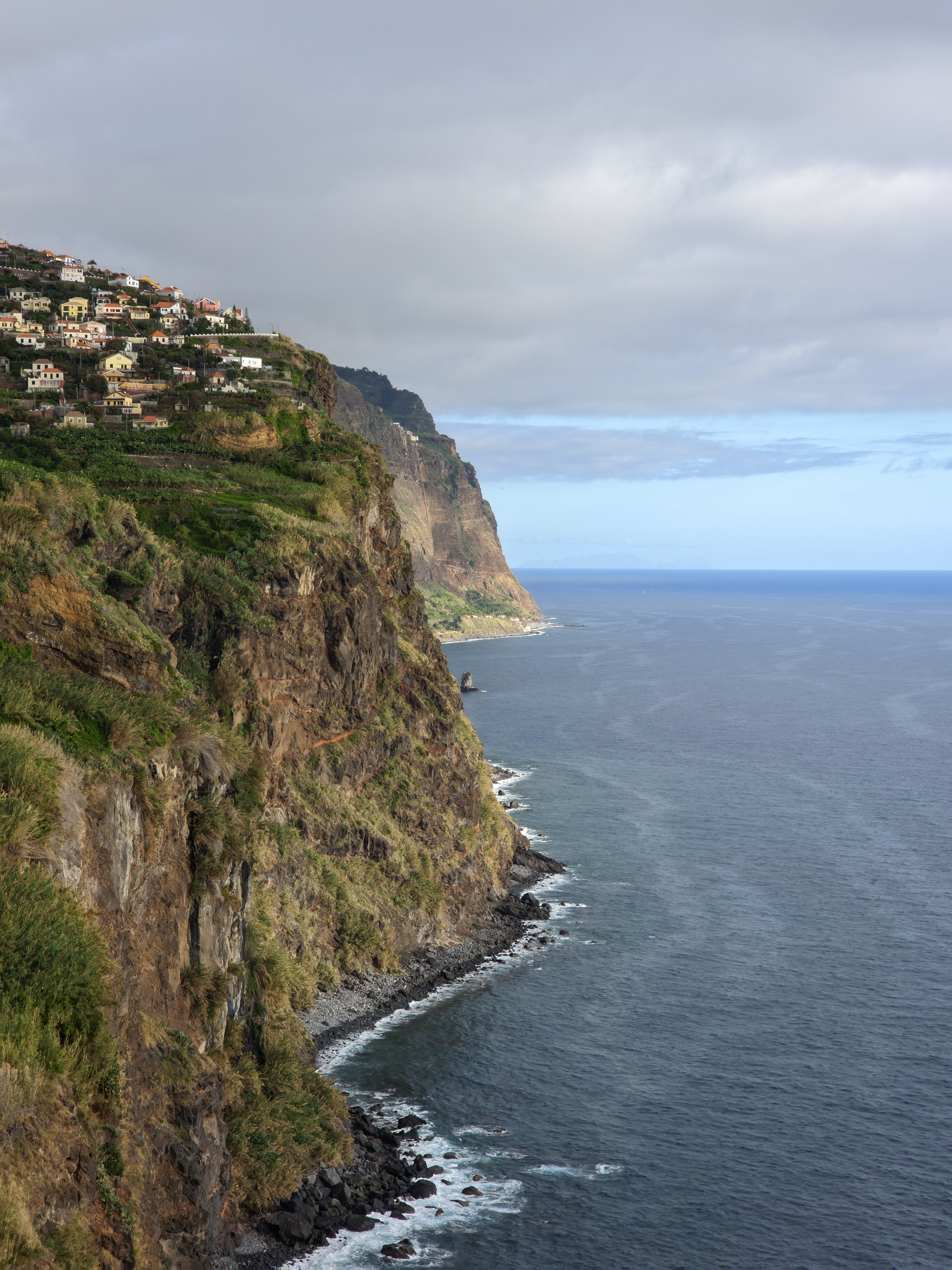
Ribeira Brava, from São Sebastião viewpoint, looking east

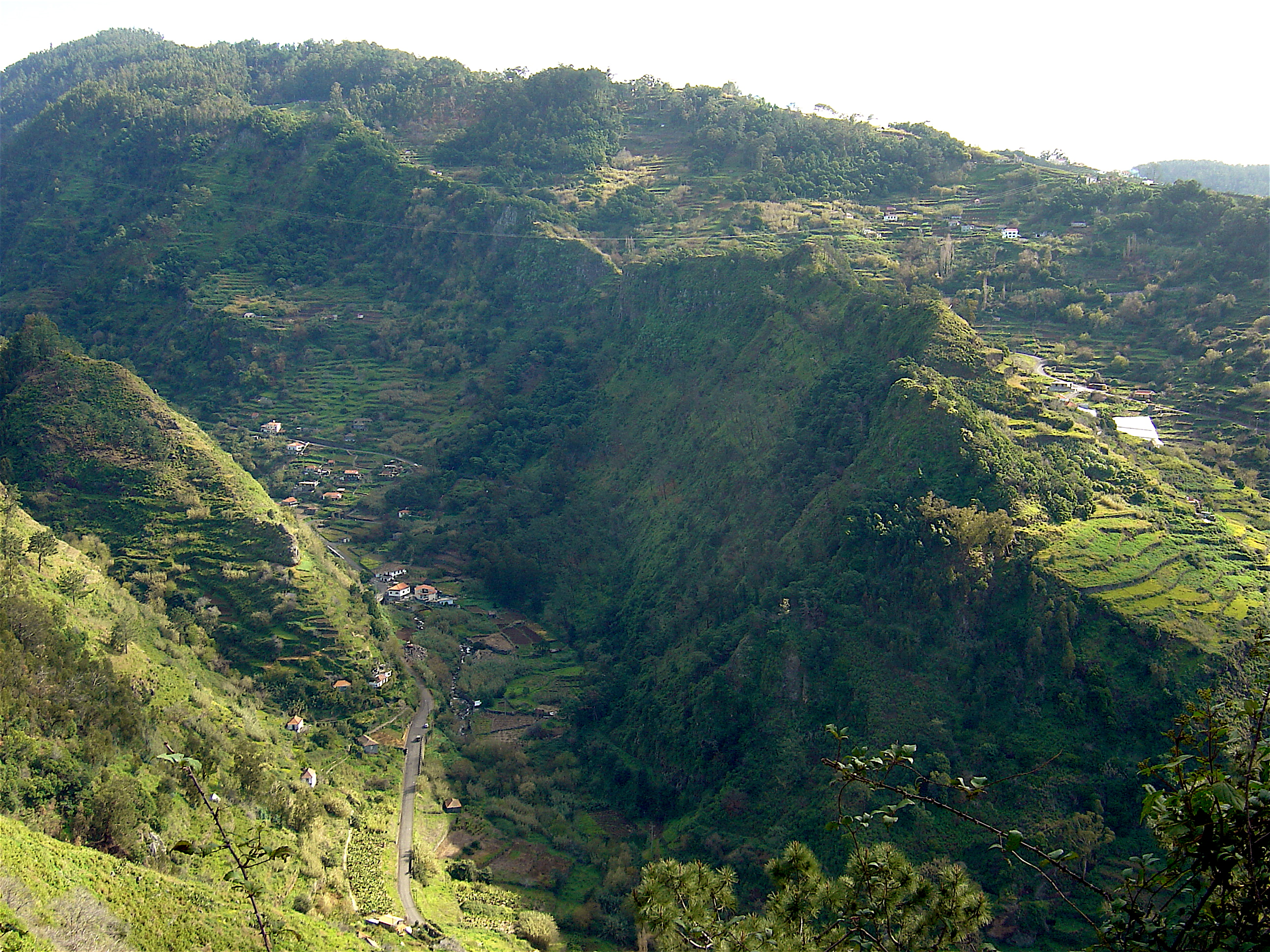
The village of Tabua over one of the tributaries of the Ribeira Brava ravine

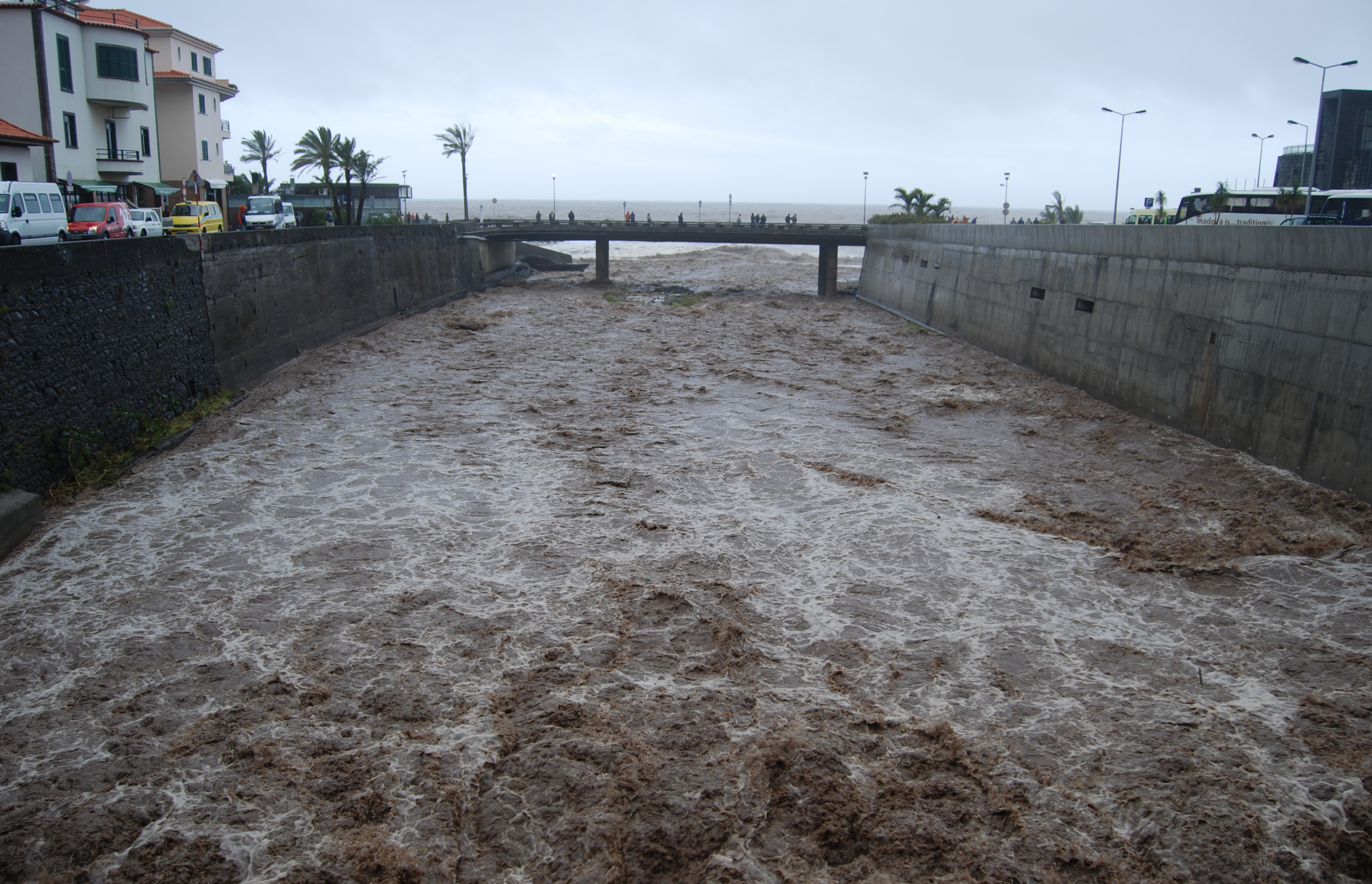
The Ribeira Brava river, living up to its name, Angry river

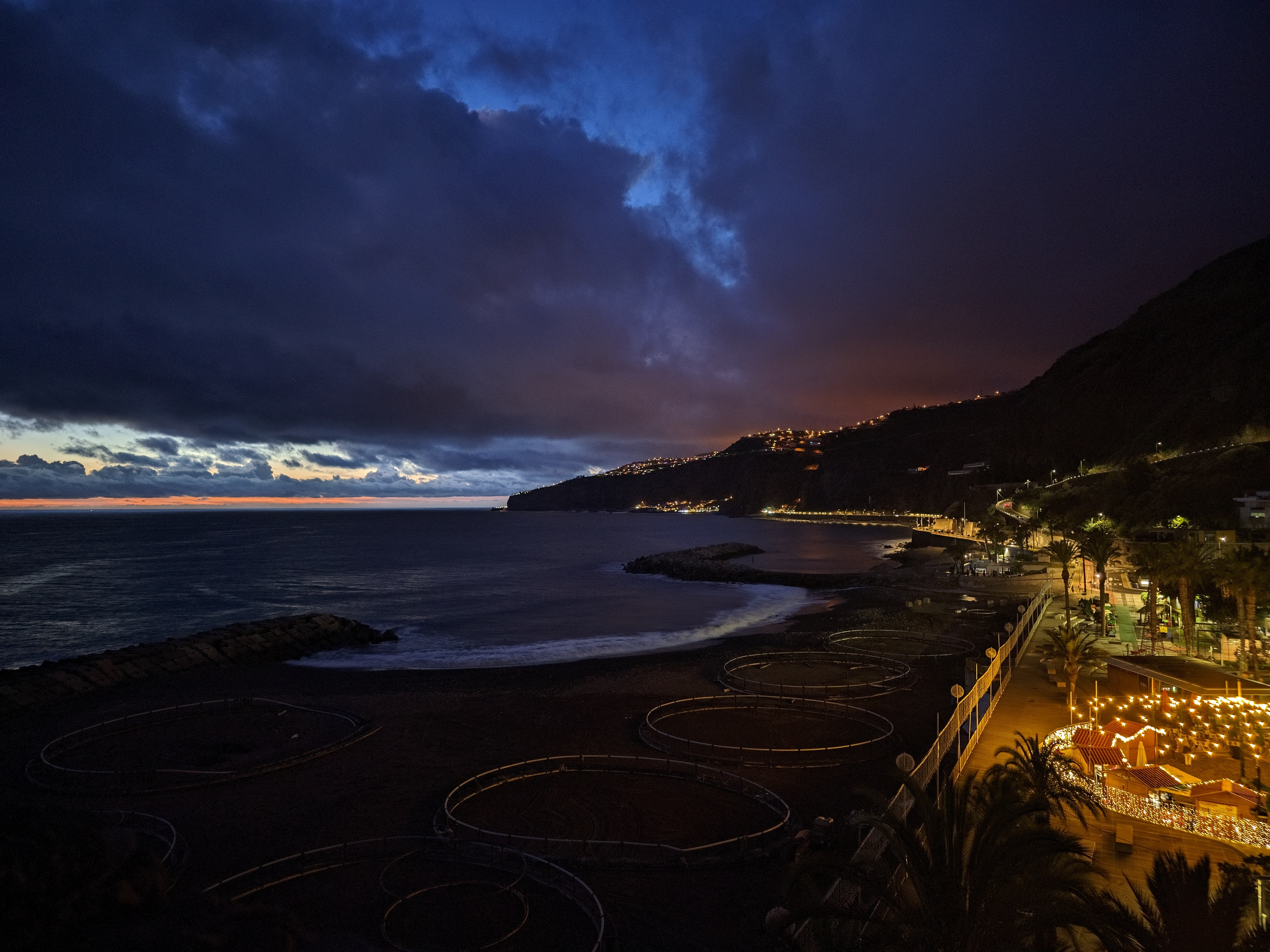

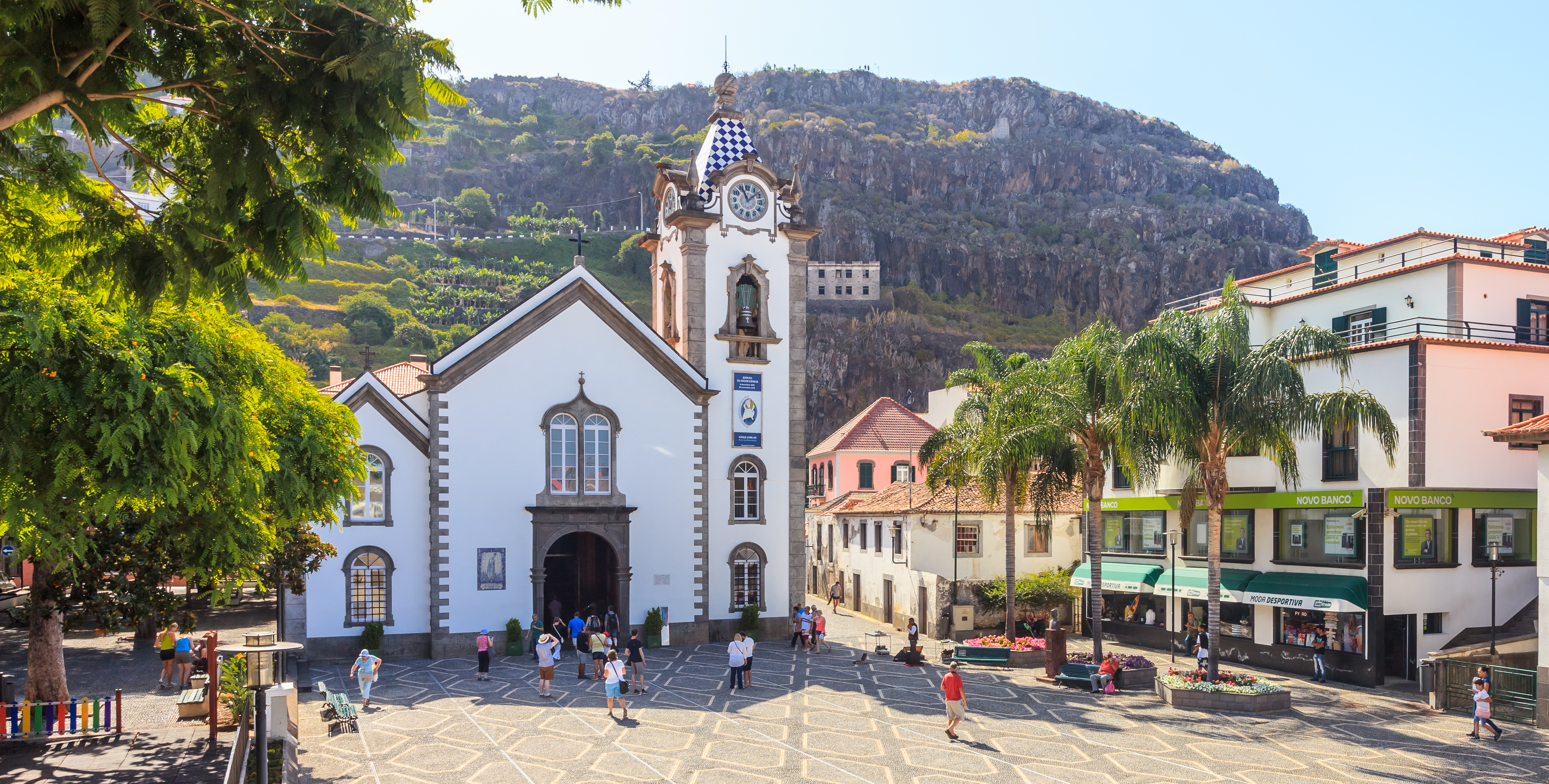
São Bento church

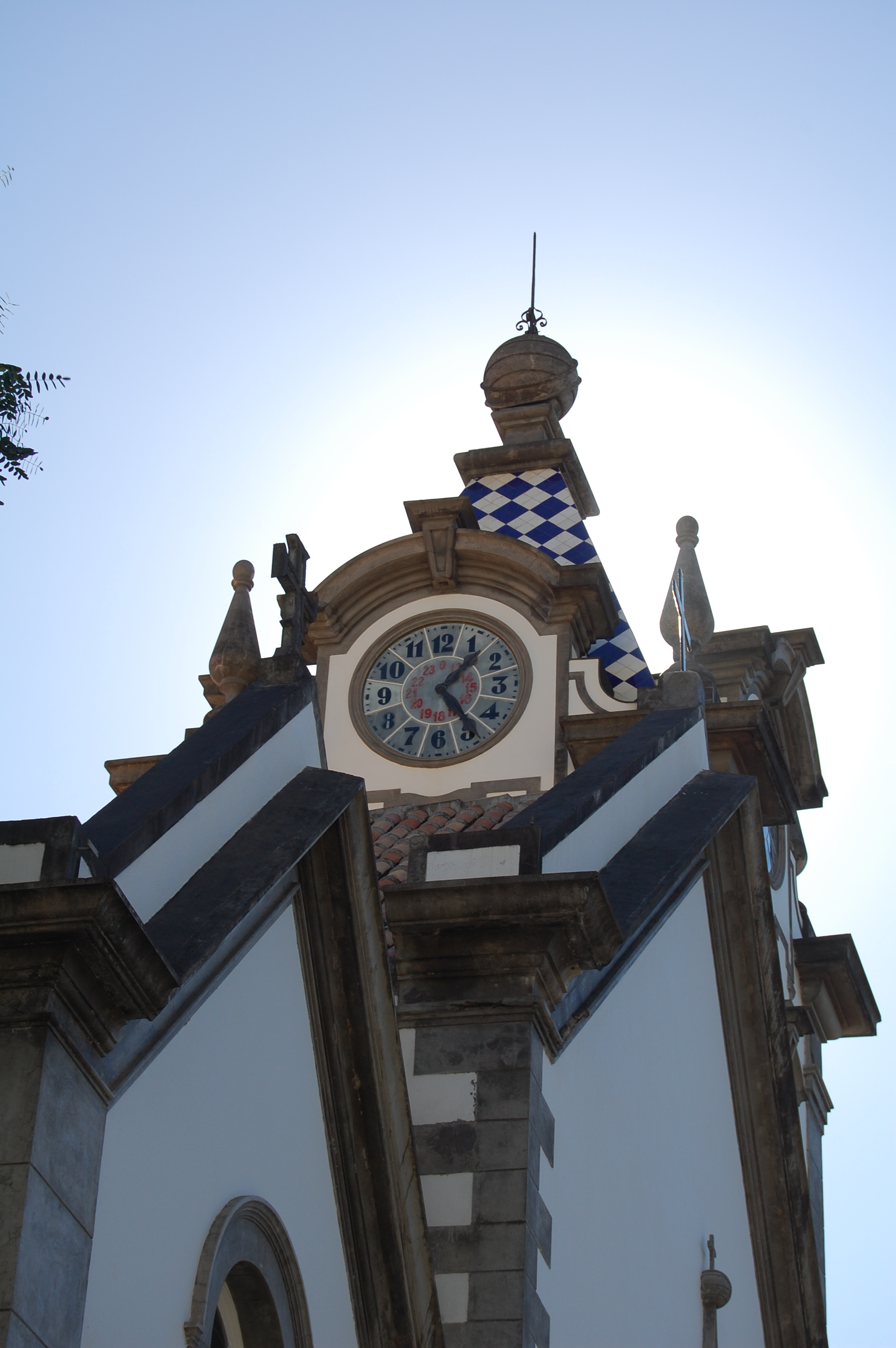
São Bento church's clock

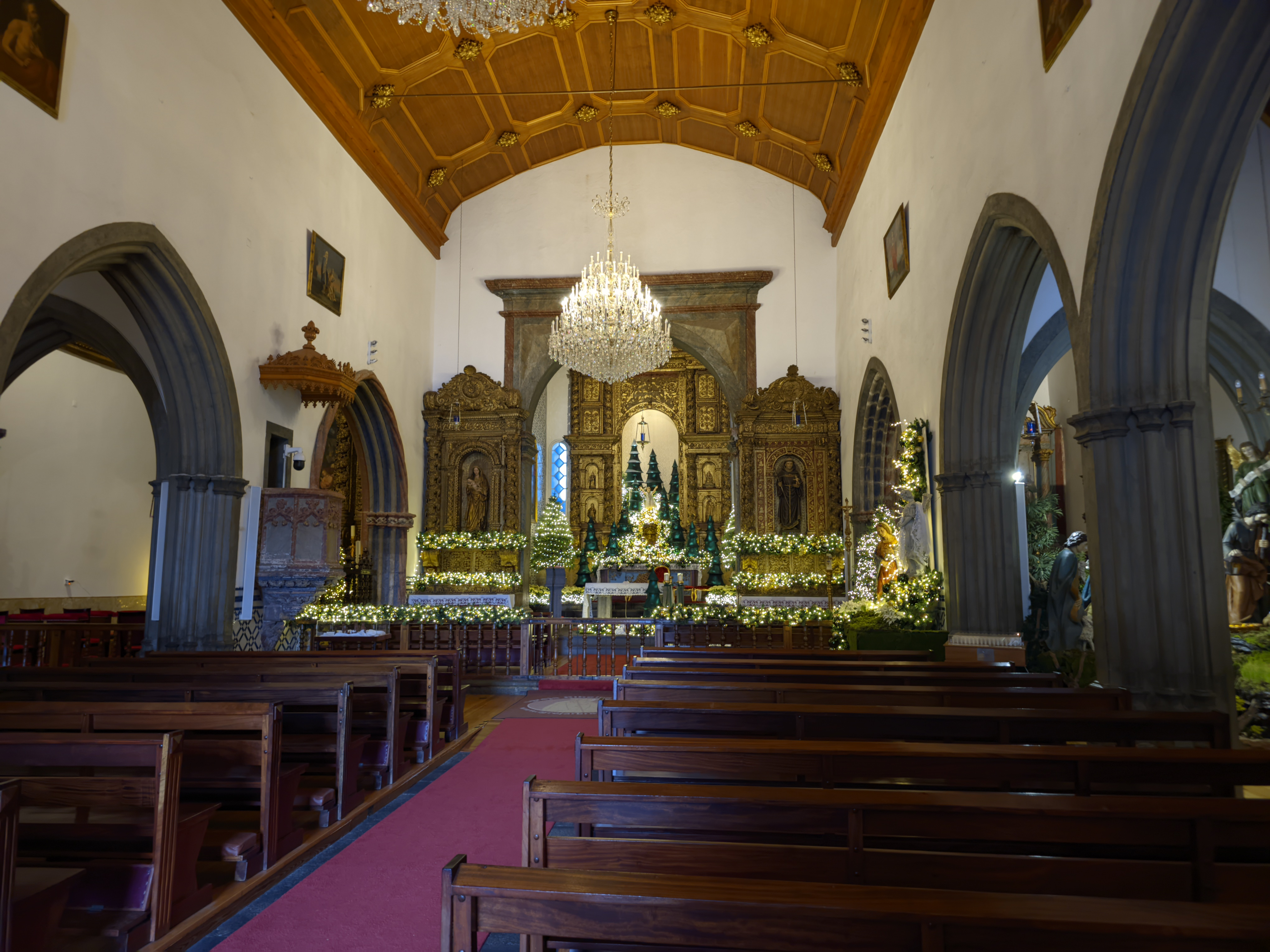
Interior of Ribeira Brava's church

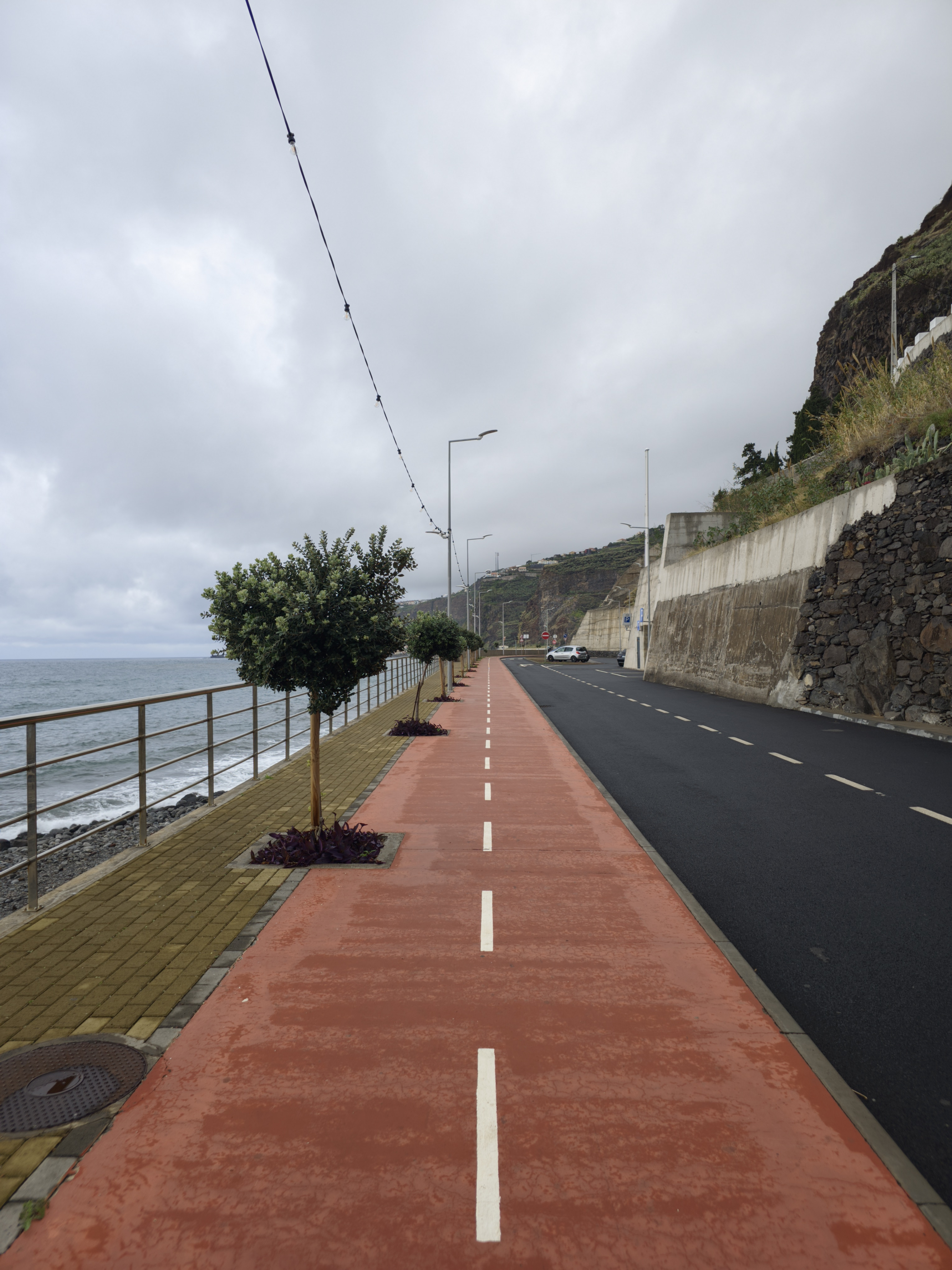
Road between Ribeira Brava and Tabua

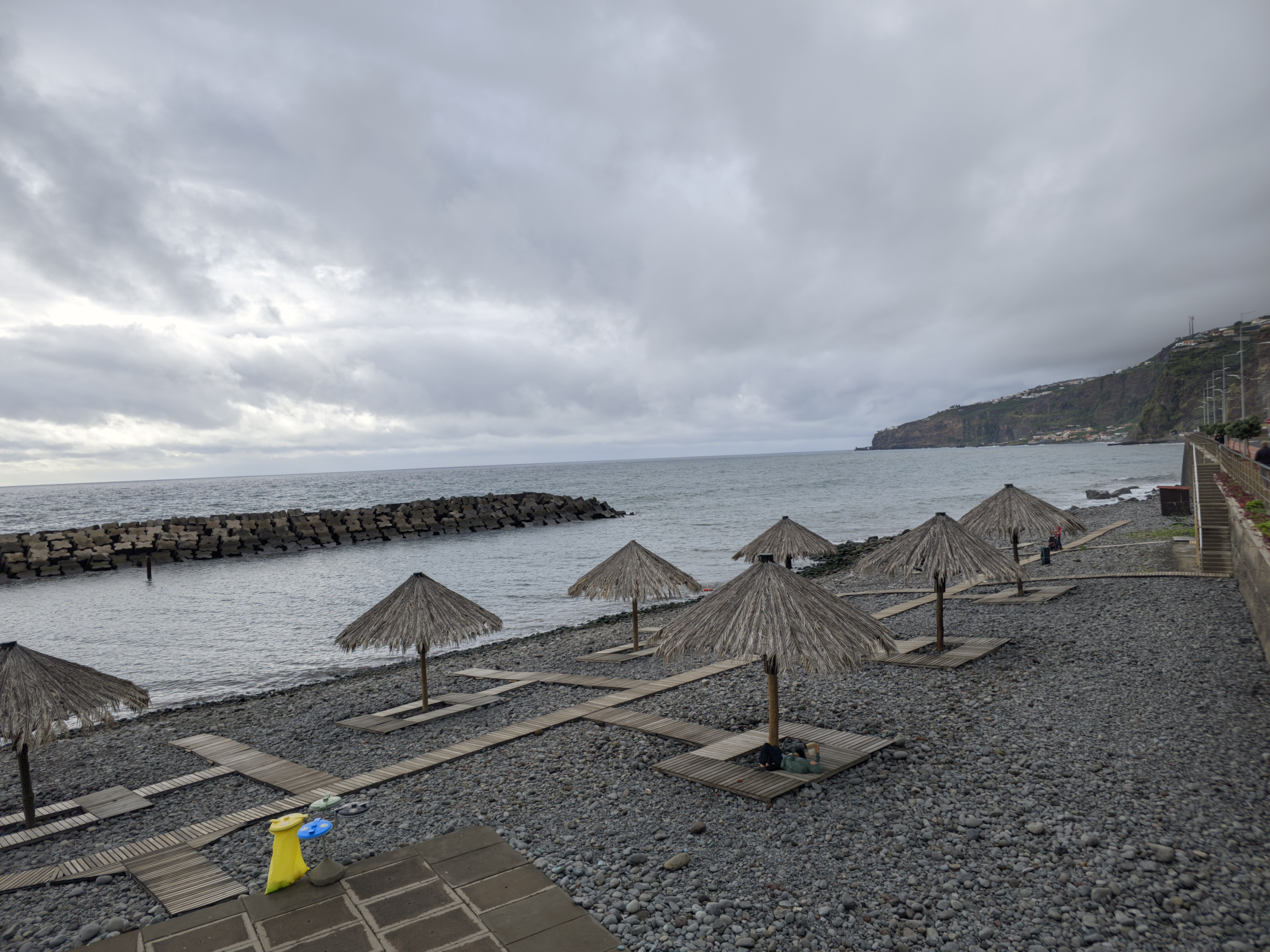
Beach

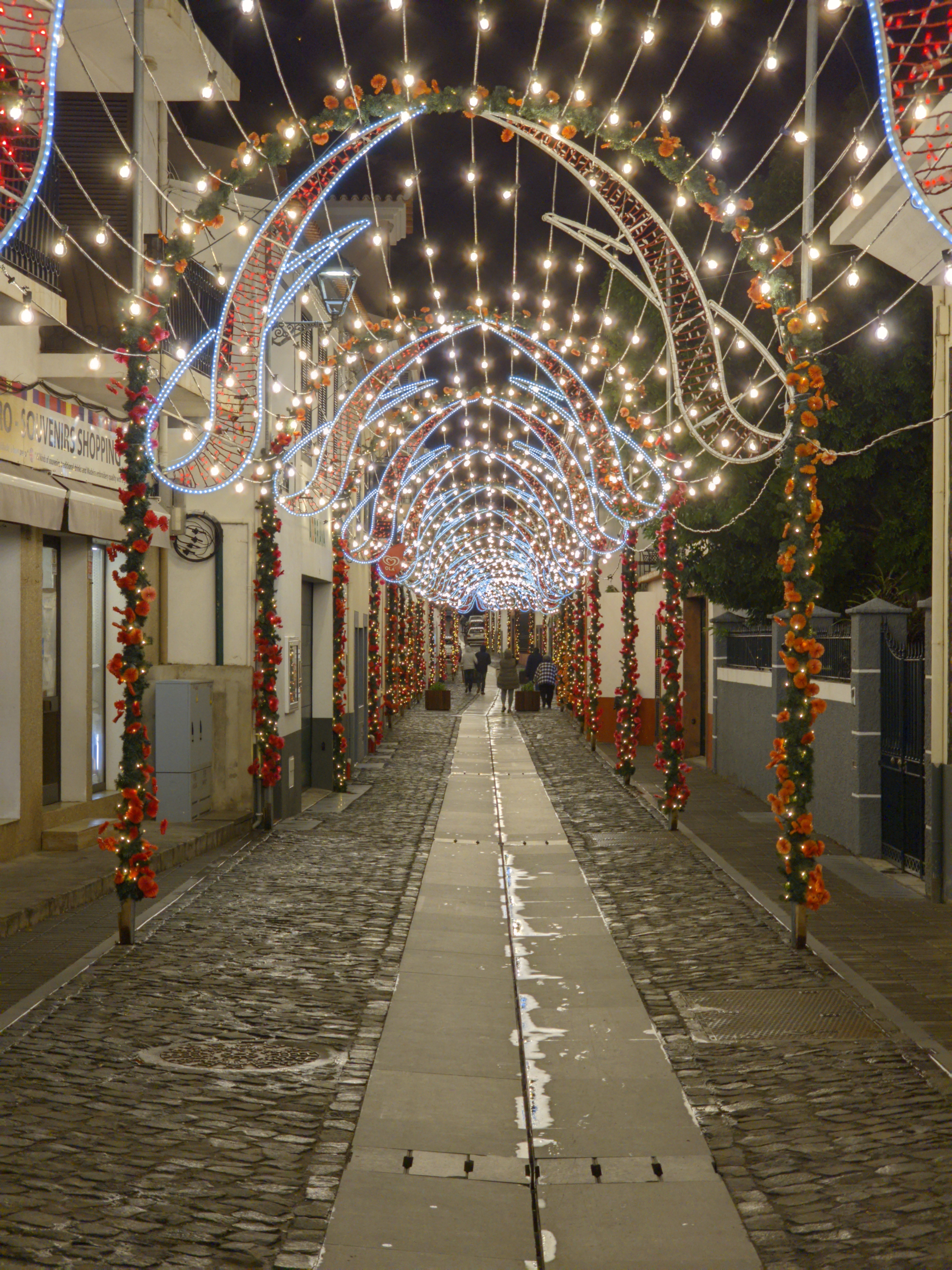
Road in the centre of the town, with Christmas lights

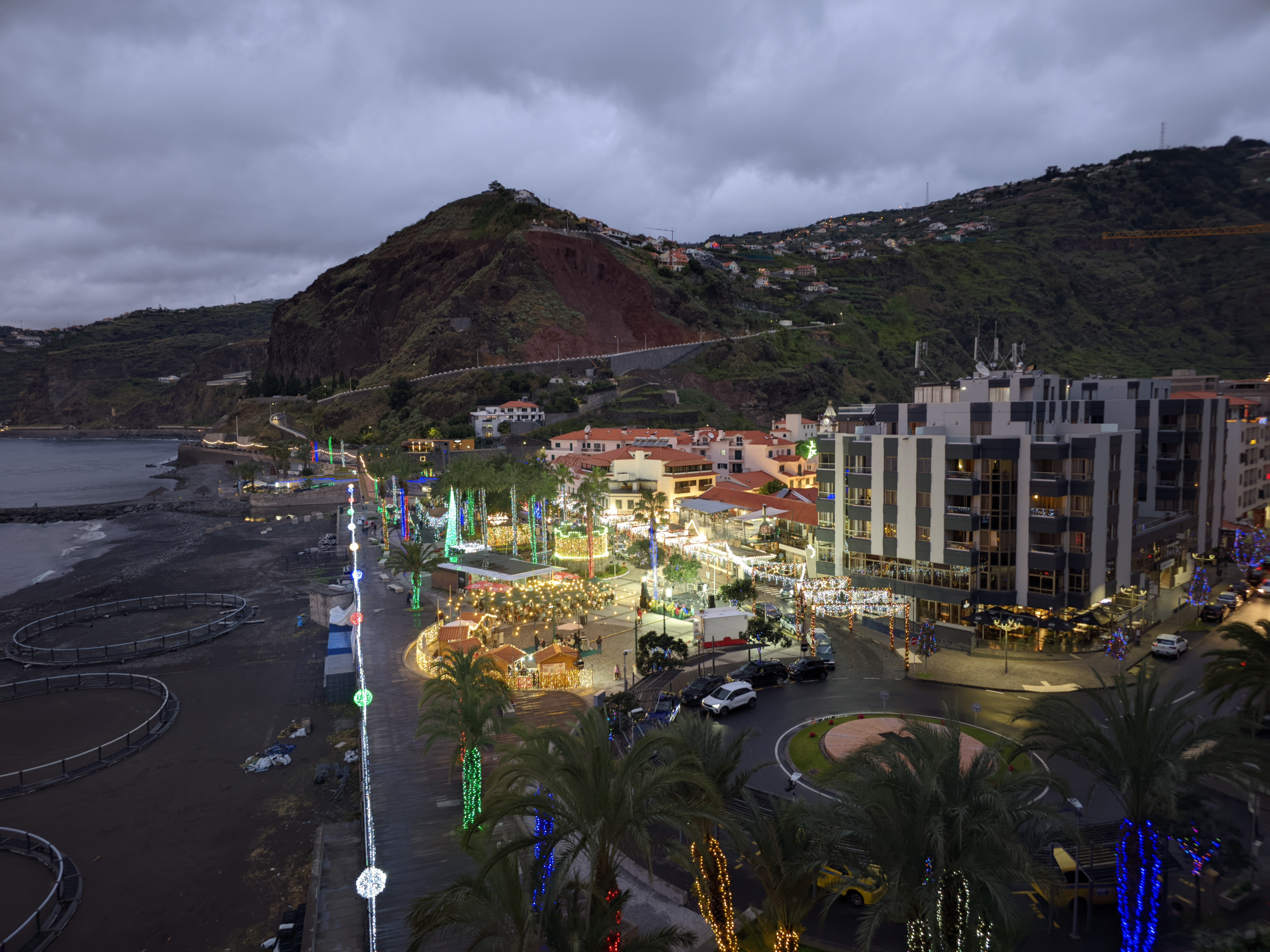
Christmas lights, seen from Ribeira Brava's lighthouse

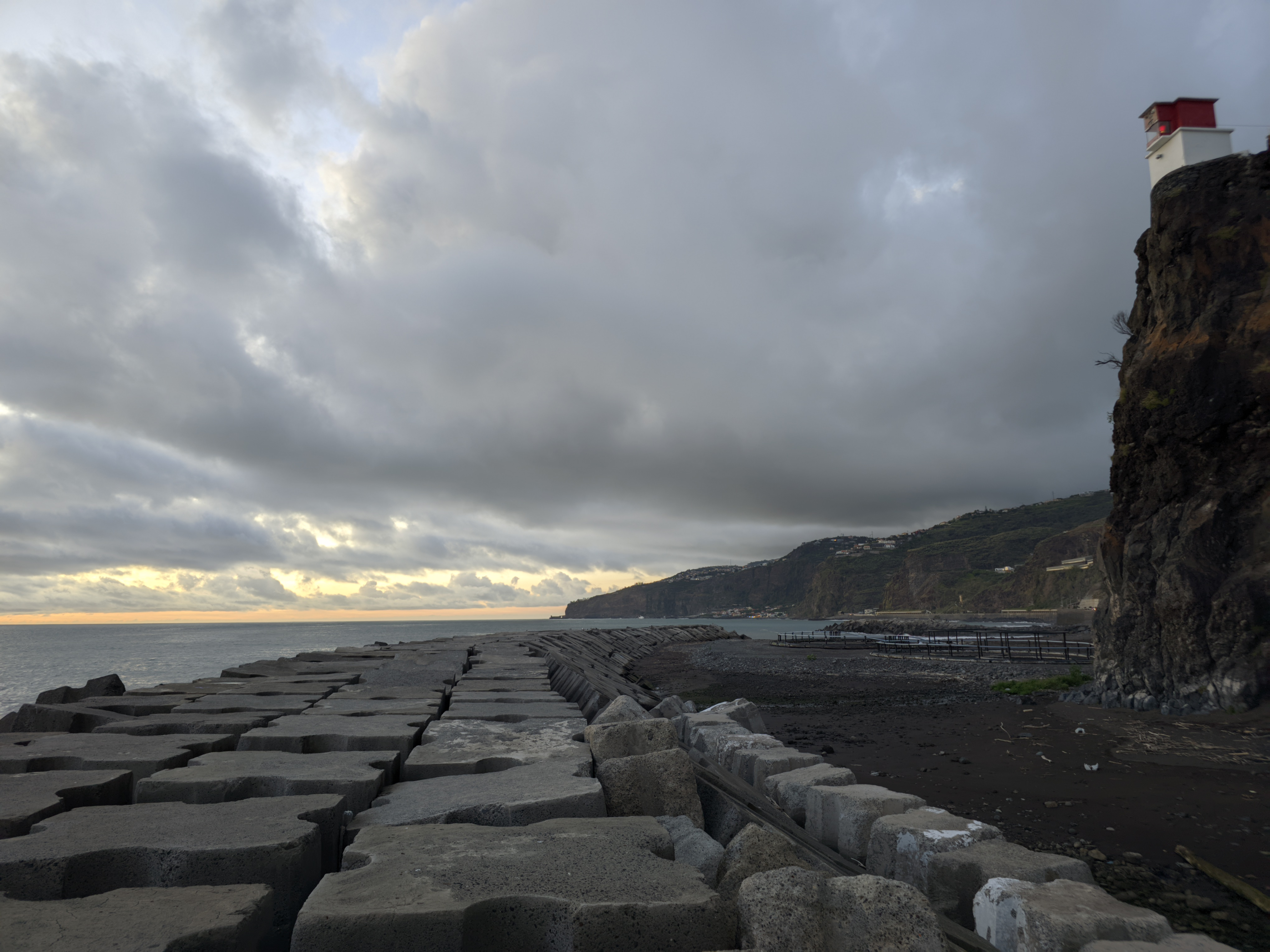
Breakwater

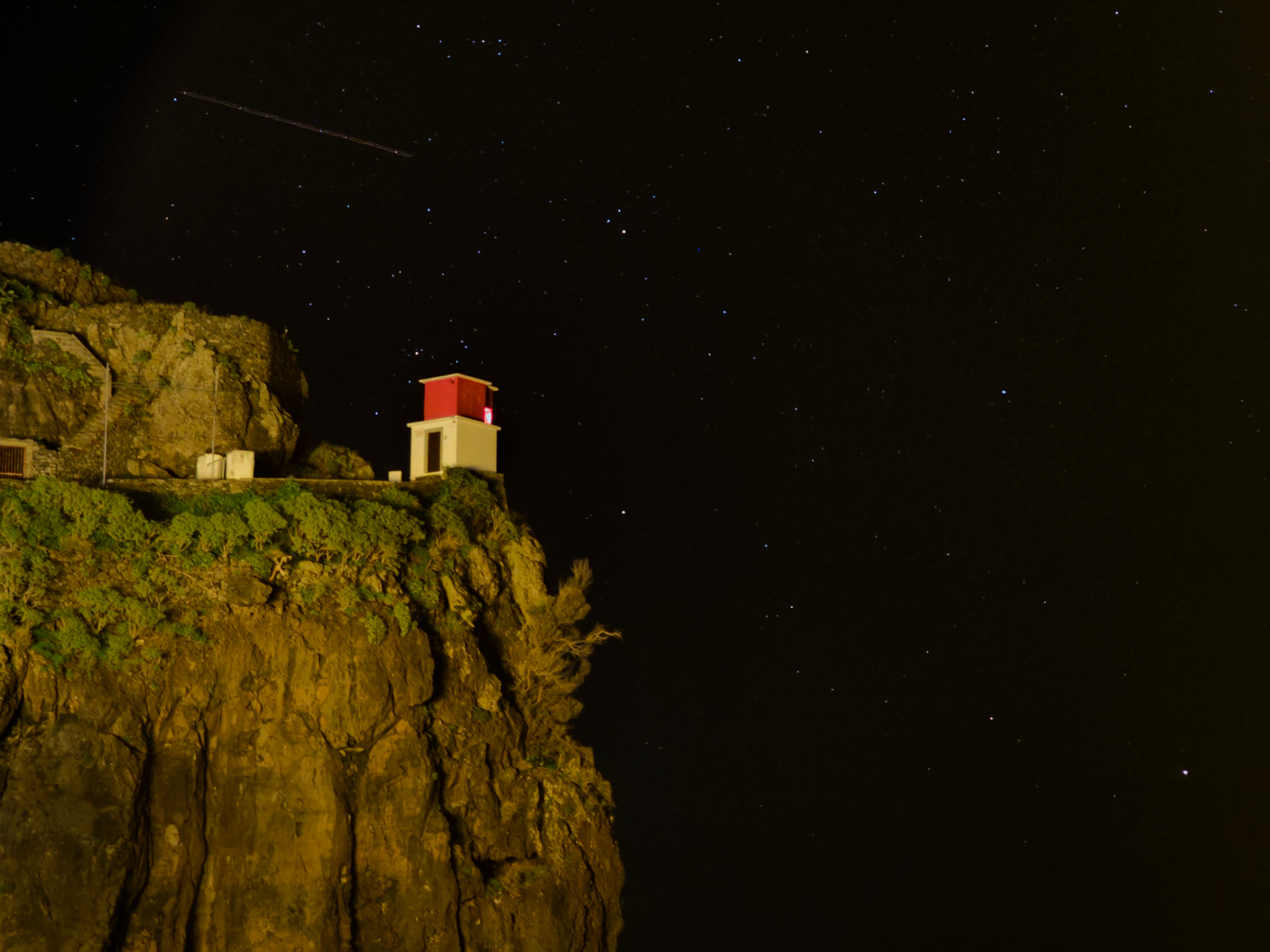
Light house at night

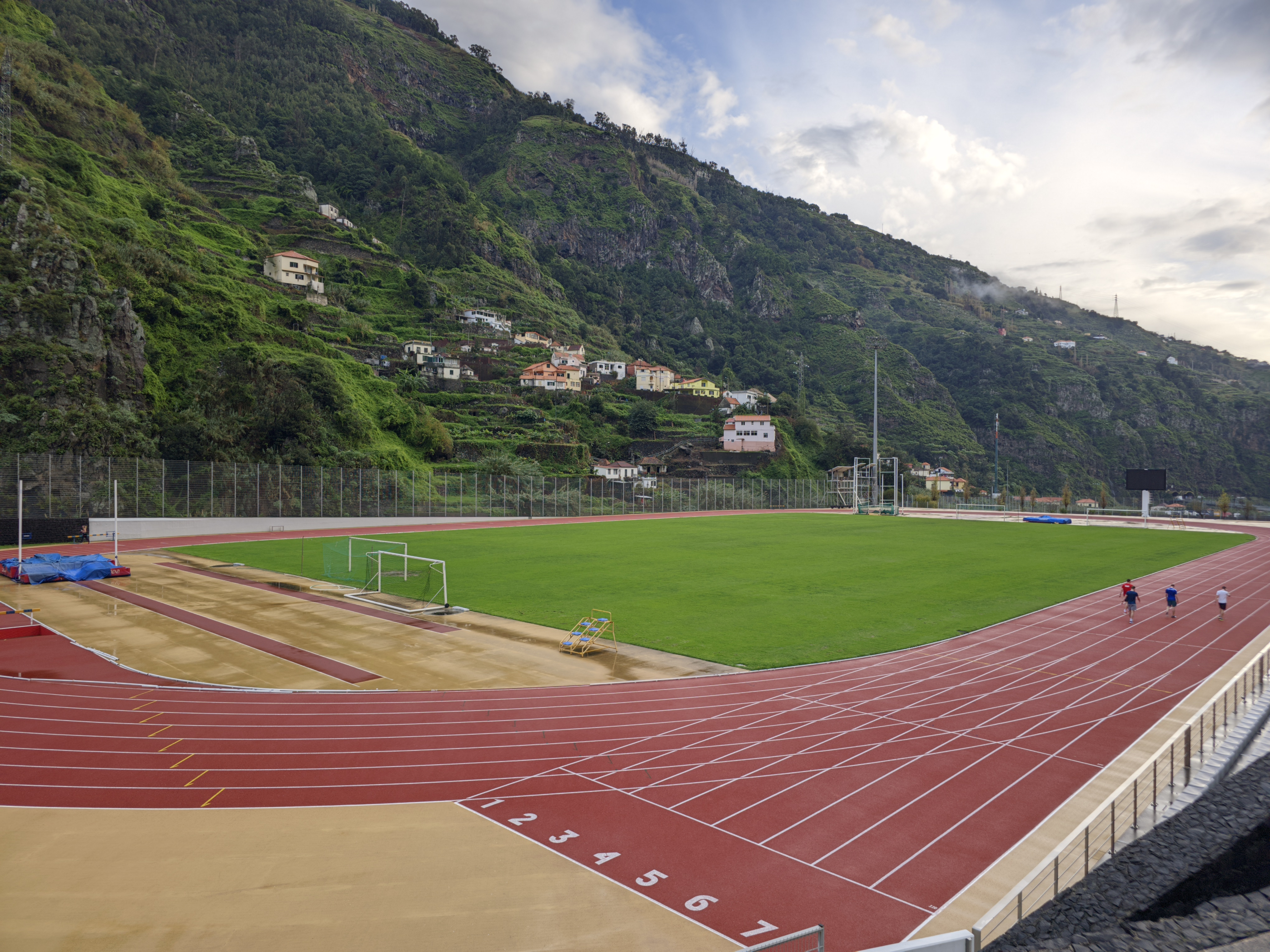
Centro Desportivo da Madeira
