= Tabua, Madeira =

Tabua
- Civil parish
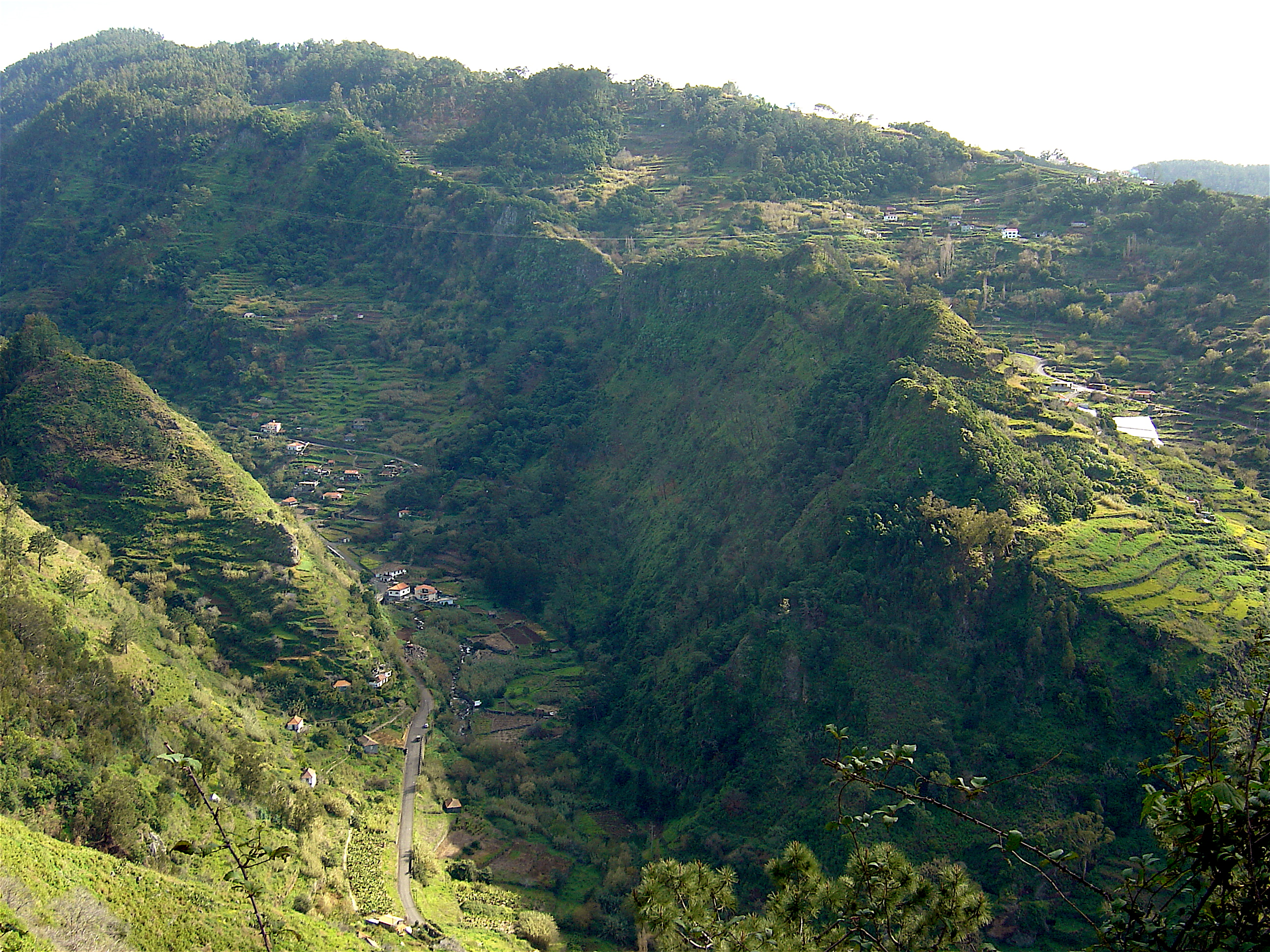
- Coordinates: 32.683°N 17.067°W
- Country: Portugal
- Auton. region: Madeira
- Island: Madeira
- Municipality: Ribeira Brava
- Established: The latter half of the seventeenth century

Area
  - Total: 11.03 km^{2} (4.26 sq mi)

Population (2011)
  - Total: 1,156
  - Density: 100/km^{2} (270/sq mi)
- Time zone: UTC+00:00 (WET)
  - Summer (DST): UTC+01:00 (WEST)
- Website: www.freguesiatabua.pt

Tabua is a parish in the municipality of Ribeira Brava in the island of Madeira. It is located on the south coast, west of Funchal. The population in 2011 was 1,156, in an area of 11.03 km^{2}. The municipality has a road which connects Calheta with Funchal, the capital, by road. The municipality of Ponta do Sol is to the west, and the municipality of São Vicente is to the north. On its southern border, the municipality borders the Atlantic.
