= Brava, Costa Rica =

Island of Costa Rica

Coordinates: 10.70573°N 83.68871°W

Brava or Isla Brava is an island of Costa Rica. It is a fluvial island near the border with Nicaragua. It has an area of 44 km^{2} (17 sq mi). It is part of the Refugio Barra de Colorado, a nature reserve.
