= Nuno Brás =

Portuguese Catholic bishop (born 1963)

His Most Reverend Excellency, Dom Nuno I
- Bishop of Funchal
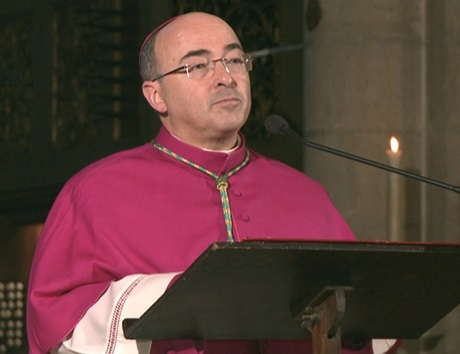
- Church: Catholic Church
- Archdiocese: Patriarchate of Lisbon
- Province: Lisbon
- Metropolis: Lisbon
- Diocese: Funchal
- See: Funchal
- Appointed: 12 January 2019
- Installed: 17 February 2019
- Predecessor: António III
- Other posts: Rector of the Portuguese Pontifical College in Rome (2002-2005); Rector of the Olivais Major Seminary of Christ the King (2005-2011)
- Previous posts: Auxiliary Bishop of the Patriarchate of Lisbon (2011-2019); Titular Bishop of the Elvas (2011-2019)

Orders
- Ordination: 4 July 1987 by António II, Patriarch of Lisbon
- Consecration: 20 November 2011 by José IV, Patriarch of Lisbon, Manuel Clemente, Bishop of Porto and Salvatore Fisichella, Titular Archbishop of Voghenza
- Rank: Bishop

Personal details
- Born: Nuno Brás da Silva Martins; 12 May 1963 (age 63) Vimeiro
- Residence: Casa Episcopal do Funchal
- Occupation: University Professor; Journalist
- Education: Catholic University of Portugal, Pontifical Gregorian University
- Motto: In Verbo Tuo
- Coat of arms

Dom Nuno Brás da Silva Martins (born 12 May 1963 in Vimeiro, Lourinhã), most often referred to simply as Dom Nuno Brás, is a Portuguese Catholic bishop and current bishop of Funchal, Madeira.

== Academic career ==
Nuno Brás da Silva Martins graduated in Theology from the Portuguese Catholic University in 1985. Five years later he earned his master's degree in Systematic Theology under the guidance of José IV. His thesis was titled The Christian life as an extension of the incarnation. Theology of Christian existence in the pastoral works of Cardinal Cerejeira.

He later received his doctorate in Fundamental Theology in 1999, from the Pontifical Gregorian University in Rome, with the thesis: Christ perfect communicator. Theological reading for an interdisciplinary investigation on the communicative phenomenon. He was guided by Archbishop Rino Fisichella.

In addition to his Portuguese teaching positions, Martins also taught at the Pontifical University of Salamanca in 1996, and at the Pontifical Gregorian University between 1999 and 2005.

In 2009 he became a member of the Scientific Society of the Portuguese Catholic University.

== Ecclesiastical career ==
Martins' first significant role in the Catholic Church started in 1993, when he was appointed to the educational team of the Olivais Major Seminary of Christ the King. Between 2005 and 2011 he was Rector of the same institution.

In Rome, Bishop Martins was Rector of the Pontifical Portuguese College between 2002 and 2005. In 2006 he returned to Portugal to work in the Patriarchate administration as a member of the Pastoral Council of the archdiocese of Lisbon and Canon of the Metropolitan Chapter of the Patriarchal See.

In 2011 he was elected, by Pope Benedict XVI, as Titular Bishop of Elvas and Auxiliary Bishop of the Patriarchate of Lisbon. He also served in the Portuguese Conference of Bishops as member of the sectorial commissions for Culture, Cultural Assets and Social Communications of the Catholic Church in Portugal and for Christian Education and the Doctrine of Faith.

Martins was then appointed, in 2016, by Pope Francis as a member of the Dicastery for Communication of the Holy See. This led him in 2018 to become coordinator of the Social Communications of the Commission for Evangelization and Culture, a body of the Council of Episcopal Conferences of Europe.

=== Bishop of Funchal ===
On January 12, 2019, Martins was elected by Pope Francis as Bishop of Funchal, succeeding António III. When he found out about the appointment, Martins said he felt "a mixture of fear and confidence. Fear because I am aware of my limitations; confidence because I know that Jesus will always be with me and not abandon me."

Marcelo Rebelo de Sousa, President of Portugal, congratulated Bishop Martins and said that the appointment "fills all Portuguese, believers and non-believers with joy".

Martins arrived at Cristiano Ronaldo International Airport on February 15, 2019, where he was greeted by his predecessor before kissing the ground following the custom set by Pope John Paul II. He noted that his mission as Bishop was " to build a Christian community and evangelize". He also highlighted the role of Christian religious tourism in the region.

Regarding the sex abuse scandal surrounding Father Anastácio Alves, Martins told the press that he would follow the process established by the Portuguese Episcopal Conference in 2012.

==== Taking office ====
On Sunday, February 17, Martins officially took office as Bishop of Funchal in a ceremony held in the Cathedral of Funchal. In his first homily he appealed to the "holiness" of the priests, called for a Church that "dares to be" and not just "appears to be", asked his Diocesan Curia to give testimonial of the Risen Christ and called for "a sincere collaboration with all entities of the Madeiran society, with respect for each one of them".

The following Catholic clergy attended his first Mass on taking office:

Country	Attendee	Rank
Portugal	Manuel III	Cardinal-Patriarch of Lisbon
Portugal	Teodoro Faria	Bishop Emeritus of Funchal
Portugal	António III	Bishop Emeritus of Funchal
Portugal	Francisco Senra de Faria Coelho	Archbishop of Évora
Portugal	António Montes	Bishop Emeritus of Bragança-Miranda
Portugal	José Ornelas	Bishop of Setúbal
Portugal	José Traquina	Bishop of Santarém
Portugal	Manuel Quintas	Bishop of Faro
Portugal	António Braga	Bishop Emeritus of the Angra
Portugal	António Luciano	Bishop of Viseu
Portugal	Manuel Felício	Bishop of Guarda
Portugal	António Moiteiro	Bishop of Aveiro
Portugal	José Cordeiro	Bishop of Bragança-Miranda
Portugal	Daniel Batalha	Auxiliary Bishop of Lisbon
Portugal	Joaquim Mendes	Auxiliary Bishop of Lisbon
Portugal	Rui Valério	Bishop of the Portuguese Military Ordinariate of Portugal
Cape Verde	Ildo Fortes	Bishop of Mindelo-Cabo-Verde
Holy See	Rino Passigato	Titular Archbishop of Nova Caesaris and Apostolic Nuncio to Portugal;
Madagascar	Alfredo Caires	Bishop of Mananjary

===== Meetings with regional and local authorities =====
- Official meeting with the Representative of the Republic, Irineu Barreto;
- Official meeting with the President of the Legislative Assembly of Madeira, Tranquada Gomes;
- Official meeting with the President of the Regional Government, Miguel Albuquerque;
- Official meeting with the Mayor of Funchal, Paulo Cafôfo;

===== "Reconnaissance" visits =====
On the first months, shortly after taking office, Bishop Nuno, started a series of semi-formal visits around the Autonomous Regions of Madeira to better know the pastoral needs of the diocese. Such visits included:

- 4-day Pastoral Visit to the parishes of Porto Santo Island;
- Visit to the Sacred Art Museum of Funchal;
- Meeting with priests responsible for the parishes located in the northern municipalities of Madeira Island;
- Meeting with priests responsible for the parishes located in the Machico and Santa Cruz municipalities;
- Meetings with Catholic schools and institutions around Madeira Island;

===== Priest Giselo Andrade Case =====
Following the Priest Giselo Andrade's case and his assignment to the Communications and Media Office of the diocese by his predecessor Bishop Carrilho, Bishop Martins opted to remove Father Giselo from the Permanent Secretariat of the Diocese following his cabinet reshuffle.

==== Diocese's coat of arms ====
On March 23, 2019, the Bishop Nuno announced through the diocese's Facebook page and on a historical note on the diocese's website the adoption of the diocese's coat of arms. The coat of arms was designed by Miguel Pinto-Correia following the economist's open letter to the bishop, published in the regional newspaper, suggesting that the Diocese should adopt a coat of arms on 600th anniversary of the discovery of Madeira.

==== 600th Anniversary of the Discovery of Madeira ====
On Madeira Day 2019, the year that Madeira celebrated its 600th anniversary of discovery and settlement, Bishop Martins addressed in the Te Deum Mass stressed that such a historical feat was, overall, also a beneficial Christian feat of the Church that became a blessing for the entire population that later settled on the island.

In his sermon Bishop Martins publicly acknowledged that despite 600 years of Catholicism on the island, the Diocese could "not fail to acknowledge the many sins, the many failings and failures that have marked these 600 years, whether by individual Christians or by the Christian community as a whole". Implying acknowledgement of the Diocese's persecution and pressure against the Anglican and Evangelical Churches on the island.

=== Episcopal Conference of Portugal ===
As a diocesan member of the Episcopal Conference of Portugal, Bishop Martins participates in the following bodies within the Conference:

- Member of Commission for Christian Education and Doctrine of Faith (2017-2020);
- Member of Commission for Culture, Cultural Assets and Media (2017-2020);

=== Healthcare ===
As Bishop of Funchal, Nuno Brás is engaged in several public healthcare programs of which the Diocese heads in partnership with the Regional Government of Madeira.

==== Brothers Hospitallers of Saint John of God ====
Together with the Brothers Hospitallers of Saint John of God, the diocese is responsible for providing pastoral care for the patients of the Institute of the Brothers Hospitallers of Saint John of God located in Funchal, since 1924 and inaugurated by the Blessed Juan Jesús Adradas Gonzalo.

==== Dragoeiro Alzheimer Unit ====
In September 2021, the diocese, together with the parish of São Bento (Ribeira Brava) and in partnership with the Regional Government, inaugurated the Dragoeiro Alzheimer Unit. The projected head by Fr. Bernardino Trindade, took seven years to be built, and cost a million euros, of which 800 thousand were financed by European funds. The unit has the capacity to receive 63 patients (18 inpatients and 45 in the day centre) from all over Madeira.

The Regional Government aims for the unit are to become a national reference in the Alzheimer's patients continuous care.

=== Teaching ===
Shortly after taking up office as Bishop of Funchal, Nuno Brás decided that, in partnership with the Theological School of Funchal, he would teach "Introduction to Christianity" and "Revelation, Faith's Foundation" as after-work courses open to anyone interested.

=== Vocations crisis ===
Madeira, as the rest of Portugal, has faced a huge decrease of clergymen, between 2009 and 2014, the country has lost more than 600 priests.

Nuno I inherited from his predecessors a vocations crisis. The Diocese of Madeira faces a shortage of those wishing to consecrate their lives as clergy to the Catholic Church. Nuno I has stated that “in the 90s we were a flourishing island in quantity and quality of vocations, but suddenly, in the space of 20 years, vocations ceased to exist”.

In the bishop's opinion vocations thrive in living Christian communities, in communities which have groups of young people who are enthusiastic about the Christian life, where good catechists are present, where there's a strong parish community and priests who lead their parishes and lives by example.

=== COVID-19 ===
==== Caritas Emergency Fund ====
During the early months of the COVID-19 in Madeira Nuno I rapidly activated the Social Emergency Fund run by the local branch of Caritas with the aim of helping those who have "proven to have been affected, in social and economic terms” the pandemic. The fund of five hundred thousand Euros resulted from a cooperation agreement with the Regional Secretariat for Social Inclusion and Citizenship and aimed to financially support families' “food and fixed costs, medication and consultations, housing and rent and schooling”.

==== Religious Services ====
The Regional Government of Madeira enacted, through State of Emergency powers, several restrictions to religious services including non communal mass celebrations. Theses restrictions were imposed together with the Diocese and later lifted in May also in consultation with the Bishop. Miguel Albuquerque, President of the Regional Government Madeira insisted in being contact with the Nuno I, so that together they could come up with a set of procedures aimed at resuming the activities of “face-to-face religious worship”, while abiding to all the prophylactic measures of distance and containment.

On the reopening of the religious services, Nuno I insisted on informing all parishioners that all risk groups stayed at home throughout the pandemic, instead of attending religious services. And a list of the restrictions regarding religious services was published on the Diocese's website.

===== Childbirth Masses =====
The traditional Childbirth Masses were also subject to strict sanitary regulations by the Diocese under Nuno I rule. Having in mind the subsequent deaths related with COVID-19, after Summer, the bishop coordinated the Diocese's regulations with those of the Regional Government of Madeira and forbade the traditional after mass gatherings, meals and celebrations that occur after the religious services.

=== Centenary of Charles of Austria ===
During his tenure as Bishop of Funchal, Nuno Brás was responsible for the catholic celebration of centenary of the death of the Emperor-King Charles I of Austria, who died in Madeira. Brás considered the late Emperor as an "example and intercessor", highlighting his efforts for peace, "at a time when war is invading Europe".

The celebrations involved not only the Diocese, but also the Regional Government of Madeira and the Hungarian Embassy in Lisbon, the latter being a patron of a musical concert led by the Madeira Classical Orchestra. These celebrations were attended by Archdukes Karl von Habsburg and Ferdinand von Habsburg and extended imperial family.

=== Potential Candidate as Bishop of Guarda ===
In June 2024, media outlets, speculated that Nuno Brás would soon be transferred to the Diocese of Guarda, one of Portugal's most prestigious and oldest ecclesiastical territory. While no official confirmation had been provided at the time, the news stirred considerable interest and discussion among clergy and laypeople alike in the Autonomous Region.

Despite de commotion, Pope Francis ended up appointing José Miguel Pereira as Bishop of Guarda, instead of transferring Nuno Brás between Dioceses.

== Views ==
=== Education ===
In one of his masses as Auxiliary Bishop of Lisbon, Bishop Martins, invited catholic religious teachers to be "pilgrims of God". According to his homily teachers should show students that there is more to life than the things that "one can measure, weight or touch".

Bishop Martins, has ascertained that the role of teachers in society needs to be bigger than "raising rich [in knowledge] people, closed to themselves in this [non-believer] small horizon". According to him catholic religious teachers need to teach their students to search for God and to point out the answers that God gives.

=== Church child abuse scandal ===
As Auxiliary Bishop of the Patriarchate of Lisbon and following the McCarrick case and Viganò allegations, happening at about the same time as the conclusion of the Grand jury investigation of Catholic Church sexual abuse in Pennsylvania, Bishop Martins, together with his peers of the Portuguese Episcopal Conference was co-signer of a public support letter addressed to Pope Francis. The letter was published on September 3, 2018, and followed the Portuguese National Symposium of the Clergy, held in Fátima.

The Portuguese bishops criticized all "attempts to call into question the [Pope's] credibility" and expressed "fraternal support" to the leader of the Catholic Church, stressing that they are in "full communion" with the Pope.

In the same letter, Bishop Martins and his peers also took the opportunity to support and condemn the "drama of child abuse by responsible members of the Church," under a commitment to "root out the causes."

He would later reiterate his public support for Pope Francis pontificate by declaring to Vatican News that " [Pope Francis's pontificate] is the pontificate that God wants for today's time," and concluded that "we should always thank the Popes that God gives us".

Nevertheless, as Bishop of Funchal, Nuno Martins refused to create, in 2019, a special commission to investigate cases of child abuse in the diocese, contrary to the example set by the Patriarchate of Lisbon, under the argument that "there are no cases that justify such". In this regard, Bishop Martins did not considered the case of Father Anastácio, who is missing, and who is being investigated by the Judiciary Police due to child abuse crimes. Instead he preferred to maintain an internal diocesan investigation on that specific case while stating that he does not want to "substitute the police" in this matter.

=== Virgin Mary ===
On the diocese's online newspaper Bishop Martins wrote that the Virgin Mary was the woman in the likeness of Christ. In his theological article he stated that the Virgin Mary was physically and spiritually similar to Christ:

"That, physically, she was similar to her Son, it is not surprising. And no, I am not mistaken: even physically, it is the Virgin who is similar to her Son, because it was in his image that everything was created!

But it is much more than that: everything about the Virgin Mary is like Jesus. Because she is his perfect, finished disciple: the disciple who follows the Lord through the dusty paths of Galilee and Judea; the disciple standing at the cross; the disciple who was given the mission to care for other disciples forever, throughout history.

The Virgin Mary (of course she is a Virgin, even physically, because that is the sign that the One who was born of her is truly God, and she is all of God and for God!) has the form of Jesus Christ."

=== Venezuela crisis ===
Bishop Martins set as one of his main priorities upon taking office the care and looking after of those Madeirans and second-generation Madeirans that are fleeing from Venezuela as consequence of Maduro's regime. On this issue he has stated that "it is necessary to welcome those who need help. Then it will also be important to develop cooperation with the Caritas of Venezuela, as an institution that is necessarily credible to support the people of Madeira and beyond, who are experiencing very difficult times."

=== Homosexuality ===
When interviewed on March 2, 2019, Bishop Martins admitted that homosexuals can be "good Christians". Further to this he stated that "God loves you in this situation of yours. And because he loves you, he invites you to convert. He invites you to change". He clarified that he views homosexuality as a condition and as such Jesus Christ invites all Christians to internally convert.

The bishop's views were heavily criticized by Madeira Pride, the region's LGBT pride organiser, when he stated that it was a contradiction to call family to a homosexual union.

=== Abortion ===
Bishop Martins is a critic of the abortion laws in Portugal and the possibility of the legalization of euthanasia, having used the diocese's online newspaper to criticize further liberalization of said laws. He has stated that a "society that allows someone to decide on the life of another is not a society we want to live in... All Human life is sacred and untouchable.

=== Euthanasia ===
In February 2020, following the debate in the Assembly of the Republic to approve the euthanasia in Portugal, Bishop Nuno Brás ordered all priest to give sermons against euthanasia and all parishes to distribute leaflets explaining the concepts of assisted death and of the right to life. The leaflets ordered to be distributed, and published by the Portuguese Episcopal Conference, contained only questions with answers defended by the Catholic Church that reinforce the conviction that “one must defend human life to the end. Never cause death".

Another action carried out by Bishop Nuno Brás, in February 2020, in an attempt to raise the issue among the catholic people in Madeira, was to hold an ecumenical vigil in the Church of the college with leaders of other main Christian faiths on the island, among them Ilse Berardo. The vigil was attended by the President of the Legislative Assembly of Madeira and member of CDS-PP Madeira, José Manuel Rodrigues.

As a member of the Portuguese Episcopal Conference, Bishop Nuno Brás advocates the referendum against the decriminalization of euthanasia in Portugal and proposes to deputies in the Assembly of the Republic a stronger investment on palliative care. He has also accused the Portuguese deputies proponents of euthanasia of choosing the "cheapest way out" for the Portuguese Healthcare System instead of focusing taxpayers money in palliative care.

Also the issue of euthanasia, Bishop Martins stated that:

“Whether it is a passing disease, a chronic illness, or a very serious illness, in which it seems that the whole world is fleeing from us, we Christians want to become aware, we want to say that we are not alone, we want to realize that God is with us, that He never leaves us ”

=== Political views ===
==== Demographics ====
In 2019, Bishop Martins expressed his concern for the lack of a young population in the Autonomous Region of Madeira and a "frightening" low number of births. He also pointed out that young people who exist at any given moment, go to the mainland to attend university and lose their roots acquired in Madeira, implying lack of economic opportunities.

==== Regionalisation ====
Bishop Martins was against the regionalisation of mainland Portugal at the time of the 1998 Portuguese regionalisation referendum. Faced with his assignment to the Diocese of Funchal and on his first anniversary as bishop of the diocese he publicly acknowledge his misconceptions on the issue:

“I was decidedly opposed to regionalization, when it was the referendum. At this moment, I am wondering if regionalization is not the opportunity that regions in the interior of the continent could seize for development and for the resolution of problems that they objectively have...[regionalization] was the way that the Madeirans found to claim before the national government an increase in their standard of living, a set of improvements that would otherwise always be difficult... Regionalization, in the specific case of Madeira, meant that there was development, improvement of living standards, with the Madeirans becoming aware of their own identity - with some pride, I must say - of their specificity and of what they can give to the whole of Portugal."

==== 2019 Regional Elections ====
During the 2019 Madeiran regional election Bishop Martins appealed to candidates to use the electoral campaign as a "time of civilization" and criticized "personal attacks" and "slander" among politicians. He further requested that all candidates should have dignified debates and should "respect for the dignity of other participants”, the electoral campaign should be "a time and a space for civilization".

Contrary to his predecessors, Bishop Martins requested the parties and their candidates to not use catholic churchyards as places for political campaign rallies with the use of megaphones.

== Coat of Arms ==
Coat of arms of Nuno Brás da Silva Martins, Bishop of Funchal
Adopted 2011 Coronet Bishop's Galero Escutcheon Purple, a sword pointed Or, between a star of seven beams Argent, and an olive branch Argent, fruited Or. Supporters A latin cross Or. Motto In Verbo Tuo Symbolism The sword: St. Paul affirms that the Word of God is the "sword of the Spirit" (Eph. 6:17), and the Letter to the Hebrews affirms that it is "living and effective, more penetrating than any double-edged sword. It judges the dispositions and the intentions of the heart "(Heb 4,12). On the other hand, the sword also refers to the land of origin of the new bishop (Vimeiro), whose patron saint is St. Michael, and also to St. Nuno de Santa Maria, who, having deposed the sword of war, allowed God to win, living their days in the recollection of the Carmo Convent (Lisbon) in the sanctity of life and in the distribution of their goods for the poor. The star refers to the Virgin Mary, the morning star, and her participation as a believer in the mystery of the cross (the Seven Sorrows of the Virgin), fulfilling the prophecy of the old Simeon (Luke 2:35: "A sword will pierce your soul" ).The olive branch, with 7 leaves and 12 olives, besides alluding to the mystery of Christ, the Anointed by the Spirit, whose priesthood is fully participated by the Bishops, successors of the Apostles, also alludes to the 7 gifts and 12 fruits of the Holy Spirit, as well as the charity that always animates the pastoral activity of the Church. He also refers to the Seminary of the Olive groves, where the new bishop exercised much of his priestly ministry. The motto "In Verbo tuo" is taken from Lk 5,5. After an unsuccessful night of fishing, and having heard the word of Jesus, Himself the Word of God, speaking to the multitude from his boat, St. Peter is invited by the Master to throw the nets afresh. In spite of his knowledge of the art of fishing to say that it is useless to resume this activity, St. Peter makes a profession of faith, stating that he would re-launch the nets for the sake of and in the word of Jesus, and was then confronted with fishing " of fish that the nets were breaking ". The bishop's whole activity is to repeat this profession of faith: after listening to the Lord who speaks from the boat of Peter who is the Church, the Bishop must live and act not from a mere human wisdom but from the Wisdom which it is Jesus himself, inviting everyone to live the happiness of knowing the Lord and living with Him.

== Bibliography ==
Styles of Nuno Brás da Silva Martins
- Reference style: His Most Reverend Excellency
- Spoken style: Your Excellency; Dom Nuno
- Religious style: Bishop

Throughout his career Bishop Martins has edited several book and contributed to scientific publications on theology.

=== Published books ===
- A vida cristã como extensão da encarnação. Teologia da existência cristã nas Obras Pastorais do Cardeal Cerejeira, Lisboa, Rei dos Livros - UCP, 1992.
- Cristo o comunicador perfeito. Delineamento de uma teologia da comunicação à luz da Instrução Pastoral Communio et progressio, Lisboa, Didaskalia, 2000.
- Introdução à Teologia, Lisboa, UCP, 2003.

=== Articles in Dictionaries and Encyclopedias ===
- «Revelação (Teol.)», in Verbo. Enciclopédia Luso-brasileira de cultura: edição séc. XXI, vol. 25, Lisboa-S. Paulo, Verbo, 1998–2003, 385–390.
- «Teologia fundamental», in Verbo. Enciclopédia Luso-brasileira de cultura: edição séc. XXI, vol. 27, Lisboa-S. Paulo, Verbo, 1998–2003, 1329–1330.
- «Tradição (Teol.)», in Verbo. Enciclopédia Luso-brasileira de cultura: edição séc. XXI, vol. 28, Lisboa-S. Paulo, Verbo, 1998–2003, 531–534.
- «Teología. II. Método Teológico», in C. IZQUIERDO (ed.), Diccionario de Teología, Pamplona, EUNSA, 2006, 941–946.

=== Other Published Works ===
- «Podemos acreditar em quem tem fé?», Novellae Olivarum 21 (1997) 33–38.
- «In honorem. O Professor João António de Sousa», Didaskalia XXVIII (1998) 211–214.
- «Mil anos de teologia: ao ritmo da Igreja e do mundo», Lumen Veritatis 6 (1999) 2.5.
- «ICNE: Um dom do Espírito Santo», Novellae Olivarum 32 (2006) 49–56.
- «Um ano centrado na Palavra de Deus», Novellae Olivarum 35 (2007) 7-22.
- «A atenção aos tempos novos na vida do evangelizador», Novellae Olivarum 35 (2007) 79–93.
- «Desafios da cultura contemporânea ao sacerdote e à Igreja. Intervenção III», in V SIMPÓSIO DO CLERO DE PORTUGAL, Presbitério em comunhão. Ao serviço da comunhão eclesial, Lisboa, Paulinas, 2007, 126–130.
- «Introdução», in D. ANTÓNIO RIBEIRO, Imagens vivas de Cristo Pastor. O ministério ordenado na Igreja, Lisboa, UCP, 2008, 5–13.
- «A Palavra de Deus na formação sacerdotal», Novellae Olivarum 36 (2008) 10–22.
- «Deitar-vos-ão no regaço uma boa medida, calcada, sacudida, transbordante (Lc 6,38)», Novellae Olivarum 37 (2008) 11–28.
- «Presenças sacramentais de Cristo», Novellae Olivarum, 39 (2009) 17–35.
- «Formar Padres sábios e santos», Novellae Olivarum, 41 (2010) 19–34.
- «O celibato sacerdotal: que razões?», Novellae Olivarum, 41 (2010) 35–64.
- «D. José Policarpo e a formação sacerdotal», Novellae Olivarum, 42 (2011) 17–29.
- «Prefácio», in D. ANTÓNIO RIBEIRO, Vida religiosa: a radicalidade do amor por Jesus, Lisboa, UCP, 2011, 5–7.

Catholic Church titles
Preceded by Tomás Pedro Barbosa da Silva Nunes	Titular Bishop of Elvas; 11 October 2011 - 12 January 2019	Succeeded by Darley José Kummer
Preceded by António III	Bishop of Funchal; 12 January 2019 - Present	Incumbent
