= Ilse Everlien Berardo =

German Lutheran theologian

The Reverend Ilse Everlien Berardo Pastor
- Pastor of the German-Speaking Evangelical Parish of Madeira
- Church: Evangelical-Lutheran Church of Hanover (Evangelical Church in Germany)
- In office: 2011 to present
- Predecessor: Post created
- Other post: Preacher (1984-2011)

Orders
- Ordination: 24 July 2011 by Bishop Martin Hein
- Rank: Pastor

Personal details
- Born: Ilse Everlien; 28 December 1955 (age 70) Einbeck, Lower Saxony, Germany
- Denomination: Lutheranism
- Residence: Funchal
- Parents: Henny Everlien (mother); Karl Everlien (father)
- Spouse: Jorge Sabino Rodrigues Berardo
- Children: 3, including Rubina Berardo
- Occupation: Theologian
- Education: University of Marburg

Ilse Everlien Berardo (born 28 December 1955) is a German Lutheran theologian, responsible for the German-speaking Protestant Church on Madeira Island. She is the first woman to become pastor of the Lutheran Church in Madeira, in 500 years of Christian presence on the island.

She was ordained in July 2011, by the Bishop of Kassel, Martin Hein.

== Early life and education ==
Ilse Berardo was born in Einbeck, Lower Saxony to Henny Everlien and Karl Everlien, an engineer.

While in high school she volunteered as a Lutheran catechist in at the local parish, a role that she holds until she enrolls in University of Marburg in order to study Theology, in 1974.

Berardo graduates in 1981, having presented her bachelor's thesis to the Evangelical Lutheran Church in Brunswick, in the city of Wolfenbüttel.

== Ministry ==
Ilse Berardo started out as a preacher of Madeira's Lutheran church in 1987 when the German-Speaking Evangelical Parish was established. At the time she had a special license issued by the bishop to officiate celebrations.

While in Madeira Berardo has always been active at the local Lutheran church on a voluntary basis. The main dignitaries from the Lutheran Church in Portugal, as well as the Lutheran auxiliary bishop of Hannover, came to her ordination ceremony in recognition of her religious commitment to the local German community.

As a Pastor, Isle is also known for her extensive network of ecumenical contacts in Madeira Island. The intensity of these well-established relations was demonstrated when representatives of the Roman Catholic Church, the Anglican Church and the Presbyterian Church in Madeira attended her ordination.

Ilse has also celebrated several ecumenical masses along with the local Anglican and Roman Catholic Churches.

=== 500 Years of the Reformation ===
As pastor of the German Evangelical Church in Madeira, Ilse Berardo participated in the celebrations of the 500th anniversary of the Reformation, promoted through a partnership between the German Evangelical Church in Madeira and the University of Madeira. These celebrations were attended by the Vicar-General of the Diocese of Funchal, who officially represented Bishop António Carrilho.

During the event, Ilse Berardo highlighted that the Reformation brought a change of mentalities that permeated various fields, particularly in education and in social rights, while stressing that "the Christian Church as a whole needs even more unity" to respond to the challenges of modern life.

=== 2019 Madeira bus crash ===
Following the 2019 Madeira bus crash, Pastor Everlien Berardo was one of the first leaders of the German expat community living on the island to assist the injured once they got to the Central Hospital of Funchal. Ilse helped local authorities as interpreter and counselor. She would later participate in an ecumenical mass, together with Nuno I, Roman Catholic Bishop of Funchal, in a joint prayer for the mortal victims of the accident, organized by the Santa Cruz Municipality.

== Family ==
Ilse married Jorge Sabino Rodrigues Berardo on June 18, 1982, therefore becoming sister-in-law to one of Portugal's richest men: Joe Berardo.

She is a mother to two sons and one daughter, Rubina Berardo, the latter was a member of the Portuguese Assembly of the Republic.

== Honours ==
- Cross of the Order or Merit of the Federal Republic of Germany (11 February 2022) for more than 30 years of services in providing support to every German citizen who asks for its help on the island.
