= Anastácio Alves =

Madeiran Roman Catholic priest

José Anastácio Alves
- Church: Catholic Church
- Archdiocese: Patriarchate of Lisbon
- Province: Lisbon
- Diocese: Funchal
- Previous post: Priest of the Portuguese Parish of Gentilly (2012–2018)

Orders
- Ordination: 28 July 1990 by Bishop Teodoro de Faria of Funchal
- Rank: Priest
- Laicized: 23 June 2021

Personal details
- Born: 1963 (age 62–63) Santa Cruz, Madeira, Portugal

José Anastácio Alves (born 1963) is a missing Madeiran Roman Catholic priest who exercised ecclesiastical functions in the Portuguese Parish of Gentilly, Val-de-Marne, from 2012 until 2018, before being removed from office in June that year by the Bishop of Funchal due to allegations of child abuse.

== Priesthood ==
Anastácio Alves was ordained in the Cathedral of Funchal by Bishop Teodoro Faria, on 28 July 1990, along with José Tolentino Mendonça.

After his ordination as priest, he was assigned to the Parish of Quinta Grande, where he exercised his office between 1992 and 1999. In 1999 he was transferred to Parish Nazaré, in São Martinho, where he worked until 2008.

In 2008, Alves requested to be transferred to Portuguese Catholic Mission in Switzerland, in order to provide "spiritual support" to the Portuguese community living in that country and to further pursue his Theology studies in the University of Fribourg. Bishop Carrilho approved the transfer. Alves' parishioners in Nazaré spoke out against his "sudden" departure.

Alves lived in Switzerland for four years before returning to the Portuguese Parish of Gentilly. On July 24, 2018, he was removed from office in Gentilly by the Portuguese Conference of Bishops in response to an investigation of child abuse initiated in Madeira by the Public Ministry and the Diocese of Funchal.

=== Child abuse ===
In 2005, when Bishop Teodoro de Faria was still head of the Diocese of Funchal, Alves was reported to the police as a child abuser and was made arguido the Public Ministry. This case was closed due to lack of evidence in 2007, when Alves was in charge of the Parish of Nazaré.

One year after the case his closed, the recently arrived Bishop Carilho announced that Alves has requested him to be transferred to Switzerland.

On 24 July 2018, the Portuguese Conference of Bishops removed Alves from office in France in response to another alleged child abuse case being investigated in Madeira. On September 2, the same year, Bishop Carrilho suspended Alves from all ecclesiastical duties, announcing a "zero tolerance" policy and vowing to send all investigation reports and conclusions to the Congregation for the Doctrine of the Faith, in accordance with Canon Law.

The diocese has made several attempts to contact him pertaining to the child abuse investigation, but his whereabouts remain unknown. In late 2019, Alves sent a letter to the diocese "asking to be released from his priestly duties", though he refrained from disclosing his location or explaining his absence.

On 23 June 2021, the Pope Francis "acceded to the request" of Anastácio Alves for "dispensation from the obligations inherent to Holy Ordination, including priestly celibacy". Having failed to contact the said priest in order to inform him of the decision, the Diocese of Funchal "was instructed by the Congregation for the Doctrine of the Faith to make the Pope's decision public.".

== See also ==
- List of people who disappeared mysteriously: post-1970
