= Aires de Ornelas e Vasconcelos =

19th-century Roman Catholic bishop in Portuguese India

- Archbishop of Goa; Bishop of Funchal
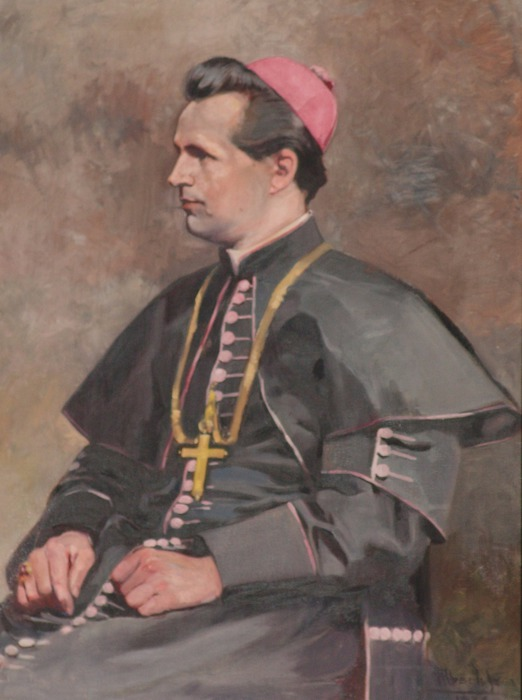

Personal details
- Born: 18 September 1837 Funchal, Madeira, Portugal
- Died: 28 November 1880 (aged 43) Goa, Portuguese India (now part of India)
- Coat of arms

Aires de Ornelas e Vasconcelos (18 September 1837 – 28 November 1880) was a Portuguese Roman Catholic Archbishop of Goa.

He was born September 18, 1837, in Funchal, Madeira, Portugal, a son of Aires de Ornelas e Vasconcelos Esmeraldo Rolim de Moura and wife Augusta Correia Vasques Salvago de Brito de Olival. On March 6, 1871, he was appointed coadjutor Bishop of Funchal, a diocese in Portugal, and on May 7, 1871, he was ordained as such. On October 27, 1872, he succeeded as Bishop of Funchal, after the death of the previous bishop, Patrício Xavier de Moura. He served as Archbishop of Goa for 6 years, from July 23, 1874, to his death on November 28, 1880.

== Family ==
D. Aires de Ornelas e Vasconcelos was the son of Aires de Ornelas e Vasconcelos Esmeraldo Rolim de Moura and his wife Augusta Correia Vasques Salvago de Brito de Olival, second brother of Agostinho de Ornelas e Vasconcelos Esmeraldo Rolim de Moura e Teive and paternal uncle of his namesake Aires de Ornelas e Vasconcelos, 1st Lord of Dornelas and Caniço. He was baptized in the Cathedral of Funchal.

== Life ==
He was appointed bishop-coadjutor of Funchal, and was consecrated as titular bishop of Gérasa on 7 May 1871, by the bishop of Funchal, Frei Patrício Xavier de Moura e Brito, O.S.A., at the Convent of Inglesinhos in Lisbon. In 1872, he succeeded as Bishop of Funchal.

Appointed Archbishop of Goa on 23 July 1874, a post he held for six years until his death on 28 November 1880.[2] During his prelacy in Goa, he was a member of the Governing Council of Portuguese India in 1877 and in 1878.

He was co-consignor of the Cardinal Patriarch of Lisbon D. José Sebastião de Almeida Neto.

In 1882, his first-born brother published his works, which he preceded by a biographical notice (it was this work that gave him entry to the Royal Academy of Sciences of Lisbon).

Styles of Aires de Ornelas e Vasconcelos
- Reference style: His Most Reverend Excellency
- Spoken style: Your Excellency; Dom Aires
- Religious style: Archebishop

Catholic Church titles
Preceded by Patrício Xavier de Moura	Bishop of Funchal; 1872–1874	Succeeded by Manuel Agostinho Barreto
Preceded by João Crisóstomo de Amorim Pessoa	Archbishop of Goa; 1874–1880	Succeeded by António Sebastião Valente
