= Igreja do Colégio =

Igreja do Colégio, Portuguese for "church of the college", may refer to:

- Igreja de São João Evangelista, church in Funchal, Portugal
- Church of the Jesuit College (Ponta Delgada), church in Ponta Delgada, Portugal
