= Martinho de Portugal =

Portuguese archbishop

The Most Illustrious and Reverend Lord, Dom Martinho I
- Archbishop of Funchal, Primate of the Indies and all new lands discovered and to be discovered.
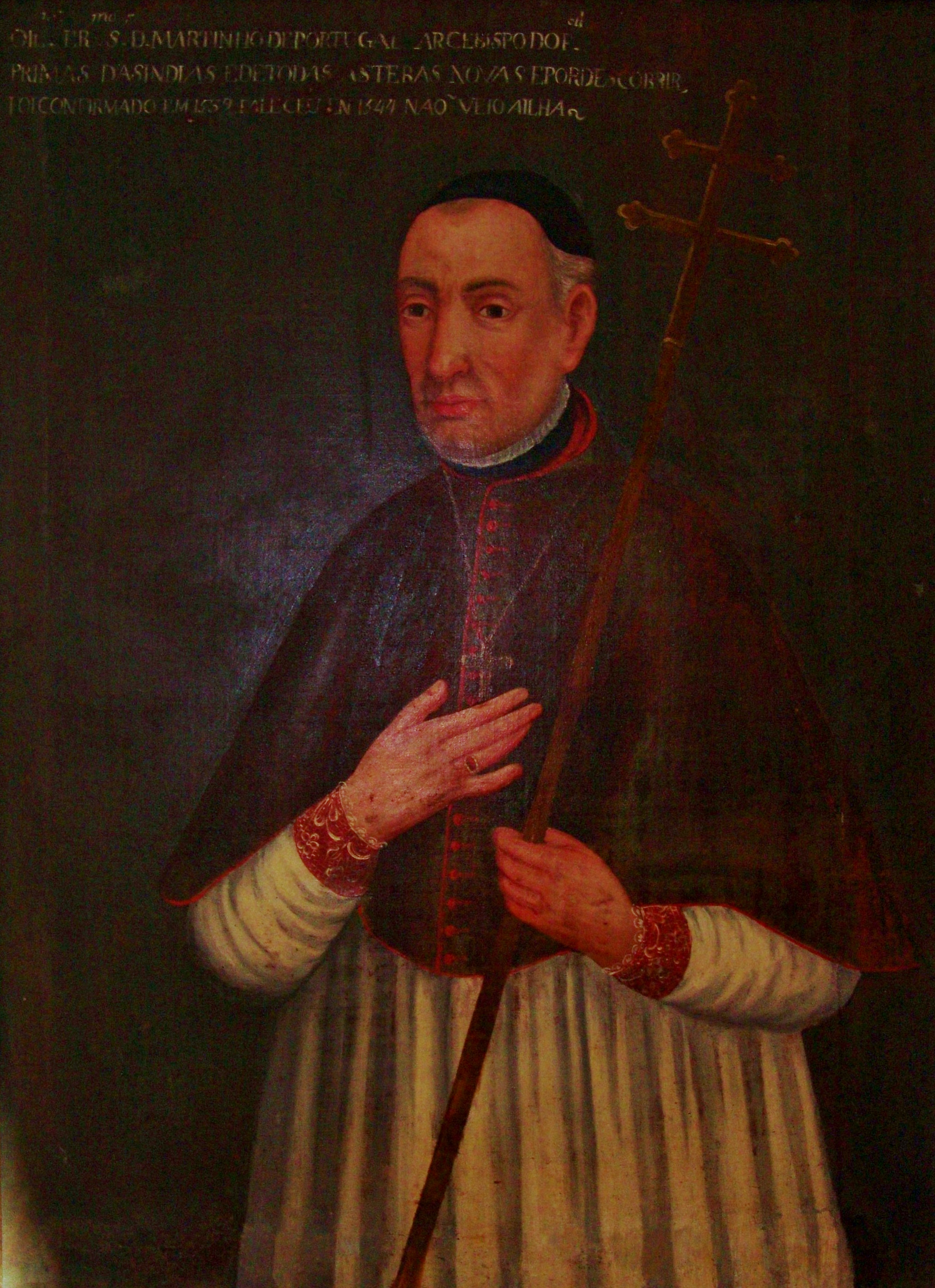
- Portrait of Archbishop Martinho de Portugal
- Church: Catholic Church
- Archdiocese: Funchal
- Province: Funchal
- Metropolis: Funchal
- Diocese: Funchal
- See: Funchal
- Appointed: 10 February 1953
- Installed: 10 February 1533
- Term ended: 15 November 1547
- Predecessor: Diogo Pinheiro
- Successor: Gaspar do Casal
- Previous post: Apostolic Nuncio to Portugal

Orders
- Ordination: 17 Aug 1533 by Cardinal Girolamo Grimaldi
- Rank: Bishop

Personal details
- Born: Martinho de Portugal; 1485 Évora
- Died: 15 November 1547 (aged 61–62)
- Parents: Afonso of Portugal; Filipa de Macedo
- Children: Eliseu de Portugal; Cecília de Portugal

Dom Martinho de Portugal (1485 - 15 November 1547), also known as Martinho of Portugal, was a Portuguese archbishop, the only Archbishop of Funchal, holder of the largest Catholic jurisdiction in the world, ever created, which had as suffragans the dioceses like Angra do Heroísmo, São Tomé, Santiago and Goa. From its area, the future Diocese (today Archdiocese) of São Salvador da Bahia, would be dismembered and created in 1551.

== Biography ==
He was the son of Afonso de Portugal, ecclesiastical bishop of Évora, and Filipa de Macedo. Due to his paternal line, he was a descendant of João I of Portugal. Thus, he was brother of the 1st Count of Vimioso, Francis of Portugal.

== Ecclesiastic career ==
=== Portugal ===
His aristocratic background, despite being marked by illegitimacy, would be decisive for his career, which began with the completion of a solid program of theological studies, which started in Lisbon and continued in Valladolid and Paris, following the which he related to important figures of European humanism, with emphasis on Erasmus, to whom he was introduced in 1520.

In 1522 Martinho returns to Portugal, and through his family links is given an canonical stipend the chancellorship of the Cathedral of Évora, which was at the time led by his father. He cumulated these benefits with the priory of the church of Barcelos and the commendation of the Monastery of Saint George, in Coimbra

In 1523, he governed the diocese of Viseu in the name of Afonso de Portugal, until the arrival of its Bishop João de Chaves.

=== Rome ===
In 1525 he was sent to Rome as a Portuguese ambassador. He would later be appointed apostolic nuncio by Pope Clement VII to King João III with powers of legacy a latere in the kingdoms and domains of the Portuguese crown.

In Martinho was sent back to the pontifical court in 1532, this time in charge of opening negotiations with the aim of achieving the establishment of the Inquisition in Portugal.

==== Appointment as Archbishop of Funchal ====
On February 10, 1533, while in Rome, Martinho is appointed as archbishop of Funchal, following the concession of the category of metropolitan to the ecclesiastical province of Funchal, obtained from Clement VII on January 31 of the same year.

Nevertheless, the bulls that would make the elevation of Martinho were not issued, which may have been due, on one hand, to his condition as an illegitimate son and, on the other, to some unavailability of King João III in honouring the financial charges that he was obliged to when nominating Martinho for the position. At that time, in order to elevate the ecclesiastical circumscription of Funchal to a metropolis, the king had committed himself to increase the archbishop's income by 200,000 réis, that is, to double the remuneration previously attributed to the Bishop of Funchal, therefore, generating new expenses for the Crown.

Martinho would later complain about the omission of such bulls in 1535, and because of it, the actual existence of the archdiocese of Funchal was questioned. Despite such bureaucratic constraints, Martinho assumed the title of Archbishop of Funchal, Primate of the Indies and all new lands discovered and to be discovered.

===== Reasons for the appointment =====
The circumstances underlying the monarch's will to allow the appointment as Archbishop would be linked to the desire to reward services previously provided by Martinho, and to favour his predisposition to act in the strict defence of the royal interests regarding the establishment of the Inquisition in Portugal.

Nevertheless, Martinho's action in Rome was apparently more oriented towards the search for a legitimation of his birth that in turn would allow his promotion to Cardinal, than centred on the mission that the monarch had entrusted to him.

The creation of Martinho as Archbishop of Funchal was also rooted on the need to find a structure that, without disturbing the position of any of the other two national metropolitans, that of Braga and the Lisbon, would authorize the establishment of several overseas dioceses and promote ecclesiastical decentralization in the new territories of the empire. Such was immediately accomplished between 1533 and 1534 the dioceses of Cape Verde, S. Tomé, Goa and Angra were created.

Later, in 1547, he was elected bishop of the Algarve, but he was not confirmed, because he died before taking office.

=== Funchal ===
Despite never having personally visited Madeira, the seat of his archdiocese, Martinho de Portugal did not neglect the responsibilities that his position entailed.

==== Human resources ====
As archbishop he ordered the creation of two new canonries, four new chaplaincies and one sacristan, with the aiming of improving the living conditions of the islanders and local clergy.

==== Representatives in the Archdiocese ====
Recognizing that his absence could jeopardize the normal function of the archdiocese, Martinho sent the Bishop of Rociona, D. Ambrósio Brandão, to Madeira, in 1538, accompanied by two visitors, Jordão Jorge and Álvaro Dias, “chaplain, familiar and continuous dinner of the Most Illustrious and Reverend Lord D. Martinho de Portugal”.

Shortly after arriving to Madeira, D. Ambrósio neglected the tasks that were assigned to him, performing ordinations all over the Island in the second half of the year and, having finished his duties, he returned to mainland Portugal. The same did not happen with the visitors, who remained until the following year, also visiting the parishes and taking steps to correct the non-conformities they encountered. The performance of the visitors was not well received by the Madeiran faithful, historical sources affirm that they “carried out their office throughout the island, not with that kindness in which the Bishopric was created, but rather with much rigour and harshness”, reason why they were “disliked” by the population.

===== Ecclesiastical inspections =====
During the time of their stay, the visitors appointed by Martinho de Portugal reported the following non-conformities and threatened those who practised them with excommunication: speaking during masses, singing, dancing and sleeping in church.

As for the Madeiran clergy the visitors appointed by Martinho were expected to persevere in teaching doctrine to the faithful, to be vigilant in relation to unmarried couples and to those who married illegally, to ring the bell three times a day, to be concerned with cleaning the altars and vestments.

==== Relics ====
In an effort to promote the status of his archdiocese, Martinho de Portugal sent to Funchal religious relics to be stored in the cathedral's altar.

== Family life ==
He fathered two children, with Catarina de Sousa:

- Eliseu de Portugal
- Cecília de Portugal

== Death ==
Martinho died in November 15, 1547, he died, before being able to take office as Bishop of Silves. With him the Archdiocese of Funchal disappeared, which, as early as 1539, had been amputated from its jurisdiction over the East, whose lands, from the Cape of Good Hope, came to be under the direct control of the Diocese of Goa. The Archdiocese of Funchal would be formally extinct in 1551.
