= Francisco Antunes Santana =

His Excellency, The Most Reverend Dom Francisco II
- Bishop of Funchal
- Church: Catholic Church
- Archdiocese: Patriarchate of Lisbon
- Province: Lisbon
- Diocese: Funchal
- See: Funchal
- Appointed: 18 March 1974
- Installed: 21 March 1974
- Term ended: 5 March 1982
- Predecessor: João III
- Successor: Teodoro

Orders
- Ordination: 29 June 1948 by Manuel II, Cardinal-Patriarch of Lisbon
- Consecration: 21 March 1974 by António II, Cardinal-Patriarch of Lisbon

Personal details
- Born: Francisco Antunes Santana Lisbon, Portugal
- Died: 5 March 1982 Funchal, Madeira, Portugal
- Parents: António Francisco Santana; Ana de Jesus Santana

Dom Francisco Antunes Santana (11 October 1924 – 5 March 1982), officially known as Francisco II, was Bishop of Funchal during 1974 and 1982, having a key role in the political process in Madeira at the time of the Carnation Revolution.

== Life and career ==
Francisco II was born in Lisbon on October 10, 1924 to António Francisco Santana and Ana de Jesus Santana.

He was ordained by Cardinal Cerejeira on 29 June 1948, after which he took the position as teacher in the seminary of Santarém and as priest in several parishes of Lisbon.

He then became National Director of the Apostleship of the Sea in 1960. From 1979 onward he worked as a monitor-operator for Lisnave shipyards since, and participated on numerous missions abroad.

He was elected bishop of Funchal on March 18, 1974, and episcopal ordination on the 21st of the same month. However, he was forced to delay his arrival to Madeira due to the Revolution. He would make his solemn entry into the see of Funchal on May 12, 1974. In that and that summer his was kidnapped at Funchal's seminary premises.

In February 1981 he was hospitalized, due to cancer, in Funchal and would later undergo surgery in London. He would later die in the episcopal palace of Funchal on March 5, 1982.

== Political legacy ==
It is attributed to Francisco II the launch of Alberto João Jardim's political career, who would become President of the Regional Government of Madeira for 37 years, the longest time in office for an elected Portuguese politician. Such was due to the fact that Francisco II choose João Jardim, on October 24, 1974, to be the director of the Diocese's newspaper, who then became a mouthpiece to the Church's anti-communist and anti-socialist sentiment in revolution's aftermath, therefore influencing the political set-up of Madeira in the early years of Autonomy.

During his time in office he frequently attack Communism and Socialism during his masses by stating that: "marxist socialism, where the agents of international communism cleverly hide, intends to assault our archipelago of Madeira to colonize it" and by calling Communism an utopia.
