= Afonso of Portugal (bishop) =

Portuguese Catholic bishop

His Most Reverend Excellency, Dom Afonso
- Bishop of Évora
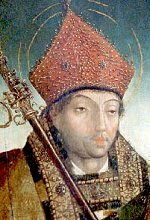
- Church: Catholic Church
- Province: Lisbon
- Metropolis: Lisbon
- Diocese: Évora
- See: Évora
- Appointed: 18 January 1486
- Predecessor: Garcia Menezes
- Successor: Afonso of Portugal

Orders
- Consecration: by Bishop Pedro Vaz Gaviso Velasci
- Rank: Bishop

Personal details
- Born: Afonso de Portugal; 1440
- Died: 24 April 1522 (aged 81–82)

Dom Afonso of Portugal (1440 - 24 April 1522), also known as Afonso de Portugal, was the 43rd Bishop of Évora from 1485 until his death.

He was the son of Afonso of Braganza (also known as Afonso of Portugal), Marquis of Valença, firstborn of Afonso I, Duke of Bragança, therefore great-grandson of King John I of Portugal.

Although forced to follow an ecclesiastical career by King John II of Portugal, as Bishop of Évora, he had issue with Filipa de Macedo, daughter of João Gonçalves de Macedo, 1st Lord of Melgaço, and his second wife Isabel Gomes Rebelo:

- Francisco of Portugal (c. 1485 - Évora, 8 December 1549), 1st Count of Vimioso;
- Martinho of Portugal (c. 1485 - Lisbon, 15 November 1547), Archbishop of Funchal;
- Brites of Portugal.

Filipa de Macedo came to marry Rui or Manuel Drago, son of another Rui Drago, but the children of this couple have always said they were children of Bishop D. Afonso, which is why they took the name Drago of Portugal, namely:

- Rui Drago of Portugal, first married to Briolanja Teixeira, with issue, and second time married to Bernarda or Branca Martins Boto, with issue, and with natural issue;
- Filipa Drago of Portugal.
