= Joe Berardo =

Portuguese and South African businessman, investor and art collector (born 1944)

Joe Berardo GCIH, ComIH
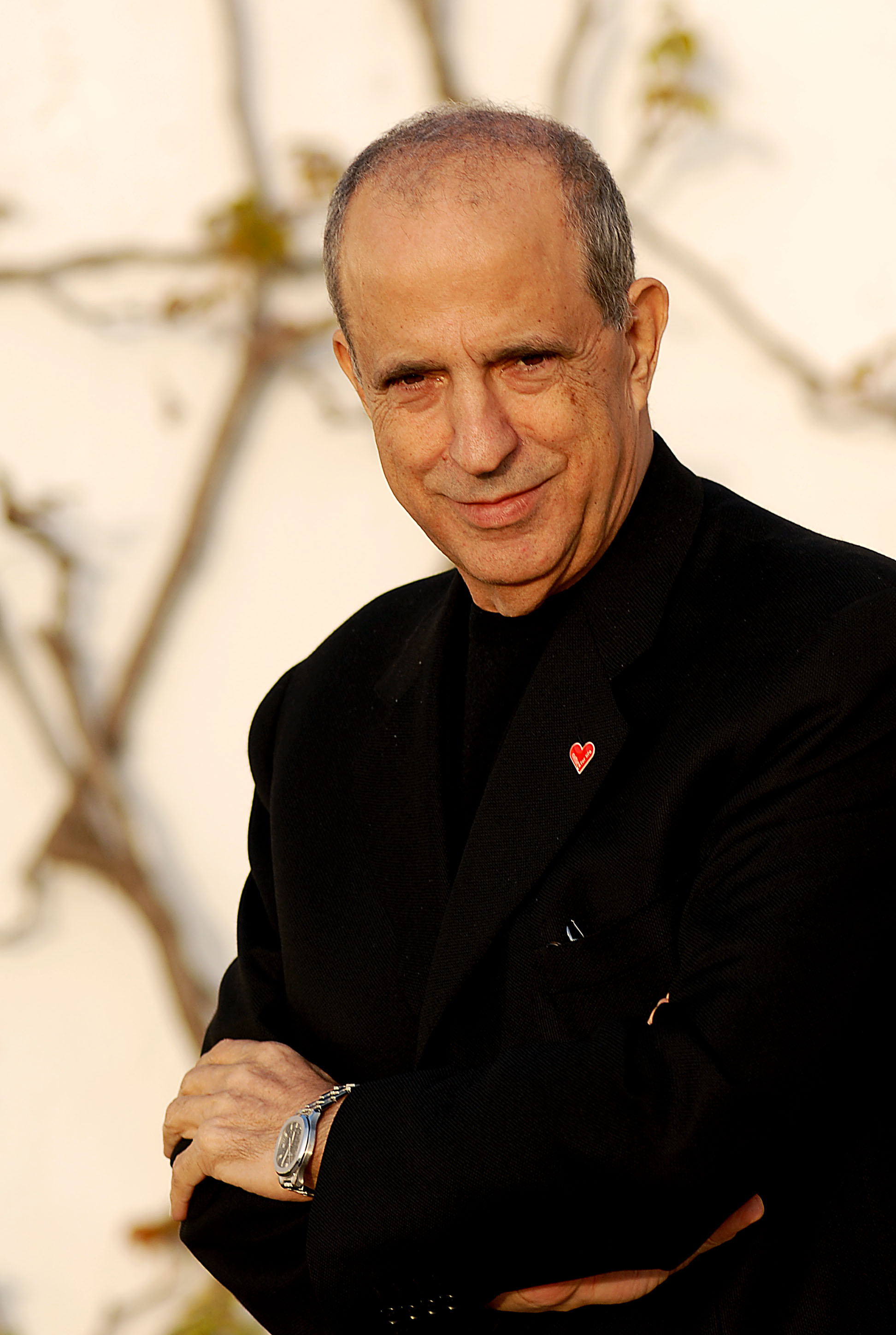
- Born: José Manuel Rodrigues Berardo; 4 July 1944 (age 81); Santa Luzia, Madeira, Portugal
- Occupations: Businessman, investor, and art collector
- Spouse: Carolina da Conceição Gonçalves (m. 1969)
- Children: 2
- Relatives: Ilse Everlien Berardo (sister-in-law); Rubina Berardo (niece)

José Manuel Rodrigues "Joe" Berardo GCIH, ComIH (born 4 July 1944), is a Portuguese and South African businessman, investor, and art collector. According to Portuguese magazine Exame, he had an estimated net worth of €598 million in 2010, making him one of the wealthiest people in Portugal at the time. Starting around the 2010–2014 Portuguese financial crisis when both the Portuguese Republic finances and banking system collapsed, he has been involved in several controversies and legal issues which have led to the freezing of his bank accounts, his companies' assets and himself due to ongoing legal investigations.

== Life ==
=== Early life ===
Berardo was born in 1944 at Santa Luzia, Funchal, Madeira, Portugal, the son of Manuel Berardo Gomes and Ana Rodrigues. Berardo left school when he was 13 years old and got a low-ranked job in the winery sector of Madeira wine. At the age of 18, he emigrated to South Africa where he worked in horticulture distribution and eventually set up large commercial ventures, becoming at the end of the 20th century one of the most renowned and wealthiest Portuguese entrepreneurs. In South Africa, he created Egoli Consolidated Mines Ltd, a gold extraction company. Initially, the gold extraction was performed using low-value waste lands that were apparently being ignored. Later, the mining company started to deal with diamond mining as well. Berardo returned to Portugal in 1986.

=== Return to Portugal ===
As a very wealthy stock investor, Joe Berardo was a central personality on the Portuguese stock exchange in the 2000s, and became noted for his remarks as activist shareholder and the media frenzy it generated at times. His businesses included hotels, tobacco, animal food, telecommunications, banking and wines. Berardo's estimated total wealth, including stock in large Portuguese banking and telecommunications companies, was at a time at over €1.9 billion.

Berardo made long-term investments in large companies such as Millennium BCP bank and Portugal Telecom (PT) telecommunications operator, which were both listed on the Euronext Lisbon. In 2006, he took a prominent part in the struggle against Sonae.com's very publicized takeover bid over Portugal Telecom. Sonae.com's takeover bid opposing Belmiro de Azevedo (founder and historical chairman of Sonae holding company) and his son Paulo Azevedo (head officer of Sonae.com telecommunications operator at the time) to the investor Berardo and PT's administrators Zeinal Bava and Henrique Granadeiro, failed.

In June 2007, Berardo made a bid for 60% of Sport Lisboa e Benfica - Futebol, S.A.D.'s shares at €3.50 a share, a 30% premium to the recent share price. But the price was well below the €5 a share set at Benfica's IPO in May 2007, when after an initial flurry of optimism the shares fell steadily to below €3 apiece, hammered hard by the team's fourth-place finish in the Portuguese Liga and the failure to make any great gains in European competition. Berardo's bid was not hostile, as reports said the Benfica management had been informed in advance and was generally in favor of the offer. Overall, the bid was worth some €31.5 million and was conditional on Berardo netting 50% of the company plus one share, to ensure control. The bid valued S.L. Benfica - Futebol, S.A.D. at €52.5 million. However, Berardo did not exclude a major stake in the Futebol, S.A.D., which could have been achieved within the 33% free float of publicly traded stock that was issued in the stock market in May 2007. Berardo, who is a paying member of S.L. Benfica (sócio) and a declared supporter of the club, failed to become the largest individual stockholder in the club's S.A.D., since only about 1% of the intended stock was sold to him as of the 20 August 2007 deadline.

After his failed attempt to bid on Benfica, Berardo refocused his attention on his hometown club Club Sport Marítimo, of which has also declared his support for and is a registered member also. On 17 November 2007, during the club's 97th anniversary celebration, he was honoured with a silver medal to commemorate his 25 years as a Marítimo member. He used the occasion to announce his interest in the clubs' new stadium plans, the Estádio do Marítimo, and offer his aid as a "supporter with passion" for the club.

== Art collection ==
Berardo is one of the leading contemporary art collectors in Portugal. An inveterate collector, he started as a schoolboy with stamps, postcards and matchboxes, and later transitioned to modern and contemporary art in the 1980s. His various collections, which include art deco and Chinese porcelain, encompass more than 40,000 works, of which some 1,200 are by well-known modern and contemporary artists with a reported value of $750 million. Much of his art collection has in the past been used as collateral to borrow from banks.

Berardo went public with his collection in 1997, displaying works at an old casino in Sintra, and then at the Centro Cultural de Belém cultural center, in Lisbon. By agreement with the Portuguese Government, a foundation (Fundação de Arte Moderna e Contemporânea—Colecção Berardo) was created to support the housing of his art collection of roughly 1,800 works at the Centro Cultural de Belém. Much as the Spanish state did with the Thyssen-Bornemisza Museum in Madrid, the government agreed to house part of his collection and took a 10-year option to buy 862 paintings and sculptures for 316 million euros, based on a Christie's valuation in 2006. The Museu Colecção Berardo was inaugurated on 25 June 2007. Berardo's 35-hectare sculpture park in Quinta dos Loridos, north of Lisbon, opened in phases since 2006. When he read about the Taliban’s destruction of Afghanistan's enormous stone Buddhas in Bamiyan in 2001, he bought a massive range of Buddhist statues, and created the Buddha Eden Gardens (about 45 minutes outside of Lisbon). In 2011, Berardo set up the Aliança Underground Museum, a paid (5€ minimum) exhibition of tiles, ethnographic art, ceramics, minerals and fossils in an unused tunnel on a winemaker's property in Sangalhos. In 2012, an exhibition of works from Berardo's Modern and contemporary collection, including pieces by Gerhard Richter, Francis Bacon and Andy Warhol, was on show at the Gary Nader Art Centre in Miami, Florida.

== Controversies and legal issues ==
Throughout his life, Berardo has been related to several controversial situations that have reached the media:

- In 1990, Berardo was summoned to the Commission of Inquiry van Zyl for the illegal export of cycads, diverting them from the Transvaal to Madeira, and declared the value of the plants for less than one tenth of the value their purchase. The same Commission points to a close relationship between Berardo and Apartheid leader and Foreign Minister Pik Botha as facilitator of these operations.
- In 2007, he increased his stake in BCP using a € 1 billion loan in the context of a "war" for power with the other shareholders. Suspicious links have been reported with the funding banks - BCP, of which it is the chairman of the Compensation and Welfare Board, CGD and BES - which have done so against a guarantee of only 75% of the Berardo Collection (valued at 316 million euros in 2007)
- In 2008, Berardo appeared in the press related to the real estate speculation that he would have made in the Alvor River (located in the Monchique Range), having the price of the Quinta da Rocha estate passed from 500 thousand to 14 million euros.

=== CGD Affair ===
- In 2009, he was not required to regularize the interest of the 2007 loan, by the new management of Caixa Geral de Depósitos (CGD), since if this were not done, the guarantees would have to be activated with the result that the state bank, given the financial vehicle used, would hold a very significant stake (10%) of BCP.
- On 1 February 2012, it was declared by CGD, Banco Espírito Santo and Banco Comercial Português that they had given up the money they owed.
- In 2019, it became public that Berardo owes 980 million euros to Banco Comercial Português, Novo Banco and CGD. This prompted the Assembly of the Republic to hold an inquiry of Berardo, within the inquiry committee on the CGD bank's management, after which the Portuguese parliament decided to forward Berardo's declarations to the Public Ministry, in order to start the investigation on potential crimes committed.
  - In June CGD requested in court, obtained favourable decision, the arrestment of Berardo's assets and bank accounts owned by his company. The court resorted to the uncommon procedure of disregarding of the collective legal personality of Berardo's company.
  - In July Berardo's 10 million euro real estate, owned through Berardo Foundation, Monte Palace Gardens, located in Funchal, was also put under interlocutory injunction. Under this injunction it is impossible for Berardo, or his foundation, to sell the property until its market value is determined and how his debt is to be paid.

=== Arrest ===
In June 2021, Berardo became a named suspect (arguido status in the Portuguese legal system) and was arrested by members of the Polícia Judiciária for alleged fraud committed against the bank Caixa Geral de Depósitos (CGD) and a number of other financial crimes.

== Honours and awards ==
=== National honours ===
- Commander of the Order of Prince Henry, Portugal (13 March 1985)
- Grand-Cross of the Order of Prince Henry, Portugal (4 October 2004)

==== Disciplinary procedure ====
Under the CGD affair, the Portuguese Orders National Council was convened on 17 May 2019, presided by Manuela Ferreira Leite, to initiate a disciplinary procedure on whether the President of the Republic should or not strip Berardo from the ranks of the Order of Prince Henry. The Council's President appointed the former President of the Assembly of the Republic, Mota Amaral, to lead the investigation related to disciplinary procedure, which included collection of written and audio material from the Portuguese parliament's CDG Affair inquiry committee. The disciplinary procedure results are expected to be presented to Portuguese Orders National Council on 20 December 2019.

Since the disciplinary procedure was initiated, Berardo has publicly apologized for his conduct during the Assembly of the Republic's inquiry.

== See also ==
- Novo Banco
