= Rubina Berardo =

Portuguese politician

Her Excellency Rubina Everlien Berardo

Member of the Assembly of the Republic
- In office 23 October 2015 – 25 October 2019
- Preceded by: Guilherme Silva
- Succeeded by: Sérgio Marques
- Parliamentary group: Social Democratic Party
- Constituency: Madeira
- Majority: Socialist Party

Vice-President of Social Democratic Party's Parliamentary Group
- In office 22 February 2018 – 25 October 2019

Personal details
- Born: 11 November 1982 (age 43) Funchal, Madeira, Portugal
- Party: Social Democratic Party
- Spouse: Divorced
- Children: Ben
- Parents: Jorge Sabino Rodrigues Berardo (father); Ilse Everlien Berardo (mother)
- Relatives: Joe Berardo (Uncle)
- Education: University of East Anglia; London School of Economics
- Occupation: Economist, politician and columnist
- Profession: Civil servant
- Committees: European Affairs; Foreign Policy and Portuguese Communities; Agriculture and Sea
- Website: Official Facebook Page

Rubina Everlien Berardo (born 11 November 1982) is a Madeiran and Portuguese politician and pundit who was a Social Democratic Party (PSD) Member of the Assembly of the Republic for the constituency of Madeira between 2015 and 2019. Since February 2018, she is one of the vice-presidents of her party's parliamentary group in the Assembly of the Republic.

== Education ==
She is an economist by training, having studied at the University of East Anglia (BA politics and economics, 2003), the London School of Economics (M.Sc. European politics and governance, 2004), and at the Portuguese Military Academy, where she studied information warfare and competitive intelligence.

== Civil service career ==
=== In Madeira ===
Before being elected as a member of the Assembly of the Republic, Rubina Berardo worked as civil servant for the Regional Government of Madeira in the department of European Affairs and External Cooperation since December 2005, a post she still holds.

=== German diplomatic career ===
Between 2012 and 2015 she became deputy counsellor for economic affairs and press in the German Embassy in Lisbon.

== Political career ==
Before being elected to the Assembly of the Republic, Rubina Berardo was an active member in the national and regional Social Democratic Youth, having run, unsuccessfully, for president of the latter in 2011.

In October 2015, she was elected member of the Assembly of the Republic, for the constituency of Madeira, and assumed membership of the parliamentary committees for European Affairs and for Budget, Finances and Administrative Modernization. In representation of her constituency, Rubina Berardo has integrated the Commission of Inquiry to the process that led to the sale and settlement of Banco Internacional do Funchal (Banif).

Four years later, in July 2019, the Madeiran newspaper, JM-Madeira, announced that Berardo was not running for re-election to the Assembly of the Republic. The decision for non-re-election to the Portuguese Parliament came from PSD-Madeira's president, Miguel Albuquerque, and the regional party's Political Commission as a result from the negotiations made with PSD regarding the Closed lists.

=== Political views ===
==== LGBT rights ====
Contrary to the mainstream ideology of her party, Rubina Berardo voted in favour of LGBT adoption, and surrogacy during her term as member of the Portuguese parliament.

==== Abortion ====
Despite her stance on certain civil rights, Rubina has been a member of pro-life movement throughout her political career, having supported the movement "Sociedade Civil da Madeira Junta pela Vida" (Madeira Civil Society Unite for Life) in Madeira which campaigned No in the Portuguese abortion referendum in 2007.

==== Euthanasia ====
Following the proposals submitted, In February 2020, by left-wing (PAN, Left Bloc, Socialists and Greens) and liberal (IL) parties to the Assembly of the Republic on the legalization of euthanasia Berardo published an opinion article in JM-Madeira highly criticizing such proposals.

In accordance with her Lutheran and pro-life background and beliefs, Berardo argued that the parties involved in these proposals are forcing their own agendas on the issue and failing the promises made of more civil society debates after these proposals failed parliamentary approval in 2018.

She further questioned that parties' proposal regarding what is the precise moment when they consider that someone gives up their human dignity and thus must be subject to the process of euthanasia, because society, medicine and the state have failed such individual. In her view, such moment does not exist since human dignity is inalienable.

==== European Union affairs ====
Berardo advocates for Portugal's further integration in the European Union, while an increasing Madeira's political autonomy from the Portuguese central government. As a federalist she believes that social-economic development in Portugal is only achievable by giving regions more political power, instead of centralizing political power in Lisbon.

==== Foreign affairs ====
Berardo, again not following party's voting policy, became the only PSD member of parliament joining left-wing parties PAN, Left Bloc, Socialists and Greens on the vote condemning Equatorial Guinea, a member of CPLP, for "maintaining and applying death penalty".

=== "Double Subsidy" affair ===
April 2017, Portuguese media denounced the fact the parliamentarians representing the Autonomous Regions were benefiting from a duplication of subsidies to cover their air fare costs. Parliamentarians representing Madeira and Azores were entitled not only to benefit from the subsidy available to all tax residents of the Autonomous Regions, as well as to benefit from the subsidy made available by the Portuguese Parliament to cover transportation costs.

Unlike most of her colleagues, benefiting from the double subsidy, Rubina Berardo made clear to the press, that she never applied for the subsidy made available to tax residents, since it was her understanding that the subsidy provided by the Portuguese parliament is more than enough to cover the air fare costs relating to the travels to her constituency. Out of the 12 Parliamentarians representing the Autonomous Region, Rubina Berardo, was the only one to opt to apply for one, of the two, available subsidies.

== Columnist ==
Since her involvement in politics, Berardo has contributed as pundit for Portuguese magazines and newspapers such as Sábado, Diário de Notícias, Diário de Notícias da Madeira and JM-Madeira.

== Personal life ==
Rubina holds dual citizenship, from Portugal and (Germany). She is mother to only one son, from her previous marriage, Ben.

Her mother, Ilse Berardo, is a German Lutheran theologian, responsible for the German-speaking Protestant Church on Madeira, and her uncle Joe Berardo, a Portuguese businessman, stock investor, and art collector, is one of the wealthiest people in Portugal.

== Honours ==
Medal of Gratitude, In March 2022 the Armenian Ambassador to Portugal, Garen Nazarian, awarded Rubina Berardo this honour for the "principled stance on human rights issues, in April 2019, which led to the approval of the vote, by the Portuguese Parliament, which recognised the Armenian genocide perpetrated by the Ottoman Empire" in 1915.
