= Jerónimo Barreto (bishop) =

Portuguese clergyman and bishop

Jerónimo Barreto (born 1544 in Porto) was a Portuguese clergyman and bishop for the Roman Catholic Diocese of Funchal. He was ordained in 1573. He was appointed bishop of Faro in 1585. He died in 1589.
