= Childbirth Masses =

Traditional christmas mass in Madeira

Missas do Parto
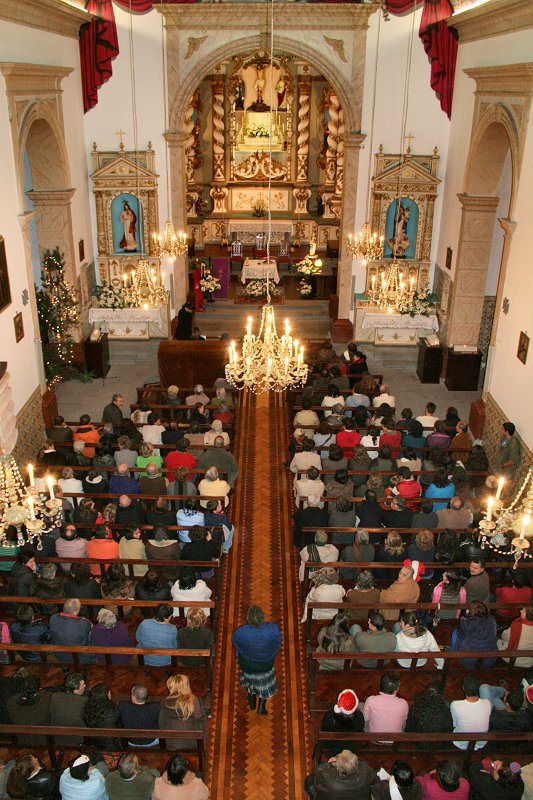
- Observed by: Catholics in the Autonomous Region of Madeira and diaspora
- Type: Religious
- Celebrations: Church services and gatherings
- Begins: 16 December
- Ends: 24 December
- Frequency: Annual
- Related to: Christmas

Missas do Parto (Portuguese for Childbirth Masses) are one of the greatest Christmas traditions of the Autonomous Region of Madeira in Portugal. They consist of nine masses celebrated in the novena before Christmas Day - from 16 to 24 December - in all the parishes of the Autonomous Region, at the end of the morning. They are a Marian devotion and celebrate the pregnancy of the Virgin Mary, in the figure of Our Lady of Ó who, in Madeira, is called Our Lady of Birth. After the Masses of the Childbirth there follows the Mass of the Rooster, on the night of 24 December.

These masses are highly attended, because besides the religious side, they have a profane, playful and recreational side. In them, the choir and the faithful sing the songs of the occasion. At the end of the liturgical act, the people gather in the churchyard together, share food and drink - hot drinks (hot cocoa, coffee), liquors, poncha, traditional Christmas sweets, sandwiches made with carne de vinha d'alhos - all while singing groups are formed and regional musical instruments are played, such as rajão, castanets, braguinha or machete, pandeiro, pife, bombo and the bagpipe or harmonica. Although it is less frequent nowadays, fireworks are also launched.

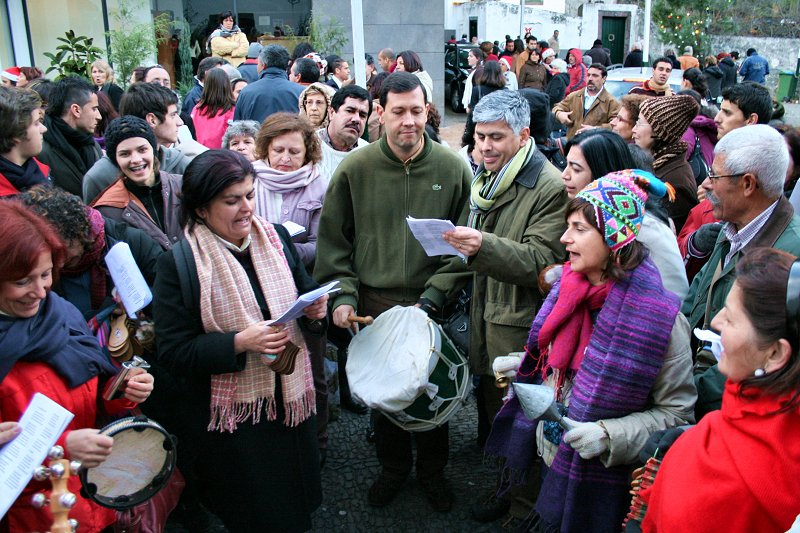
Traditional singing group gathering after a Childbirth Mass.

== History ==
The Childbirth Masses are an ancient and documented custom, at least since the beginning of the 18th century.

On 17 December the Church celebrates the Feast of the Expectation of the Blessed Virgin Mary, so called because the antiphons that are prayed in the so-called "Vespers", from that day to the 24th. The Church has fixed the Expectation of the Birth of the Blessed Virgin on the Feast of Our Lady of Ó. For this reason, from the eve of the feast of Our Lady of Ó (16 December) until Christmas Eve, the Madeiran Church celebrates the nine Masses of childbirth in honour of the Virgin for the divine childbirth that she will have, culminating in the Mass of the Rooster, honoring the birth of the Child. The Madeiran Masses of Childbirth are considered a local adaptation of the Novenas to the Child Jesus practiced in the 18th and 19th centuries in Northern Portugal.

Today most parishes begin celebrations on 16, but some already do so on 15 December.

The reason why these masses are held in the early hours of the morning (usually between 5 a.m. and 7 a.m.) may be because of the symbolism of the resemblance to the hour and environment in which Jesus was born and because He is "the light that is born for the world", or because this is a convenient time for farmers who began their toil also very early.
