= Luís de Figueiredo e Lemos =

Portuguese Roman Catholic bishop

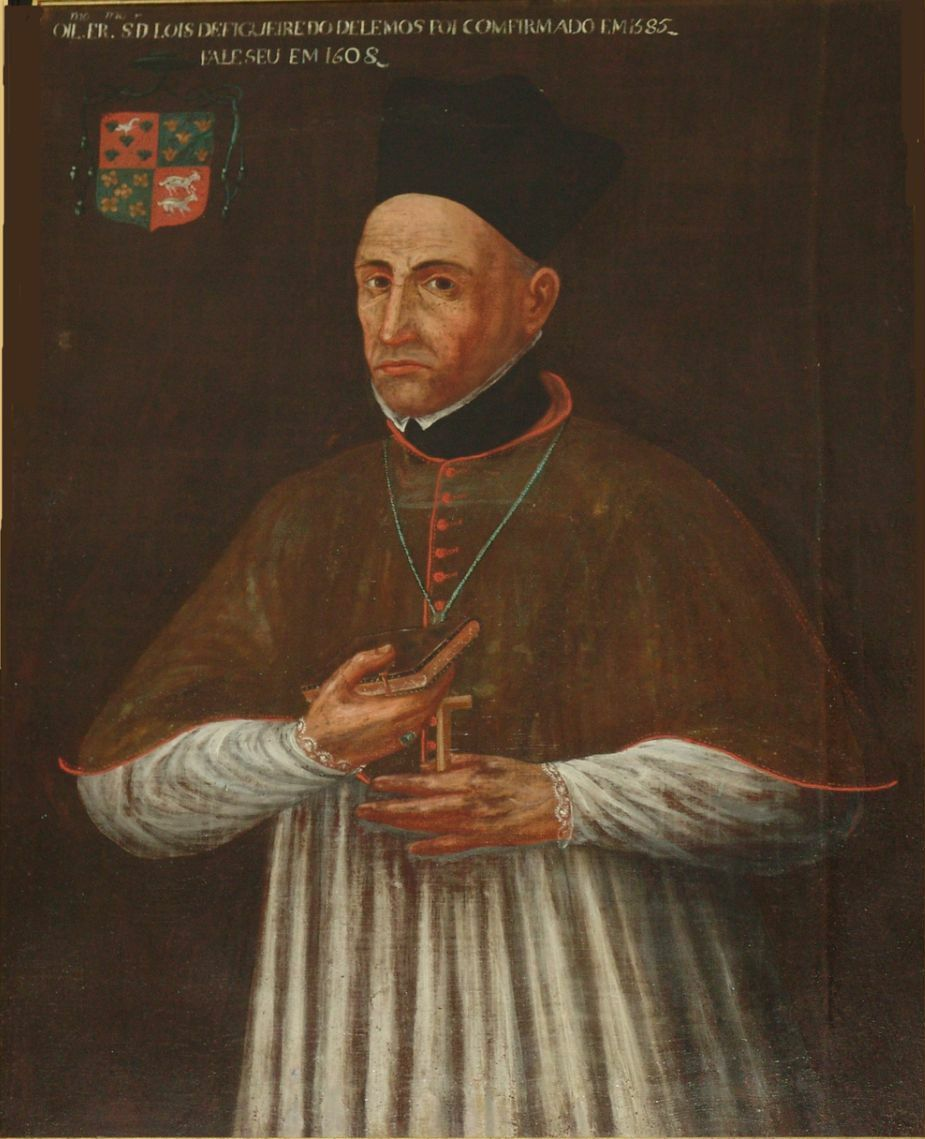
Portrait of Luís de Figueiredo e Lemos

Luís de Figueiredo e Lemos (born 1544 in Porto) was a Portuguese clergyman and bishop for the Roman Catholic Diocese of Funchal. He was ordained in 1586. He was appointed bishop in 1585. He died in 1608.
