= Frei de Távora =

Portuguese clergyman and bishop

Frei de Távora or Fernando de Tavora was a Portuguese clergyman and bishop for the Roman Catholic Diocese of Funchal. He was ordained in 1569. He was resigned in 1573. He died in 1577.
