= Gaspar do Casal =

Portuguese clergyman and bishop

Gaspar do Casal (born 1510 in Santarém, Portugal) was a Portuguese clergyman and bishop for the Roman Catholic Diocese of Funchal. He was ordained in 1551. He was appointed bishop in 1551. He died in 1584.
