= Jorge de Lemos =

Portuguese clergyman and bishop

Jorge de Lemos (born in Lisbon) was a Portuguese clergyman and bishop for the Roman Catholic Diocese of Funchal. He was appointed bishop in 1556. He died in 1585.
