= Caniço (Santa Cruz) =

- Civil parish
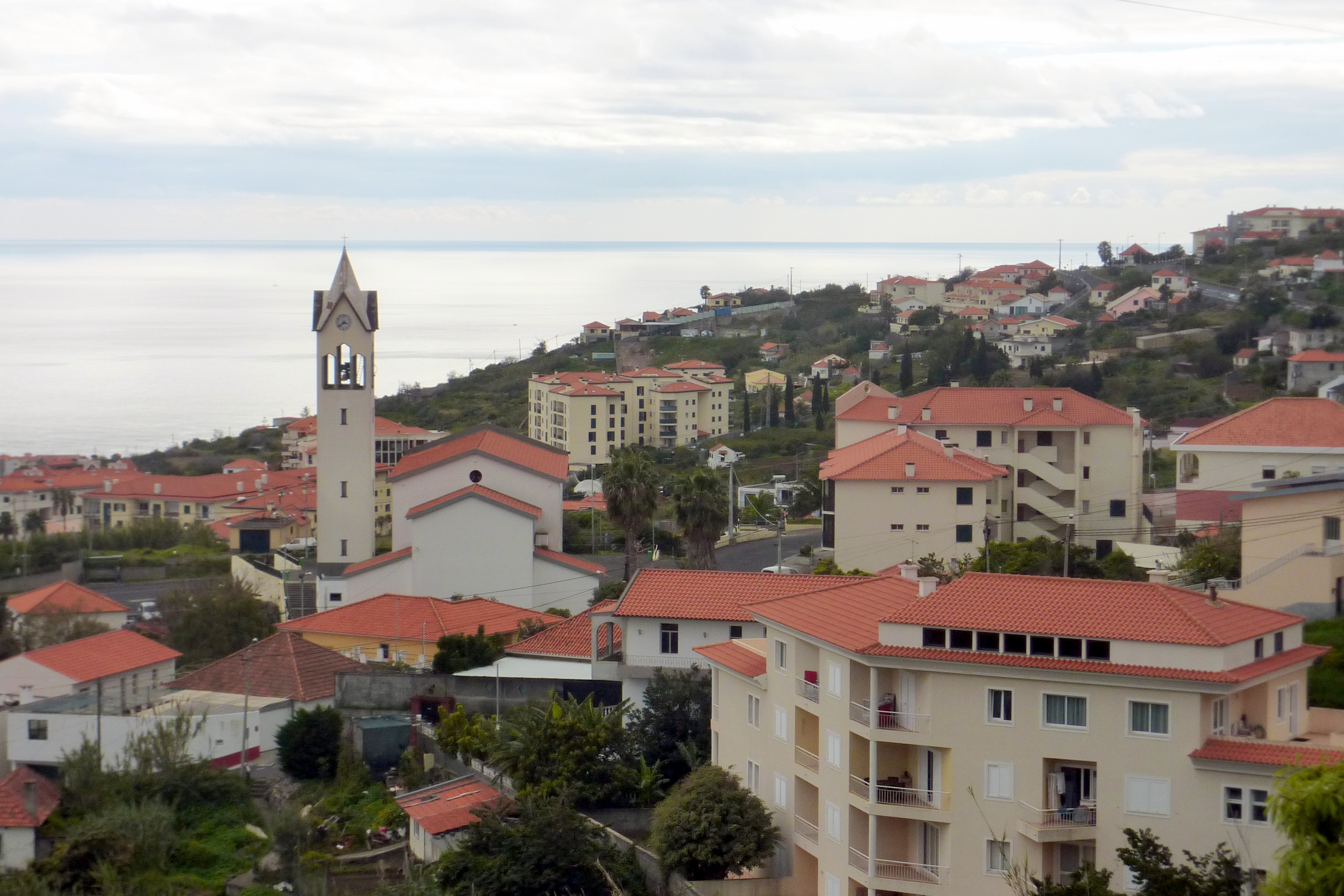

- Coat of arms
- Interactive map of Caniço
- Location in Madeira
- Coordinates: 32.651°N 16.841°W
- Country: Portugal
- Auton. region: Madeira
- Municipality: Santa Cruz

Area
  - Total: 11.99 km^{2} (4.63 sq mi)

Population (2011)
  - Total: 23,368
  - Density: 1,949/km^{2} (5,048/sq mi)
- Time zone: UTC+00:00 (WET)
  - Summer (DST): UTC+01:00 (WEST)

Caniço (Portuguese pronunciation: [kɐˈnisu]) is a parish in the municipality of Santa Cruz in the Madeira Islands. It was elevated to city status in 2005. The population in 2011 was 23,368, in an area of 11.99 km^{2}. Caniço is connected to the urban sprawl of Funchal and is larger than the seat of the municipality. It is located 6 km east of Funchal.

On 17 April 2019, a tour bus crashed on a road near Caniço, killing 29 people.

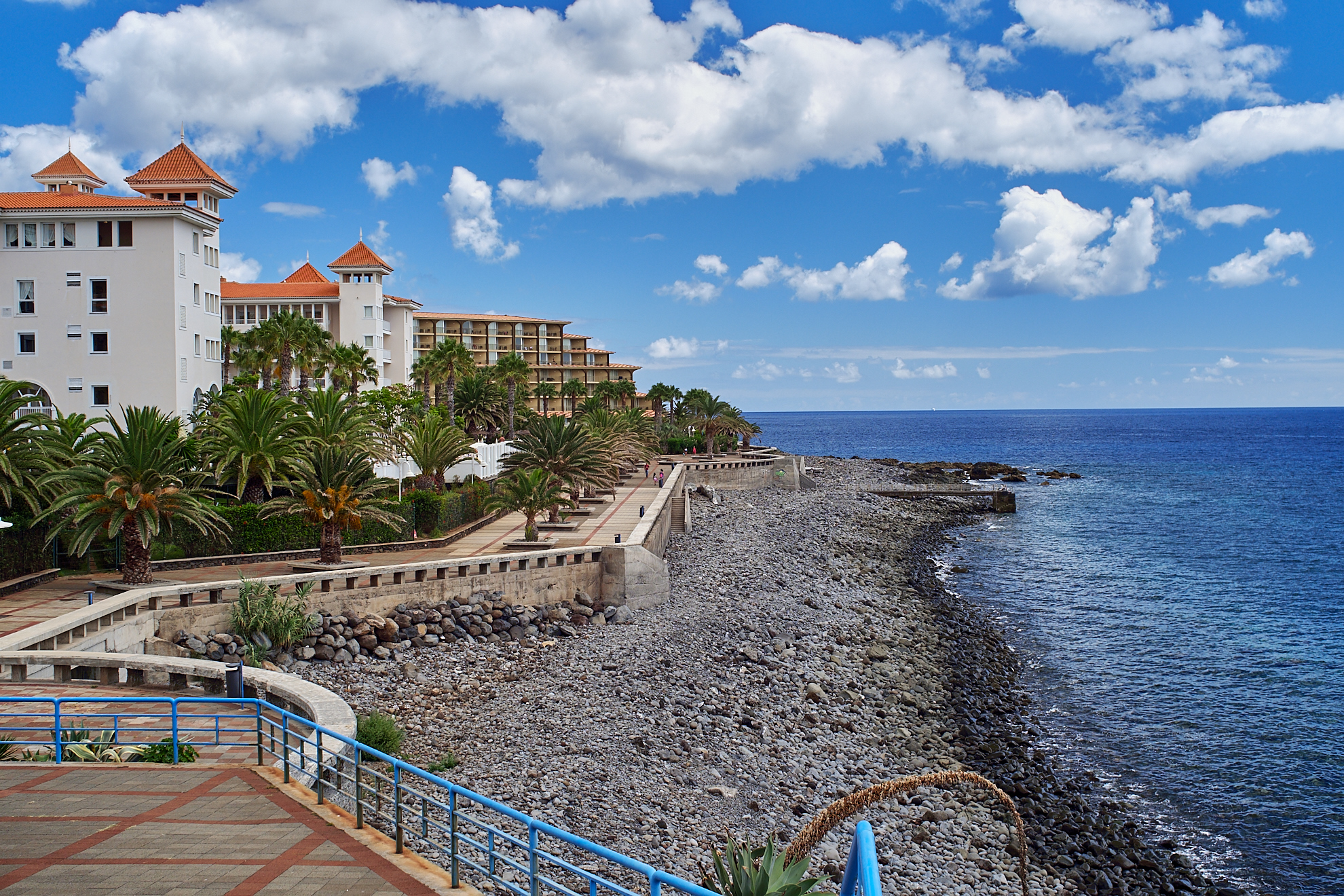
Reis Magos Beach, Caniço.

== See also ==
- The "sacred heart" statue in Caniço is by Pierre Charles Lenoir
