= 2019 Madeira bus crash =

Incident in Portugal

Details
- Date: 17 April 2019; 18:30
- Location: Caniço, Madeira, Portugal
- Incident type: Single-vehicle accident
- Cause: Under investigation

Statistics
- Deaths: 29
- Injured: 27

On 17 April 2019, a tour bus carrying 56 people—mostly tourists from Germany—crashed in Caniço in Madeira, Portugal. At least 29 people were killed—18 women and 11 men—and 27 more were injured, including the Portuguese driver and tourist guide.

== Events ==
The crash took place around 18:30 local time, with the bus veering off a hilly road and tumbling down an embankment, coming to rest atop a house.

The crash overwhelmed nearby hospitals and required 19 ambulances to transport the injured passengers. Portuguese Prime Minister António Costa sent condolences to German chancellor Angela Merkel, while Portuguese President Marcelo Rebelo de Sousa announced plans to visit the site of the crash. German foreign minister Heiko Maas travelled to Madeira on 18 April in response to the incident, accompanied by doctors, psychologists and consular officials. He said work was underway to bring injured victims home and identify the dead.

The Portuguese Government decreed the three days following the tragedy (18, 19, and 20 April 2019) to be national days of mourning.
