= António José Cavaco Carrilho =

Portuguese prelate

His Excellency, The Most Reverend Dom António III GOIH
- Bishop of Funchal
- Church: Catholic Church
- Archdiocese: Patriarchate of Lisbon
- Province: Lisbon
- Diocese: Funchal
- See: Funchal
- Predecessor: Teodoro
- Successor: Nuno I
- Previous posts: Auxiliary Bishop of Porto and Titular Bishop of Tamalluma

Orders
- Ordination: 28 July 1965
- Consecration: 22 February 1999 by Manuel Madureira Dias, Bishop of Faro; Armindo Lopes Coelho, Bishop of Porto; Júlio Tavares Rebimbas, Bishop Emeritus of Porto
- Rank: Bishop

Personal details
- Born: António José Cavaco Carrilho; 5 May 1947 (age 79) Loulé, Algarve
- Denomination: Catholic Church
- Residence: Casa Episcopal do Funchal
- Parents: Alexandre Bento Carrilho; Isabel de Jesus Cavaco
- Education: Catholic University of Portugal
- Motto: Faz-te ao largo (Launch out into the deep)
- Coat of arms

Dom António José Cavaco Carrilho GOIH (Loulé, April 11, 1942) who identifies himself as António Carrilho and is officially António III, is a Portuguese prelate of the Catholic Church who was Bishop of Funchal between 2007 and January 2018.

== Early life and education ==
António Carrilho was born in Loulé, in Algarve, Alexandre Bento Carrilho and de Isabel de Jesus Cavaco.

He joined the Faro Seminary in October 1953, and then moved to Lisbon to pursue philosophical and theological courses at the Olivais Seminary.

In October 1977 he joined the Catholic University in Lisbon, where he graduated with a degree in theology.

== Priesthood ==
On July 28, 1965, he was ordained priest by Bishop Fra Francisco Rendeiro at the Cathedral of Faro. He celebrated his New Mass in the Mother Church of his parish of St. Clement in Loulé.

After graduating from university he began to work at the Portuguese Episcopal Conference, where he held various functions over the years.

== Episcopate ==
On 22 February 1999, he was appointed Titular Bishop of Tamalluma and Auxiliary Bishop Porto by Pope John Paul II. On 8 March 2007 he was appointed Bishop of Funchal, a post he held until his successor was appointed by Pope Francis on January 12, 2019.

=== Portugal's Conference of Catholic Bishops ===
Bishop Carrilho has held several posts within Portugal's Conference of Catholic Bishops over the years:

- Member of the Episcopal Commission of the Apostolate of the Laity for the 1999-2002 triennium and President for 2002/2005
- Member of the Episcopal Commission of Cultural Assets of the Church for the triennium 2002/2005
- President of the Episcopal Commission of the Laity and Family for two three-year periods, 2005-2011, and member since 2011

Currently he is a member of the Conference's Commission for Missions and New Evangelization.

=== Priest Giselo Andrade Case ===
In November 2017, Madeiran newspapers reported that Priest Giselo Andrade, canon of the Catholic parish of Monte in Funchal, then 37 years old, had assumed the paternity of a girl on August 18 of the same year. The girl was born to a former high school colleague of the priest.

At the time of the news reports Father Giselo was a member of the Permanent Secretariat of the Presbyteral Council and the director of the Diocese's newspaper Jornal da Madeira.

Carilho was forced to intervene after he had commented to the press that "Everything is forgiven, as long as there is true repenting and a change in lifestyle" to justify the permanence in office of Priest Giselo and his wish to remain in functions within the parish.

On January 27, at 9 o'clock in the evening, Bishop Carrilho stated, through his personal secretary, Priest Carlos Almada, in a press release, that Priest Giselo was to be removed from office in the parish of Monte and to be substituted by the canon Vítor Gomes. Despite being the removed from the parish, Bishop Carrilho stated in his press release that Father Giselo would to "...continue to exercise the pastoral ministry through some of the activities already entrusted to him in the area of communications [as director of Jornal da Madeira], and others that may be assigned to him".

Styles of António José Cavaco Carrilho
- Reference style: His Excellency; the Most Reverend
- Spoken style: Your Excellency; Dom
- Religious style: Bishop

Bishop Carillho's decision and its timing polarized the public opinion in Madeira, specially in Monte where the vast majority of parishioners wished that Priest Giselo remain as their priest even after he had assumed the paternity of the child. Parishioners criticized and repudiated Bishop Carrilho's decision, calling it an inhumane decision.

=== Sexual Abuse Policies ===
In September 2018, Carrilho decided to remove from office Father Anastácio Alves, who had ecclesiastical functions on the Portuguese Parish of Gentilly, near Paris, after Madeira's Public Prosecution Service announced investigations on an alleged child abuse case. Bishop Carrilho stated that the Diocese of Funchal has zero tolerance policy regarding child abuse cases and is in "full communion with Pope Francis's" views on how to handle the said cases. In light of this case, Bishop Carrilho also stated that he would be conducting an investigation on Father Alves's case and submit all the conclusions to the Congregation for the Doctrine of the Faith, as required by Canon law.

==== Public Support for Pope Francis ====
Following the McCarrick case and Viganò allegations, happening at about the same time as the conclusion of the Grand jury investigation of Catholic Church sexual abuse in Pennsylvania, Bishop Carrilho, together with his peers of the Portuguese Episcopal Conference was co-signer of a public support letter addressed to Pope Francis.

The Portuguese bishops criticized all "attempts to call into question the [Pope's] credibility" and expressed "fraternal support" to the leader of the Catholic Church, stressing that they are in "full communion" with the Pope.

In the same letter, Bishop Carrilho and his peers also took the opportunity to support and condemn the "drama of child abuse by responsible members of the Church," under a commitment to "root out the causes."

== Honours ==
- Grand Officer of the Order of Prince Henry, 2019

== Coat of Arms ==
Coat of arms of the Bishop of Funchal
Adopted 1999 Coronet Bishop's Galero Escutcheon Blue, a bar wavy Argent charge with a Vert fess, between three fish Gules, the superios in courtesy, in chief a Chrismon Or, contained in the ring of the same metal, and in base an eight-pointed star Argent. Supporters A latin cross Or. Motto Faz-te ao largo Symbolism The charges: the wavy band carried with the fish represents the sea and the fishes the People of God. Which articulated with the motto taken from the Gospel according to St. Luke (5: 4); symbolizes also the sea of the Algarve, where the bishop is from, and alludes to the church of his episcopal ordination: S. Peter of the Sea, in Quarteira. The position of the superior fish - in courtesy, that is, facing each other - is the usual one, when in the shield it appears, as is the case, some symbol representing Christ, forcing the animals to turn to this symbol. The golden chrismon represents Christ, occupying the most honorable place of the shield, the chief. It is within a framework that means that the apostolic action of the Bishop is directed to place Jesus Christ at the center of the world. The silver star is par excellence a Marian symbol, alluding to the patrons of the Cathedral of Faro and the Cathedral and the City of Porto, where the prelate began his office as Auxiliary Bishop, and also to Our Lady of Mercy, the Sovereign Mother, Patroness of the City and the Municipality of Loulé, where it is natural. Also the Diocese of Funchal is especially dedicated to the Virgin Mary, having as its Patron, under various invocations, 48 of its 96 parishes, and the Diocese itself, under the title of Our Lady of the Mount.
