= Arrestment =

Arrestment, in Scots law, is the process by which a creditor detains the goods or effects of his debtor in the hands of third parties till the debt due to him shall be paid. It is divided into several kinds:

1. Arrestment in security, used when proceedings are commencing, or in other circumstances where a claim may become, but is not yet, enforceable
2. Arrestment in execution, following on the decree of a court, or on a registered document, under a clause or statutory power of registration, according to the custom of Scotland.
3. Arrestment of a ship, for a maritime claim; if the debtor fears a ship will leave harbour, he can apply for a warrant to dismantle the ship.

By the process of arrestment the property covered is merely retained in place; to realize it for the satisfaction of the creditor's claim a further proceeding called "forthcoming" is necessary. By old practice, funds necessary for survival were not liable to arrestment. By the Wages Arrestment Limitation (Scotland) Act 1870, the wages of all labourers, farm-servants, manufacturers, artificers and work-people are, with some exceptions, not arrestable.
