= Igreja de São João Evangelista =

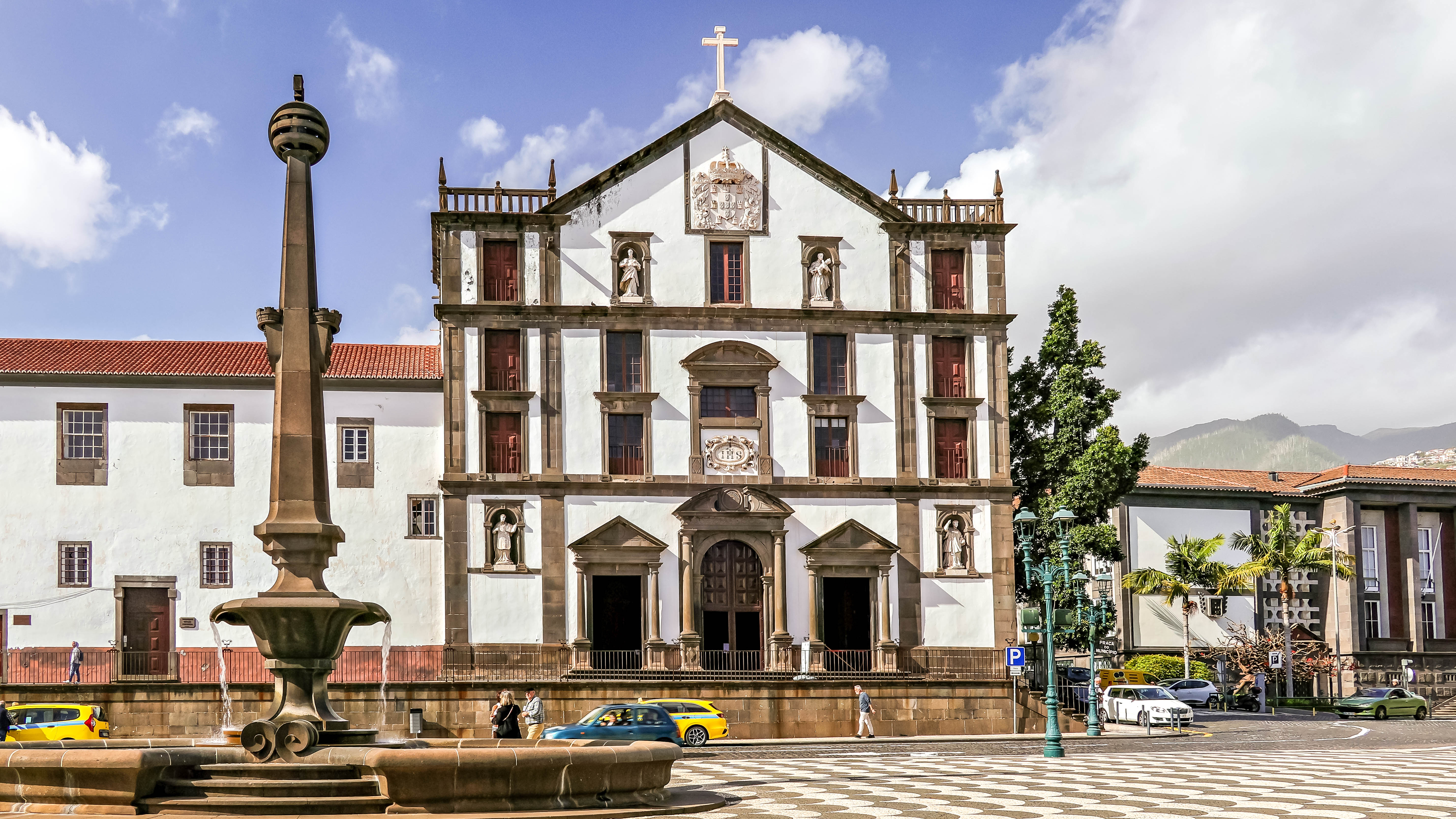
- Igreja de São João Evangelista, Funchal.

- Location within Madeira
- 32°38′59.3″N 16°54′32.6″W
- Location: Funchal, Madeira
- Country: Portugal
- Denomination: Roman Catholic
- Website: www.diocesedofunchal.com

Administration
- Province: Patriarchate of Lisbon
- Archdiocese: Patriarchate of Lisbon
- Diocese: Diocese of Funchal

The Church of Saint John the Evangelist of the College of Funchal (Portuguese: Igreja de São João Evangelista do Colégio do Funchal) is a church located in the historic center of the city and county of Funchal on the island of Madeira in Portugal.

== History ==
Constructed in the 17th century by the Society of Jesus, the church marked the transition from the Mannerist style to the Baroque, marked by great, ostentatious decorations.

It constituted the largest structure built in the city until the 19th century.

In 2008 a large organ was installed in the church, the work of the organ player Dinarte Machado, inaugurated by Ton Koopman.

The church belongs to the old Jesuit College and is presently occupied by the University of Madeira and the Catholic University.

== Characteristics ==
The church has a Latin-cross plan, with a single nave and chancel, profusely decorated with gilded wood, valuable 17th- and 18th-century altarpieces, and blue and white tile panels from the 17th century that line the walls of the sacristy. Noteworthy is the altar of the chapel of the Eleven Thousand Virgins.

== See also ==
- List of Jesuit sites
