= Teodoro de Faria =

Portuguese Roman Catholic prelate (1930–2025)

His Excellency, The Most Reverend Dom Teodoro de Faria GOIH
- Bishop Emeritus of Funchal
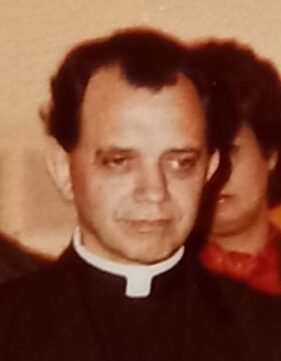
- Teodoro de Faria in 1982
- Church: Catholic Church
- Archdiocese: Patriarchate of Lisbon
- Province: Lisbon
- Diocese: Funchal
- See: Funchal
- Predecessor: Francisco Antunes Santana
- Successor: António José Cavaco Carrilho
- Previous post: Vice-Rector of the Portuguese Pontifical College (1966)

Orders
- Ordination: 22 September 1956
- Consecration: 10 March 1982 by Maximilien, Cardinal von Furstenberg, Aurelio, Cardinal Sabattani and Maurílio Gouveia, Archbishop of Évora
- Rank: Bishop

Personal details
- Born: 24 August 1930 Funchal, Madeira, Portugal
- Died: 23 August 2025 (aged 94) Funchal, Madeira, Portugal

Dom Teodoro de Faria GOIH (24 August 1930 – 23 August 2025) was a Portuguese Roman Catholic prelate, who served as Bishop of Funchal between 1982 and 2007.

== Biography ==
De Faria was born in Funchal on 24 August 1930. He was ordained priest on 22 September 1956. Ten years after his ordination he would be appointed Vice-Rector of the Pontifical Portuguese College in Rome in 1966 and later Rector of the Pontifical College and the Church of Saint Anthony of the Portuguese.

He would later become a member of the Apostolic Union of the Clergy and the Center for Sindonology. He gave conferences, retreats and courses in various parts of the world. He was the representative of Portugal in Rome in the Secretariats for Ecumenism, Emigration, Tourism and Pilgrimages.

He was Secretary of the Cardinal Patriarch of Lisbon, António II, in the conclaves that elected Popes John Paul I and John Paul II.

He would later be consecrated in Rome on 16 May 1982, in the Church of Saint Anthony in Campo Marzio as Bishop of Funchal in 1982, in the early years of Madeira's political autonomy, and effectively taking office on 16 May that year. He took possession of the Diocese on 30 May of the same year.

In 1986 was appointed President of the Portuguese Episcopal Commission for Migration and Tourism, and two years after he was elected member of the Pontifical Commission for Migrants and Itinerant People, having participated in Rome in several Congresses.

In his capacity as Bishop he was a representative of the Portuguese Episcopal Conference at Commission of the Bishops' Conferences of the European Community.

During his term as Bishop of Funchal, de Faria hosted the visit of Pope John Paul II to the islands of Madeira and Porto Santo, which were under his ecclesiastical jurisdiction.

In 2006 he submitted his resignation from office to Pope Benedict XVI, due to having reached his age limit in office.

=== Child abuse policies ===
During his tenure has Bishop of Funchal, de Faria publicly defended, and was accused of pressuring Portuguese judicial authorities, Father Frederico Cunha who ended up being convicted and sentenced to 13 years in prison for child abuse by the Court of Santa Cruz.

At the time, de Faria claimed that the Cunha was being prosecuted based on unfounded grounds.

Cunha, although convicted, would end up escaping on his first probation period, in 1998, by taking a car from the Portuguese mainland, he was serving sentence in a prison in the mainland, to Madrid, and from there to Brazil, where he lived.

de Faria has committed himself to silence on this case since the conviction of Cunha. In September 2020, de Faria still believed in the innocence of Cunha.

=== Bishop Emeritus of Funchal ===
As Emeritus Bishop of Funchal, de Faria has led a low-profile presence in Madeiran society, having publicly appeared solely in major religious and academics events on the island.

Nevertheless, he has criticized his successor, Dom António Carrilho, regarding the need for parish restructuring in the Diocese of Funchal. de Faria considered that in Madeira, "some parishes are only called parishes due to pity", arguing that there are places where the parish priest has two or three parishes, and every year there are one or two baptized, some of which are ceremonies of faithful living abroad, but choose their land to celebrate the sacraments.

Given the above, he considered that the principle established by Bishop Fra' David de Sousa, who was Bishop of Funchal between 1957 and 1965, should be reintroduced in the Diocese, i.e. there should be a parish per, at least two thousand people. Teodoro argued that parish restructuring is vital, specially after the great emigration waves to Venezuela and to South Africa.

On 28 July 2018, he was co-consecrator of José Tolentino Calaça de Mendonça, Head Librarian and Head Archivist of the Holy Roman Church.

=== Death ===
De Faria died on 23 August 2025, one day before his 95th birthday.

== Honours ==
=== National orders ===
- Grand-Officer of the Order of Prince Henry, 6 June 2008

=== Other honours ===
- On the end of April 2017, Funchal's City Hall, led by then Mayor Miguel Albuquerque, decided that to honor Bishop Teodoro by naming a 430m avenue after his name, Avenida Dom Teodoro Faria, in São Martinho.

Catholic Church titles
Preceded by Francisco Antunes Santana	Bishop of Funchal; 1982–2007	Succeeded by António José Cavaco Carrilho
