= Diocese of Funchal =

Latin Catholic diocese in Portugal

Diocese of Funchal Dioecesis Funchalensis Diocese do Funchal

Catholic
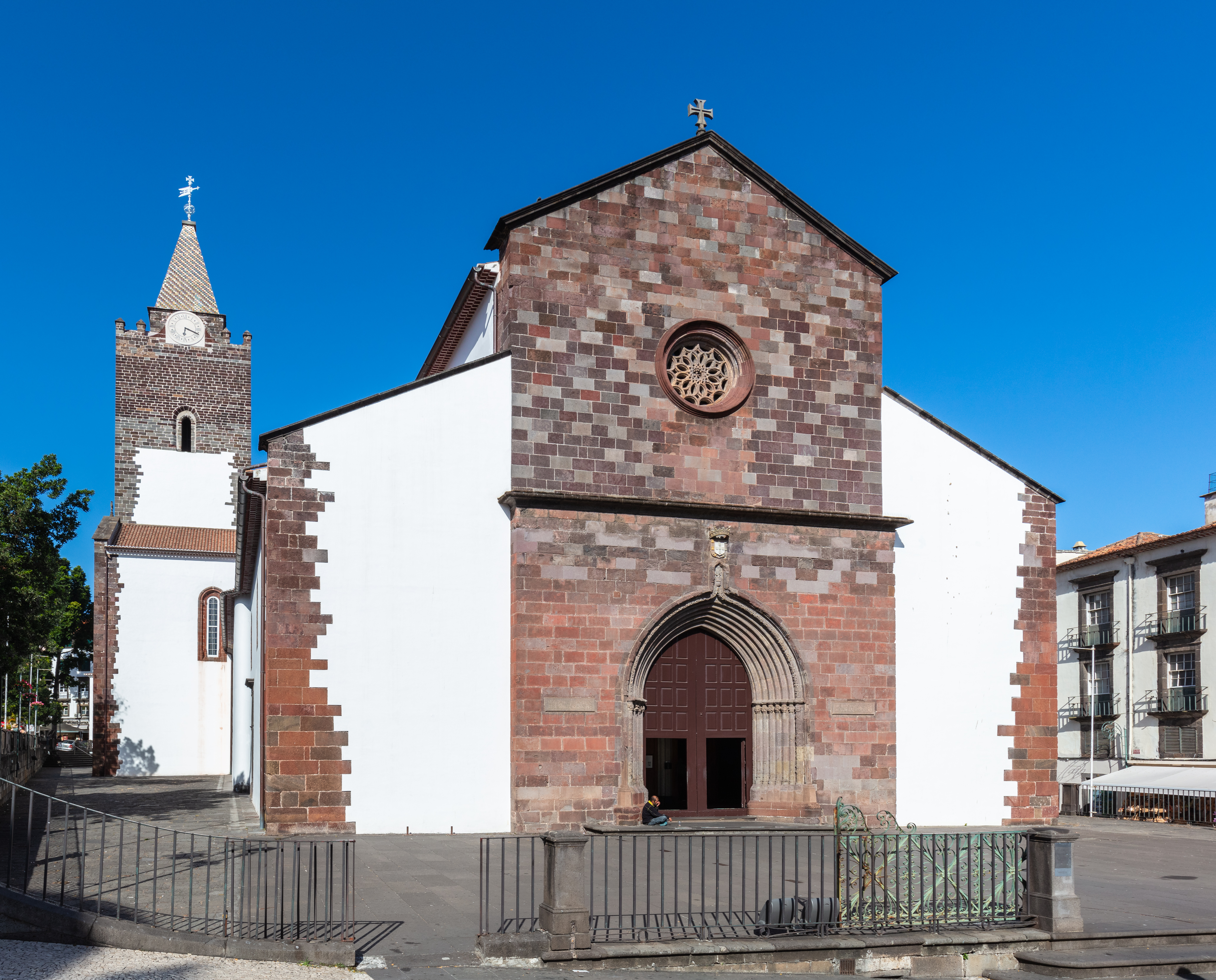
- Cathedral of Our Lady of the Assumption

Location
- Country: Portugal
- Territory: Madeira
- Ecclesiastical province: Lisbon
- Metropolitan: Patriarchate of Lisbon
- Headquarters: Largo Conde Ribeiro Real 49, Funchal
- Coordinates: 32°38′54″N 16°54′30″W

Statistics
- Area: 800 km^{2} (310 sq mi)
- Population: Total; Catholics: (as of 2021); 261,802; 250,300 (95,6%)
- Parishes: 96
- Schools: 18

Information
- Denomination: Catholic
- Sui iuris church: Latin Church
- Rite: Roman Rite
- Established: 12 January 1514 (As Diocese of Funchal); 31 January 1533 (As Archdiocese of Funchal); 3 July 1551 (As Diocese of Funchal)
- Cathedral: Our Lady of the Assumption
- Patron saint: James the Less; Mary
- Secular priests: 73 (Diocesan); 25 (Religious Orders)
- Language: Portuguese

Current leadership
- Pope: Leo XIV
- Bishop of Funchal: Nuno I
- Metropolitan Archbishop: Rui Valério
- Vicar General: José Fiel de Sousa
- Episcopal Vicars: Carlos Duarte Lino Nunes
- Judicial Vicar: Marcos Fernandes Gonçalves
- Bishops emeritus: António III

Map
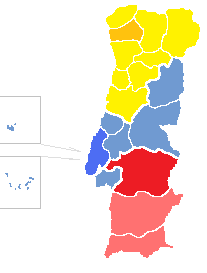

Website
- https://www.diocesedofunchal.com

The Diocese of Funchal (Latin: Dioecesis Funchalensis) is a Latin Church ecclesiastical territory or patriarchal archdiocese of the Catholic Church in Portugal. It was originally created on 12 June 1514 by the papal bull Pro excellenti præeminentia from Pope Leo X, following the elevation of Funchal from a village to the status of city, by King Manuel I of Portugal (Royal Decree of 21 August 1508). The diocese was a suffragan of the Archdiocese of Lisbon.

Before the issuance of the papal bull, between 1433 and 1514 the civil and religious administrations were in charge of the Grand-Master of the Order of Christ. In fact all Portuguese Atlantic territories were under the jurisdiction of Order of Christ, until the situation changed in 1514 with the creation of the Diocese.

Once the diocese was created, the bishop of Funchal had jurisdiction over the entire area occupied by the Portuguese in the Atlantic and Indian Oceans. Thus, the Diocese comprised not only the Islands of Madeira, but all the territories discovered or to be discovered by the Portuguese. Thus, its jurisdiction extended throughout the western and eastern African territory, Brazil and Asia. Given its jurisdiction extent, the diocese's first bishop, D. Diogo Pinheiro used the title of Primate.

Nineteen years later, on 31 January 1533, the diocese was elevated to archiepiscopal rank. For twenty-two years it was, geographically, the largest metropolitan ecclesiastical province in the world, having as suffragan dioceses: Azores, Brazil, Africa and Goa. The first (and only) Archbishop was D. Martinho of Portugal, also held the title of Primate.

Following the Portuguese Empire's economic and social developments, new dioceses were created in 1534, whose areas were detached from the Diocese of Funchal: Goa, Angra, Santiago and São Tome, São Salvador da Bahia. Later, on January 31, 1533, the Diocese of Funchal was elevated to the category of metropolitan and primate. In 1551 Pope Julius III revoked the situation by passing Funchal to the simple suffrage bishopric of the Archdiocese of Lisbon, as it remains today.

The first bishop to visit the diocese was D. Ambrósio Brandão, in 1538, on behalf of the diocesan bishop D. Martinho of Portugal. After the death of D. Martinho de Portugal, the only archbishop of Funchal, the cathedral remained vacant until 1551. One year later, in 1552, Fr. Gaspar do Casal, who did not reside on the island, was appointed, and the most salient fact of his action was his participation in the Council of Trent. His successors, D. Jorge de Lemos, D. Jerónimo Barreto and D. Luís Figueiredo de Lemos, applied the Council and were the true workers of this reform.

The first bishop of Funchal to actually reside, full-time, after his appointment was D. Jorge de Lemos, in 1558.

Throughout its more than five centuries of history the diocese has only been headed by two Madeirans so far: D. Aires de Ornelas e Vasconcelos, who would then become Archbishop of Goa, and D. Teodoro de Faria.

Until the 20th century, the bishops of Funchal used the title of Bishop of Madeira, of Porto Santo, of Desertas and of Arguim. The seat of the Diocese of Funchal is the Cathedral of Our Lady of the Assumption.

On 8 March 2007, Pope Benedict XVI appointed António Carrilho (António III) as Bishop of Funchal, until then Auxiliary Bishop of Porto. Together with Cardinal Fernando Filoni, António III, presided over the celebrations for the 500th anniversary of the foundation of the diocese on 17 May 2014.

The current bishop of Funchal is Nuno I, who took office on February 17, 2019.

== Administrative divisions ==
The diocese is currently organized into seven Archpriestships, which themselves are subdivided into a total of 96 parishes.

Archpriestships	Parishes	Patron
Funchal	Álamos	Saint John the Baptist
Funchal	Bom Sucesso	Our Lady of the Good Event
Funchal	Coração de Jesus	Sacred Heart of Jesus
Funchal	Curral das Freiras	Our Lady of Deliverance
Funchal	Espírito Santo	Holy Ghost
Funchal	Fátima	Our Lady of Fátima
Funchal	Graça	Our Lady of Grace
Funchal	Imaculado Coração de Maria	Immaculate Heart of Mary
Funchal	Livramento	Our Lady of Deliverance
Funchal	Nazaré	Our Lady of Nazareth
Funchal	Nossa Senhora do Monte	Our Lady of Monte
Funchal	Piedade	Our Lady of Sorrows
Funchal	Romeiros	Our Lady of Queen of the World
Funchal	Sagrade Family	Holy Family
Funchal	Santa Luzia	Saint Lucy
Funchal	Santa Maria Maior	Saint James the Less
Funchal	Santo Amaro	Saint Amaro
Funchal	Santo António	Saint Anthony of Lisbon and Padua
Funchal	São Gonçalo	Saint Gundisalvus of Amarante
Funchal	São José	Saint Joseph
Funchal	São Martinho	Saint Martin of Tours
Funchal	São Pedro	Saint Peter
Funchal	São Roque	Saint Roch
Funchal	Sé	Our Lady of Assumption
Funchal	Visitação	Our Lady of Visitation
Funchal	Vitória e Santa Rita	Our Lady of Victory and Saint Rita
Funchal	Igreja do Colégio	Saint John the Evangelist
Porto Santo	Piedade	Our Lady of Sorrows
Porto Santo	Espiríto Santo	Holy Ghost
Câmara de Lobos	Câmara de Lobos	Saint Sebastian
Câmara de Lobos	Carmo	Our Lady of Mount Carmel
Câmara de Lobos	Encarnação	Our Lady of Incarnation
Câmara de Lobos	Estreito de Câmara de Lobos	Our Lady of Grace
Câmara de Lobos	Garachico	Our Lady of the Good Event
Câmara de Lobos	Quinta Grande	Our Lady of Remedies
Câmara de Lobos	Santa Cecília	Saint Cecilia
Câmara de Lobos	São Tiago	Saint James the Less
Santana	Arco de São Jorge	Saint Joseph
Santana	Faial	Our Lady of the Nativity
Santana	Ilha	Our Lady of the Rosary
Santana	Porto da Cruz	Our Lady of Guadalupe
Santana	Santana	Saint Anne
Santana	São Jorge	Saint George
Santana	São Roque do Faial	Saint Roch
Santa Cruz and Machico	Achada	Our Lady of Grace
Santa Cruz and Machico	Água de Pena	Saint Beatrix
Santa Cruz and Machico	Assomada	Our Lady of Sorrows
Santa Cruz and Machico	Bom Caminho	Our Lady of the Good Path
Santa Cruz and Machico	Camacha	Saint Lawrence
Santa Cruz and Machico	Caniçal	Saint Sebastian
Santa Cruz and Machico	Caniço	Holy Ghost and Saint Anthony the Great
Santa Cruz and Machico	Eiras	Our Lady of Peace
Santa Cruz and Machico	Gaula	Our Lady of Light
Santa Cruz and Machico	João Ferino	Our Lady of Health
Santa Cruz and Machico	Lombada	Our Lady of Fátima
Santa Cruz and Machico	Machico	Immaculate Conception
Santa Cruz and Machico	Piquinho	Saint Joseph
Santa Cruz and Machico	Preces	Our Lady of Prayers
Santa Cruz and Machico	Ribeira Seca	Our Lady of Amparo
Santa Cruz and Machico	Rochão	Our Lady of Mount Carmel
Santa Cruz and Machico	Santa Cruz	Saint Salvador
Santa Cruz and Machico	Santo da Serra	Saint Anthony of Lisbon and Padua
Ribeira Brava	Campanário	Saint Blaise
Ribeira Brava	Canhas	Our Lady of Piety
Ribeira Brava	Carvalhal	Our Lady of Fátima
Ribeira Brava	Conceição	Immaculate Conception
Ribeira Brava	Cristo Rei	Christ the King
Ribeira Brava	Madalena do Mar	Mary Magdalene
Ribeira Brava	Ponta do Sol	Our Lady of Light
Ribeira Brava	Ribeira Brava	Saint Benedict
Ribeira Brava	São João	Saint Jonh the Baptist
Ribeira Brava	São Paulo	Saint Paul
Ribeira Brava	Serra de Água	Our Lady of Help
Ribeira Brava	Tabua	Holy Trinity
Calheta	Amparo	Our Lady of Amparo
Calheta	Arco da Calheta	Saint Blaise
Calheta	Atouguia	Saint Jonh the Baptist
Calheta	Calheta	Holy Ghost
Calheta	Estreito da Calheta	Our Lady of Grace
Calheta	Fajã da Ovelha	Saint Jonh the Baptist
Calheta	Jardim do Mar	Our Lady of the Rosary
Calheta	Loreto	Our Lady of Loreto
Calheta	Paul do Mar	Saint Amaro
Calheta	Ponta do Pargo	Saint Peter
Calheta	Prazeres	Our Lady of Snow
Calheta	Raposeira	Saint Anthony of Lisbon and Padua
Calheta	São Francisco Xavier	Saint Francis Xavier
São Vicente and Porto Moniz	Achadas da Cruz	Our Lady of Livramento
São Vicente and Porto Moniz	Boaventura	Saint Quiteria
São Vicente and Porto Moniz	Fajã do Penedo	Immaculate Heart of Mary
São Vicente and Porto Moniz	Feiteiras	Our Lady of Peace
São Vicente and Porto Moniz	Lameiros	Our Lady of Health
São Vicente and Porto Moniz	Ponta Delgada	Our Lord Good Jesus
São Vicente and Porto Moniz	Porto Moniz	Immaculate Conception
São Vicente and Porto Moniz	Ribeira da Janela	Our Lady of Incarnation
São Vicente and Porto Moniz	Rosário	Our Lady of the Rosary
São Vicente and Porto Moniz	Santa	Mary Magdalene
São Vicente and Porto Moniz	São Vicente	Saint Vincent
São Vicente and Porto Moniz	Seixal	Saint Anthony the Great

== Choice of Patron Saint ==
St. James the Less was chosen as Patron Saint of the Diocese time when Funchal faced various periods of plague in the 16th century.

In 1521, a severe plague spread throughout the city. Although local authorities, at the time, had sought to isolate the sick in order to control the plague outbreak, the efforts made seemed to be vain.

Gaspar Frutuoso, in his book Saudades da Terra accounts that "the city's Chapter and Senate resolved to choose by random ballot a patron saint among the Apostles... After having prayed before God, a boy named John picked a note, where the name of James Minor was written, and they soon rejoiced all over the city."

Two years later, the civil authorities and the Dean of the Chapter met again in Funchal's Cathedral and confirmed the choice made of St. James Minor as their patron, with the commitment to celebrate him every year in his chapel with mass and procession in the Cathedral first day of May.

== Schools ==
The diocese directly runs one higher education institution, one theological school and several other schools on the Autonomous Region of Madeira.

=== Municipality of Funchal ===
==== Higher Education ====
- Superior School for Nursing José de Cluny

==== Religious Education ====
- Theological School of Funchal

==== Schools and High Schools ====
- Arendrup School
- Complementary School of Til (APEL)
- Maria Eugénia de Canavial School
- Missionary School of the Sacred Heart of Jesus
- Presentation of Mary School
- Prince Henry, The Navigator School
- Princess Maria-Amélia School
- Saint John of the Brook School
- Saint Thérèse of the Child Jesus and the Holy Face School
- Salesian School

=== Other Municipalities ===
Schools and High Schools

- Saint Francis of Sales School - Calheta
- Saint Ana School - Machico
- Holy Family School - Santana
- Our Lady of the Conception School - Porto Santo Island
- Saint Constable School - Santa Cruz
- Saint Francis of Sales School - Santa Cruz

== Culture ==
=== Sacred Art Museum of Funchal ===
The Sacred Art Museum of Funchal, run by the diocese is housed in the former Episcopal Palace, founded by D. Luís Figueiredo de Lemos in 1594. The building was designed by Jerónimo Jorge, Master of Royal Works, who worked in the conception and design of defenses of the city of Funchal. From the primitive building, a section still survives, on the current square of the Municipality and Rua do Bispo. Mannerist sobriety is clearly visible in the northern arch or in the Chapel of Saint Louis of Toulosa, which has an inscription on the façade with the name of its founder, D. Luís de Figueiredo Lemos and dated 1600. D. António Teles da Silva, Bishop of Funchal, carried out new improvement works, between 1675-1682.

With the visit of the Ajuda Palace's Curator Manuel Cayola Zagallo, the diocese became more and more aware of the importance of the Flemish Art collection it owned and that was spread throughout the churches and chapels of its territory. With the unequivocal support from the diocese and the public entities of the time, the identified works were sent to be restore in Lisbon.

After important conservation and restoration work by Fernando Mardel, the paintings were exhibited in Lisbon at the National Museum of Ancient Art in 1949. They would later integrate the Funchal Museum of Sacred Art, inaugurated in 1955. To this set were added other works, especially of Goldsmithing, Ecclesiastic Garments and Sculpture, mostly from Portuguese workshops, which were, in many cases out of worship and in poor condition, in many churches of the diocese, and which became part of the Museum's collections. The Museum's collection include works attributed to painter such as Gerard David, Dieric Bouts, Joos Van Cleve, Jan Provoost and Pieter de Coeck Van Aelst.

=== Madeira Organ Festival ===
Together with the Regional Government of Madeira the diocese promotes, by allowing its churches to act as concert venues, for the island's Organ Festival. This festival is usually organized in a set of twelve concerts, headlined by nationally and internationally renowned Master Organ players.

=== Media ===
The diocese of Funchal runs a radio station (PEF – Posto Emissor de Rádio Difusão do Funchal), that broadcasts the news from Rádio Renascença, and an online newspaper (Jornal da Madeira).

== List of Bishops of Funchal ==
=== Bishops of Funchal ===
1. D. Diego Pinheiro Lobo (1514–1526)

=== Archbishop of Funchal ===
2. D. Martinho de Portugal (1533–1547)

=== Bishops of Funchal ===
3. D. Frei Gaspar (I) do Casal (1551–1556)
4. D. Frei Jorge de Lemos (1556–1569)
5. D. Frei de Távora (1569–1573)
6. D. Jerónimo (I) Barreto (1573–1585), appointed Bishop of Faro {Algarve}
7. D. Luís (I) de Figueiredo e Lemos (1585–1608)
8. D. Frei Lourenço de Távora (1610–1617), appointed Bishop of Elvas
9. D. Jerónimo (II) Fernando (1619–1650)
10. D. Frei Gabriel de Almeida (1670–1674)
11. D. Frei António (I) Teles da Silva (1674–1682)
12. D. Estêvão Brioso de Figueiredo (1683–1689)
13. D. Frei José (I) de Santa Maria (1690–1696), appointed Bishop of Porto
14. D. José (I) de Sousa Castelo Branco (1698–1725)
15. D. Frei Manuel (I) Coutinho (1725–1741), appointed Bishop of Lamego
16. D. Frei João (I) do Nascimento (1741–1753)
17. D. Gaspar (II) Afonso da Costa Brandão (1756–1784)
18. D. José (III) da Costa Torres (1784–1796), appointed Bishop of Elvas
19. D. Luís (II) Rodrigues Vilares (1796–1811)
20. D. João (II) Joaquim Bernardino de Brito (1817–1819)
21. D. Francisco (I) José Rodrigues de Andrade (1821–1838)
22. D. José (IV) Xavier de Cerveira e Sousa (1844–1849), appointed Bishop of Beija
23. D. Manuel (II) Martins Manso (1849–1858), appointed Bishop of Guarda
24. D. Patrício Xavier de Moura (1859–1872)
25. D. Aires de Ornelas e Vasconcelos (1872–1874), appointed Archbishop of Goa, India
26. D. Manuel (III) Agostinho Barreto (1876–1911)
27. D. António (II) Manuel Pereira Ribeiro (1914–1957)
28. D. Frei David de Sousa, OFM (1957–1965), appointed Archbishop of Évora
29. D. João (III) António da Silva Saraiva (1965–1972), appointed Bishop of Coimbra
30. D. Francisco (II) Antunes Santana (1974–1982)
31. D. Teodoro de Faria (1982–2007)
32. D. António (III) José Cavaco Carrilho (2007–2019)
33. D. Nuno Brás da Silva Martins (2019–present)

== Other affiliated bishops ==
=== Coadjutor bishop ===
- Aires de Ornelas de Vasconcelos (1871-1872)

=== Auxiliary bishop ===
- Manuel de Jesus Pereira (1948-1953), appointed Auxiliary Bishop of Coimbra

=== Other priests of this diocese who became Cardinals ===
- António Mendes Bello, appointed Archbishop (personal title), Auxiliary of Lisbon in 1884; future Cardinal
- Teodosio Clemente de Gouveia, appointed Prelate of Mozambique in 1936; future Cardinal
- José Tolentino de Mendonça, appointed Archbishop in 2018 (Cardinal in 2019)

== Coat of Arms ==
On March 23, 2019, the Diocese announced through its Facebook page and on a historical note on its website its coat of arms. The arms were designed by Miguel Pinto-Correia following the economist's open letter to the Bishop published in the regional newspaper, suggesting that the Diocese should adopt a coat of arms on 600th anniversary of the discovery of Madeira.

Coat of arms of Diocese of Funchal

Adopted
2019
Coronet
Bishop's Mitre
Escutcheon
Tierced in Mantle, Gules, Azure and Or; in Dexter an open Book Or with the letters Alpha and Omega Gules inscribed on each side, in Sinister an 8 Pointed-Star Argent, in base a Cross of the Order of Christ proper over Waves of Argent and Azure.
Supporters
A Croizer and Ceremonial Cross Or
Motto
Diocese do Funchal
Symbolism
The book represents the diocese's patron saint, St. James the Less. The red his martyrdom, the life made gift. The 8-pointed star represents Our Lady of the Monte and the blue colour symbolizes Our Lady, as Mother of God. The Cross of Christ represents the centrality of Christ and at the same time, it recalls the boat of Peter (Church) that navigates and goes in the dynamism of mission, of evangelization. The yellow is a tribute to the Autonomous Region of Madeira and the waves remind its emigrants spread all over the world. The waves also represent the archipelago.
