= Cathedral of Funchal =

Cathedral of Our Lady of the Assumption
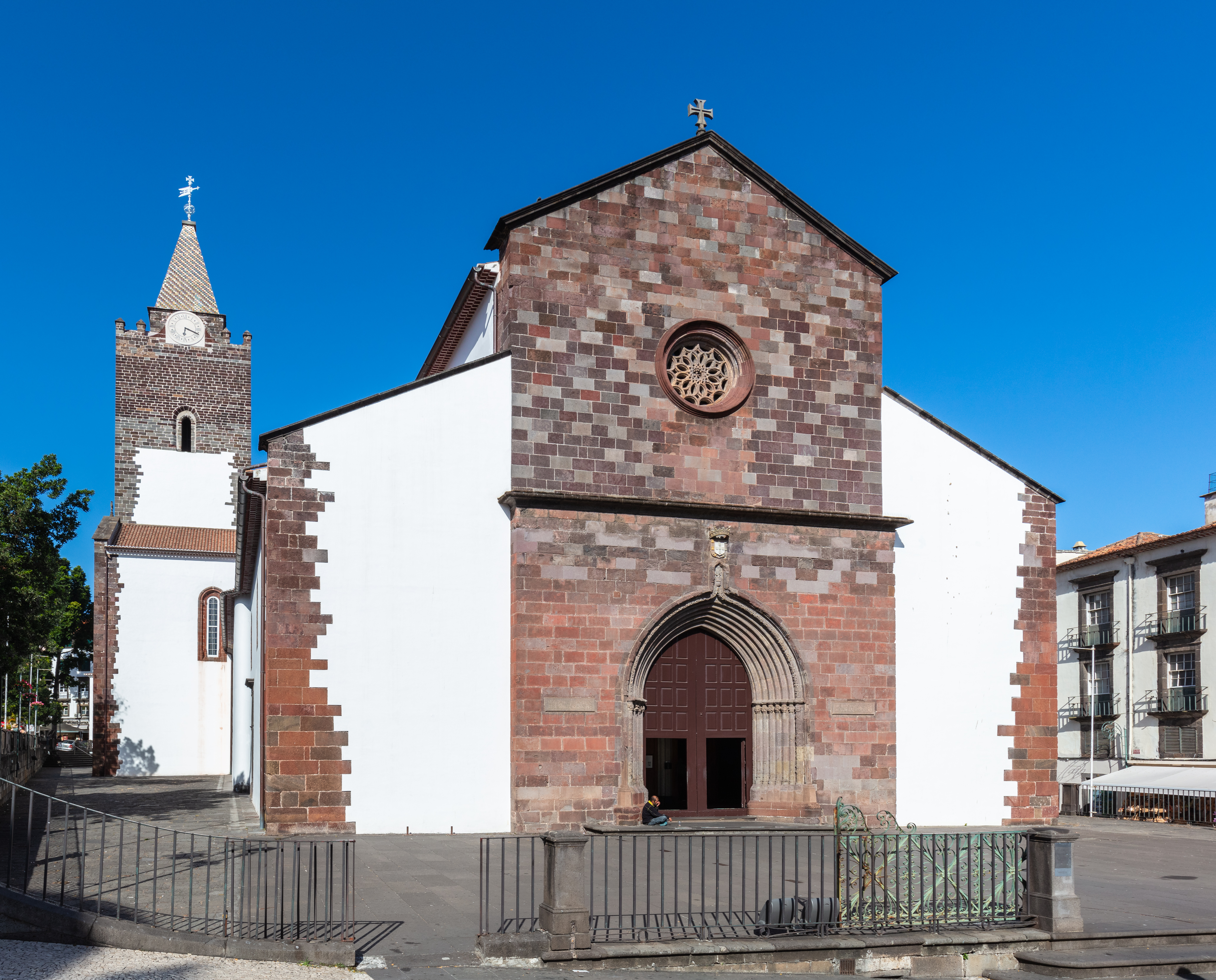
- Facade of the Cathedral

- Location within Madeira
- 32.648333°N 16.908333°W
- Location: Madeira, Funchal
- Country: Portugal
- Denomination: Roman Catholic
- Website: https://www.catedraldofunchal.com/

History
- Dedicated: 1514
- Consecrated: 1517

Architecture
- Completed: 1514

Administration
- Province: Patriarchate of Lisbon
- Archdiocese: Patriarchate of Lisbon
- Diocese: Diocese of Funchal

Clergy
- Archbishop: Dom Manuel Clemente
- Bishop: D. Nuno Brás da Silva Martins

The Cathedral of Our Lady of the Assumption (Portuguese: Sé Catedral de Nossa Senhora da Assunção) is a Catholic cathedral in Sé, Funchal, Madeira, Portugal, serving as the mother church of the Diocese of Funchal, which encompasses all of the Autonomous Region of Madeira. Completed in 1514, it is one of the few structures that survives virtually intact since the early period of colonization of Madeira. The patron of the cathedral is Our Lady of the Assumption (Portuguese: Nossa Senhora da Assunção).

== History ==
The construction of a new church in Funchal was a response to the town's significant population and economic growth in the mid-15th century. The project was initiated in 1486 under the administration of Duke of Viseu and of Beja, the future King Manuel I of Portugal. The chosen site, known as "Chão do Duque," had previously been used for sugarcane cultivation experiments. Plans included the construction of a "great church," a municipal chamber, and a plaza. However, political instability, including disputes over the division of overseas territories between Portugal and Spain, delayed the project. Financial challenges also played a role, as the construction required significant resources from the local population.

Initial debates centered around whether to expand existing churches or build a completely new structure. By 1488, local officials reached a consensus to proceed with a new church at a lower site, referred to as the “sé,” signaling early plans to establish a diocese. These ambitions aligned with correspondence from the 1470s, when attempts by the Bishop of Tangier to include Madeira in his diocese were blocked by the Portuguese Crown, emphasizing plans for a future bishopric tied to the Order of Christ.

Significant progress began only after Manuel ascended to the throne in 1495. His reign brought renewed focus on Funchal's development, including administrative reforms on Madeira and efforts to integrate the island into Portugal’s broader imperial strategy. By 1508, the church walls were complete, and Funchal was elevated to city status. That same year, the Bishop of Tangier, D. João Lobo, blessed the church, further marking its importance.

The church was formally elevated to cathedral status on June 12, 1514, by a papal bull issued by Pope Leo X, officially establishing the Diocese of Funchal. This diocese would play a pivotal role as the "Diocese of the Discoveries," reflecting Madeira’s strategic significance in Portugal’s maritime expansion.

The cathedral’s construction was a collaborative effort involving royal oversight, local contributions, and skilled craftsmen. Master builder João Gonçalves initially led the project, later replaced by Pêro Anes (or Gil Enes), a royal carpenter, who introduced advanced methods seen on the mainland. The financing model included contributions from the Crown via customs revenues and local funding through individual donations and confraternities. In 1501, the King allocated revenue from newly created towns on the island, such as Ponta do Sol and Calheta, to fund the church’s construction.

The cathedral was structurally complete in 1514. Prior to completion, however, by 1508, when Funchal was elevated to the status of a city, the cathedral was already being used for the celebration of Mass.

By 1517, the main altar was consecrated, and the church’s interior was nearly complete, featuring intricate woodwork and silver items funded by island revenues rather than direct royal gifts. The cathedral’s design reflects Gothic and Manueline architectural styles, symbolizing Madeira’s religious and economic prominence during Portugal’s Age of Discoveries.

== Design and artwork ==
The cathedral is designed in a Gothic style and has three naves. The building was constructed using thousands of blocks of volcanic rocks carried from the cliffs at Cabo Girão, namely trachybasalt, trachyandesite, trachyte, tephrite and ashes, lapilli and breccia tuff. The facades are predominantly plastered and painted white, with stonework corners.

The roof of the cathedral features a Mudéjar-inspired design and is of cedar wood. The wooden choir stalls depict prophets, saints and apostles in 16th-century garb. In the decorative details of the seats and armrests, aspects of Madeira's life can also be seen, such as cherubs carrying a bunch of bananas or a wineskin.

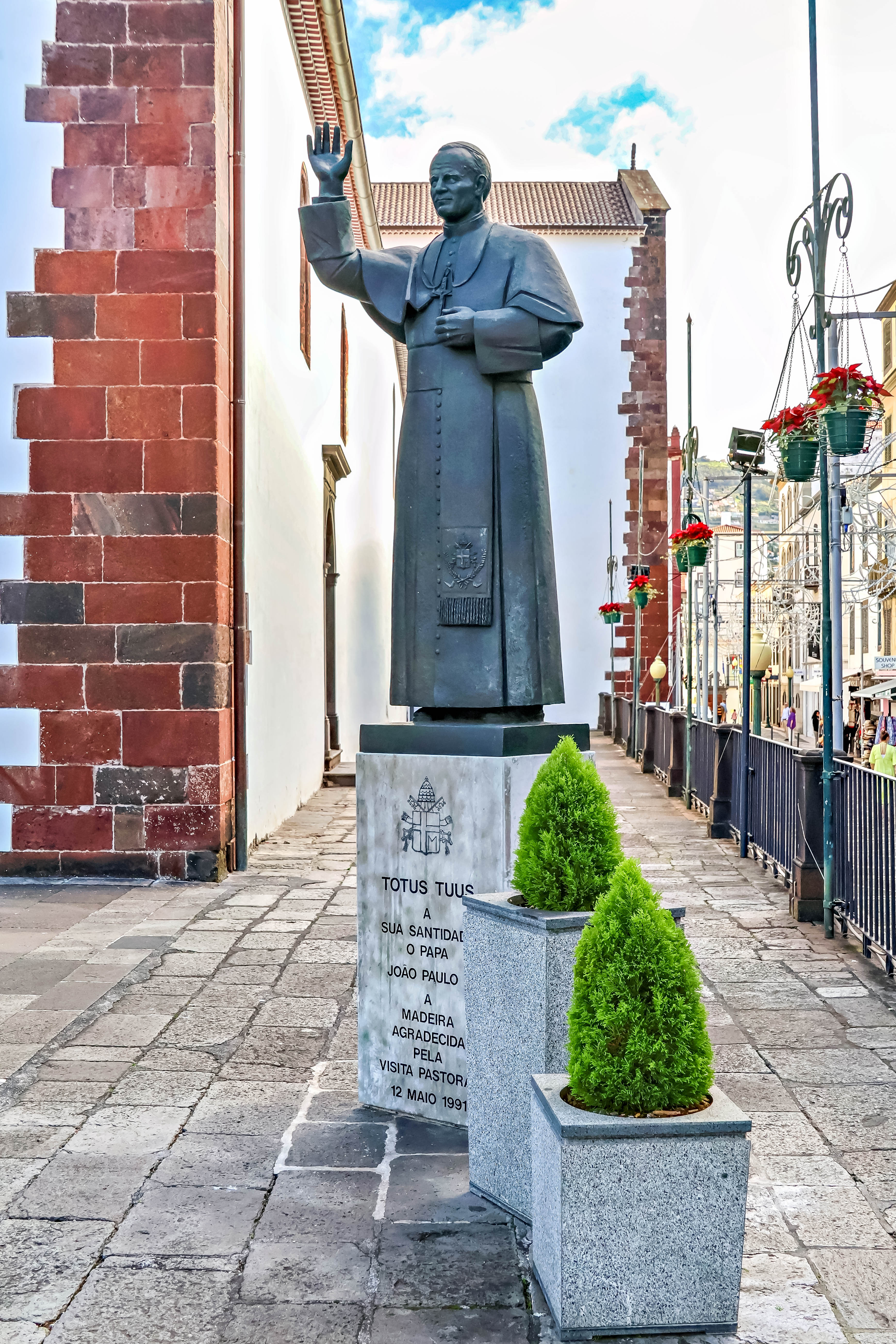
Statue of Pope John Paul II

The opening to the chancel is defined by a triumphal arch of handmade artwork in the form of boards and chairs that are divided into two rows, the first reserved for the capitulars and the lower one for the chaplains. The backrests are decorated with images of the Apostles and Prophets, without neglecting the arms of the chairs, which are crafted to the smallest detail with influences from the Middle Ages.

The cathedral contains a silver processional cross donated by King Manuel I of Portugal, considered one of the masterpieces of Manueline liturgical silverwork.

The Cathedral of Funchal, has been classified as a National Monument since 1910.

As Pope John Paul II visited Madeira in 1991, a statue of Pope was built to remember the event. It is located outside the cathedral, which was moved to its current position after formerly being installed in the urban area of Funchal adjacent to the waterfront.

== Coat of Arms ==
Coat of arms of Cathedral of Funchal

Adopted
2022
Coronet
Bishop's Mitre
Escutcheon
Party per fess: the first Azure with an eight pointed star Argent; the second Argent with a Cross of Christ.
Supporters
A Croizer
Motto
Igreja da Sé - À Vossa Proteção - Catedral do Funchal
