= List of Portuguese composers =

This is a chronological list of notable classical Portuguese composers.

== Middle Ages ==
- King Dinis I (1261–1325), King of Portugal, composer and troubadour. He composed more than 200 cantigas.

== Renaissance ==
- Pedro de Escobar (c. 1465 – after 1535), composer and flutist
- Cosme Delgado (c. 1530–1596), composer of polyphony, kapellmeister in Évora and pedagogue
- Vicente Lusitano (d. after 1561), composer and music theorist
- Bartolomeo Trosylho (1500–1567), composer and kapellmeister in the Lisbon Cathedral
- Damião de Góis (1502–1574), humanist philosopher, composer, student of Erasmus, secretary at a trading post in Antwerp
- António Carreira (1520–1597), composer and organist
- Diogo Dias Melgás (1538–1600), composer of polyphony
- Pedro de Cristo (1545–1618), composer of polyphony
- Manuel Mendes (1547–1605), composer and maestro
- Heliodoro de Paiva (fl. 1552), composer, philosopher and theologian
- Manuel Rodrigues Coelho (1555–1635), composer and organist of the late Renaissance and early Baroque
- Duarte Lobo (1565–1646), composer, choirmaster and musical director
- Manuel Cardoso (1566–1650), composer and organist
- Gaspar Fernandes (1566–1629), composer and organist
- Estêvão de Brito (1570–1641), composer of polyphony of the late Renaissance and early Baroque
- Filipe de Magalhães (1571–1652), composer of sacred polyphony and teacher of Estêvão Lopes Morago, Estêvão de Brito and Manuel Correia
- Estêvão Lopes Morago (c. 1575-1630), Spanish-born composer of sacred polyphony who lived and worked most of his life in Portugal
- Manuel Machado (1590–1646), composer and harpist

== Baroque ==
- Manuel Correia (1600–1653), composer and kapellmeister at the La Seo Cathedral
- King John IV (1603–1656), King of Portugal and early musicologist, with an essay on Giovanni Pierluigi da Palestrina
- João Lourenço Rebelo (1610–1661), composer close to John IV
- Filipe da Madre de Deus (1633–1688), composer and kapellmeister of the royal music chamber
- King Peter II (1648–1706), King of Portugal and composer (only ten organ pieces)
- João Rodrigues Esteves (1700–1751), composer of religious music
- Carlos Seixas (1704–1742), composer and organist
- António Teixeira (1707 – after 1769), composer and chief of the choir of Lisbon Cathedral
- Frei Jacinto do Sacramento (1712–1780?), harpsichordist, organist and composer in Lisbon
- Alberto Joseph Gomes da Silva (v.1713–1795), composer and organist
- Francisco António de Almeida (before 1722 – c.1755), composer and organist
- João de Sousa Carvalho (1745–1798), composer and harpsichordist
- José Joaquim dos Santos (? 1747–1801), graduate of Royal Patriarchal Music Seminary, teacher, composer, singer, organist and conductor (famous for his religious music: Stabat Mater for three voices, 2 sopranos, bass, with 2 violins and violoncello and the 5 Misereres).

== Classical period ==
- Pedro António Avondano (1714–1782), composer and organist (the first Portuguese composer of the Classical period)
- João Pedro de Almeida Mota (1744–1817), Portuguese composer, worked in Spain for many years, where he died. His works are scattered by these two countries.
- Antonio Abreu (c. 1750–c. 1820), Portuguese guitarist and composer
- João José Baldi (1770–1816), composer (famous for his operas) and pianist
- João Domingos Bomtempo (1775–1842), pianist, composer and pedagogue
- Marcos Portugal (1762–1830), composer (famous for his operas) and maestro at Teatro S. Carlos in Lisbon
- Peter IV of Portugal (1798–1836), King of Portugal and Emperor of Brazil who was also a composer (pupil of Marcos Portugal and Nunes Garcia, as well as Sigismund Von Neucomm, a pupil of Haydn).

== Romanticism – early 20th century ==
- Manuel Inocêncio Liberato dos Santos (1805–1887), composer and pianist
- Francisco de Sá Noronha (1820–1881), composer and violinist
- José Augusto Ferreira Veiga, Viscount of Arneiro, (1838–1903) composer and ballet choreographer
- Alfredo Keil (1850–1907), composer of operas and author of the music of the Portuguese national anthem
- José Vianna da Motta (1868–1948), pianist, teacher and composer
- Luís de Freitas Branco (1890–1955), composer and academic
- António Fragoso (1897–1918), pianist and composer
- Eurico Thomaz de Lima (1908–1989), composer, pianist and pedagogue

== Contemporary ==
- Álvaro Salazar (1938–), composer, songwriter and conductor
- António Chagas Rosa (1960–), contemporary composer
- António Pinho Vargas (1951–), jazz and contemporary music pianist and composer
- António Victorino de Almeida (1940–), contemporary music composer
- Bruno Bizarro (1979–), film composer, composer, songwriter
- Carlos Caires (1968–), contemporary music composer, researcher in computer music and teacher
- Constança Capdeville (1937–1992), contemporary music composer and teacher
- Emmanuel Nunes (1941–2012), contemporary music composer
- Eurico Carrapatoso (1962–), composer of mostly orchestral, chamber, choral, and vocal works
- Fernando Corrêa de Oliveira (1921–2004), composer
- Fernando Lopes Graça (1906–1994), composer and musicologist
- Isabel Soveral (1961–), contemporary composer
- Jaime Reis (1983–), contemporary composer
- Joly Braga Santos (1924–1988), contemporary composer and conductor
- Jorge Peixinho (1940–1995), contemporary music composer and teacher
- Luís Tinoco (1969–), contemporary music composer
- Pedro Macedo Camacho (1979–), concert music composer, videogame and film composer
- Rodrigo Leão (1964–), contemporary composer, instrumental music composer, film composer
