= Old Cathedral of Plasencia =

Romanesque/Gothic cathedral in Plasencia, Spain

- Catedral vieja de Plasencia
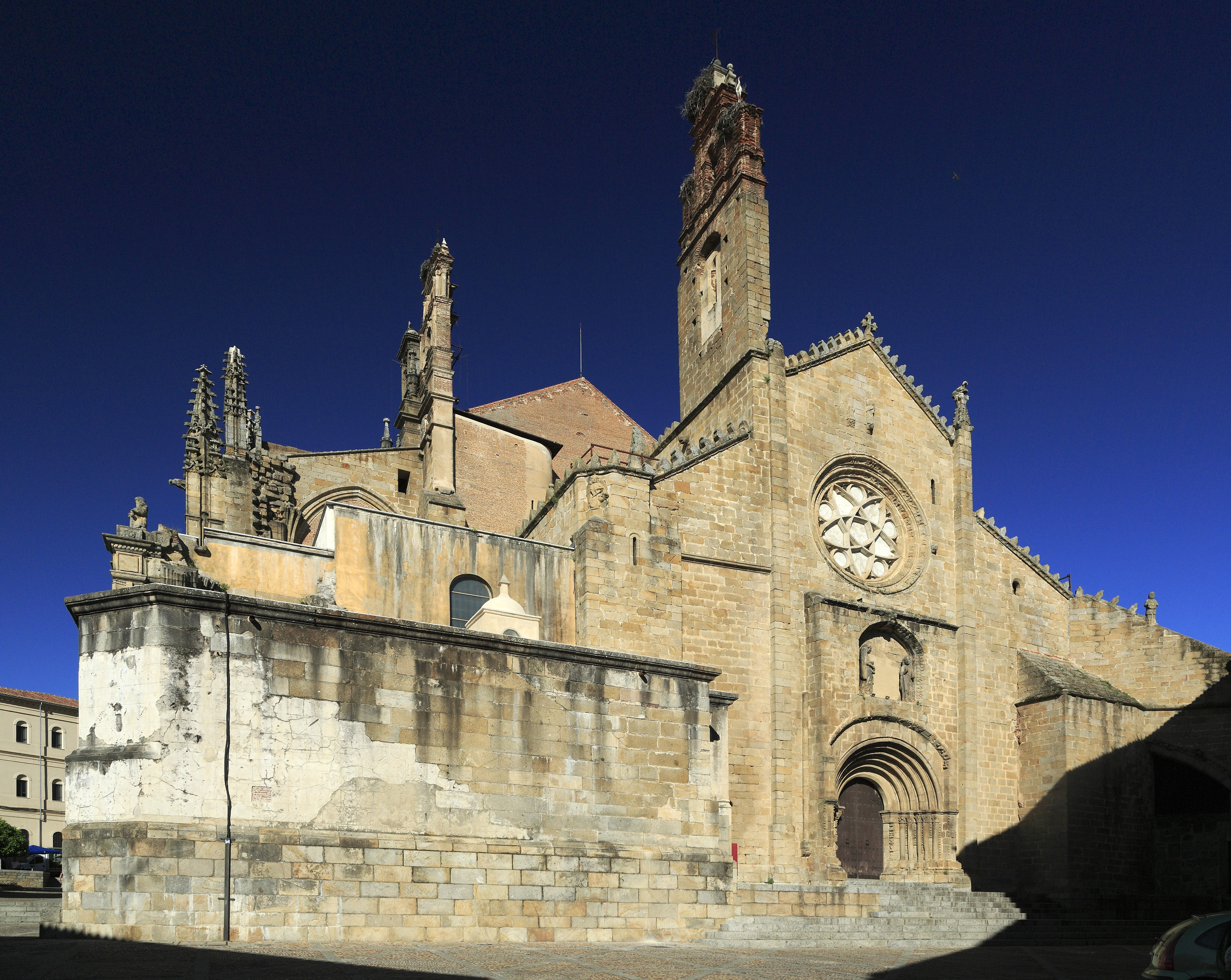
- Façade of the cathedral
- Old Cathedral of Plasencia
- 40°01′41″N 6°05′28″W
- Location: Plasencia, Spain
- Denomination: Roman Catholic Church

Architecture
- Heritage designation: Bien de Interés Cultural
- Style: Romantic, Gothic
- Years built: 13th–15th centuries

Administration
- Diocese: Roman Catholic Diocese of Plasencia

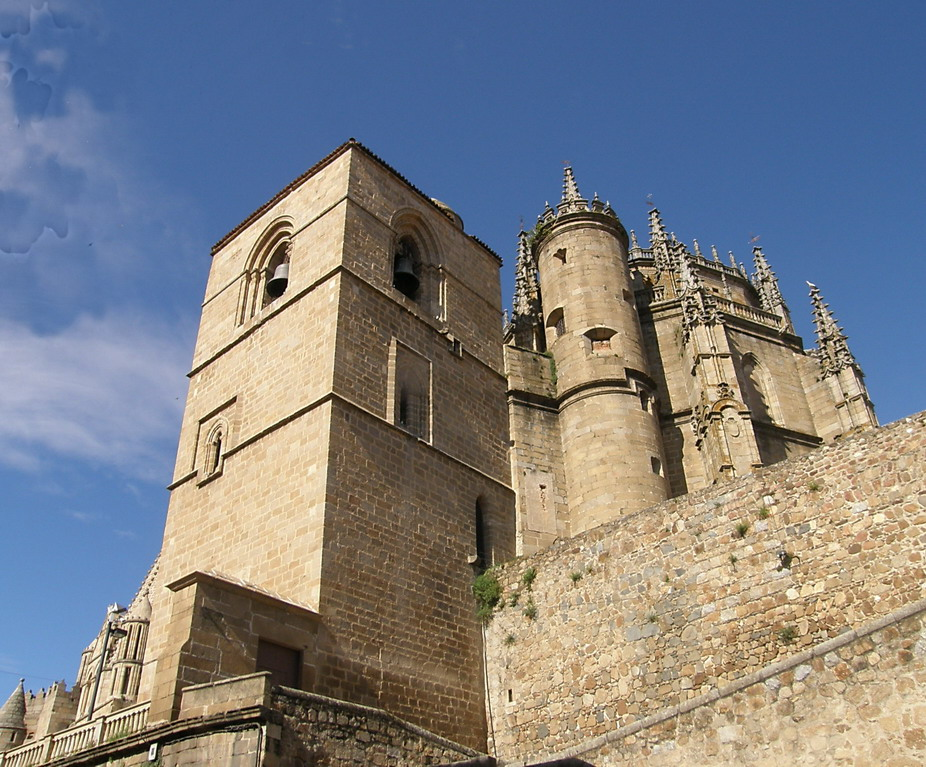
Bell tower

The Old Cathedral of Plasencia (Spanish: Catedral vieja de Plasencia or Catedral de Santa María) is a Roman Catholic church in Plasencia, Cáceres Province, Extremadura, Spain. It is one of two cathedrals in Plasencia, the other being the New Cathedral.

Commonly known as the Plasencia Cathedral Museum, the building exemplifies the transition from Romanesque to Gothic architecture and is one of the town's most notable landmarks.

Construction began in the early 13th century, with the last elements in the Proto-Gothic style added in the 15th century. Architects such as Juan Francés, Juan Pérez, and Diego Díaz oversaw construction during these centuries. The building is currently designated a Bien de Interés Cultural ("Good of Cultural Interest").

== History ==
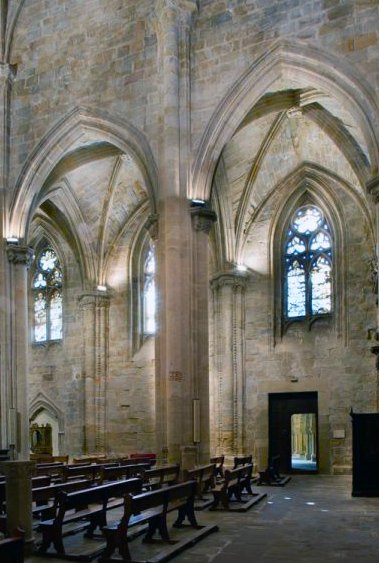
Interior

The Old Cathedral of Plasencia is an example of transitional architecture, exhibiting elements of both Romanesque and Gothic styles. The Romanesque influence is evident in the fustes (shafts) and capitals of its columns, while the Gothic style is seen in the arches and windows, revealed during a recent restoration. Its three naves were concealed by a thick layer of lime applied in the 18th century. Only after this layer decayed could observers appreciate the cathedral's slender and imposing structure.

The construction of the cathedral occurred in three stages. During the second stage, in the 14th century, the church, the bell tower, and the eastern and southern sections of the cloister were completed.

The third and final stage took place in the 15th century. During this period, the main chapel of the church was modified, and the construction of the cloister was finished on the west and south sides. However, foundation problems were encountered, leading to the collapse of part of the western portal. This necessitated a renovation that included the creation of new burial chapels within the church. The final master builders of the cathedral were Juan Martín and Bishop Pedro Jiménez.

By decree of June 3, 1931, the cathedral was declared a Monumento Histórico-Artístico (Historical-Artistic Monument) belonging to the National Artistic Treasury of Spain.

Part of the cathedral now houses the Cathedral Museum of Plasencia, which displays a collection of paintings and sculptures by Spanish and Flemish Renaissance artists, including Luis de Morales and Gerard David. The museum also exhibits religious ornaments and devotional objects dating from the 15th to the 17th centuries.

== Building ==
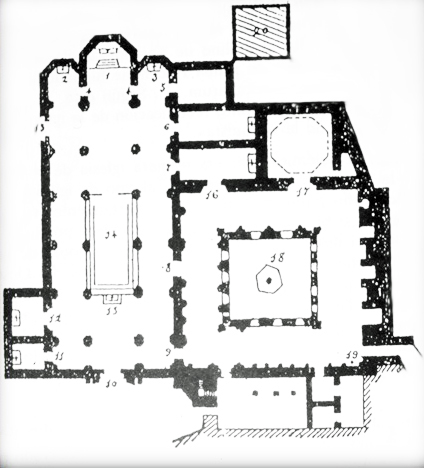
Original floor plan of the Old Cathedral.

The extant portions of the building reveal its Romanesque origins, although some elements approach the Proto-Gothic style. Originally a three-aisled Romanesque church with a larger central apse and two smaller flanking apses, the current structure has three aisles without apses. The central nave retains its original ribbed tierced vaults, while the lateral naves have simpler vaults.

The original rear wall was formed by the main chapel, separated from the main nave by a small stairway. Two smaller chapels flanked the main chapel, one on each side. The chapel on the gospel side was dedicated to the crucifix, while the chapel on the epistle side was known as Our Lady of Forgiveness or Our Lady of the Blessed Sacrament due to the tabernacle housed there. The statues from these chapels have been relocated, some to the Chapel of San Pablo and others to the New Cathedral. Today, a carving of the young Virgin Mary is venerated in a small altarpiece within the central chapel.

=== Main Entrance ===
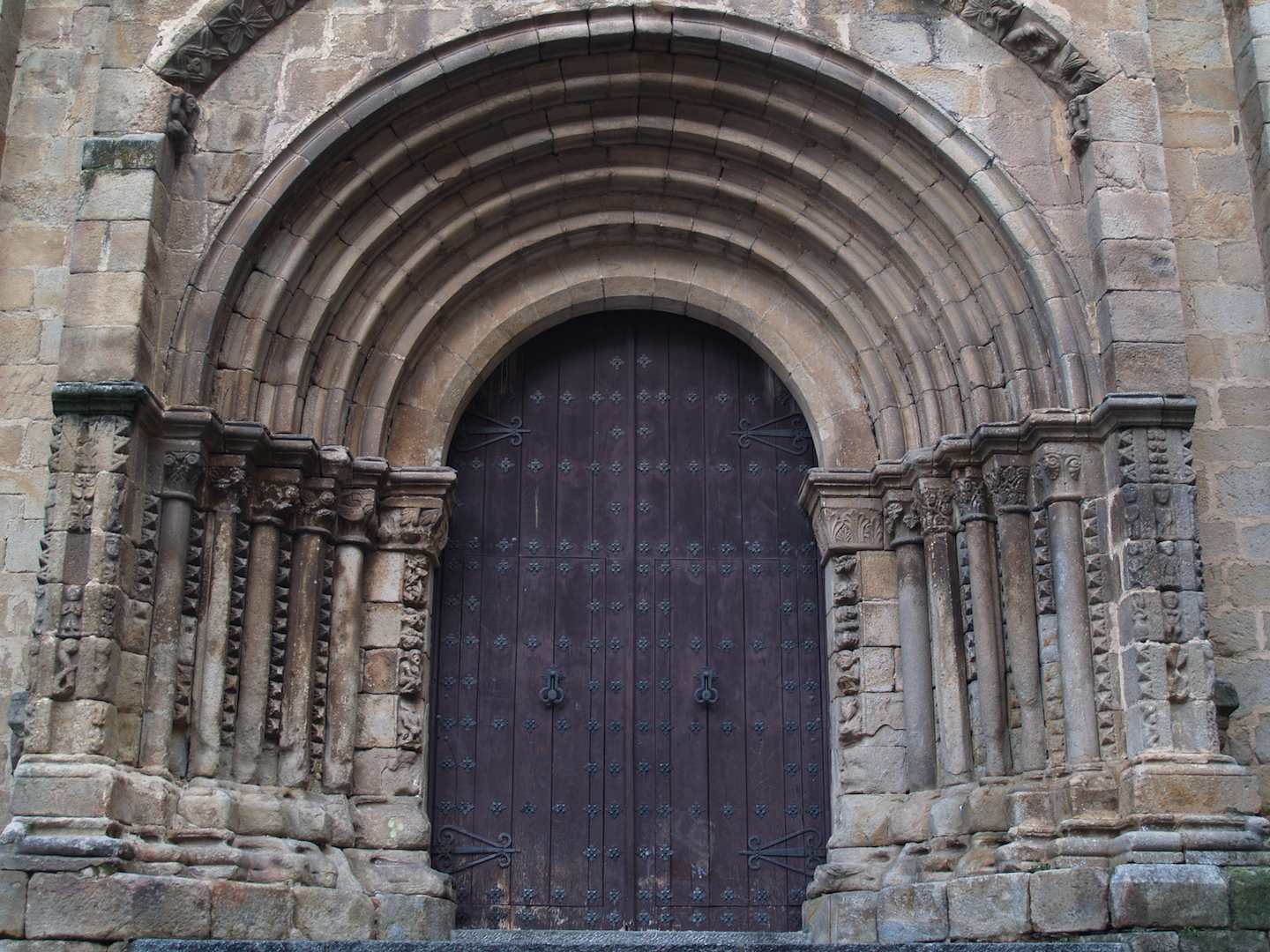
The Western Entrance

The main entrance is an example of Romanesque architecture. It features semicircular arches with archivolts, above which is a sculptural group carved in stone depicting the Annunciation of the Virgin Mary. The Virgin Mary is also depicted in a small image on the rose window, with a praying angel before her.

=== Cloister ===
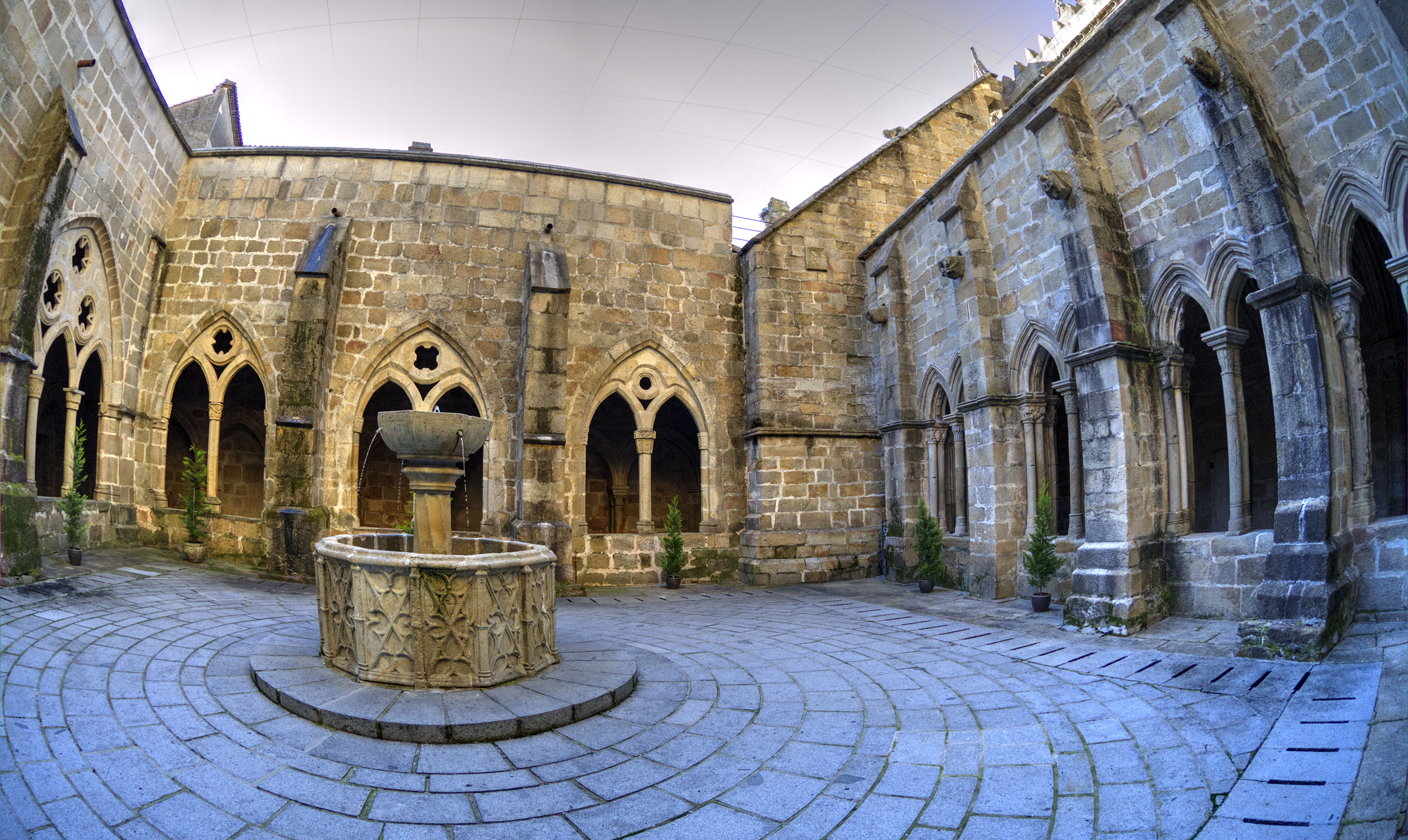
Cloister of the Cathedrals.

The cloister, with an irregular plan, exemplifies the transition from Romanesque to Gothic architecture typical of medieval cathedrals. Its columns and capitals, featuring biblical scenes, are reminiscent of the Romanesque style, while the arches and ribbed vaults point towards the Gothic. The west and south naves are built in the Cistercian style.

The center of the courtyard features a Gothic fountain from the 15th century, bearing the coats of arms of Bishop and Cardinal Juan de Carvajal.

The center of the courtyard features a Gothic fountain from the 15th century, bearing the coats of arms of Bishop and Cardinal Juan de Carvajal.

=== Chapel of San Pablo or Torre del Melón ===
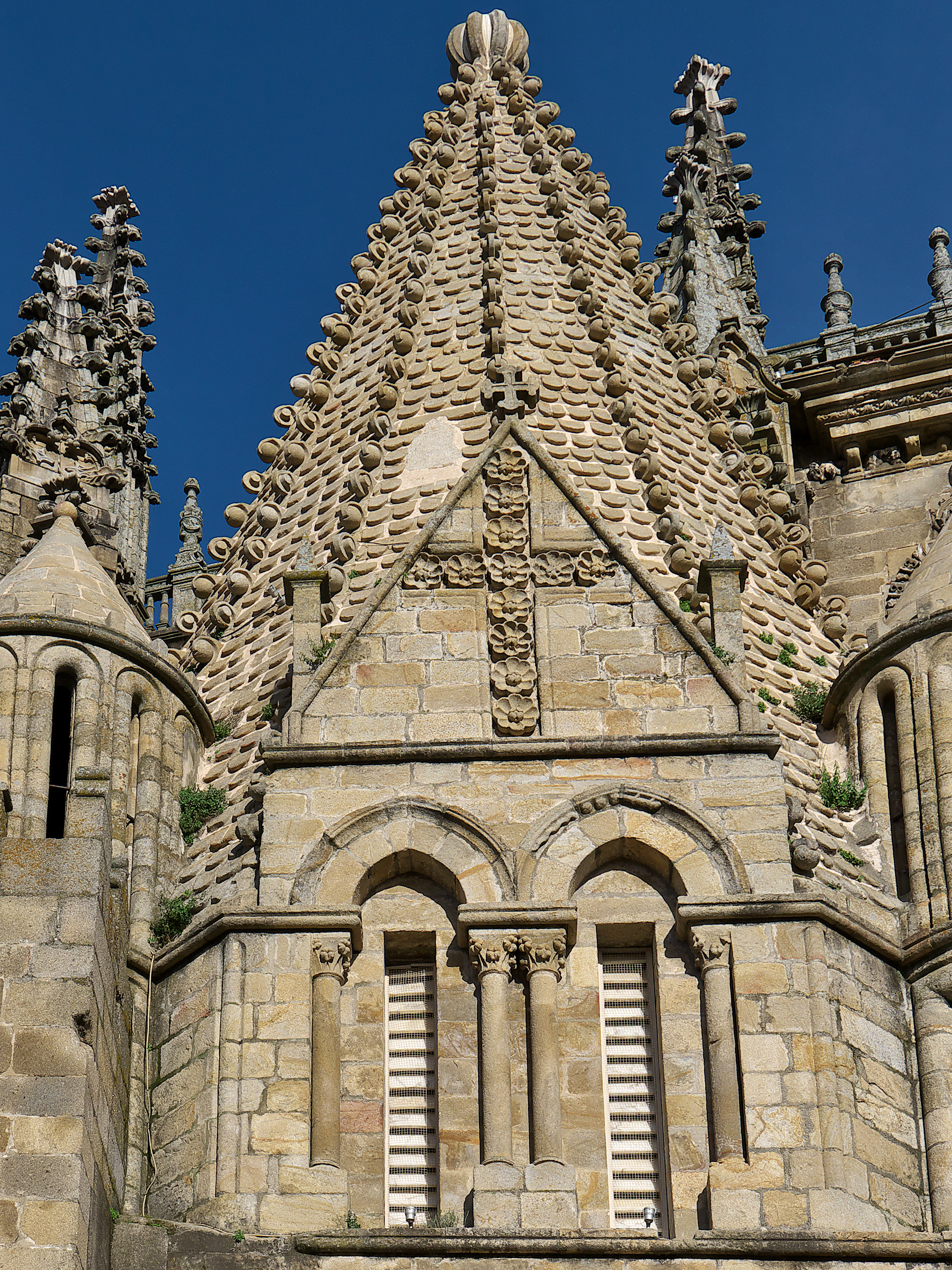
Exterior of the Torre del Melón.

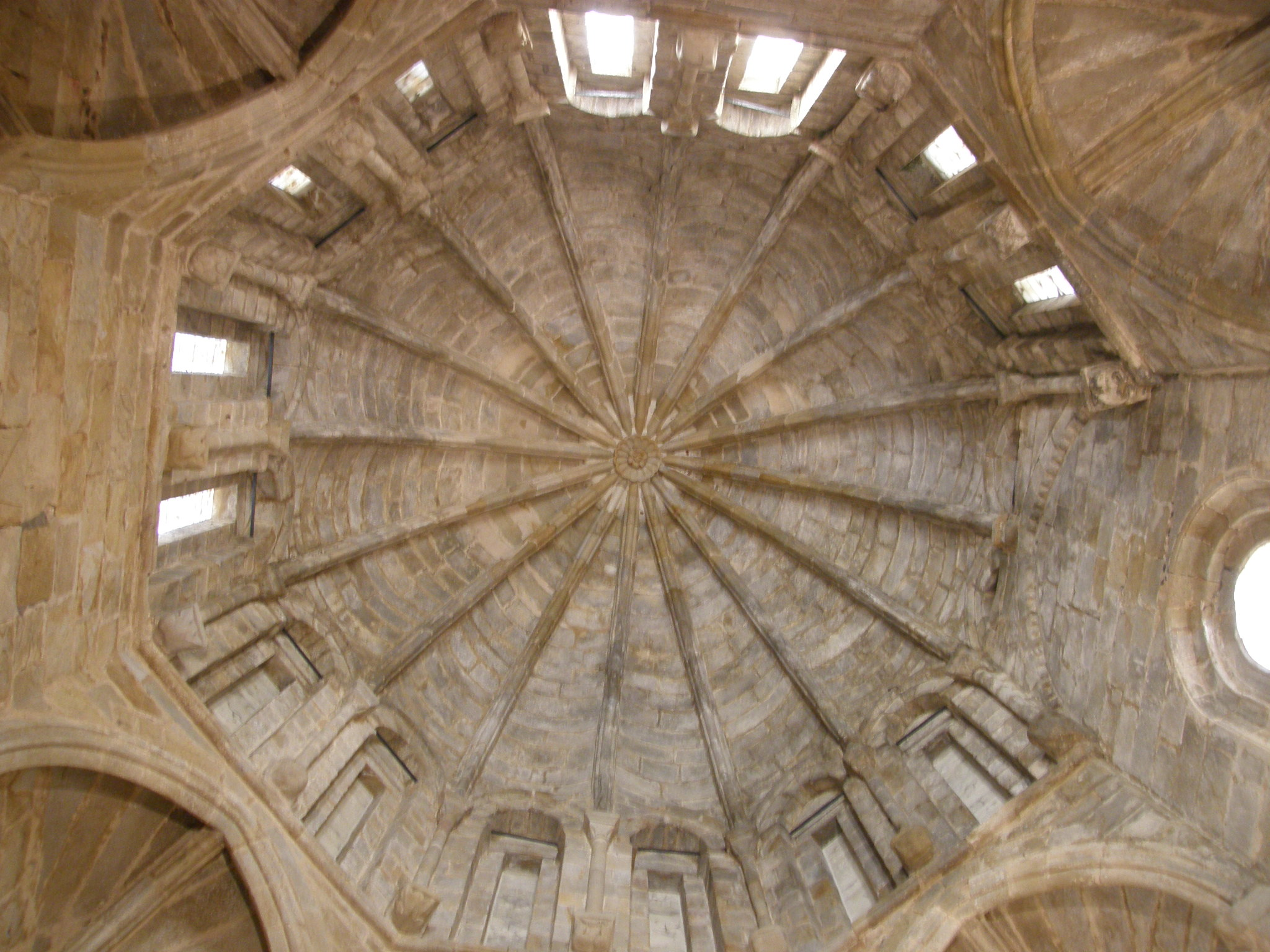
Interior of the Torre del Melón.

The most prominent feature of the Romanesque Old Cathedral in Plasencia is undoubtedly the Chapter House, also known as the Chapel of San Pablo or, popularly, the Torre del Melón (Melon Tower) for the grooved sphere at its summit.

The Chapel of San Pablo follows the model of the "lantern towers" found in the cathedrals of Zamora and Salamanca (Kingdom of León), the collegiate church of Toro, and the Cathedral of Évora (Portugal). Its origins lie in French Romanesque architecture, particularly religious buildings of the Poitou region. Miguel Sobrino suggests the now-lost Romanesque dome over the Cathedral of Santiago de Compostela may be the earliest example of this dome type, also used in the Old Cathedral of Plasencia. The Plasencia dome is undoubtedly the latest of all and closely resembles the Torre del Gallo of the Old Cathedral of Salamanca in its construction. The most likely date for its completion is 1270, by master builder Gil de Císlar, possibly a master stonemason trained in the workshop of Petrus Petri.

The chapter house is a square room that transitions into an octagon through ribbed vaulting with sixteen ribs. The exterior features a double-layered, conical dome with a steep profile. This dome is covered in scale-like layers that help prevent rainwater erosion. The highest point is crowned by a fluted sphere, which gives the tower its popular name.

Over time, the chapter house's use has changed to adapt to new needs. In 1508, it housed the library donated by Dr. Gutiérrez Álvarez. In 1544, it became the main chapel while the cathedral's back wall was demolished.

== See also ==
- New Cathedral of Plasencia
- High medieval domes

== Bibliography ==
- CALLE CALLE, Francisco Vicente, Plasencia. "Misterios" en las Catedrales, www.bubok.com, 2008.
- ARAUJO, S. NADAL, J. "Restauración del conjunto Catedrales-Palacio Episcopal de Plasencia", 1995.
- Gómez Moreno, Manuel (1941). Las águilas del renacimiento español: Barlolomé Ordóñez, Diego Siloé, Pedro Machuca, Alonso Berruguete. 1517-1558. Gráficas Uguina.
- La arquitectura religiosa en Plasencia. Las catedrales Antigua y nueva. VIII Centenario de la diócesis de Plasencia. Jornadas de estudios históricos. pp. 107 a 142 . Plasencia 1990.
- Las catedrales de Plasencia. Rev. El Urogallo, diciembre de 1995.
