= Louis Morales =

Louis Morales may refer to:

- Louis de Morales (died 1586), Spanish painter
- Louis Morales, see List of The Walking Dead (TV series) characters
