= Marcos Soares Pereira =

Portuguese composer

Marcos Soares Pereira (died 1655) was a Portuguese composer and mestre da Capela Real. He was the brother of the famous Portuguese composer João Lourenço Rebelo.

== Life ==
Marcos Soares Pereira was born in Caminha most probably at the end of the 16th century, as the son of João Soares Pereira and Maria Lourenço Rebelo. Little is known about his musical studies and when or where he was ordained priest. In 1624 Pereira was admitted as chaplain-singer at the Ducal Palace of Vila Viçosa, the ancestral seat of the Dukes of Braganza, the most important title in the peerage of Portugal in the middle of the 17th century. In 1629 Pereira replaced Robert Turner (c. 1578-1629) as mestre de capela.

After the overthrow of the Philippine Dynasty on 1 December 1640, which had ruled Portugal since 1580, João, Duke of Braganza became king and the ducal chapel moved from Vila Viçosa to Lisbon. In 1641, after the retirement of Filipe de Magalhães, Marcos Soares Pereira was appointed mestre da Capela Real, a position he held until his death in 1655.

== Musical work ==
None of Pereira’s musical work survived to the present day, most likely due to the Lisbon earthquake of November 1, 1755, with the destruction of the Music Royal Library. Nevertheless, the library catalog partially survived and there we can find the entry for fifty-eight of Pereira’s compositions, fifty-four vilancicos and four psalms, Confitebor, Beatus Vir, Laudate Pueri and Laudate Dominum.
