= Álvaro García de Zúñiga =

Álvaro García de Zúñiga (born 1958) is a Uruguayan-born Portuguese playwright, poet and composer from Montevideo. Notable plays include Teatro Impossível, O Teatro é Puro Cinema, Sur Scène et Marne, Lecture d'un texte pour le Théâtre and Conferência de Imprensa.

== See also ==
- List of Portuguese composers
