= Estêvão Lopes Morago =

Estêvão Lopes Morago (Spanish: Esteban Lopez Morago) (c. 1575 in Vallecas, Spain – 1630 in Viseu, Portugal) was a Spanish-born composer who studied, lived, worked and died in Portugal. He is one of the most important polyphonists in the music history of Portugal. Another representative of the high level of cultural interchanges between the two countries, as some of the highest figures of the peninsular cultural history have moved around between the two countries freely and mostly in a way unrelated to the political events of the time (Diego Velázquez was of Portuguese origin; and Alonso Sánchez Coello are some of the examples).

== Life ==
Lopes Morago was born in Vallecas, near Madrid, but he passed the vast majority of his life in Portugal. He was a student of Filipe de Magalhães at the Cathedral of Évora, where he obtained his licentiate degree. After that, in August 1599, he went to the Cathedral of Viseu where he was appointed canon and mestre de capela.

In 1626, the chapter of the Cathedral allowed him to go to Lisbon to publish his works. These included the Livro Comum and the Vesperal, which have survived.

The place and year of his death are uncertain. There are indications that Morago moved to Spain and died there about 1628. However, a later document (1630) states that Morago had retired to a Franciscan monastery in Viseu (Convento de Orgens) and died there.

== Works ==
Morago composed motets, responsories, psalms, Magnificats, and a Requiem. His work is considered to be highly innovative in the Iberian Peninsula.

The musicologist Manuel Joaquim considered his motet Oculi mei "genial and worthy of the renown of Palestrina's O vos omnes, or Hoc die".

The British composer Ivan Moody wrote:

...what causes special impact in the music of Morago is the usage of the dissonance, and (...) an interest in antiphonary effects. Motets such as Oculi mei, of ambiguous key and intercalated with numberless diminished fourths, demonstrate perfectly the expressiveness of this harmonic audacity. The alternances of this kind of intense imitative composition painstakingly elaborated with sudden twitches of rhythmical homophony are also typical of the works Versa est in luctum and Commissa mea; in fact, the work of Morago for penitential and funerary texts is extremely sensitive.

The works of Morago are kept in the archives of Viseu. The Fundação Calouste Gulbenkian published most of them in the book Obras de Música Religiosa (Portugaliae Musica IV, 1961).

== Recordings ==
- 1993, Portuguese Renaissance Music, Voces Angelicae, Teldec Classics International 4509-93690-2
  - includes 5 works by Morago.
- 1994, Music of the Portuguese Renaissance, Pro Cantione Antiqua, Hyperion CDA66715
  - includes 10 works by Morago
