= João Lourenço Rebelo =

Portuguese composer

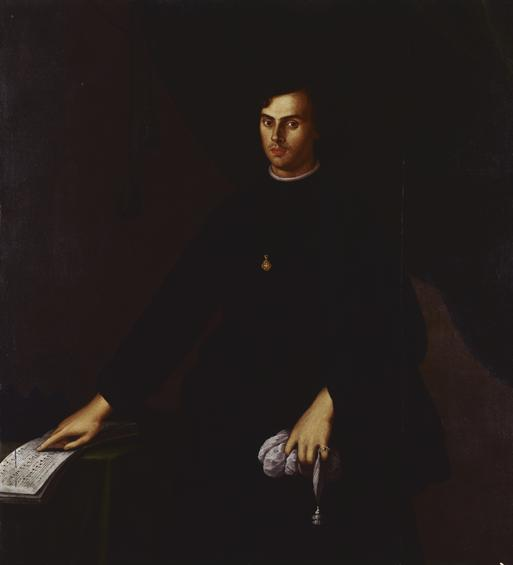
- Portrait by José de Avelar Rebelo, c. 1646.
- Born: 1610; Caminha, Minho Province
- Died: 16 November 1661; Loures, Estremadura Province
- Occupation: Composer

João Lourenço Rebelo, or João Soares Rebelo (1610 – 16 November 1661) was the only Portuguese composer to adopt the Venetian polychoral style. Despite his closeness to King John IV of Portugal (1603–1656), and despite what is traditionally said, Rebelo never held any office in the royal household.

== Life ==
Rebelo was born in Caminha in 1610, the son of João Soares Pereira and Maria Lourenço Rebelo. In 1624, he became a choir boy at the Ducal Palace of Vila Viçosa, the ancestral seat of the Dukes of Braganza, while his older brother, Father Marcos Soares Pereira (?-1655) was admitted as chaplain-singer.

In keeping with the aristocratic patterns of behavior of the 17th century, and as a sign of pre-eminence, Teodósio II, the 7th Duke of Braganza (1568-1630) had created an academy for court musicians, the Colégio dos Santos Reis Magos (College of the Three Wise Kings), where Rebelo studied under Robert Turner (c.1578-1629), an Irish musician who himself had been a student of the Flemish composer Géry de Ghersem, and mestre de capela of the ducal chapel from 1616, and possibly also under Friar Manuel Cardoso, one of the most famous and influential Portuguese composers of the time. Unlike what is traditionally said, Rebelo didn't become music teacher of the Duke’s heir João, the Duke of Barcelos (who was six years older than him); they simply struck up a friendship that was to endure the rest of his life.

After the overthrow of the Philippine Dynasty on 1 December 1640, which had ruled Portugal since 1580, João became King of Portugal (King John IV) and the ducal chapel moved from Vila Viçosa to Lisbon. Both brothers moved to the capital in the King's retinue and in 1641 Marcos became mestre da Capela Real of the Royal Chapel.

In 1646 Rebelo was made a nobleman, Fidalgo de juro e herdade, of the Royal House and knighted with the Order of Christ, a position with significant financial benefits, the Comenda of São Bartolomeu de Rabal, providing an annual income of two hundred thousand réis. In 1652 Rebelo married Maria de Macedo, daughter of Domingos de Macedo, governor of Monção.

There are three clear pieces of evidence that prove King John's friendship with and admiration of Rebelo: the dedication of his own musical treatise Defensa de la musica moderna (In Defense of modern music), published anonymously in 1650, a letter to the Portuguese agent in Rome, and a paragraph in his last will and testament.

In the first case, the King turned the tables on protocol and wrote in the dedication to the treatise: “To Senhor Ivan Lorenço Rabelo (…). This monograph written in Defense of the Modern Composition and Composers is dedicated to you, (…) having seen the book of your four, five, and six-part masses; the music for ten, twelve, seventeen and twenty voices (…) and if they have not yet been published it is not because they fear the light but because they have not been given to it; but they will appear in due course. God preserve you”.

In the case of the letter to the Portuguese agent in Rome, dating from March 1654, the King wrote: “I have prepared some books for the press [containing] a complete series of vesper psalms, and other pieces for different choirs and voices by Juan Lourenço Rabelo (…)”.

And in the last case, two days before his death, King John wrote in his will (4 November 1656): “I have ordered the works of João Rebello to be printed in Italy at my expense; I bestow this on him and leaving 20 books in my library, he must distribute the remainder in Castille, Italy, France and other parts as he thinks fit.”. Choosing a Roman printer can be interpreted as a means of bringing pressure to bear on the Papal States, which still had not recognized Portugal's independence from Spain. According to a contemporary Dutch translation of the will, the books were printed in Holland, not in Italy.

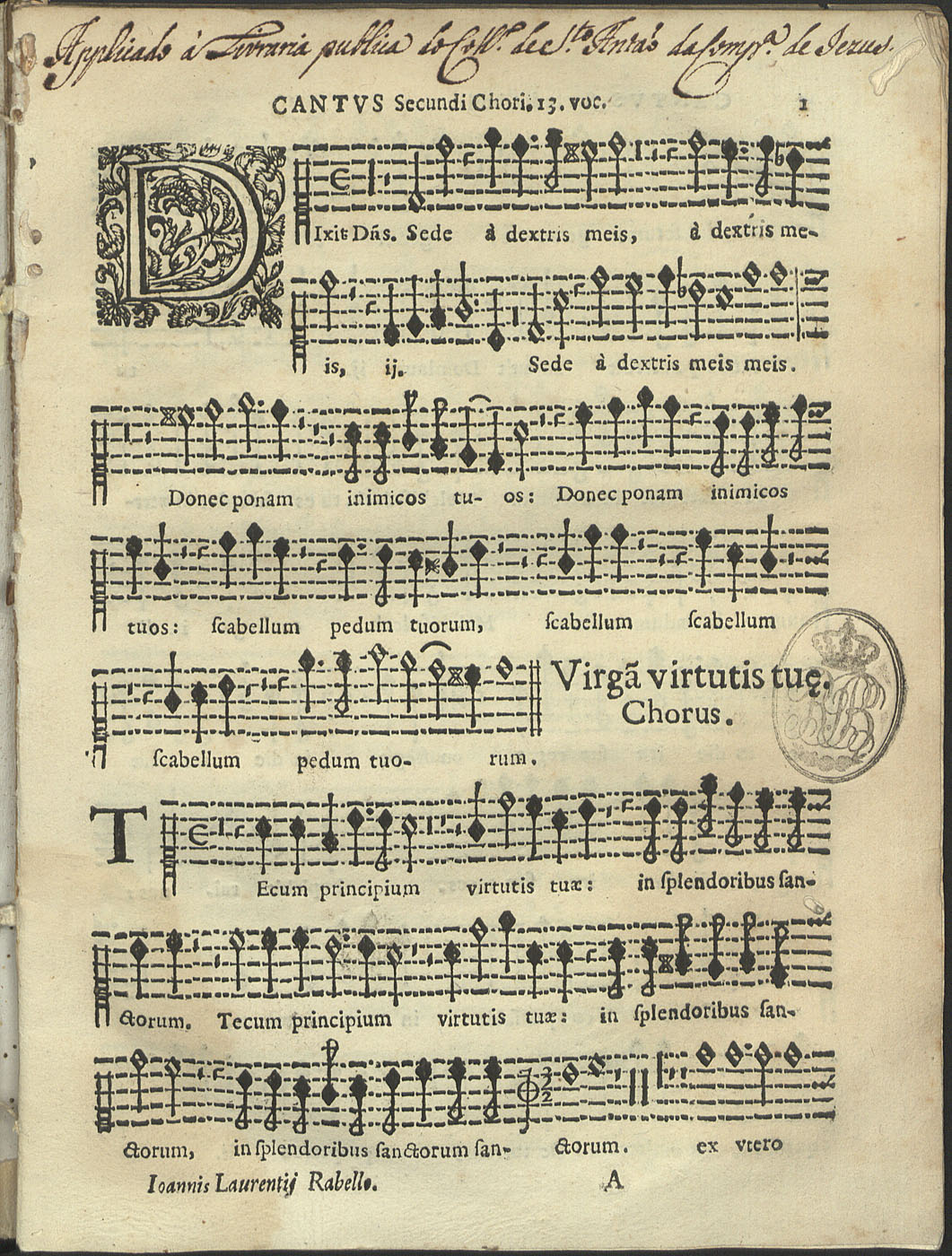
Example of the 1657 edition of the Psalms of Rebelo, Rome

In 1657 the workshop of Maurizio and Amadeo de Belmonte, in Rome, printed the collection of 33 pieces dated between 1636 and 1653, in the form of seventeen booklets respectively for voice and instrument, under the title Joannis Laurentii Rabello Psalmi, tum Vesperarum tum Completarum. Item Magnificat, Lamentationes et Miserere (Psalms, both of Vespers and of Compline. [And] also the Magnificat, the Lamentationes and the Miserere by João Lourenço Rebelo). Only one single copy of this edition had been preserved, thanks to the Italian priest Fortunato Santini (1776-1861), and is now preserved in the library of the Episcopal Seminary of Münster. A modern transcription was released in 1982 by Calouste Gulbenkian Foundation monumenta edition Portugaliae Musica. In addition, four volumes of the original impression survived in the Biblioteca Nacional de Portugal, from the Jesuit College of Santo Antão.

João Lourenço Rebelo died at Apelação (Loures) on 16 November 1661.

== Music, style and influence ==
Currently, only forty-four compositions are known from Rebelo, all published by Portugaliae Musica. Unfortunately, most of his works vanished in the Lisbon earthquake of November 1, 1755, with the destruction of the Music Royal Library. Any considerations made about Rebelo's music, style and influence are confined to this set of compositions.

Rebelo is a good illustration of the intriguing juxtaposition of tradition and innovation in Western music during most of the 17th century. In the words of the Portuguese musicologist João Pedro d’Alvarenga “Rebelo's music appears to us as a strange monument in the little-known musical landscape of 17th-century Portugal. In its abstract architectural quality, inclined more to ignore than to underline the text, in the sound effects ranging from massive to transparent, erected in a diversified play of frequently asymmetrical combinations of voices and instruments, in the demanding instrumental writings and the vocal ornamentation, it leans more to the style of 17th-century northern Italian composers to whose works Rebelo had had privileged access in the rich musical library belonging to King João IV. But it does not ignore the contrapuntal refinement typical of the Portuguese composers of the preceding generations”.

Rebelo was one of the first Portuguese composers to write specific parts for instruments in his sacred works. Although he did not specified which instruments would play, most of his compositions have obbligato parts labeled vox instrumentalis. They also have a basso continuo. However, few if any figures are included to indicate the nature of the chords. Melodically, the basso continuo always follows the bass tone and thus rather takes on the character of a basso seguente.

In his compositions, Rebelo strives for strong contrasts in sound and in the very texture of the musical architecture, mixing choirs of singers, solo singers, and voices and instruments. We can find Cantus firmus sung on long notes as the basis of splendid concertato counterpoint for six vox instrumentalis, like in Educes me (Psalm 31, verse 5), the endless repetition of musical figuration in Super Aspidem (Psalm 19, verse 13 – with 13 parts) or the typical sonorities of Monteverdi's madrigals in the charming Qui habitat (Psalm 91, verse 1-6).

At the same time Rebelo knows how to evoke the Roman School polyphony, like is in seven-part motet Panis angelicus, full of harmonic false relations or in his Lamentationes, in which the composer achieves effects through the use of piercing chromatic harmonies.

There is no evidence of Rebelo's music being played in the Royal Chapel, which is not surprising since Rebelo has not held any official position. The king himself says, in the dedication of his musical treatise, that he saw Rebelo's music books not heard his music. We may consider the hypothesis of private musical sessions, only with the king attending but, again, the absence of documentary evidence in this matter, refers us to the field of assumptions.

Probably, most of Rebelo's compositions were made in a theoretical and aesthetic sense, looking for a particular style or concept of music more than the display of contrapuntal virtuosity or secure a place in History. As Paul Van Nevel says regarding Rebelo's music: “For him, music was an absolute art with its own ideas that were not necessarily connected to any text (…). One must conclude that Rebelo wrote in the way that momentarily suited him: he either composed music to serve a text or music in which the text is only a background for the expression of purely musical ideas”.

== Modern editions ==
- Psalmi tum Vesperarum, tum Completorii: Item Magnificat Lamentationes e Miserere, Vol. I / João Lourenço Rebelo / 1982 / ISBN 972-666-035-1
- Psalmi tum Vesperarum, tum Completorii: Item Magnificat Lamentationes e Miserere, Vol. II / João Lourenço Rebelo / 1982 / ISBN 972-666-036-X
- Psalmi tum Vesperarum, tum Completorii: Item Magnificat Lamentationes e Miserere, Vol. III / João Lourenço Rebelo / 1982 / ISBN 972-666-055-6
- Psalmi tum Vesperarum, tum Completorii: Item Magnificat Lamentationes e Miserere, Vol. IV / João Lourenço Rebelo / 1982 / ISBN 972-666-054-8

== Recordings ==
- 1996 Sacred Music from Seventeenth Century Portugal Melgás & Rebelo. The Sixteen, dir. Harry Christophers, Collins Classics 1465, reissued as Coro 16020
- 2000 Rebelo Vesper Psalms and Lamentations. Huelgas Ensemble, dir. Paul Van Nevel, Sony Vivarte 53115
- 2002 João Lourenço Rebelo Psalmi, Magnificat & Lamentationes. Currend, Erik van Nevel, Eufoda 1344
