= Zamora Cathedral =

Catholic cathedral in Spain

Coordinates: 41.49898°N 5.75464°W

Zamora Cathedral Catedral de Zamora
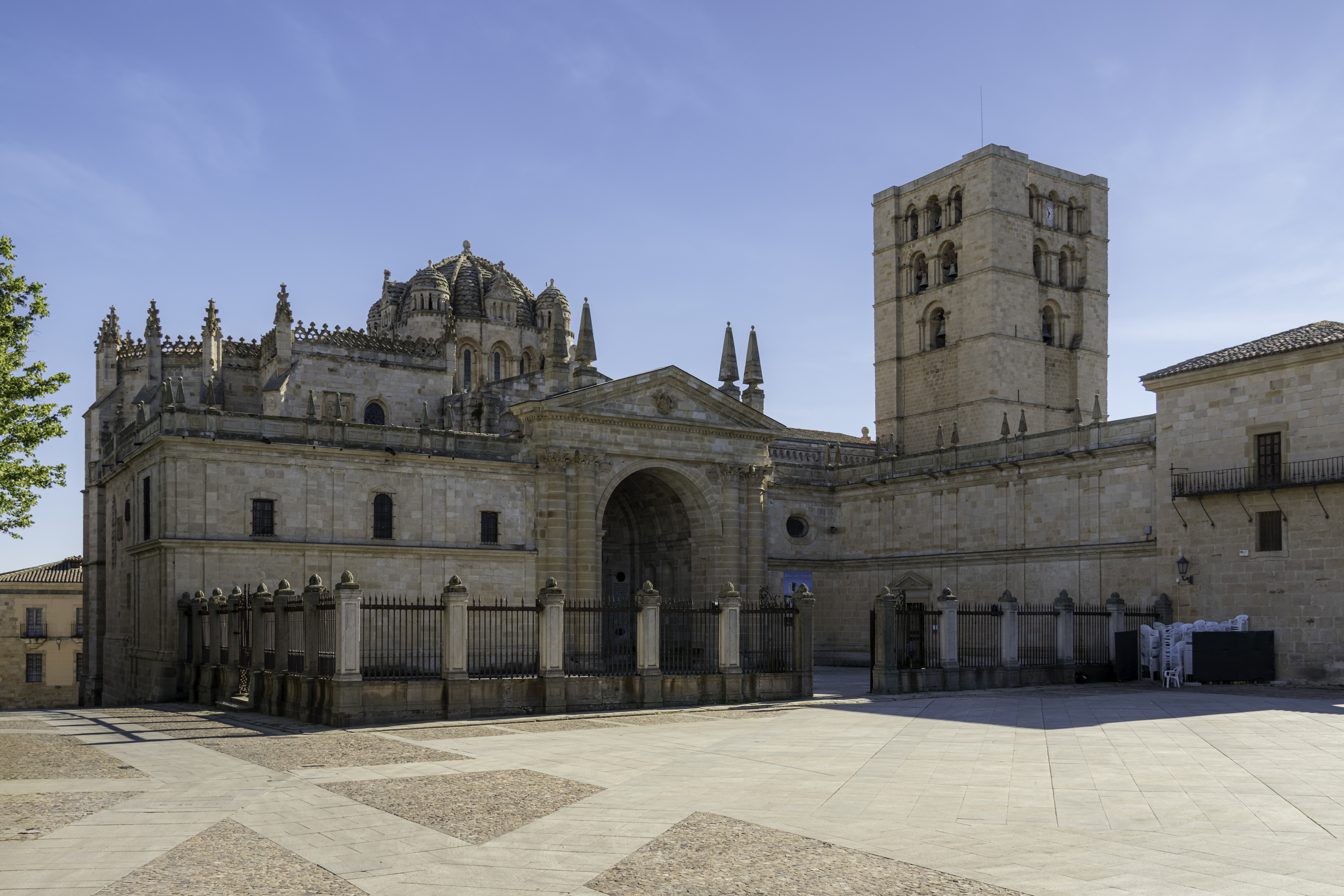
- North façade.
- Zamora Cathedral; Catedral de Zamora
- Location: Zamora
- Country: Spain
- Denomination: Catholic Church

Architecture
- Architectural type: church
- Style: Romanesque
- Groundbreaking: 1140
- Completed: 1174

Administration
- Diocese: Diocese of Zamora

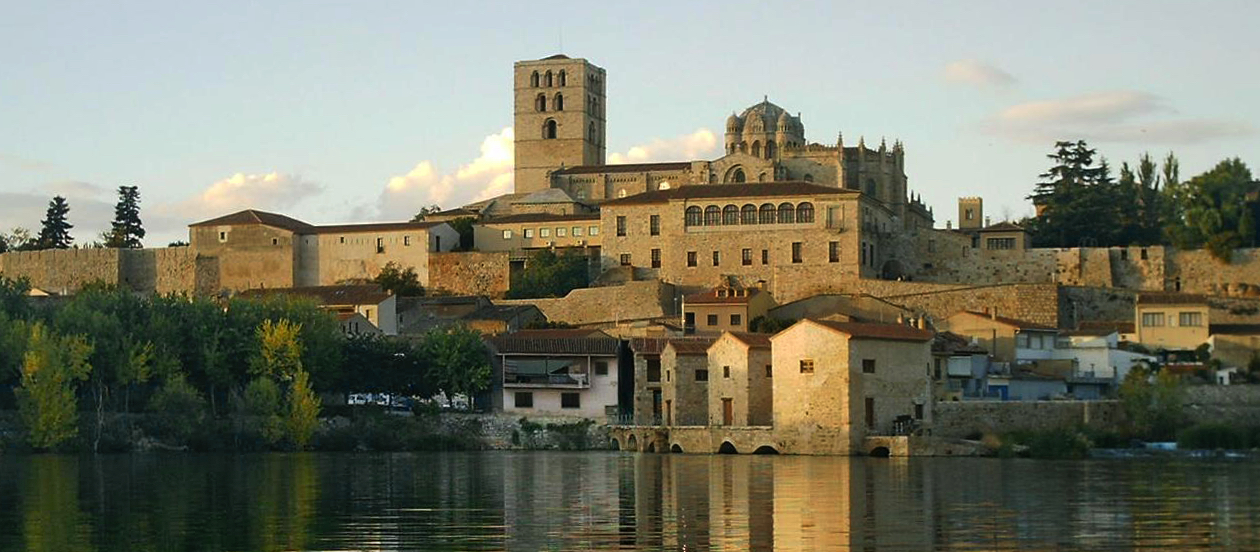
Overview of the Castle and Cathedral of Zamora.

The Cathedral of Zamora is a Catholic cathedral in Zamora, in Castile and León, Spain, located above the right bank of the Duero It remains surrounded by its old walls and gates.

Built between 1151 and 1174, it is one of the finest examples of Spanish Romanesque architecture.

== History ==
A previous church, also entitled El Salvador ("Holy Savior") existed at the time of King Alfonso VII of Castile but it was apparently in ruins, so that the king donated the church of St. Thomas in the city to act as cathedral.

The church was built under Bishop Esteban of the Diocese of Zamora, under the patronage of Alfonso VII and his sister, Sancha Raimúndez. The date of construction (1151–1174) is traditionally attested by an epigraphy in the northern side of the transept, although recent discoveries have proven that the church had been already begun in 1139, at the time of bishop Bernardo.

The cathedral was consecrated in 1174 by bishop Esteban, and works continued under his successor Guillermo (1176–1192), including the transept. The cloister and the bell tower date to the first half of the 13th century. The designer of the church is unknown.

== Overview ==
The building, in Romanesque style, is on the Latin cross plan; it has a nave and two aisles, a short transept and three semicircular apses. The latter were replaced by Gothic ones in the 15th century. The transept is covered by barrel vault, the aisles by groin vault, and the nave by cross vault in late-Romanesque or Proto-Gothic style.

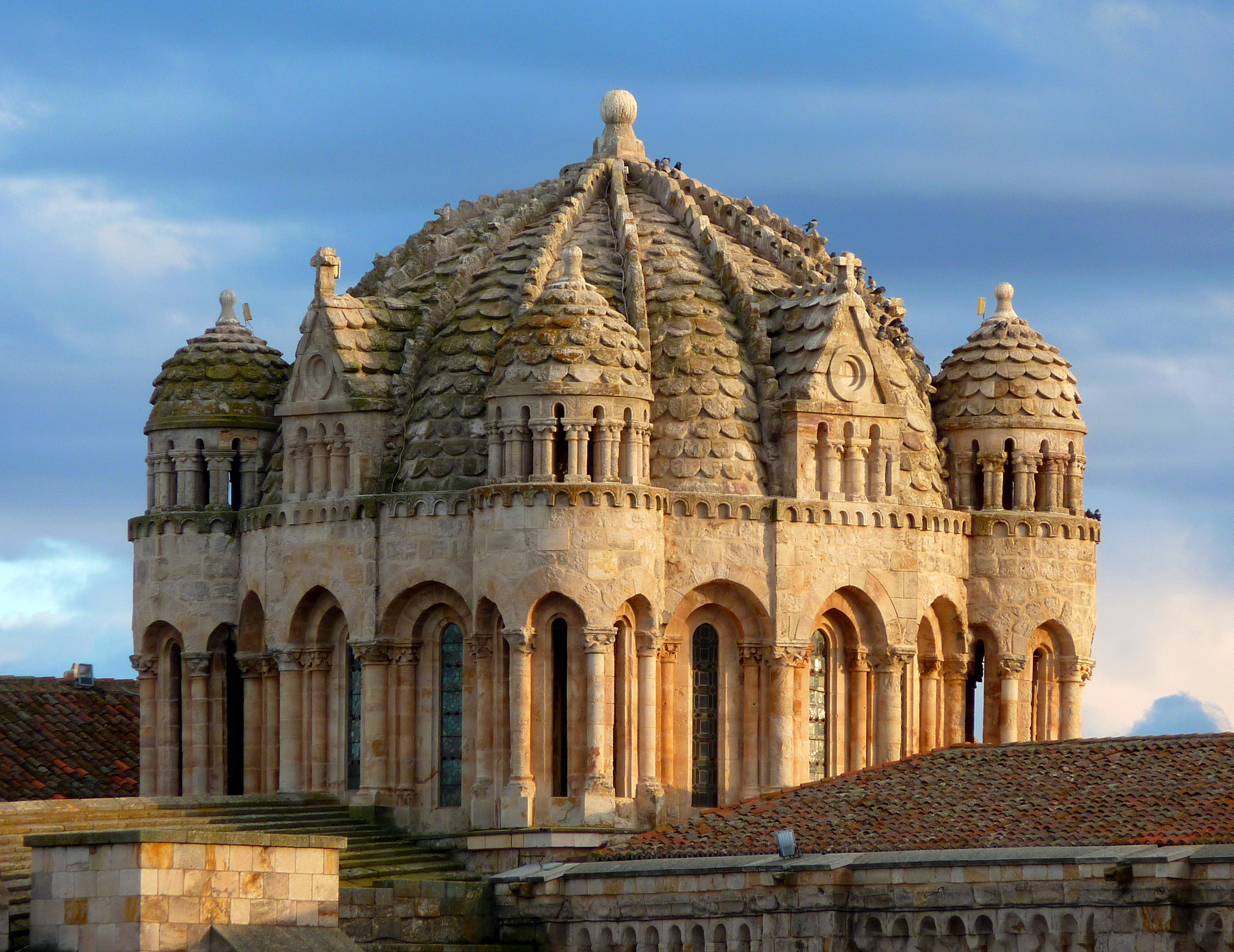
The dome.

Over the transept is the dome-tower, featuring 16 side narrow and tall semicircular windows enclosed in and between four turrets. These support two domes, an external one with a slightly pointed top, and an interior one with semicircular shape. Over the turrets are small domes, also with columns and thin windows, and tympani with similar decoration. With its exterior, original scale decoration, the dome is one of the symbols of the city. Similar domes are found in other churches of the Duero valley (Salamanca, Toro, Plasencia, Evora). Several inspirations for the dome have been proposed, from Byzantium to France. Miguel Sobrino has argued for a now-disappeared Romanesque dome over the Cathedral of Santiago de Compostela.

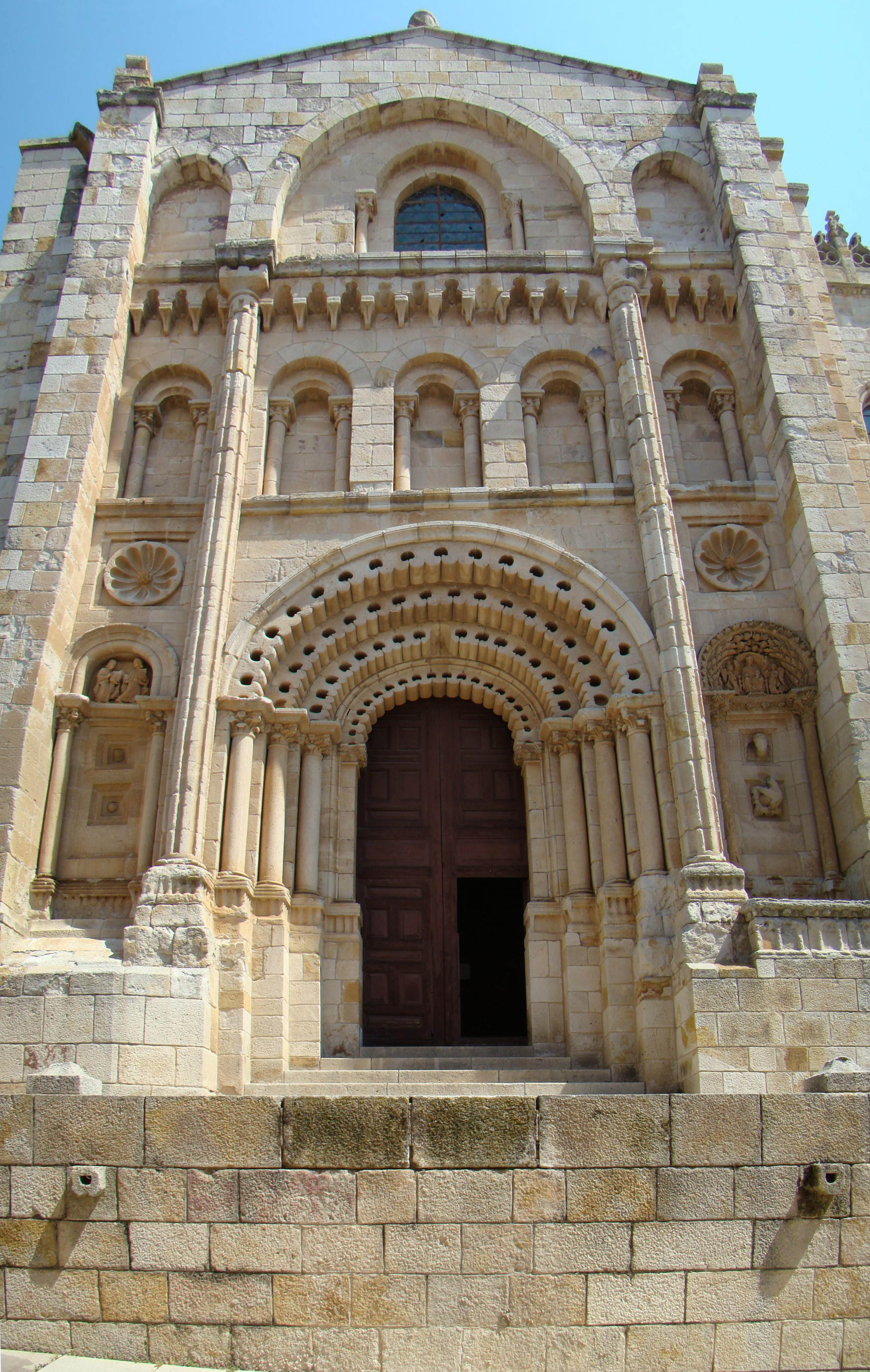
Puerta del Obispo (Bishop's Door).

On the south side of the church, facing the Palacio Episcopal (Bishop's Palace), is the richly sculptured Puerta del Obispo (Bishop's Doorway). It is divided into three vertical sectors, divided by blind columns and topped by semicircular arcades. In the lower sides are lunettes with Romanesque sculptures.

Notable features of the interior include the choir-stalls constructed in 1512–1516 by Juan de Bruselas, carved not only with figures of saints and famous men of antiquity but also with vigorous and earthy scenes of country life. The Capilla Mayor has a marble table, and the high altar is flanked by two Mudéjar pulpits. In the Capilla del Cristo de las Injurias, which is found to the right of the south doorway, is a large figure of Christ by Gaspar Becerra.

The Cathedral contains numerous tombs; particularly notable is the tomb of Grado in the Capilla de San Juan at the east end. The Capilla del Cardenal (named after cardinal Juan de Mella), also at the east end, has an altar by Fernando Gallego, in Gothic-Flemish style (1490–1494).

The bell tower, with a height of 45 m, was built in the 13th century in Romanesque style.

== Cathedral Museum ==
The Cathedral Museum, in the 17th century cloister, is notable particularly for its fine Flemish tapestries of the 15th–17th centuries depicting scenes from the Trojan War, Hannibal's Italian campaign, and the life of Tarquin the Etruscan king of Rome. Another treasure is a Late Gothic monstrance of 1515.

== Other burials ==
- Ponce Giraldo de Cabrera

== See also ==
- High medieval domes

== Bibliography ==
- Hernández Martín, Joaquín (2005). Guía de arquitectura de Zamora. Desde los orígenes al siglo XXI (2nd ed.). Colegio Oficial de Arquitectos de León. ISBN 84-607-9629-9.
