= Castle of Zamora =

Middle Ages fortress in Zamora, Spain

Coordinates: 41.4998°N 5.7561°W

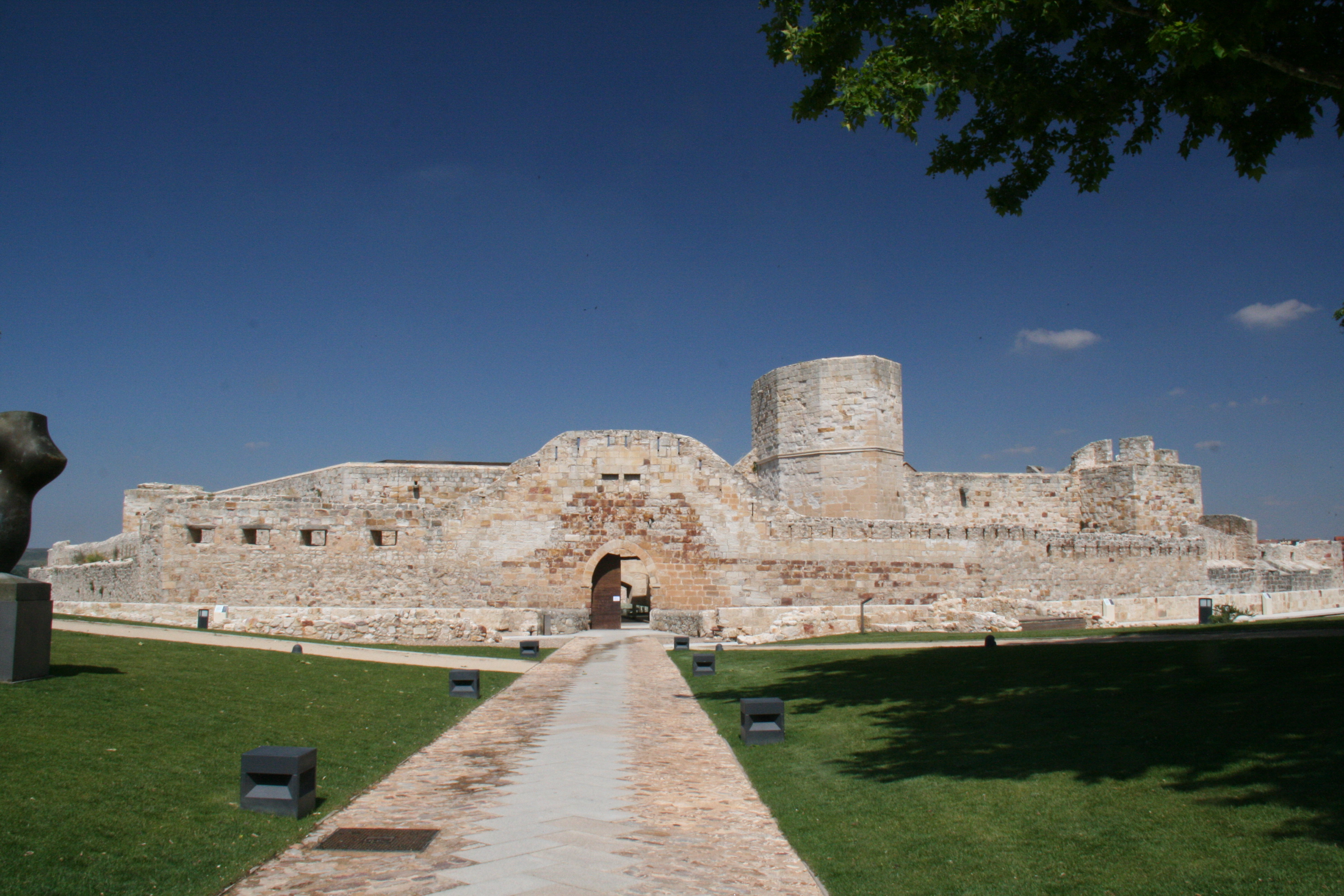
Castle of Zamora

The Castle of Zamora is a Middle Ages fortress in Zamora, Spain. It stands northwest of the city's Cathedral.

It features Pre-Roman foundations and a Romanesque general structure. It was built between the 10th and 12th centuries. It stands northwest of the Cathedral, with views of the town and the river from the keep.
