= Cathedral of Évora =

Roman Catholic church in Évora, Portugal

Sé de Évora Évora Cathedral
- Façade of the Évora Cathedral

Religion
- Affiliation: Roman Catholic
- Diocese: Évora District
- Province: Alentejo
- Ecclesiastical or organisational status: Cathedral

Location
- Location: Évora, Portugal
- Interactive map of Sé de Évora; Évora Cathedral
- Coordinates: 38.5718°N 7.9066°W

Architecture
- Type: Church
- Style: Romanesque, Gothic, Manueline, Baroque
- Groundbreaking: 1186
- Completed: 1746

Website
- Sé de Évora

The Cathedral of Évora (Portuguese: Sé de Évora) is a Roman Catholic church in the city of Évora, Portugal. It is one of the oldest and most important local monuments, lying on the highest spot of the city. It is part of the historical city centre, and the seat of the Archdiocese of Évora.

It was declared a World Heritage Site by UNESCO in 1988.

== History ==
Évora was definitively reconquered from Arab hands in 1166 by Geraldo Sem Pavor (Gerald the Fearless), and soon afterwards the new Christian rulers of the city began to build a cathedral, dedicated to the Virgin Mary. This first building, built between 1186 and 1204, was very modest and was enlarged circa 1280-1340, this time in early Gothic style. The cathedral received several valuable additions through time, such as the Gothic cloisters (14th century), the Manueline chapel of the Esporão (early 16th century) and a new, magnificent main chapel in baroque style (first half of the 18th century). It is the largest of the mediaeval cathedrals in Portugal, and one of its best examples of Gothic architecture.

It is common belief that flags of the fleet of Vasco da Gama, on his first expedition to the Orient, were blessed in the first presbytery of the cathedral in 1497.

The most important historical figure associated with the cathedral was Cardinal-King Henrique (1512–1580), who was archbishop and cardinal of Évora. Cardinal Henrique, who was brother of King John III, had to succeed D. Sebastião as King of Portugal after his death in the Battle of Alcácer-Quibir. The Cardinal-King ruled only between 1578 and 1580.

In the 16th and 17th centuries, the Cathedral of Évora was the setting of the so-called School of Évora of polyphony, which played an important role in the music history of Portugal. Composers related to the Cathedral include Mateus de Aranda and Manuel Mendes and his pupils Duarte Lobo and Filipe de Magalhães.

== Art and architecture ==
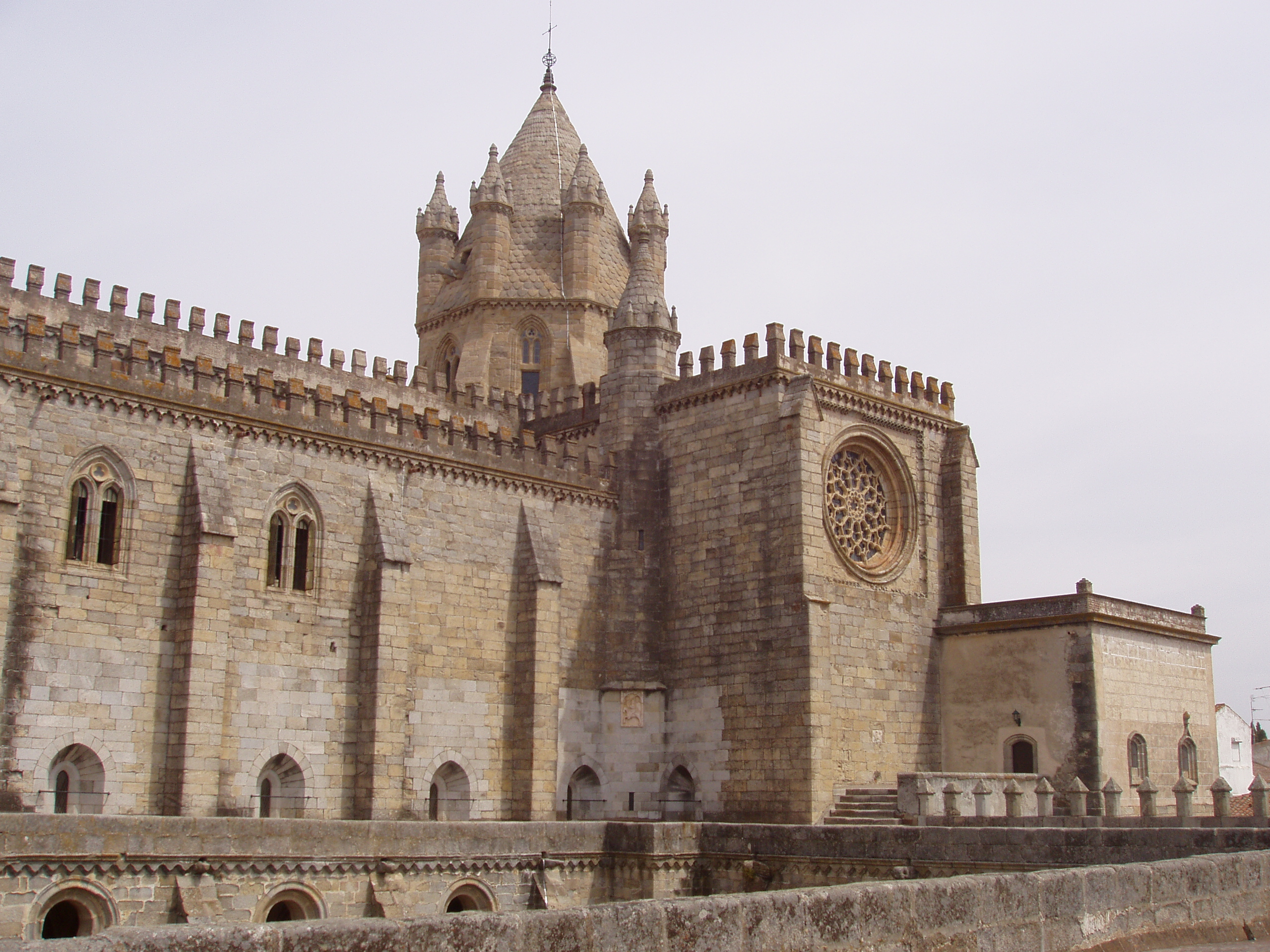
Lateral wall and transept of Évora Cathedral. Note the lantern-tower over the crossing and the rose window of the transept arm.

=== Exterior ===
The main façade of Évora Cathedral, built with rose granite, resembles that of Lisbon Cathedral. Its two massive towers, completed in the 16th century, flank a narthex (entrance gallery) which encloses the main portal.

Over the narthex there is a huge window with Gothic tracery that illuminates the interior. Each tower has a different conical spire, one of them covered with mediaeval coloured tiles. Like other Portuguese churches of the time, the outer walls of Évora Cathedral are decorated with battlements, as well as decorative arcaded corbels.

The lantern tower over the crossing is very picturesque. It has a row of windows that bathe the transept area with light. Its spire, as well as spire of the tower above the crossing of the transept, is surrounded by six turrets, and each turret is a miniature copy of the tower itself. The design of the tower resembles that of other churches in the Duero valley: the Zamora Cathedral and the Torre del Gallo of the Old Cathedral of Salamanca, Santa María in Toro. Miguel Sobrino has proposed the disappeared Romanesque dome over the Cathedral of Santiago de Compostela as the model.

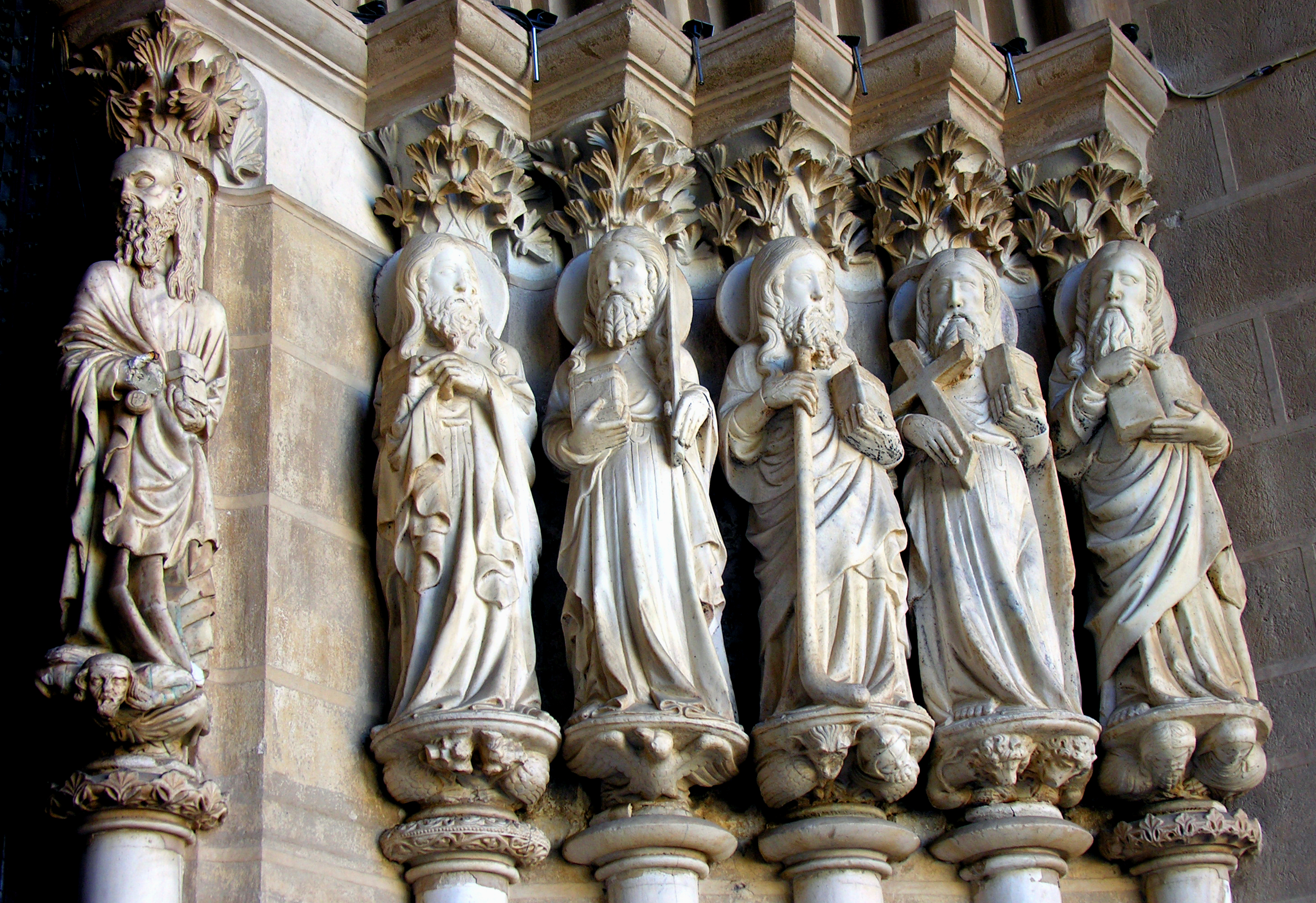
The Gothic Apostles in the main portal of Évora Cathedral

The ogival main portal is a masterpiece of Portuguese Gothic sculpture. The marble columns are occupied by huge statues of the Apostles executed in the 1330s, perhaps by sculptors Master Pero (Mestre Pero) and Telo Garcia. It is the best of its kind in Portugal. Such free-standing Gothic sculptures are rather rare in Portugal. They are usually associated with memorial graves.

=== Interior ===
The Cathedral of Évora, built mainly between 1280 and 1340, was designed following closely the floor plan of Lisbon Cathedral, which had been built in the second half of the 12th century in Romanesque style. Like that church, the builders of Évora Cathedral designed a Latin cross church with a transept, a nave higher than its two aisles, a triforium (arched gallery over the central aisle) and an apse with three chapels. The crossing of the transept is topped by a dome, supported by pendentives, and an octagonal lantern. The transepts are lighted by two Gothic rose windows, one with the morning star and the other with the mystical rose.

The large nave has a pointed barrel vault. The interior space is accentuated by the use of white mortar on the bare high walls, pillars and vaults.

In the entrance, in the first two bays, there is a Manueline high choir by architect Diogo de Arruda (early 16th century), with fine Gothic vaulting. The high choir has Mannerist-style choir stalls carved on oak in 1562 by sculptors from Antwerp. They are decorated with mythological sculptural reliefs and scenes from courtly life, hunting parties and life at the farm. Near the entrance there is also an ancient organ, the oldest still active in Portugal, dated from circa 1544 and executed by Heitor Lobo. On the left side of the entrance stands the small baptistery with a fresco depicting the Baptism of Christ, 18th century azulejos and 16th century Manueline wrought-iron railings.

In the middle of the central nave there is a large Baroque altar with a polychrome Gothic statue of a pregnant Virgin Mary (Nossa Senhora do O) (15th century); facing the Virgin there is a polychrome Renaissance statue of the Archangel Gabriel, attributed to Olivier of Ghent (16th century).

The main chapel was totally rebuilt between 1718 and 1746, a work sponsored by King John V. The architect in charge was João Frederico Ludovice, a German who was royal architect and who had previously designed the Monastery of Mafra. The style favoured by the King and his architect was Roman baroque, with polychrome marble decoration (green marble from Italy, white marble from Montes Claros, red and black marble from Sintra) and painted altars. Although its style does not really fit into the mediaeval interior of the cathedral, the main chapel is nevertheless an elegant baroque masterpiece. The main altar has sculptural decoration by the Italian Antonio Bellini. Portuguese sculptor Manuel Dias is the author of the crucified Jesus over the altar, based on a drawing by Portuguese painter Vieira Lusitano. The painting of the main altar was executed by the Italian Agostino Masucci.

The 13 panels of the original painted Flemish retable of the main chapel can be seen in the Évora Museum. The retable was commissioned around 1500 to a workshop in Bruges by bishop Afonso de Portugal.

The chapel (Capela do Esporão) in the left transept was rebuilt in the 1520s in Manueline style. It now has a beautiful Renaissance marble portal with a marble sculpture by Nicolau Chanterene, Gothic vaulting and a Mannerist altar with the painting "Descent from the Cross" by Francisco Nunes (c.1620). The chapel in the right transept houses the tomb of the humanist André de Resende (16th century). In these chapels are also buried João Mendes de Vasconcelos, Governor of Luanda during the reign of Manuel I, and of Álvaro da Costa, ambassador and armorer of King Manuel.

== Cloisters ==
The cloisters of the cathedral were built between 1317 and 1340 in Gothic style, and again shows the influence of the cloisters of Lisbon Cathedral. Despite the use of Late-Gothic tracery, the use of granite in its construction gives it a heavy-looking overall impression.

Each corner of the cloister gallery has a marble Gothic statue of one of the Four Evangelists. The Capela do Fundador, the funerary chapel of bishop D. Pedro, builder of the cloisters, features his tomb with recumbent figure, a statue of the Archangel Gabriel and a polychromed statue of Mary. The upper storey of the cloisters, reachable via a spiral staircase, offers a grand view of the cathedral and the surrounding landscape.

== Cathedral Museum ==
Exhibits in the cathedral museum include:

- the sceptre of Cardinal-King Henrique, a 16th-century goldsmith work in Manueline style
- a puzzle-like, 12-inch-high Gothic ivory statue of Mary, whose midriff opens up into a triptych with nine scenes of her life – a French work of art from the 13th century. The head of the statue is a replica from the 16th century.
- the 17th-century reliquary of Santo Lenho (holy wood), supposedly containing pieces of Christ's Cross, of gilded silver and polychromed enamel, encrusted with 1426 true gems (840 diamonds, 402 rubies, 180 emeralds, two sapphires, one hyacinth and one cameo).
- a collection of canonicals from the 17th and the 18th centuries.

Some paintings in the collection are worthwhile, especially those by Gregório Lopes, Cristóvão de Figueiredo and Garcia Fernandes.

== Gallery ==
Gothic main portal with sculptures of the Twelve Apostles

Rose window

Crossing tower viewed from the cathedral roof

Nave looking toward the main chapel

Main chapel and high altar

Side chapel

Renaissance organ

Gilded altarpiece with a statue of the Virgin Mary

Upper choir

Cloister viewed from roof

Rib vaults in cloister

Tomb in the Chapel of Bishop D. Pedro, with a recumbent effigy and lion supports

== See also ==
- High medieval domes
