= Estêvão de Brito =

Portuguese composer of polyphony

Estêvão de Brito (c. 1570–1641) was a Portuguese composer of polyphony.

== Life ==
Estêvão de Brito was born in Serpa, Portugal. He studied music at the Cathedral of Évora with Filipe de Magalhães. In January 1597 he was already mestre de capela of the Cathedral of Badajoz (Spain), where he stayed until 1613. In that year, he went to the cathedral of Málaga and succeeded Francisco Vásquez bearing the same office as Cristóbal de Morales, precisely 50 years before. He stayed in Málaga until his death in 1641.

== Work ==
It is known that de Brito composed numerous villancicos and cançonetas, most of them for the Christian feasts of Christmas and Corpus Christi. Unfortunately, these works were lost due to the devastation of the 1755 Lisbon earthquake. However, the most relevant in de Brito's work are the liturgic pieces: 4-, 5-, 6-, and 8-voice masses, motets, psalms, and hymns.

== Recordings ==
- 1993, Portuguese Renaissance Music, Voces Angelicae, Teldec Classics International 4509-93690-2
  - includes 5 works by de Brito.
- 1991, Lamentations, Oxford Camerata, Jeremy Summerly, Naxos - Early Music
  - Lamentations of Jeremiah by White, Tallis, Lassus and Estêvão de Brito
