= Heliodoro de Paiva =

Portuguese composer, philosopher, and theologian

Dom Heliodoro de Paiva (fl. Coimbra, 1552) was a Portuguese composer, philosopher, and theologian.

== Life ==
Heliodoro de Paiva was born in Lisbon (date unknown). He studied at the Monastery of Santa Cruz de Coimbra, where he took the holy orders as an Augustinian regular capitulary. He was remarkable for the qualities he revealed in a wide variety of subjects: apart from musician and composer, he was well versed in the Greek, Latin, and Hebraic languages, and he was a good philosopher and theologian. As a musician, he played several instruments with skill and he was an esteemed singer.

== Work ==
Paiva's work can be found in the music manuscripts of the Monastery of Santa Cruz de Coimbra (now kept at the library of the University of Coimbra). He composed masses, motets, and Magnificats but, as he was excessively humble, he did not sign his works, which makes it more difficult to identify them.

== Bibliography ==
- Bernardes, J. M. R. e Bernardes, I. R. S. (2003), Uma Discografia de Cds da Composição Musical em Portugal: Do Século XIII aos Nossos Dias, INCM. [pp. 197–198].
- Cruz, António e Pimentel, Carlos F. (1937), Inventário dos Inéditos e Impressos Musicais: Subsídios para um Catálogo, prefácio de M. S. Kastner, Coimbra.
- Faria, Francisco (1974), “O estilo concertante em Coimbra”, Separata da revista Bracara Augusta, vol. XXVIII, Fasc. 65-66 (77-78), Braga, Livraria da Cruz.
- Faria, Francisco (1980), “Algumas notas sobre os Manuscritos Musicais da Biblioteca Geral da Universidade de Coimbra”, Coimbra, Separata do Boletim da Biblioteca da Universidade de Coimbra, vol. XXXIV, 3ª Parte.
- Faria, Francisco (1982), “A Música em Coimbra no Século XVI”, A Sociedade e a Cultura em Coimbra no Renascimento, Coimbra, Epartur, pp. 239–256.
- Faria, Francisco (1984), “O canto em Santa Cruz de Coimbra”, in Cruz, António (coord.), Santa Cruz de Coimbra: Do Séc. XI ao Séc. XX, Coimbra, pp. 209–214.
- Kastner, Macario Santiago (1950), “Los manuscritos musicales n.º 48 y 242 de la Biblioteca General de la Universidad de Coimbra”, Anuário Musical, Barcelona, CSIC, vol. V, pp. 78–96.
- Machado, Diogo Barbosa (1965-1967), Biblioteca Lusitana, 4 volumes, Coimbra, Atlântida Editora.
- Mazza, José (1944-1945), Dicionário Biográfico de Músicos Portugueses, ed. e notas de José Augusto Alegria, Ocidente, Lisboa, Tipografia da Editorial Império.
- Nery, Rui Vieira (1984), A Música no Ciclo da Bibliotheca Lusitana, Lisboa, Fundação Calouste Gulbenkian, pp. 183–184.
- Pinho, Ernesto Gonçalves de (1981), Santa Cruz de Coimbra: Centro de Actividade Musical nos Sécs. XVI e XVII, Lisboa, Fundação Calouste Gulbenkian.
- Rees, Owen (1995), Polyphony in Portugal c. 1530-1620: Sources from the Monastery of Santa Cruz, Coimbra, New York and London, Garland Publishing.
- Rees, Owen (2001), “Paiva, Heliodoro de”, The New Grove Dictionary of Music and Musicians, 2ª Edição.
- Ribeiro, Mário de Sampaio (1939), A Música em Coimbra, Separata de Biblos, Vol. XV, Coimbra, Coimbra Universidade.
- Ribeiro, Mário de Sampaio (1940), “Os Manuscritos Musicais de Coimbra e a sua Catalogação”, Lisboa, Ocidente, vol. XI, nº 31, pp. 137–138.
- Ribeiro, Mário de Sampaio (1941), Os MM n.º 6 e 12 da BGUC: Contribuição para um Catálogo Definitivo, Coimbra, Imprensa da Universidade.
- Valença, Manuel (1990), A Arte Organística em Portugal: c. 1326–1750, volume I, Braga, Província Portuguesa da Ordem Franciscana, pp. 106–107.
- Vasconcelos, Joaquim de (1870), Os Músicos Portuguezes: Biografia, Bibliografia, 2 volumes, Porto, Imprensa Portugueza.
- Vieira, Ernesto (2007/1900), Diccionario Biographico de Musicos Portuguezes, Lisboa, Lambertini, Edição Facsimilada de Arquimedes Livros.
