= Luis de Morales =

16th-century Spanish painter

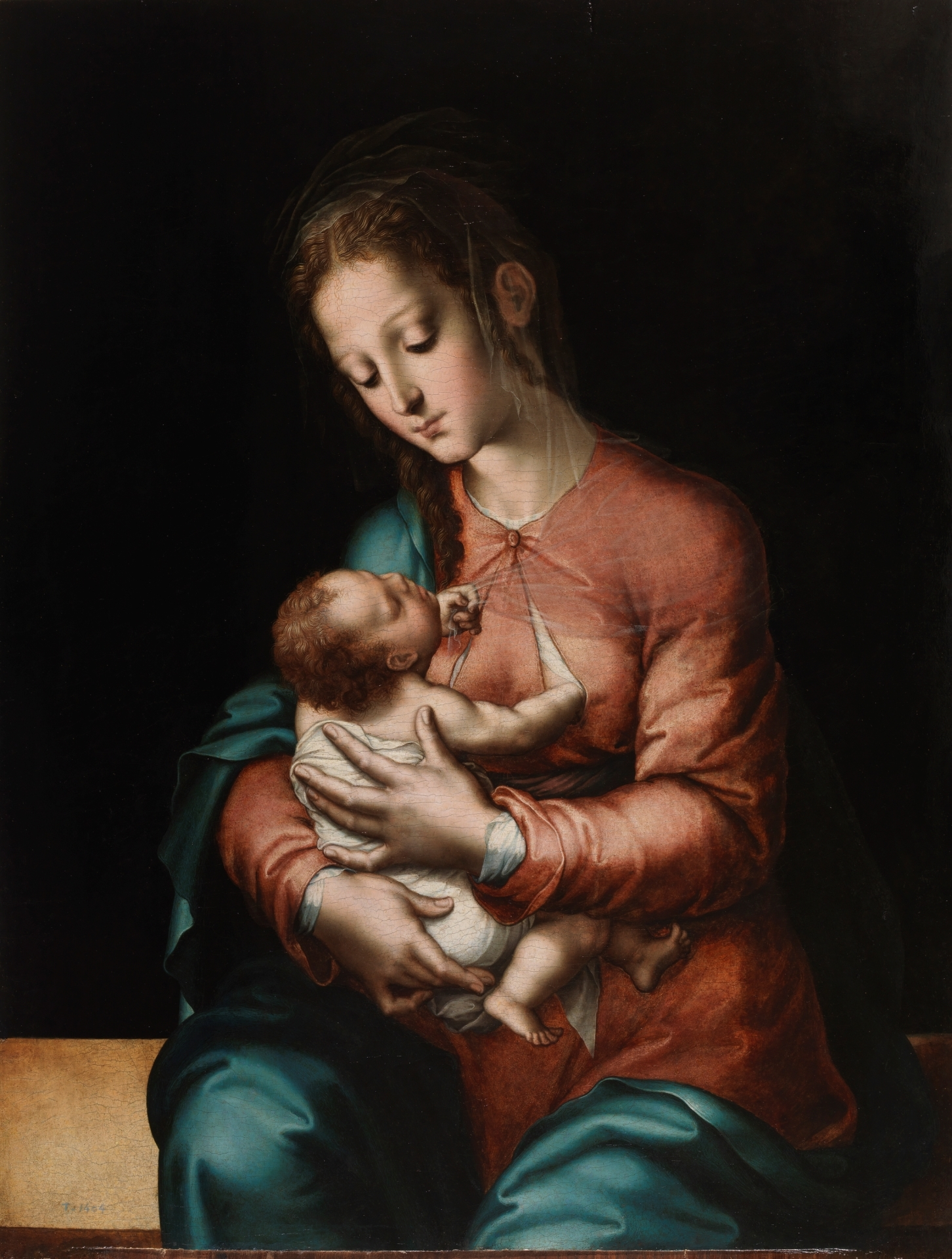
Madonna and Child by Luis de Morales, Prado Museum

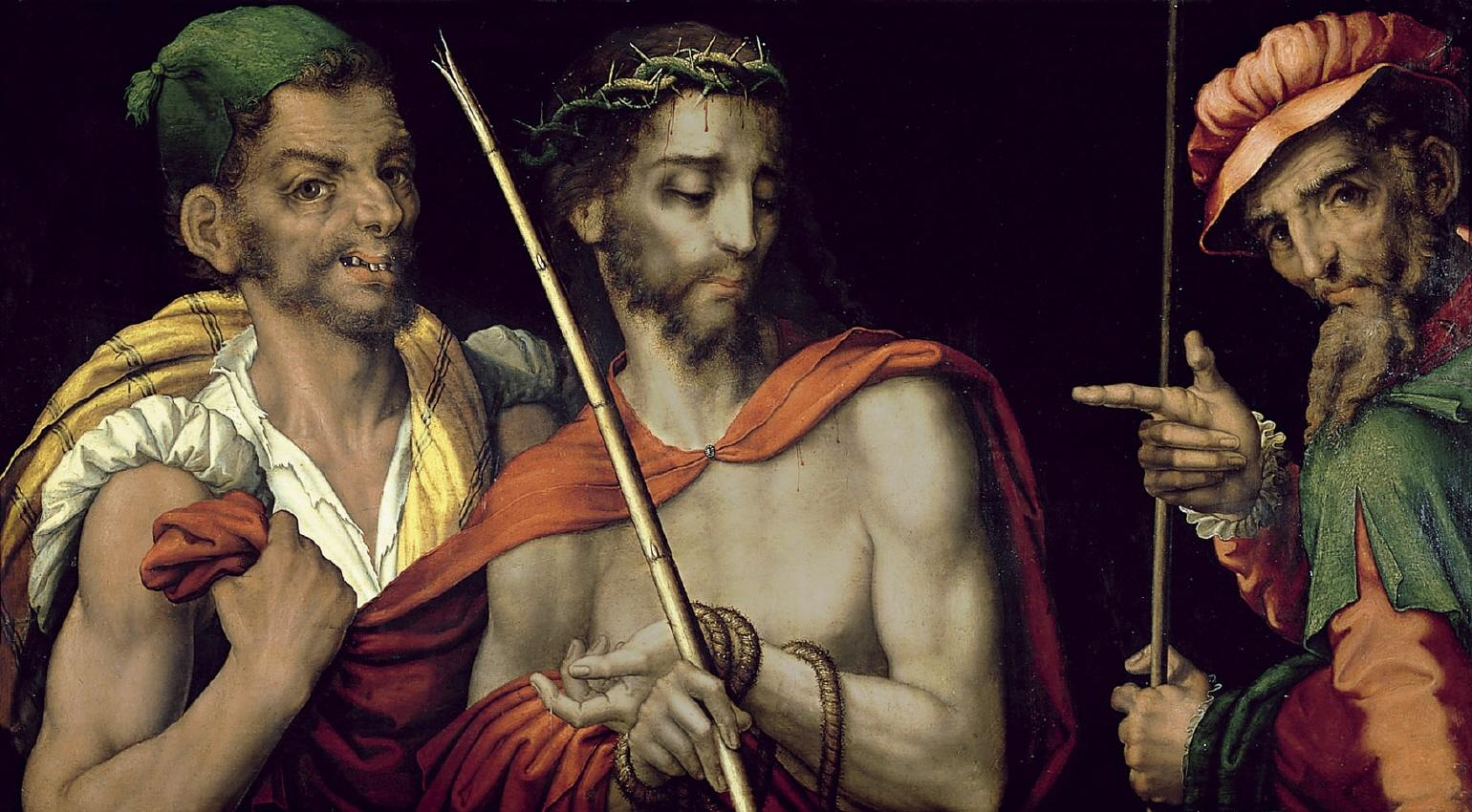
Christ before Pilate, Real Academia de Bellas Artes de San Fernando, Madrid

Luis de Morales (1509 – 9 May 1586) was a Spanish painter active during the Spanish Renaissance in the 16th century. Known as "El Divino", most of his work was of religious subjects, including many representations of the Madonna and Child and the Passion.

Influenced by Raphael Sanzio and the Lombard school of Leonardo da Vinci, especially in his early work, he was called by his contemporaries "The Divine Morales" because of his skill and the shocking realism of his paintings, and because of the spirituality transmitted by all his work.

His work has been divided by critics into two periods, an early stage marked by the influence of Florentine artists such as Michelangelo, and a more intense, more anatomically correct later stage with similarities to the works of German and Flemish Renaissance painters. The Prado Museum in Madrid holds around 22 paintings by Morales. Some of his works can also be seen at Salamanca's Cathedral and Museum in Plasencia and the Real Academia de Bellas Artes de San Fernando in Madrid.

== Selected works ==
- La Virgen del Pajarito (Virgin of the Bird) (1546), kept in the church of San Agustín, in Madrid.
- La Piedad (Pietà) (1560), kept in Badajoz Cathedral.
- San Juan de Ribera (1564), in the Prado Museum, Madrid.
- Ecce Homo, in the Hispanic Society of America.
- La Piedad (Pietà), in the Prado Museum, Madrid.
- Virgen de la leche (Breastfeeding Virgin), in the Prado Museum.
- St. Jerome in the Wilderness, in the National Gallery of Ireland, Dublin.
- Christ tied to a Column, at Kingston Lacy House (National Trust), Dorset U.K.
- Madonna della Purità, in the Basilica of San Paolo Maggiore, Naples, Italy.
- La Piedad (Pietà), Real Academia de Bellas Artes de San Fernando, Madrid.
- Christ before Pilate, Real Academia de Bellas Artes de San Fernando, Madrid.
- Virgin and Child with the infant St. John the Baptist, Salamanca's Cathedral.
- Lamentation of the Christ, Museo de Salamanca.
