= Antonio Abreu =

Portuguese guitarist and composer

Antonio Abreu (c. 1750 – c. 1820) was a Portuguese guitarist and composer.

== Biography ==
Antonio Abreu was born in c. 1750. He was either born in Portugal, or was of Portuguese descent.

Abreu's method for six-course guitar, Escuela para tocar con perfección la guitarra de cinco y seis órdenes con reglas generales de mano izquierda y derecha, was published in Salamanca in 1799; a book which included music that he composed and which outlined rules for playing that he designed. The Spanish monk Víctor Prieto was responsible for getting this manuscript ready for publications; serving as its editor as well as adding a few chapters of his own to the text. Prieto was the organist at Convento de San Esteban, Salamanca, and had discovered Abreu's manuscript. His added text included a historical view of the aesthetics of music and the origins of the guitar.

Abreu died in c. 1820.
