= Mestre da Capela Real =

Mestre da Capela Real (Master of the Royal Chapel) was the Portuguese term used to designate the person who was in charge of all musical details related with the churches and chapels of the Kings of Portugal.

On 27 of March 1623 Filipe de Magalhães was appointed Mestre da Capela Real, a position he held until his retirement in 1641. Marcos Soares Pereira was then appointed to the position, which he held until his death in 1655.
