= Manuel Correia (composer) =

Frei Manuel Correia (or Correa) (ca. 1600 – 1653) was a Portuguese Baroque composer.

He was born in Lisbon, the son of an instrumentalist in the ducal capela at Vila Viçosa, Portugal. He followed his father into this establishment as a singer in 1616. He studied with Filipe de Magalhães, then emigrated to Madrid, Spain. He was then tempted away from the city by appointments which took him to the cathedral of Sigüenza and then to Saragossa, where he stayed until his death in 1653. He composed many motets, tonos humanos and villancicos, present in the songbook El libro de tonos humanos (1655) and in the cathedral of Valladolid.
