= Collegiate church of Santa María la Mayor (Toro) =

Church in Toro, Zamora, Spain

Coordinates: 41°31′12″N 5°23′40″W

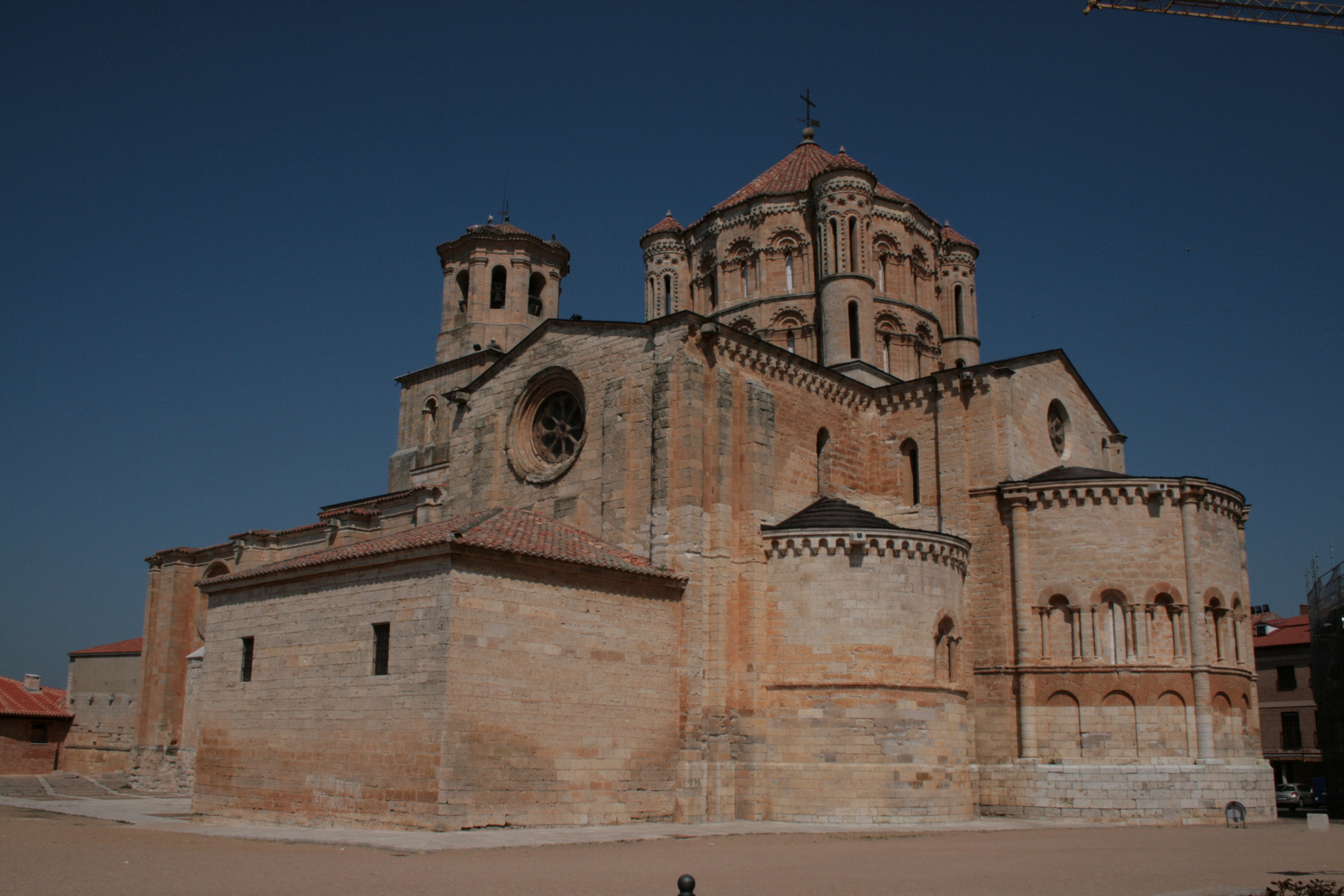
Collegiate church of Toro.

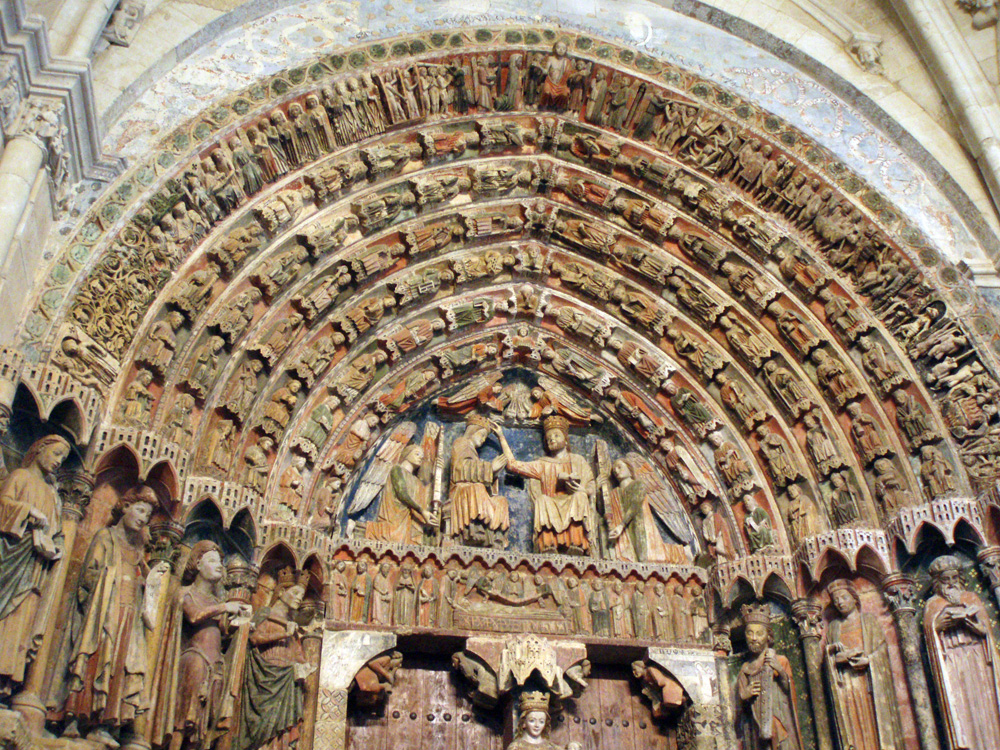
Pórtico de la Majestad.

The Collegiate church of Santa María la Mayor is a medieval church in Toro, province of Zamora, Spain. It is dedicated to Saint Mary the Great (a Marian devotion, it is a common name for churches and sites).

== Construction ==
One of the most characteristic examples of transitional Romanesque architecture in Spain, the church of Santa María la Mayor is inspired by the Cathedral of Zamora, in turn, inspired by the Old Cathedral of Salamanca. The tower-dome is usually listed as one of the four most typical in León together with those in the cathedrals of Salamanca, Plasencia and Zamora.

It was begun around 1170 and was finished in the mid-13th century. Two different directors of the work have been identified, according to the different types of stone used (limestone in the old sections, sandstone in the most recent ones), and by the barrel vaults in the transept. The church is on the basilica plan, with a nave and two aisles, with a transept over whose crossing is the hendecagonal dome. The transept ends with three semicircular apses.

Notable is the Majesty Portico (Pórtico de la Majestad), which houses the southern entrance. It was built in the reign of Sancho IV of Castile and León (1284–1295) and is decorated with polychrome sculptures depicting scenes of the life of the Virgin, Christ, and the Final Judgement.

== Interior ==
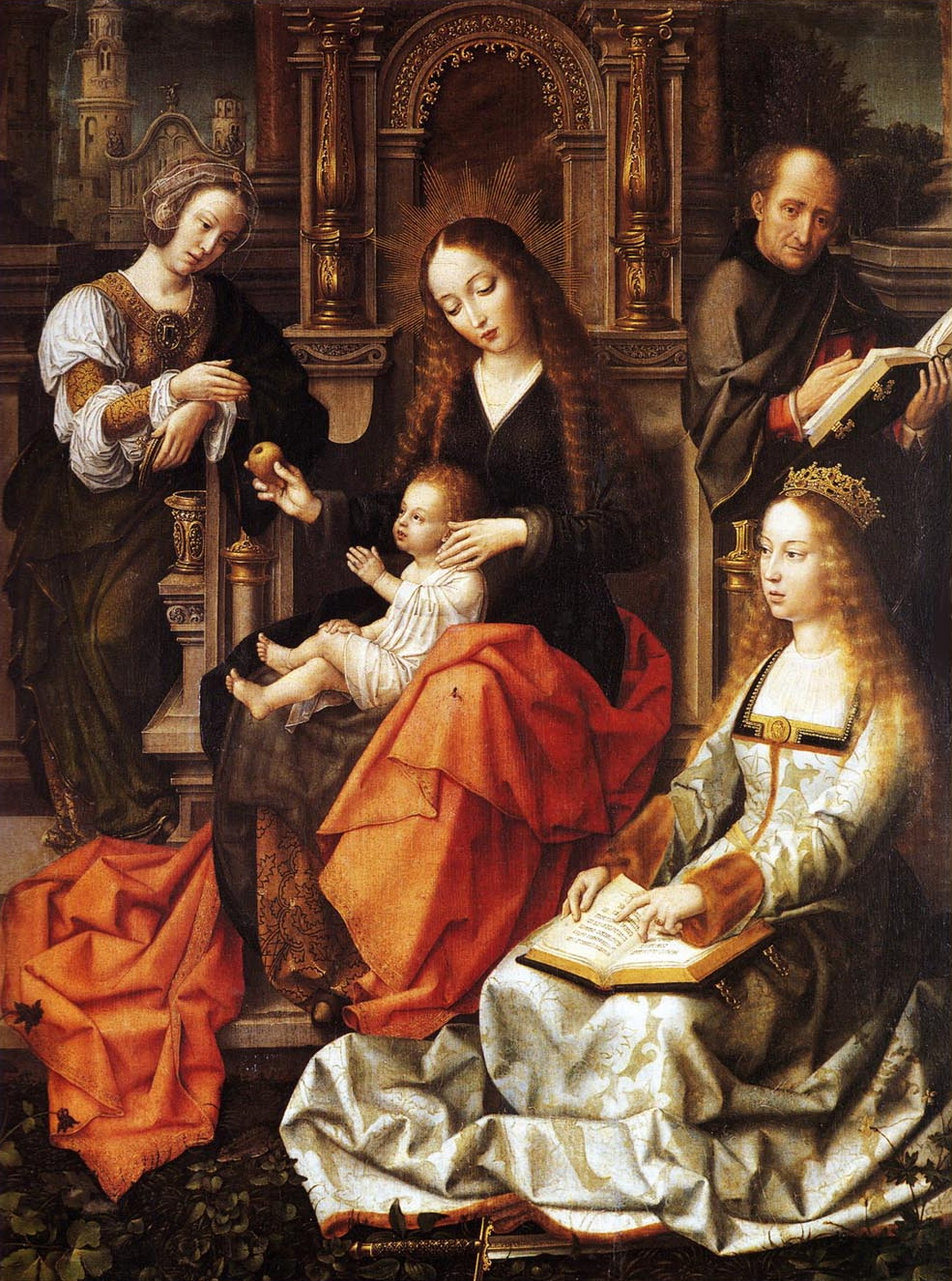
Virgin of the Fly

Also in the church are the Flemish painting La Virgen de la Mosca ("Virgin of the Fly") and an unusual sculpture of a Pregnant Virgin, dating to the 13th century. The painting of the Virgin of the Fly is especially unusual because of the realistic portrayal of a fly on the tunic which covers the Virgin's knee. Studies of the work demonstrate that this insect was added later. These same studies have pointed out numerous touchings-up in the original painting, such as the halo that surrounds the head of the Virgin, previously covered by a veil, or the rich embroidery on the dress of Saint Catherine of Alexandria, whose face has a great resemblance to some paintings of Isabella I of Castile.

== See also ==
- High medieval domes
