= Filipe de Magalhães =

Portuguese composer

Filipe de Magalhães (c. 1571–1652) was a Portuguese composer of sacred polyphony.

== Life ==
Filipe de Magalhães was born in Azeitão, Portugal, around 1571. He studied music at the Cathedral of Évora in southern Portugal with Manuel Mendes; there he was a colleague of the equally renowned polyphonists Duarte Lobo and Manuel Cardoso. He was apparently considered by his master Manuel Mendes as his favourite student; the latter left his own manuscripts to Magalhães, in the hope that these would be eventually published.

In 1589 Magalhães replaced Manuel Mendes as mestre do Claustro da Sé. Later, he went to Lisbon to become a member of the Capela Real (Royal Chapel's) choir and then mestre de Capela da Misericórdia. On the 27th of March 1623 he was appointed Mestre da Capela Real, a position he held until 1641.

While at Évora, he was the teacher of Estêvão Lopes Morago, Estêvão de Brito and Manuel Correia, who carried on with the music school of the Cathedral of Évora in the 16th and 17th centuries. He died in Lisbon.

== Musical work ==
Magalhães dedicated himself to the composition of sacred polyphonic works for the liturgy. Most of them were published in collections such as the Missarum Liber, which was dedicated to Philip II of Portugal, and the Cantica Beatissima Virgines, published in Lisbon in 1639. He also wrote a book of plainsong, Cantus Ecclesiasticus, which was published in five different editions (the first ones in Lisbon in 1614 and in Antwerp in 1642, and the last one in 1724).

The catalogue of the Music Library of King John IV of Portugal also mentions one 8-voice Mass, 6-voice Lamentations for Maundy Thursday, one 7-voice Christmas villancico and five 5- and 6-voice motets. All these works are believed to have been lost during the 1755 Lisbon earthquake.

== Source ==
- Évora Distrito Digital, Duarte Lobo e Filipe de Magalhães (in Portuguese)
