= New Cathedral of Plasencia =

Cathedral in Plasencia, Spain

Coordinates: 40.0280°N 6.0907°W

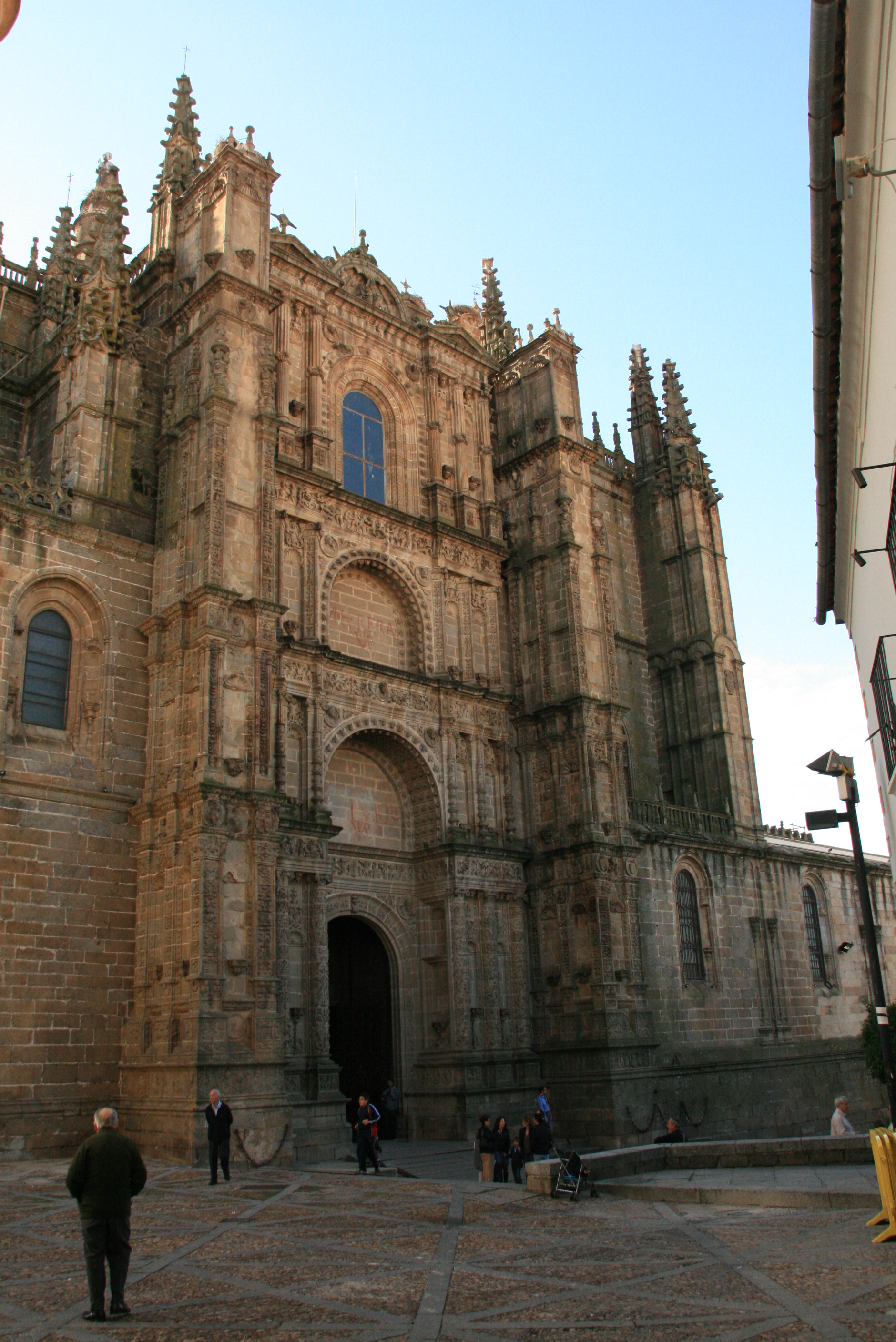
The New Cathedral of Plasencia

New Cathedral of Plasencia or Catedral de Asunción de Nuestra Señora is a Roman Catholic cathedral located in the town of Plasencia, Region of Extremadura, Spain. It is dedicated to the Virgin Mary.

== History ==
The cathedral consists of two buildings: the old (Catedral Vieja), dedicated to Saint Paul, and the new (Catedral Nueva). Construction began in the 13th-century in a mostly Romanesque style. The 15th-century new church was built in Gothic architectural style with high ceilings. The main retablo was built in the 17th century, carved by Gregorio Fernández and painted by Francisco Ricci. The choirs are delicately carved. The old church now houses the Cathedral museum.

== Gallery ==
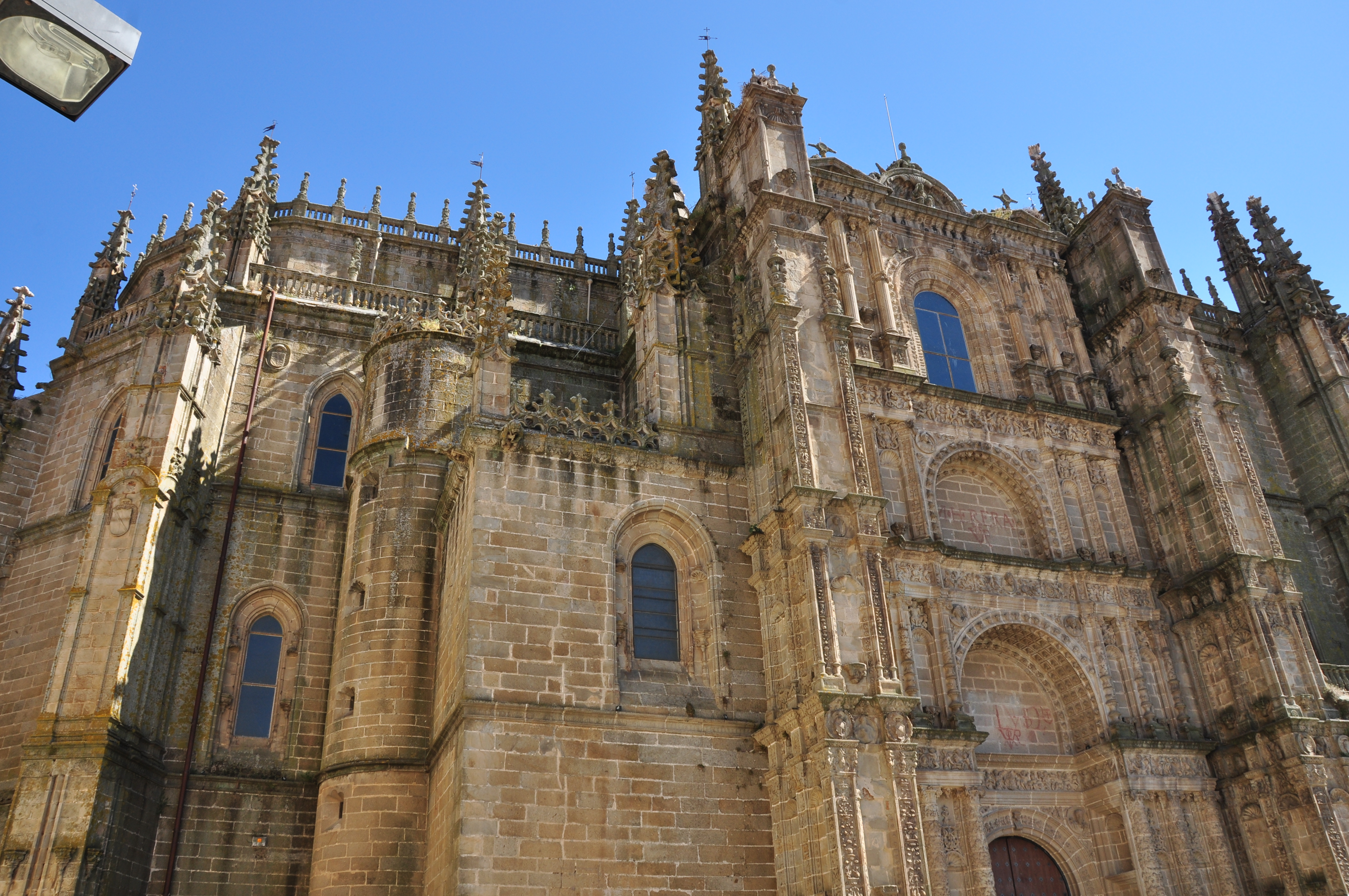
Top of the facade.

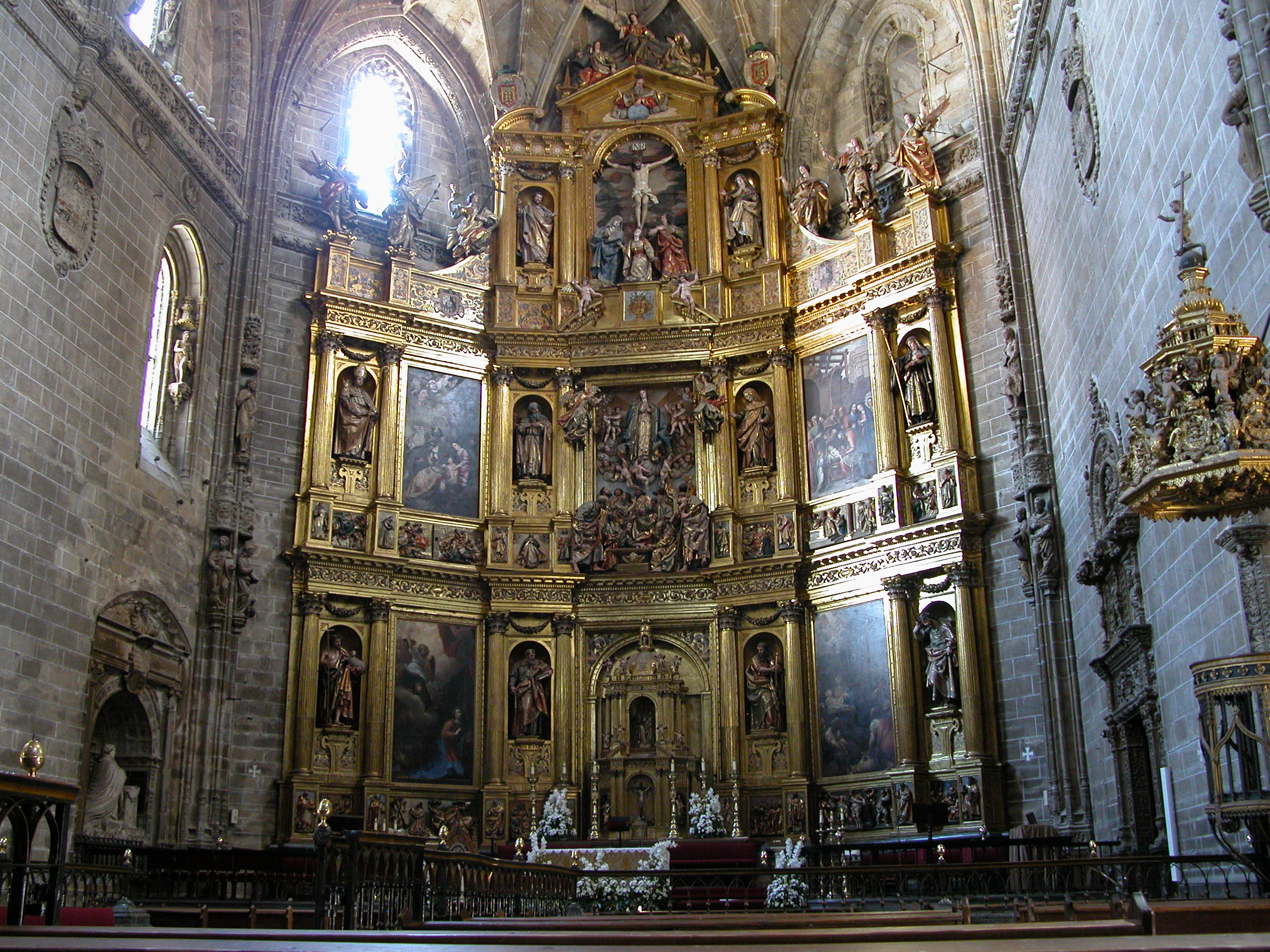
The altarpiece, a Baroque work of the 17th century.

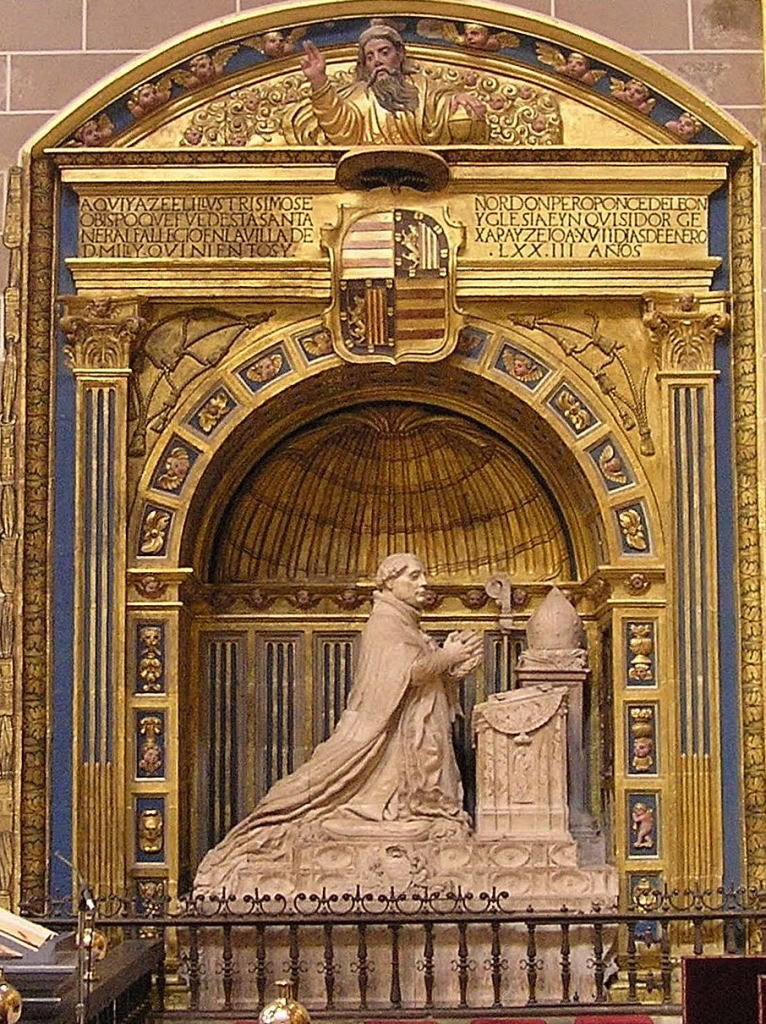
Tomb of Bishop Pedro Ponce de León.

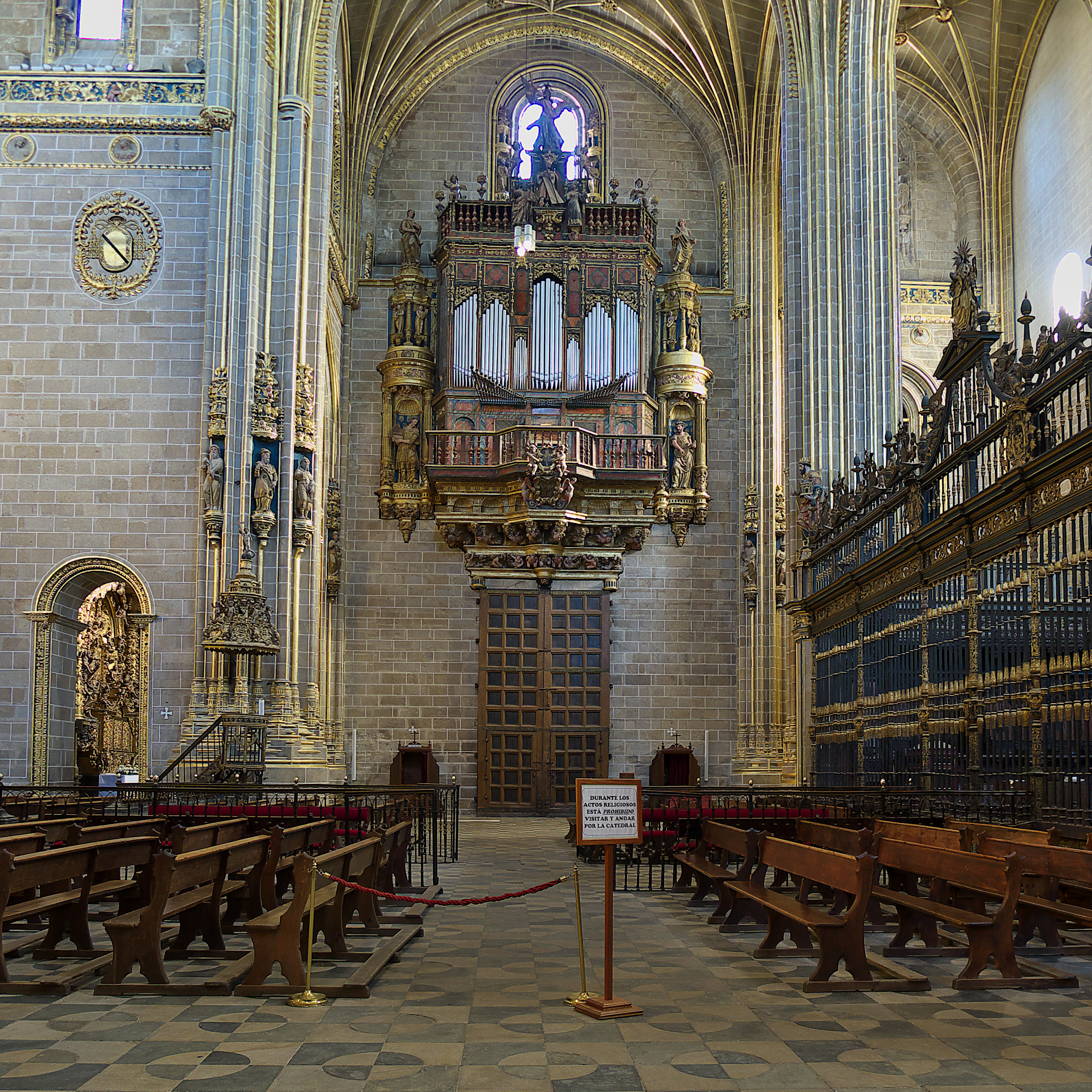
The Large Organ, work by Friar Domingo de Aguirre.
