= Pedro Gómez Gudiel =

Pedro Gómez Gudiel y Barroso was a Castilian nobleman and religious leader who held the ecclesiastical dignity of Bishop of Segovia in the 14th century.

Born in Toledo, he was the son of Fernando Díaz Gudiel, La Torre de Esteban Hambrán, and his wife Urraca Pérez Barroso, of the lordships of Malpica de Tajo, later Marquisate of Malpica.

Appointed as Bishop of Segovia on 13 February 1352, a year later he was present at the marriage celebrated in the city of Tello de Castilla, the illegitimate son of Alfonso XI of Castile by Eleanor de Guzmán, with Juana de Lara, Lordship of Biscay. The marriage was also attended by King Peter of Castile, the bridegroom's half-brother, who shortly afterward ordered the bishop to accompany Queen Blanche of Bourbon, whom he had ordered to be imprisoned in the Castle of Arévalo. Gómez Gudiel initially refused, but the king ordered him again to accompany the queen, this time from Arévalo to the Alcázar of Toledo. This is the last known record of the bishop, whose mandate ended unknown.

Catholic Church titles
Preceded by Blasco of Portugal	Bishop of Segovia; 1353–13..	Succeeded by Gonzalo II
