= Old Cathedral of Salamanca =

Catholic church in Spain

Coordinates: 40°57′37.7″N 5°40′0″W

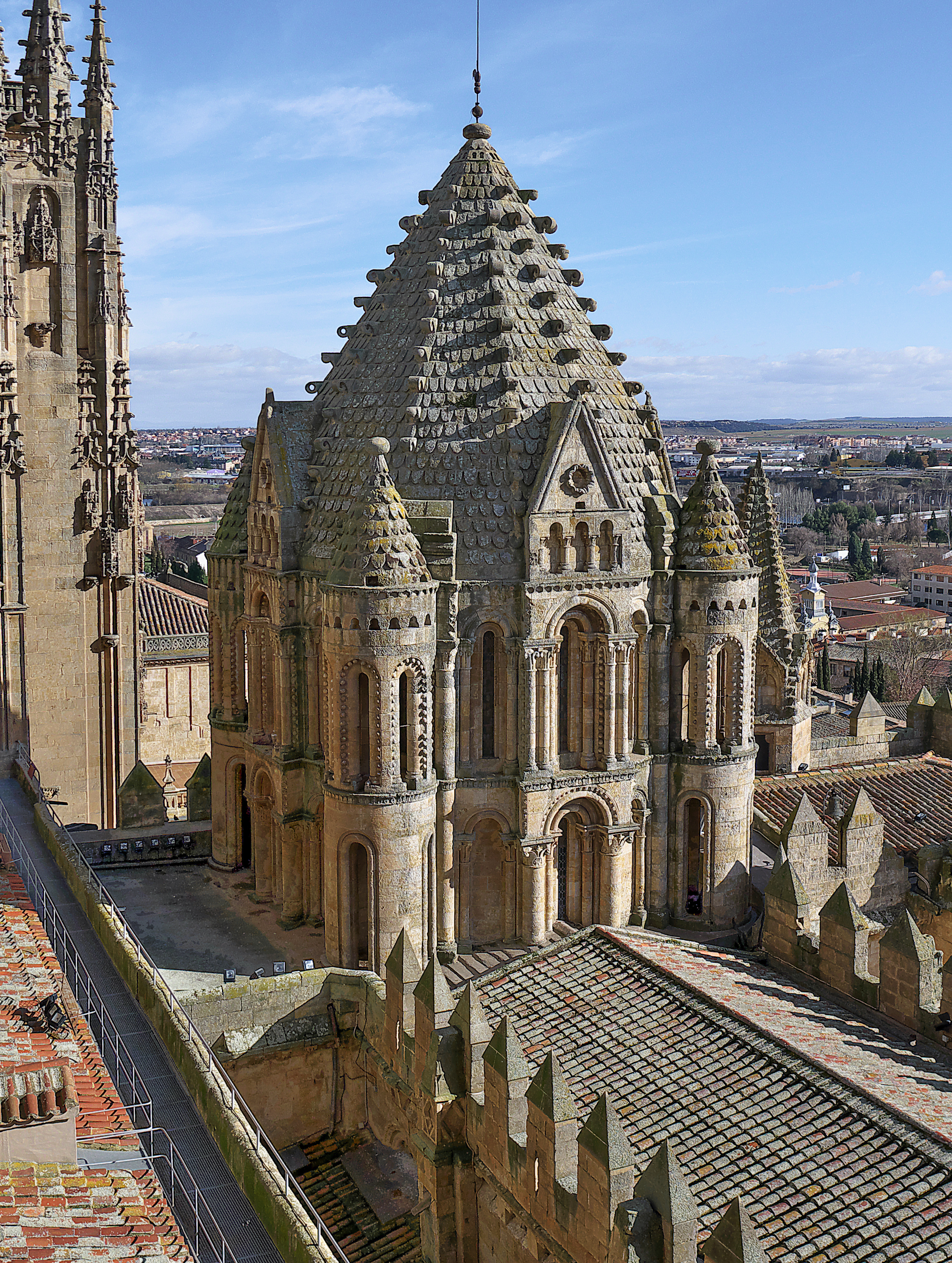
Crossing tower of the Old Cathedral

The Cathedral of Santa María (Spanish: Catedral Vieja de Santa María), known as the Old Cathedral, is one of the two cathedrals in Salamanca, Castile and León, Spain. Founded by Bishop Jerome of Périgord, its construction began in the first third of the 12th century and was finished at the end of the 14th century, in Romanesque and Gothic style. It was finished thanks to the impulse given to the works by Bishop Alfonso Barasaque. It is dedicated to Saint Mary of the See (Santa María de la Sede).

== Characteristics ==
It began to be built on the initiative of its first bishop, Jerome of Périgord (died in 1120) after the restoration of the diocese of Salamanca by King Alfonso VI of León, and after the repopulation of the city carried out by his son-in-law Raymond of Burgundy. This was a period in which Romanesque was giving way to Gothic, something that can be seen in the difference between the pillars and the starts of the ribbed vaults, since there is no constructive continuity between them, as the former were designed to support a barrel vault, and the cathedral was completed in 1236.

It was on the verge of being destroyed in the early modern period, since when the New Cathedral was planned, it was going to be demolished, but the long period of time that elapsed between the beginning of the works of the New Cathedral (around 1520) and the late date of completion (around 1733), as well as the need for a space to celebrate the Mass while construction was being finished, meant that the initial decision to demolish it was abandoned. The left nave appears narrower and part of the transept arm is missing, as a consequence of the construction of the New Cathedral.

It is a basilica-shaped building, with a Latin cross and three naves, a marked transept and a chevet formed by three semicircular apses, which show windows with semicircular arches on the exterior. Given the frontier character of Salamanca, it was also designed as a fortress, a quality now not so visible, since the battlements of the Mocha Tower have disappeared and the roof of the nave, formerly a walkable terrace, has been replaced by another of Spanish tile. For this reason it was popularly known as fortis salmantina. (Note: In the 15th century an adage was spread extolling the four Spanish cathedrals that were considered with more greatness, which says: Sancta Ovetensis, pulchra Leonina, dives Toledana, fortis Salmantina)

The works began to be carried out by the apse, that is why this would be the oldest part, being able to contemplate the change of style in the vaults that cover the naves, since they were projected groin vaults and were replaced by ribbed vaults.

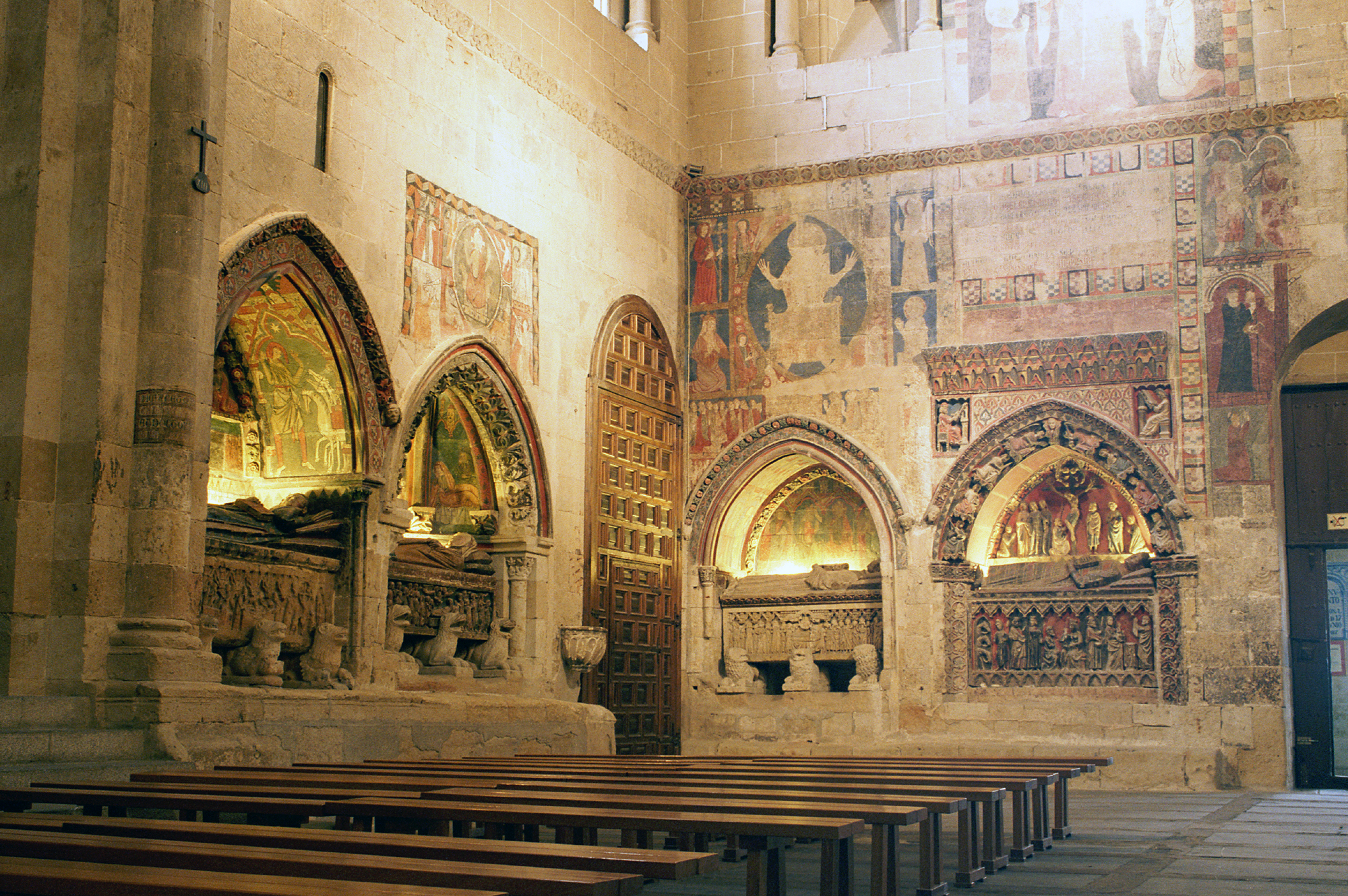
Sepulchers of the south arm of the transept of the Old Cathedral of Salamanca

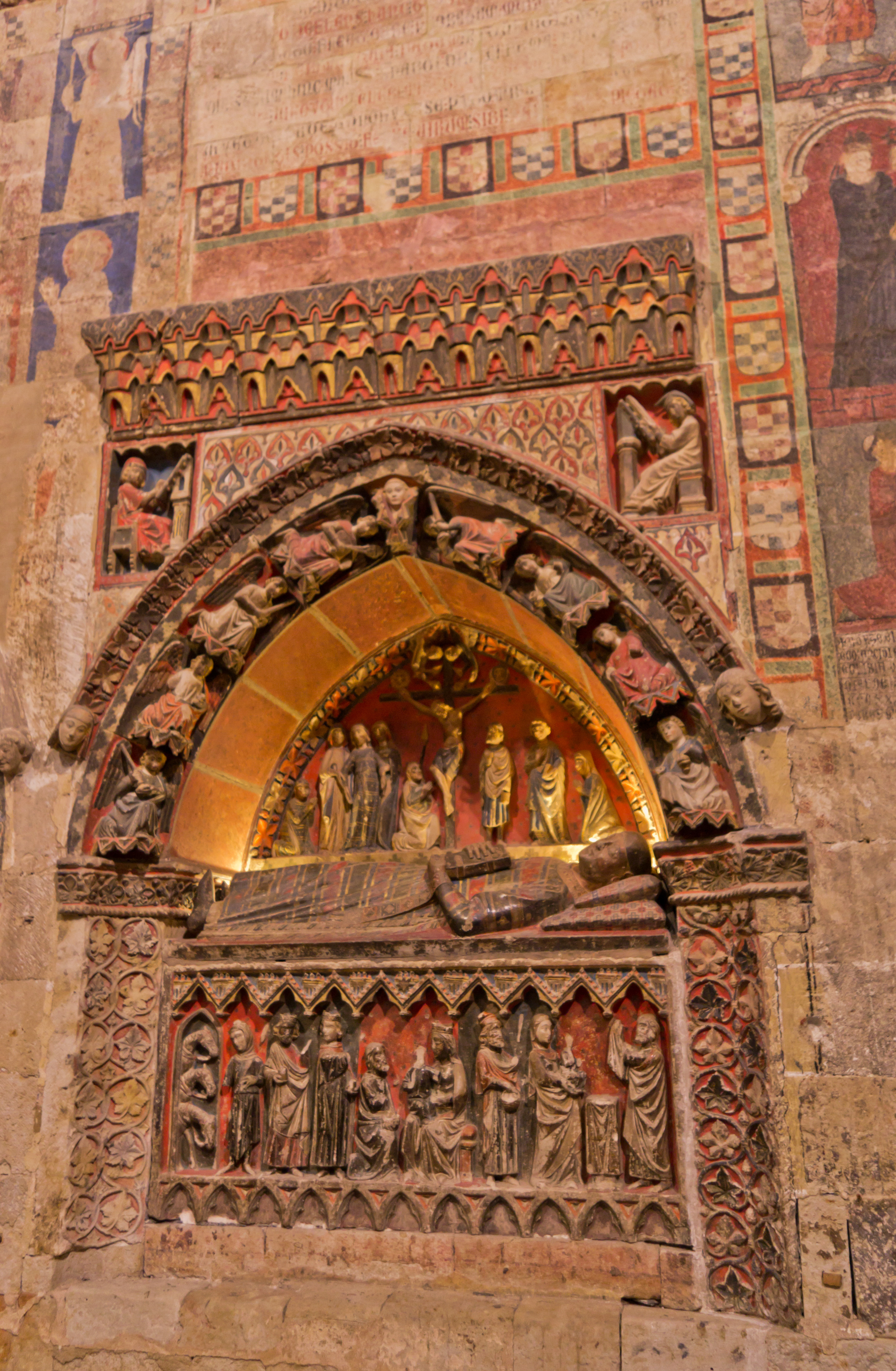
Sepulcher of the south arm of the transept

The most outstanding element of the monument is the considerable dome that rises over the transept supported by four impressive pendentives, and whose date of construction should be placed around 1150. On the inside it is shaped like an open orange with sixteen segments, while on the outside it is almost conical in shape, decorated with scales, and is popularly known as the "Torre del Gallo" (Tower of the Rooster), since this animal appears on the weathervane that crowns it. It rests on a drum with sixteen columns in the interior, lightened by 32 windows, 16 nerves cross meeting in the central part of the dome. The model of the dome is based on that of the Cathedral of Zamora, which was the first of the group of Duero domes, also called Leonese or Byzantine-Leonese domes (group formed by the domes of the cathedrals of Zamora, Old Cathedral of Plasencia, the Old Cathedral of Salamanca itself, and that of the Collegiate Church of Toro), which have a similar structure with two different domes, one on the inside and the other on the outside, between which there would be a filling of gravel and earth, although they rest one on the other. The exterior decoration of scaled form is very curious and difficult to trace in the History of Art, there being similar decorations in churches in Turkey, although they also appear in the decoration of the towers of the Church of Notre-Dame la Grande in Poitiers, a much more probable influence than the Turkish, if it is taken into account that people from France participated in the repopulation of the city.

Little remains of the original main façade, covered by another of the 13th century. It is flanked by two towers; the one on the left (torre de las campanas) was left under the tower of the New Cathedral, and the one on the right, which was never finished, was given the name of Torre Mocha, and can still be seen. The new doorway, shortly after being built, was partially covered, on the left side, by the stone slope that had to be made to reinforce the bell tower after the 1755 Lisbon earthquake.

Other attractions of the temple are the main altarpiece from the 15th century, attributed to Nicolò Delli (1430), and the upper fresco, representing the Last Judgment, which is certainly by Nicolò Delli (1445). The apse houses a large cycle of 53 tableaux, 12 of which by the 15th-century Italian artist Dello Delli, depicting the life of Jesus and the Virgin Mary. At the foot, under the Torre de las campanas, is the chapel of San Martín or del Aceite. The latter was painted by Antón Sánchez de Segovia in 1262. (Note: Its paintings are considered to be the oldest in Europe with signature) In the cloister there are some frescoes from the 13th-14th centuries that decorate the sepulchres and a series of chapels open, among which are the Chapel of Talavera, the Chapel of Santa Barbara, with the tomb of the bishop Juan Lucero, in which the examinations of degree of the University of Salamanca were carried out, the chapel of Santa Catalina and the chapel of San Bartolomé or de Anaya.

Juan Francés de Iribarren was organist at the Old Cathedral in 1717–1733.

== The main altarpiece ==
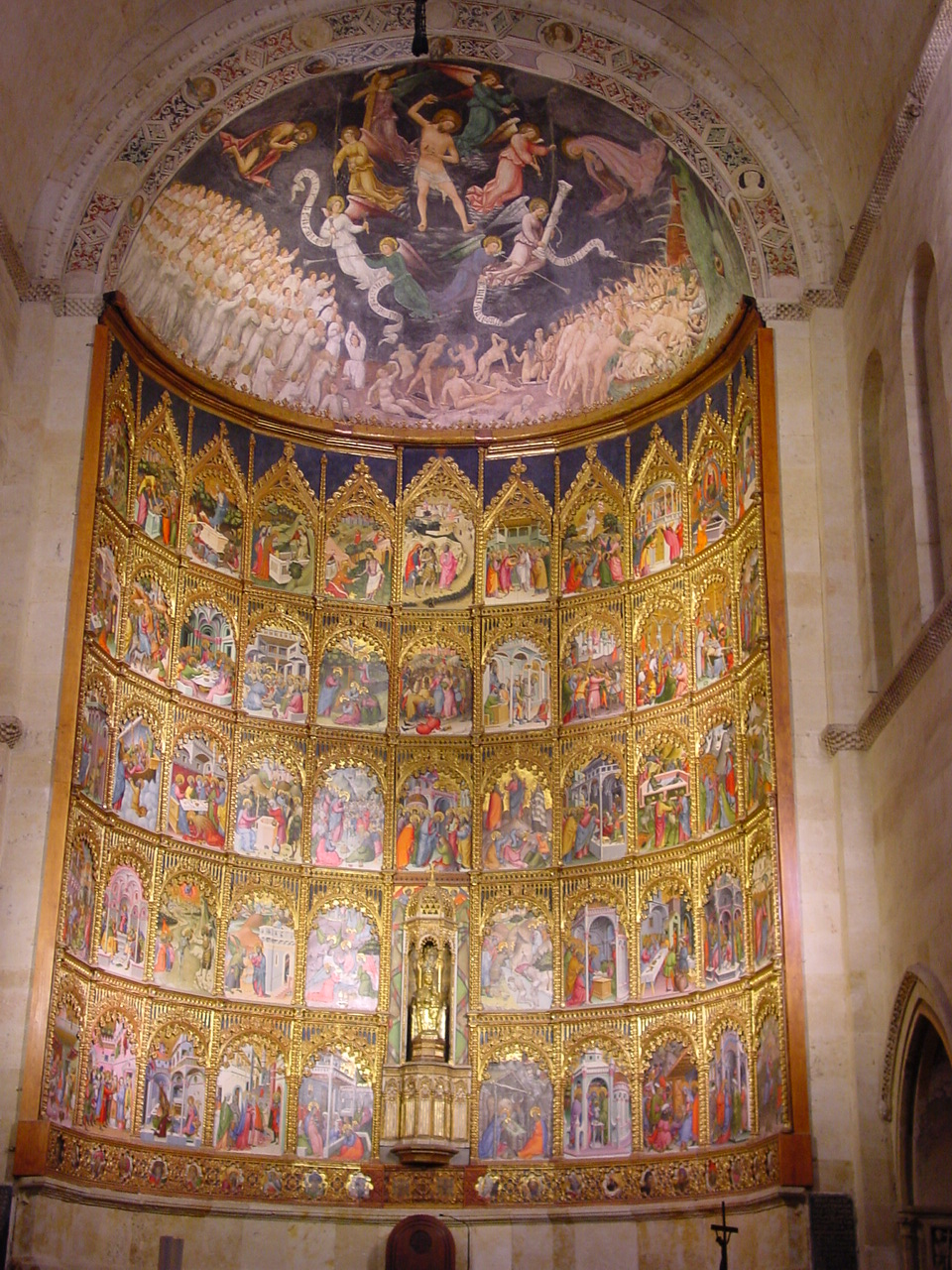
The main altarpiece, made between 1430 and 1450.

The work was placed between the years 1430-1450 and there are three authors working on the 53 panels that make up the altarpiece of the Old Cathedral of Salamanca.

The main works correspond to the Italian artist Dello Delli, to him correspond the first 12 panels, which are undoubtedly the ones with the highest quality. Dello would have the help of his two brothers, Sanson Delli made some boards of the central part of the altarpiece with the help of local artists who would work under the orders of Dello Delli. Finally, the third brother Nicolò Delli, better known as Niccolò Florentino, made some of the last panels of the work and the painting of the Last Judgment that is in the shell of the apse of the cathedral.

The altarpiece presents a cycle of the life of the Virgin Mary and Jesus Christ, from the Birth of the Virgin to the passage of the Mother of Christ, all accompanied by scenes from the life of Jesus and topped by the magnificent Last Judgment. The paintings are shown as very advanced for the artistic moment lived in Spain at that time, some of the Renaissance solutions that appear in the buildings of the paintings, as well as some domes that recall the work of Brunelleschi are too new for a country that still builds in Gothic. The vivid colors, with pink standing out among them, make the paintings very recognizable. The influence of Italian painting, in particular the Sienese and Florentine school, mixed with the typical details of Flemish painting, come together in a masterful way to offer a magnificent pictorial cycle.

The Last Judgment is represented in the apse shell, where Jesus Christ appears walking threateningly to separate the good from the bad. The right hand of Jesus is between the blessing and the threat, the left hand is taken to his chest with the intention of opening the wound in his side and showing it to the whole world. The iconographic scheme of Jesus Christ is the same as the one later used by Michelangelo for the Judgment of the Sistine Chapel. Christ appears surrounded by angels carrying different elements of the Passion. At his feet are the Virgin Mary and John the Evangelist kneeling, awaiting the advance of Jesus, who seems to be walking. To the right of Christ appears the saved, dressed in white, to his left the condemned, naked and seeming to walk towards the mouth of a giant monster. Between the figures of the damned, the faces of a bishop and a Pope can be seen, alluding to the fact that no one is free from God's judgment.

The altarpiece is presided over by an image known as the Virgin of la Vega, patron saint of the city. The image, made of wood, is covered with gilded bronze inlaid with enamel and precious stones. It comes from the disappeared monasterio de Santa María de la Vega, of regular canons of Saint Augustine located in the fertile valley of the Tormes river. It must be dated in the 12th century, follows Byzantine models, immobile, holds on his knees the child, showing it to the spectator with his right hand.

== The Chapel of San Martín or Capilla del Aceite ==
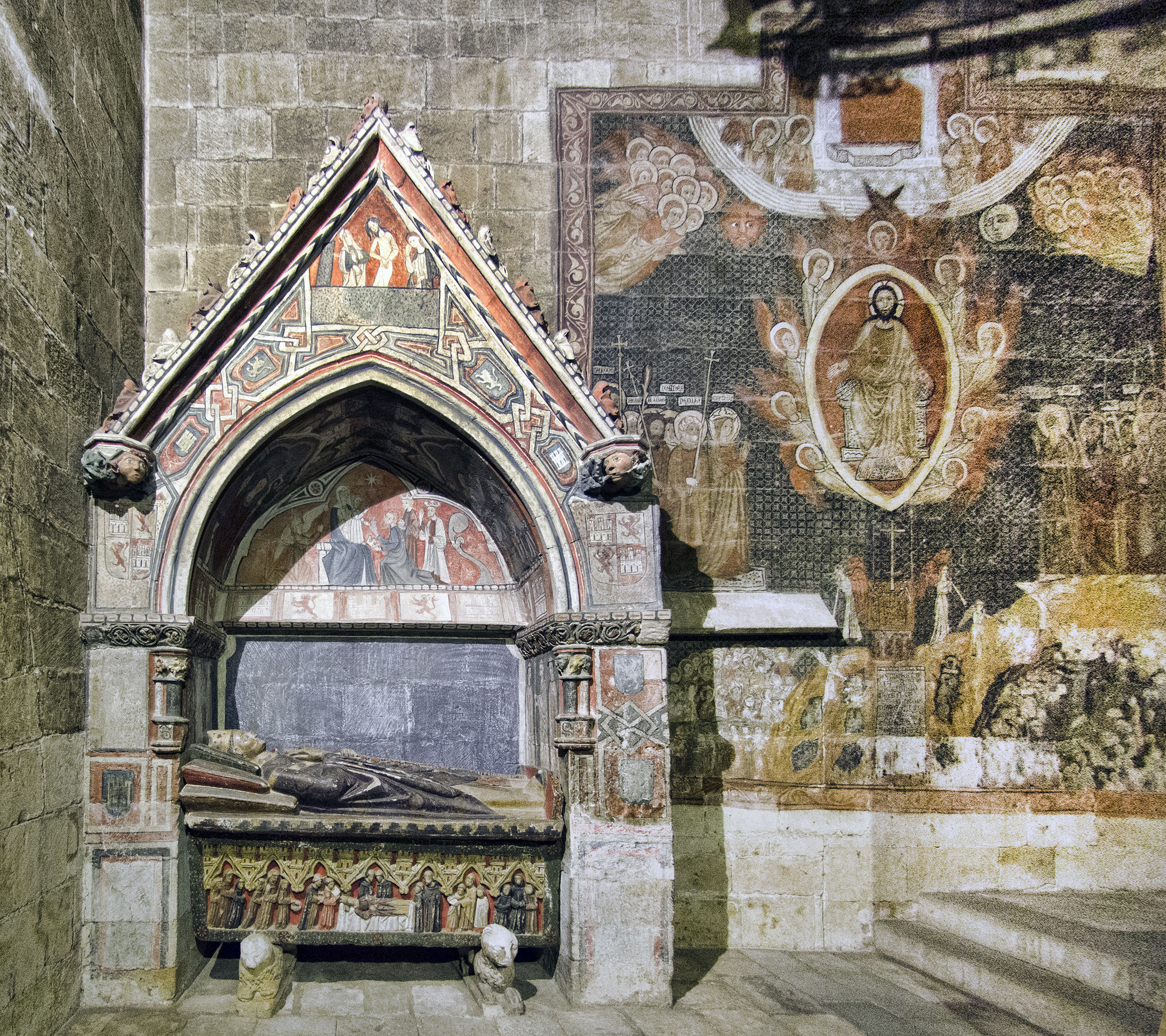
13th-century Romanesque mural paintings and sepulchers inside the Chapel of San Martín.

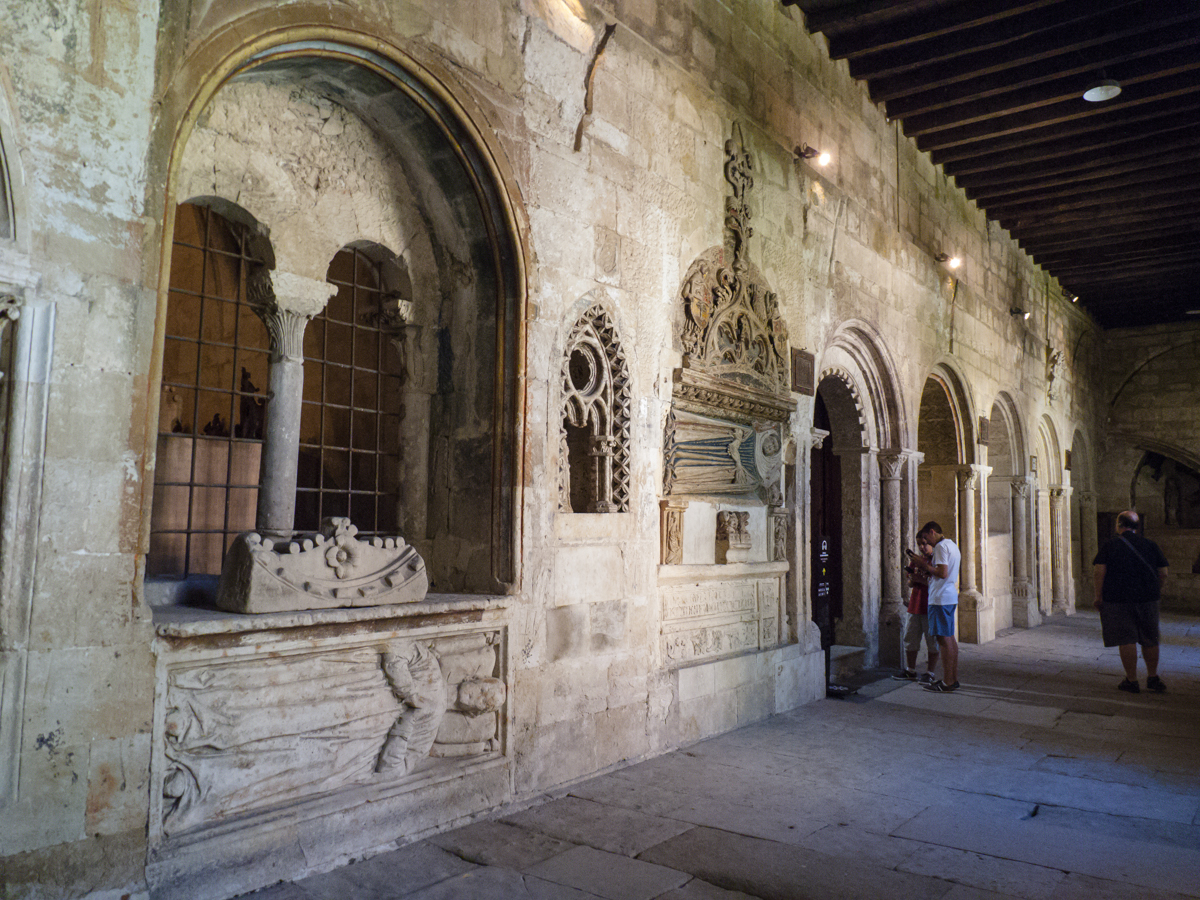
13th-century tombs and monuments in the interior of the Old Cathedral.

It is located under the so-called Torre de las Campanas (bell tower), on which the current tower of the New Cathedral was built. It seems that the name of the Saint Martin could not be placed as titular of the Cathedral because it was dedicated to the Virgin Mary, that is why a Saint as French as Martin, was relegated to a small chapel located at the foot of the cathedral, housed in the hollow of the bell tower. However, the name of the Saint could have been given to a Romanesque church that with a similar scheme to the cathedral, although smaller, was built outside the walls, where later the Plaza Mayor de Salamanca would be built (that is why, at the beginning it was called Plaza de San Martín). Just before entering the chapel and discovered a short time ago, there is a large painting on the wall of the temple where Saint Martin is sharing his cloak.

The most interesting thing that has this chapel are some paintings adorned with coats of arms of the kingdoms of León and Castile, some of which appear dated in the year 1262 and have as author to Antón Sánchez de Segovia, located in the back wall with images of Jeremiah, Isaiah and Daniel above and St. Joachim and St. Anne below, all of them under feigned architectural arches. Next to these, located in the side wall and made in the 16th century, stands out the image of the Last Judgment, painted as if it were a tapestry, where Jesus Christ is presented inside an almond, showing hands, feet and side to show the wounds of the passion, accompanied by Apostles and the Virgin, separating the saved from the damned.

There are also several tombs in the chapel, including that of Bishop Rodrigo Díaz, who died in 1339, and is decorated with paintings from the same period and scenes from the Adoration of the Magi. In front of this, another tomb houses the remains of the founder of the chapel, Pedro Pérez, who died in 1262.

== Cloister ==
The primitive cloister was damaged in the 1755 Lisbon earthquake and there are no appreciable remains in the site. The present one is the result of a later reconstruction. On its eastern and southern sides there are a series of chapels which are detailed below.

In 2013 was confirmed that the original cloister of the Old Cathedral of Salamanca was disassembled and is located reconstructed within a private estate of Palamós (Girona, Catalonia) (Romanesque cloister of the Mas del Vent in Palamós), this led to much criticism from a part of the population.

== Chapel of San Salvador or de Talavera ==
It is the oldest of all the chapels that form the cloister. It is covered with a dome with 16 parallel ribs two by two that are supported by columns, forming an eight-pointed star in the keystone. This type of dome is of Muslim influence and very strange for such an early period in northern Spain. In this chapel, founded by Rodrigo Maldonado de Talavera, a native of Talavera de la Reina, professor and rector of the university, the Mozarabic Rite has been maintained since the 16th century. The tomb of the founder and that of his wife are in the center of the chapel.

== The Chapel of Santa Bárbara ==
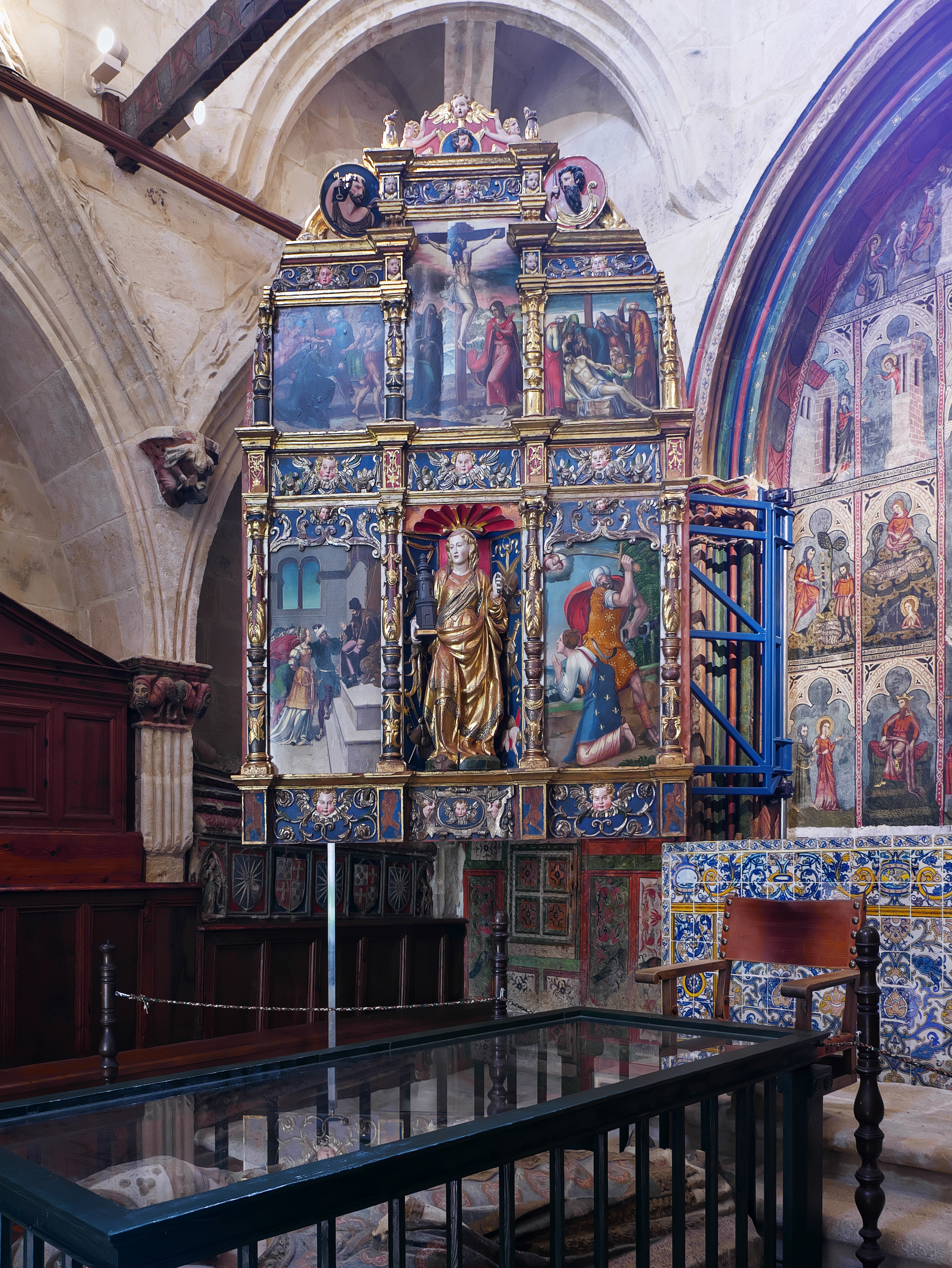
Chapel of Santa Bárbara: the tomb of Bishop Lucero and Reredos.

It was founded by Bishop Bishop Lucero in 1334, whose tomb is in the center, and is decorated with a small altarpiece that includes paintings depicting scenes of the death and passion of Christ and an image of the titular Saint, the latter made in the 16th century. The front of the altar shows a magnificent decoration of Talavera de la Reina pottery.

Since the beginnings of the University of Salamanca and when the studies were held in the cathedral, this chapel served as a place where the final exams were held.

The student who was going to take his degree or doctorate exam had to spend the whole night locked in the chapel, (which they used to do sitting on a chair, with their feet resting on those of the recumbent sculpture of Bishop Lucero, located in the center of the chapel) and preparing (watching over the books) the defense of their dissertation (degree) or their thesis (doctorate). The next morning the professors (and any other doctor who wished to intervene) would come in and sit on the benches around the chapel and discuss with the student point by point the reasons for his work.

If the student passed the exam, he would go out through the main door of the cathedral where his friends would be waiting for him and together they would have a party. If the degree obtained was that of doctor (the highest of university studies), his companions would write on a wall an anagram of the Latin word Victor (symbol) followed by his name - in letter or anagram as well - which would be equivalent to "Victory!". From a certain moment on (perhaps at the beginning of the 17th century), to celebrate the feast, the doctoral student had to offer a bull to his fellow students, which, previously bullfighting and stewing, was used for the celebratory meal (which meant that obtaining a doctorate was only within the reach of people with the means to do so).

If the student did not pass the exam, he left through another door, known as the "puerta de los carros", a close communication with the calle de Tentenecio where there were neither friends nor party.

=== Discovery ===
On Wednesday, February 26, 2020, the Minister of Culture and Tourism, Javier Ortega, and the Bishop of Salamanca, Carlos López unveiled the works carried out in recent months in the restoration of this chapel. The altarpiece that was disassembled for cleaning and restoration. When it was dismantled, an ancient altarpiece with Gothic paintings representing the life of Saint Barbara came to light. The solution for the two altarpieces to remain in place has been to add a mobile structure that allows the 16th-century altarpiece to be moved so that the former Gothic altarpiece remains in view.

== Chapter rooms of the cloister ==
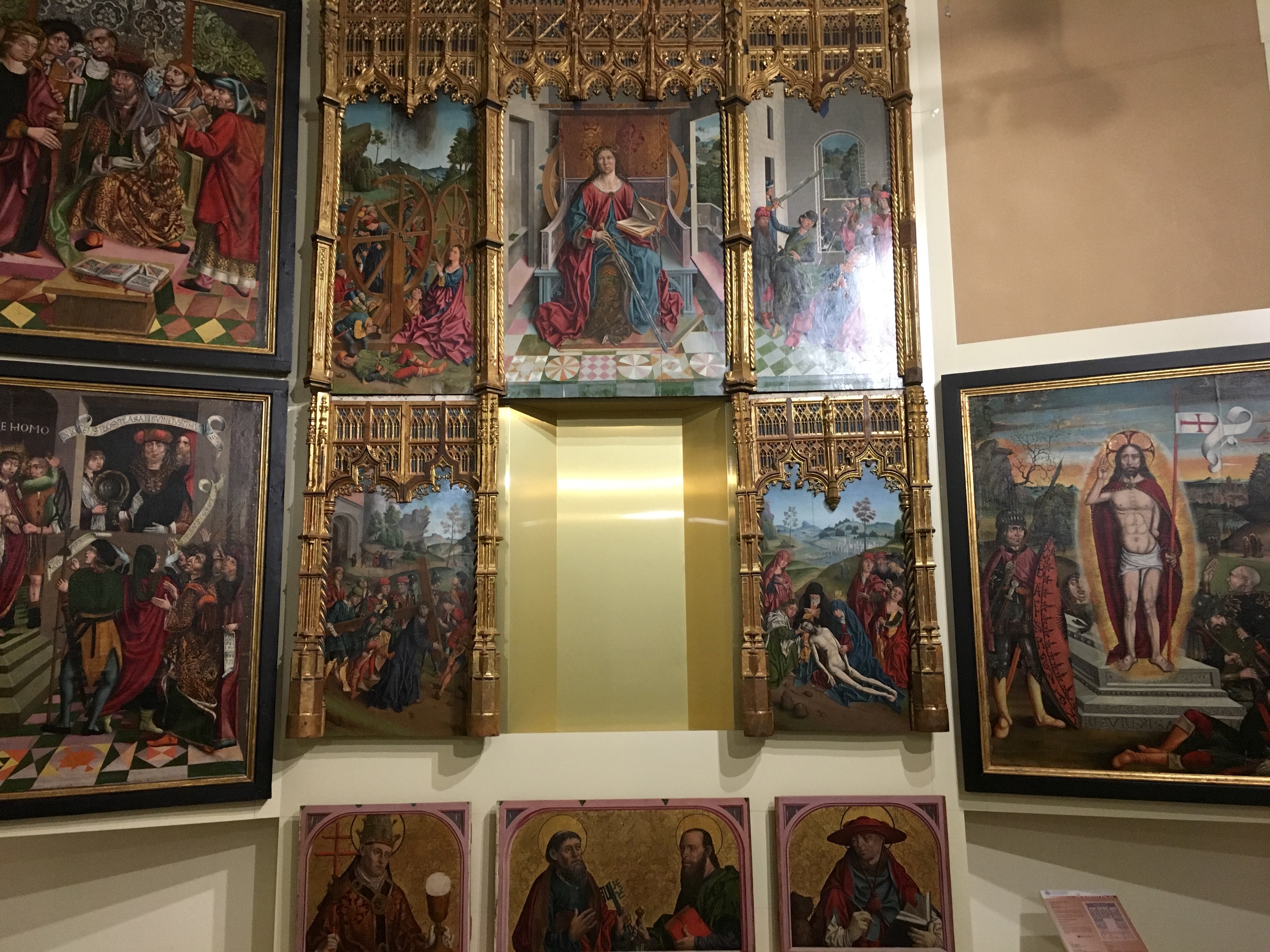
The altarpiece of Santa Catalina, by Fernando Gallego, is one of the most outstanding works of the Cathedral Museum of Salamanca located in the Chapter Rooms.

It is currently used as Cathedral Museum housing some of the paintings of which the Cabildo is depositary, these chapter rooms were built in the year 1526. Among them the most outstanding are three works of the artist Fernando Gallego that would be painted in the second half of the 15th century.

The most outstanding of these paintings is the triptych representing the Martyrdom of Saint Catherine, painted in Flemish style, easily recognizable by the raised floors and the vanishing line that always goes diagonally to the right. This, together with the detail and realism with which the works are painted, makes them recognizable in this author. One only has to look at the panel on the right where an executioner appears cutting the head of the Saint, but the cut is so recent that the head is still half fallen.

Details like this can be seen in the panel of Jesus with the Carrying of the Cross where one of the sayons kicks Christ while another one of them sticks out his tongue to insult him. Such detail is typical of the Flemish painting that flourished in the Crown of Castile of the 15th century.

The second of the rooms is covered with a rich coffered ceiling in Mudéjar style with Renaissance ornamentation, which was made by the carpenter Pedro Nieto. A painting by Fernando Gallego depicting the Birth of Christ is preserved here.

In the third room there are works by the artist Pedro Bello, a disciple of Fernando Gallego, works that can be dated around 1500. Next to them are a triptych and four panels by a mediocre follower of Dello Delli.

== Chapel of Santa Catalina ==
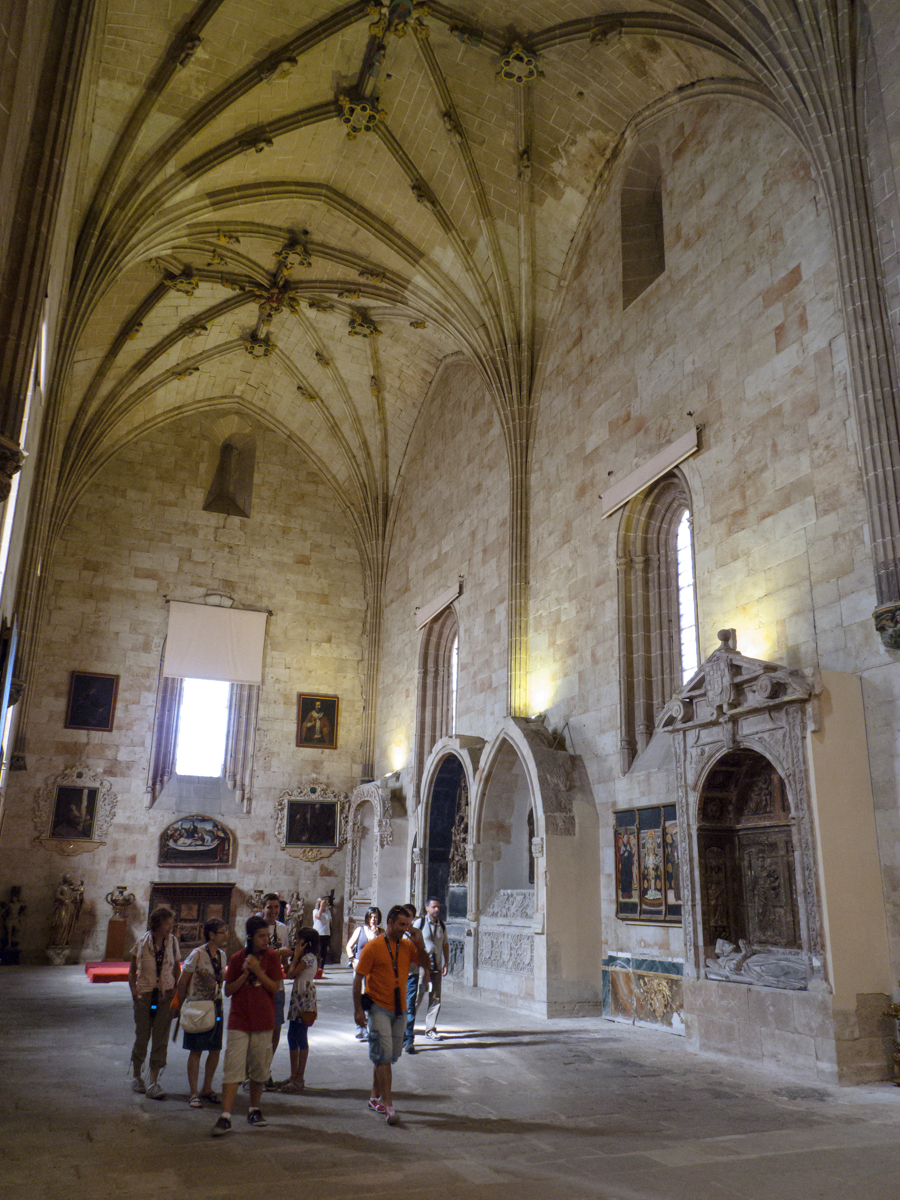
Chapel of Santa Catalina

The Chapel of Santa Catalina, also known as Capilla del Canto, was founded by Bishop Vidal in the 12th century. It was later enlarged and refurbished in the 15th century to house the chapter library. It is the largest chapel in the cloister.

Throughout its history the chapel has had different uses. It was where students of the University of Salamanca were examined to gain access to the bachelor's degree. It was also the seat of medieval compostelan synods, a place of celebration for the meals of grace and a singing chapel where music was taught in one of the main chairs of the Spanish universities, which is why it houses the tomb of master Doyagüe. In the 20th century the space became an exhibition room-warehouse that housed different cathedral works of art without exhibition order. With the restructuring of the Cathedral Museum in the Chapter Rooms, the space was freed for its comprehensive restoration in 2018, after which it has added to its heritage character the use as a hall for holding cultural activities such as conferences and concerts.

== Chapel of San Bartolomé or de los Anaya ==
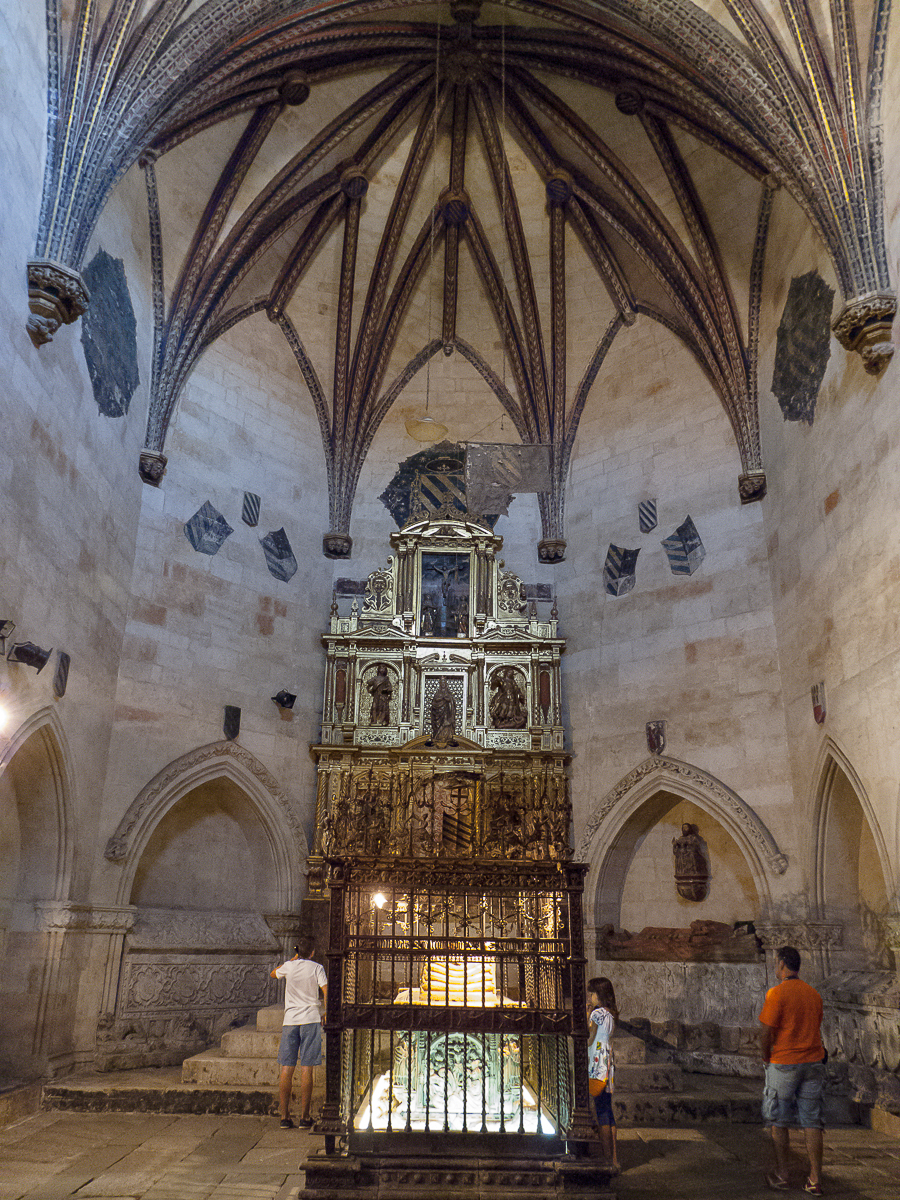
Chapel de los Anaya

In the central part is the tomb of the founder of the chapel and patriarch of the Diego de Anaya family, bishop of Salamanca and archbishop of Seville, devotee of Saint Bartholomew and sponsor who founded the Colegio Mayor de San Bartolomé or Old College (the oldest in Salamanca). It is made in alabaster, possibly by a German master; it is surrounded by a very beautiful grille (which partially prevents the vision of the sepulcher) also made in the 16th century, full of decoration and with constant allusions to death. Other members of the Anaya family are buried in the same chapel, where two of the tombs conserve the original colors with which they were made.

This chapel was reformed in the 16th century, as can be appreciated in the starry vault that covers the ceiling of the same one.

In addition in the chapel an organ is conserved that happens to be one of the oldest that exist, dated in the 16th century; at the moment it is placed on top of a magnificent podium of Mudéjar style and conserves paintings in the front that represent an Annunciation of the Virgin. The organ is in perfect working order.

== The Casa de la Cabeza ==
It is a house of the 16th century attached to the Chapel of Santa Catalina with door to the calle Gibraltar, in front of the Casa Lis. In its origins it could have housed the Minor College of the House of Uclés of the Order of Santiago, which is why a relief was placed on the facade with the head of Saint James the Great that gives its name to the building. The house was also used as housing for members of the cathedral chapter until it fell into disuse and became dilapidated. It has been possible to integrate it into the touristic tour of the Cathedrals, housing the rest room, toilets, souvenir store and exit of the building. There are also archaeological remains, which include two columns that may have belonged to the Romanesque cloister of the cathedral, have been integrated into these spaces.

== Gallery ==
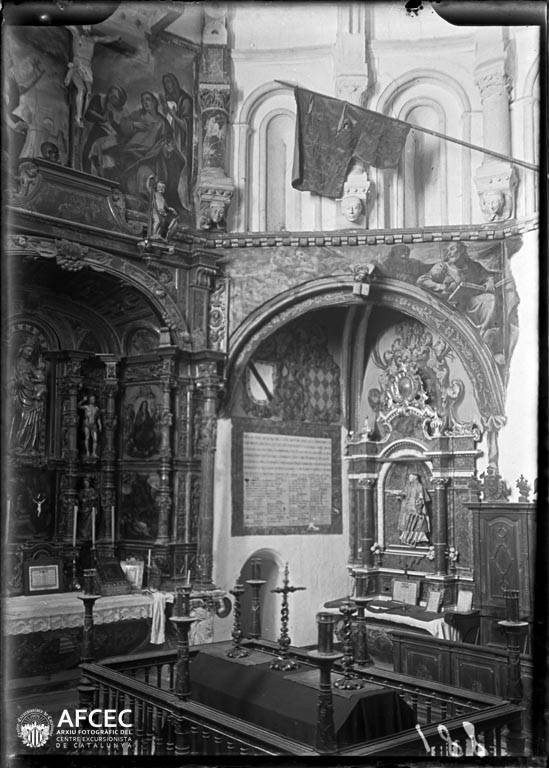
Chapel of Talavera of the Old Cathedral, photo dated 1880–1926. Memòria Digital de Catalunya.

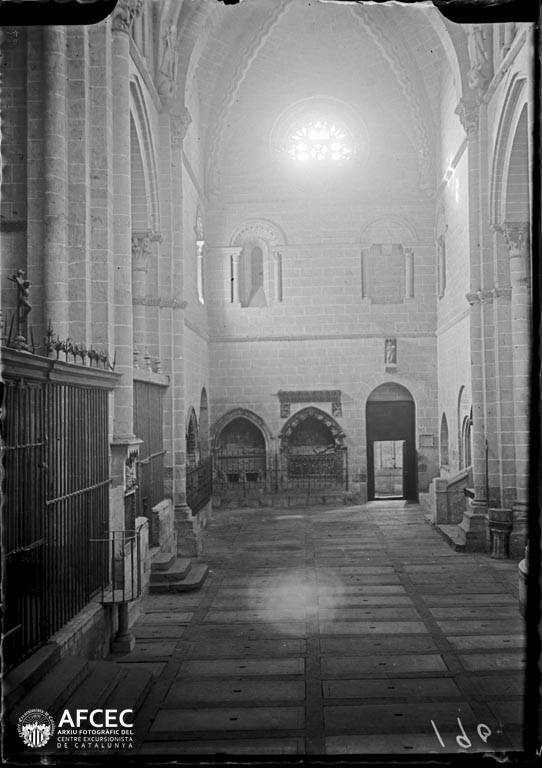
Interior view of the Old Cathedral, photo dated 1880–1926. Memòria Digital de Catalunya.

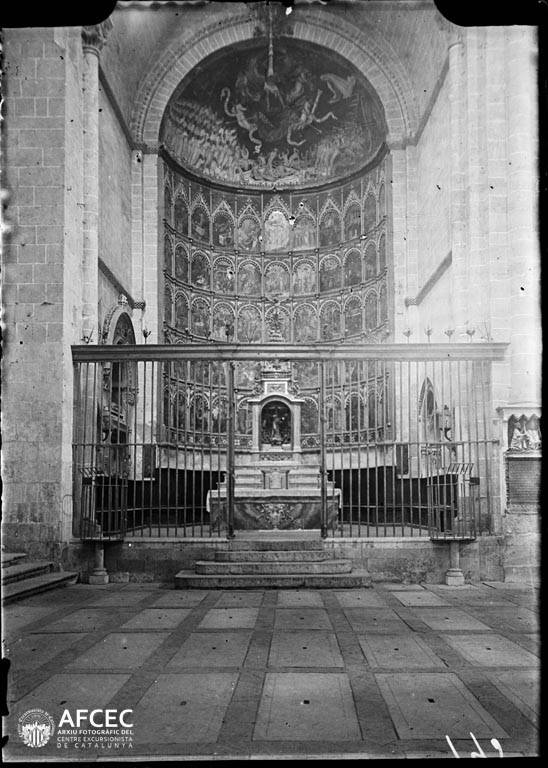
Main altarpiece of the Old Cathedral, photo dated 1880–1926. Memòria Digital de Catalunya.

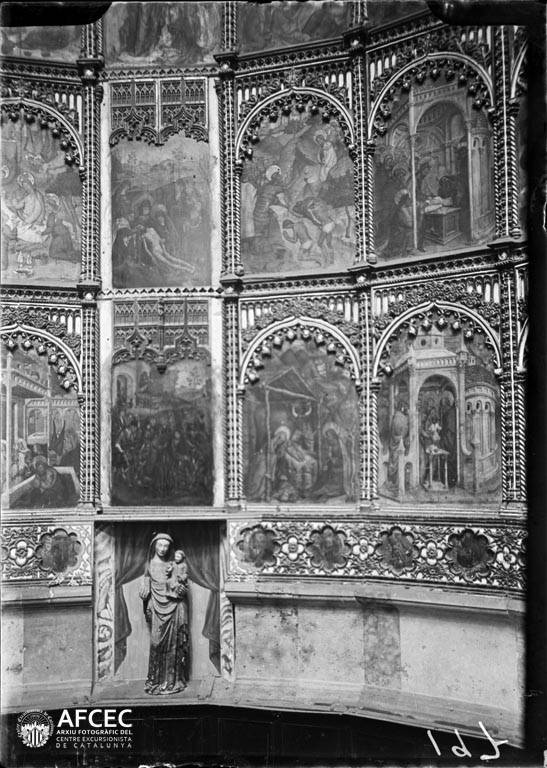
A reredos, Old Cathedral, photo dated 1880–1926. Memòria Digital de Catalunya.

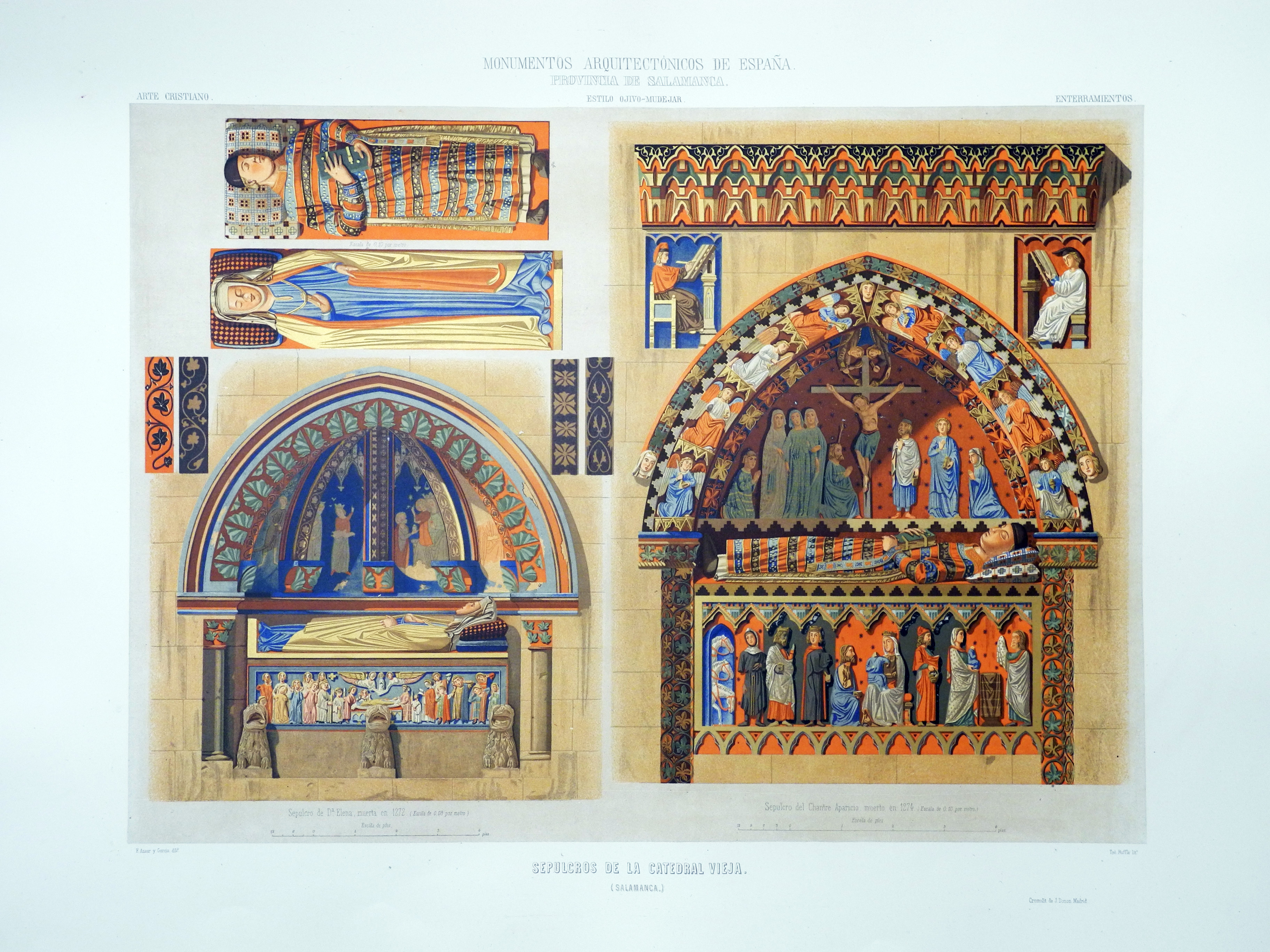
"Salamanca. Some sepulchers of the Old Cathedral", chromolithograph by Teófilo Rufflé, illustrated page of 1865.

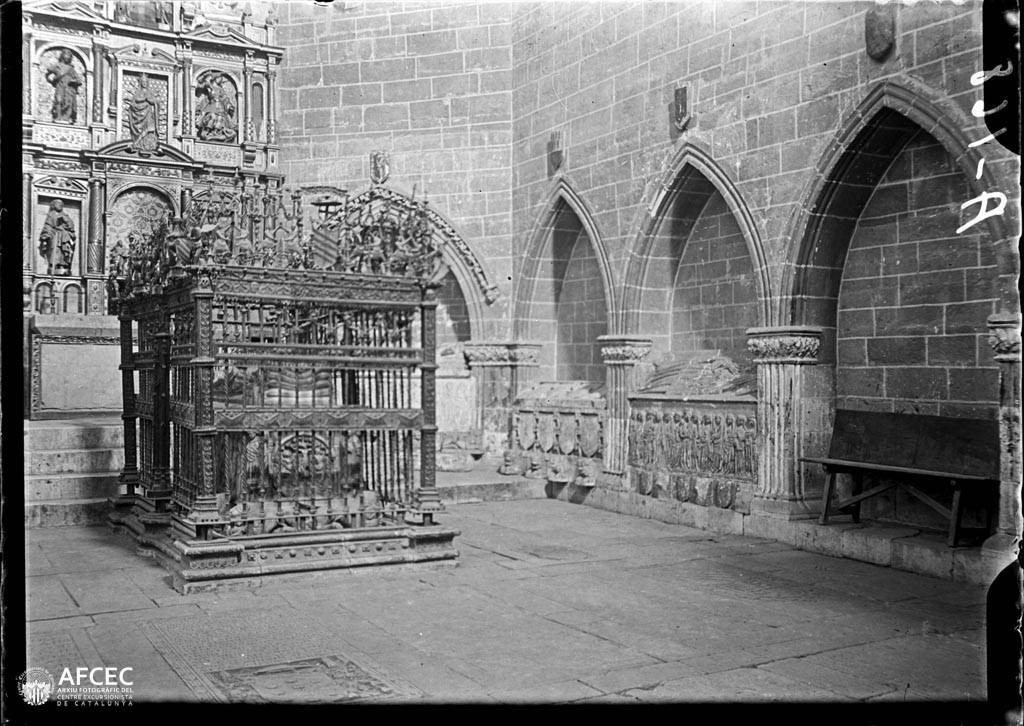
Sepulcher and reredos of the Chapel of los Anaya, photo dated 1880–1926. Memòria Digital de Catalunya.

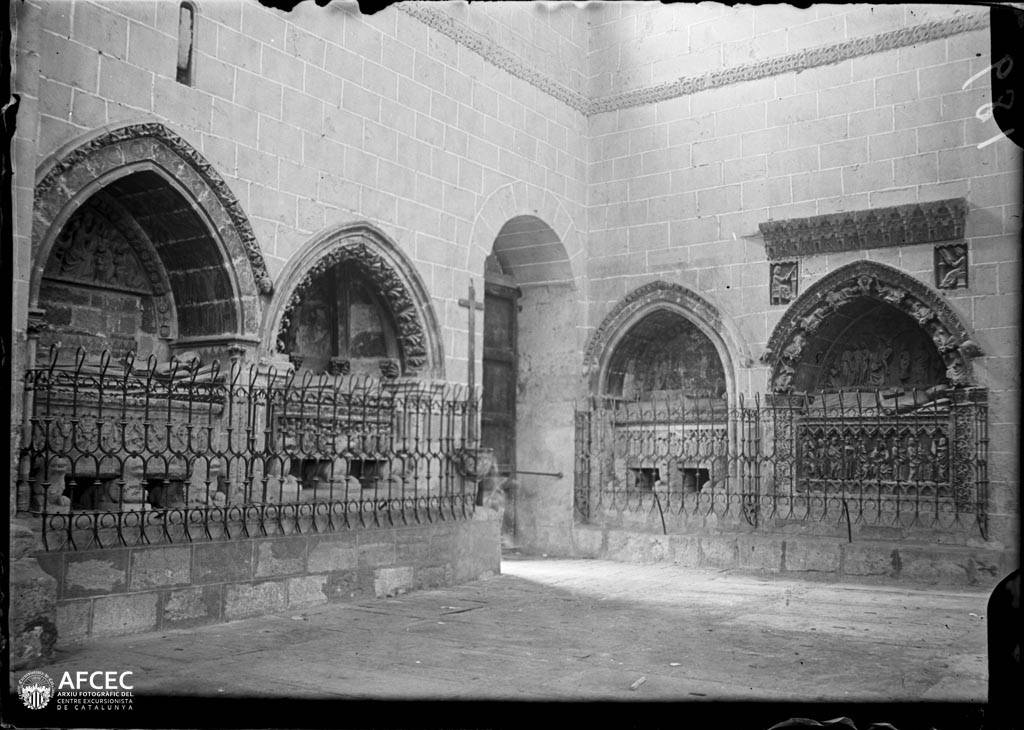
Sepulchers in the interior, photo dated 1880–1926. Memòria Digital de Catalunya.

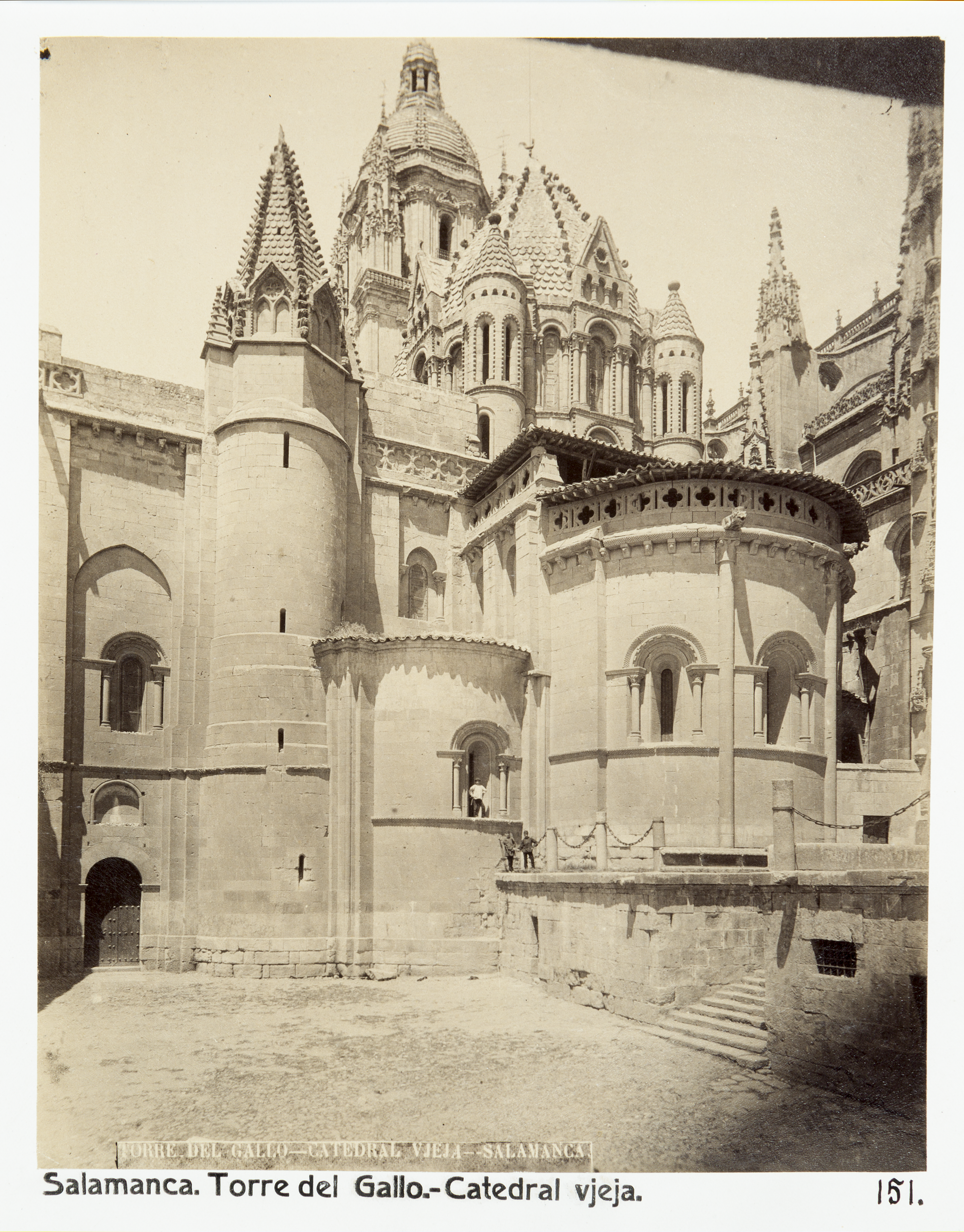
Torre del Gallo, Old cathedral, before 1895 by Jenny Bergensten. Hallwyl Museum.

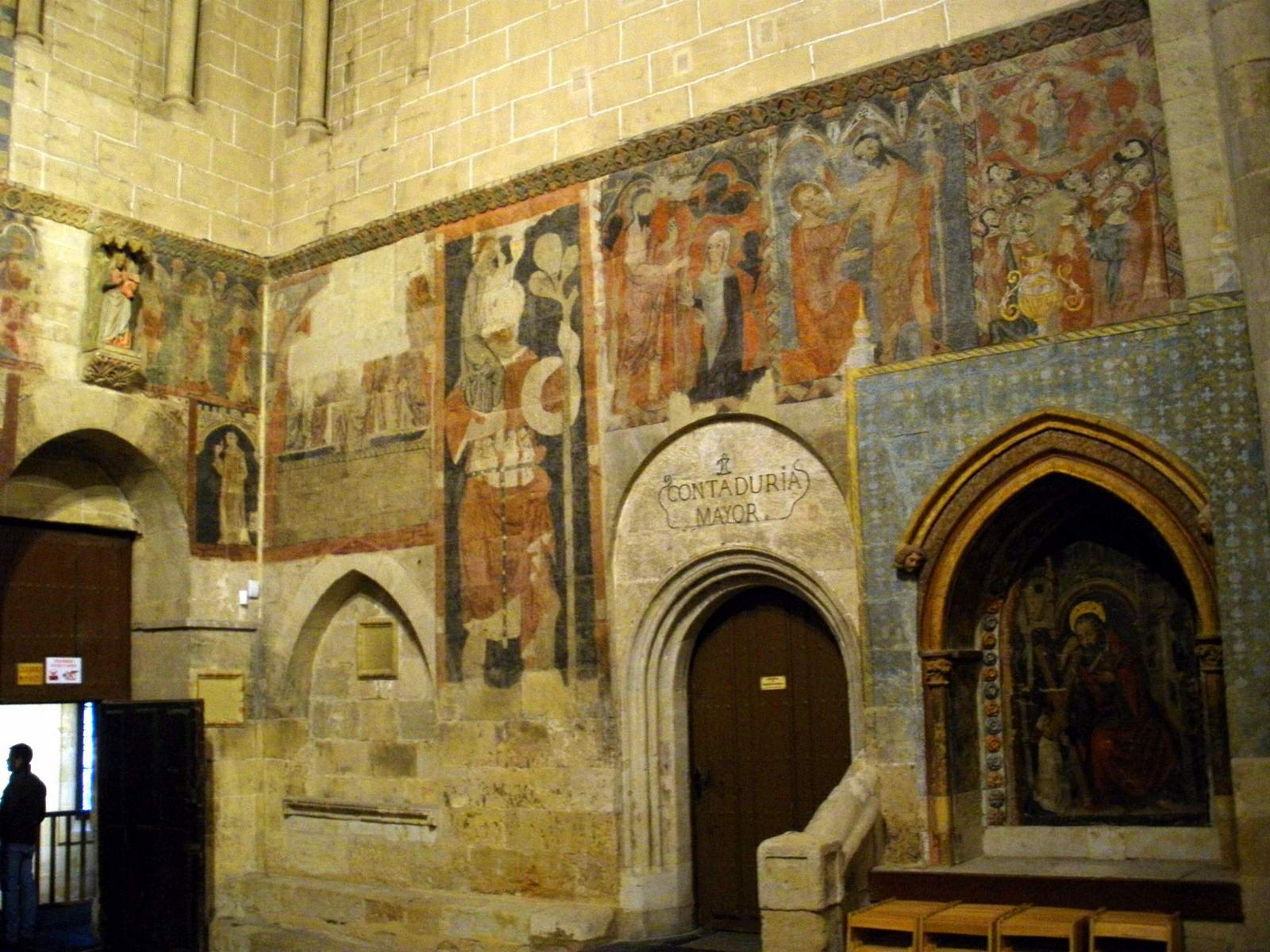
Gothic frescoes

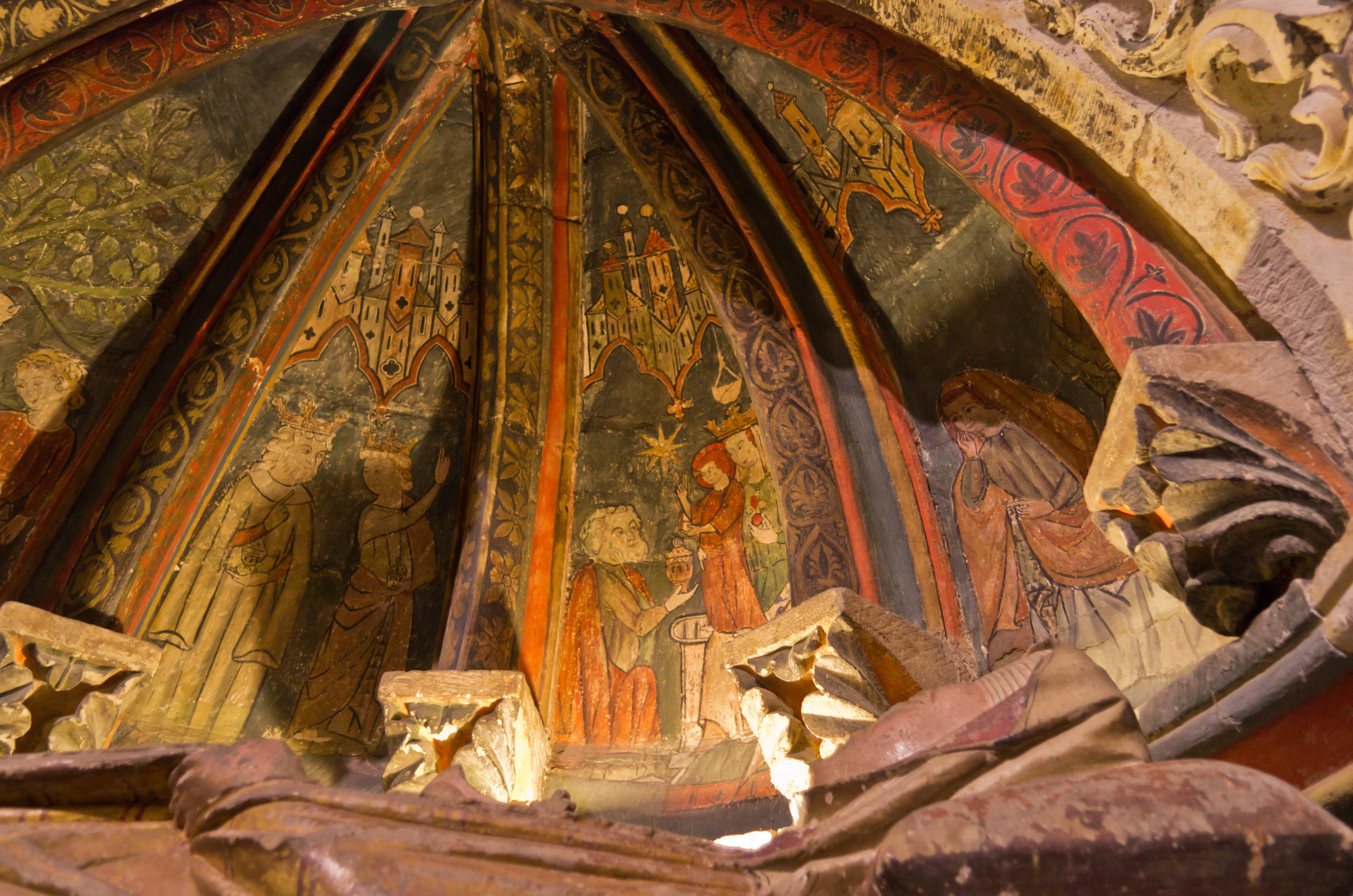
Gothic frescoes

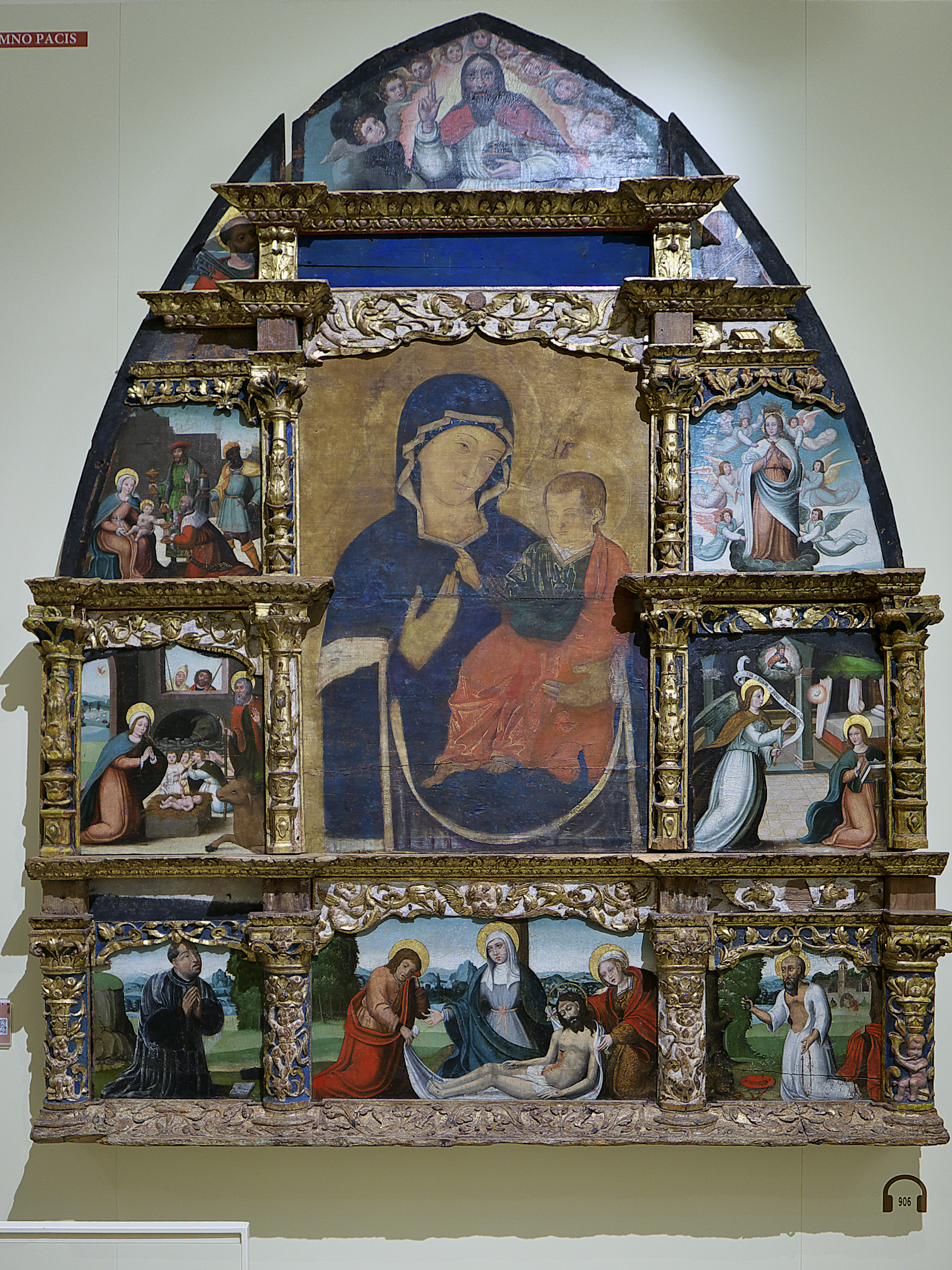
Reredos of the Virgen de Pópolo (c. 1533), polychrome wood, donated by Pedro Imperial, canon of the cathedral.

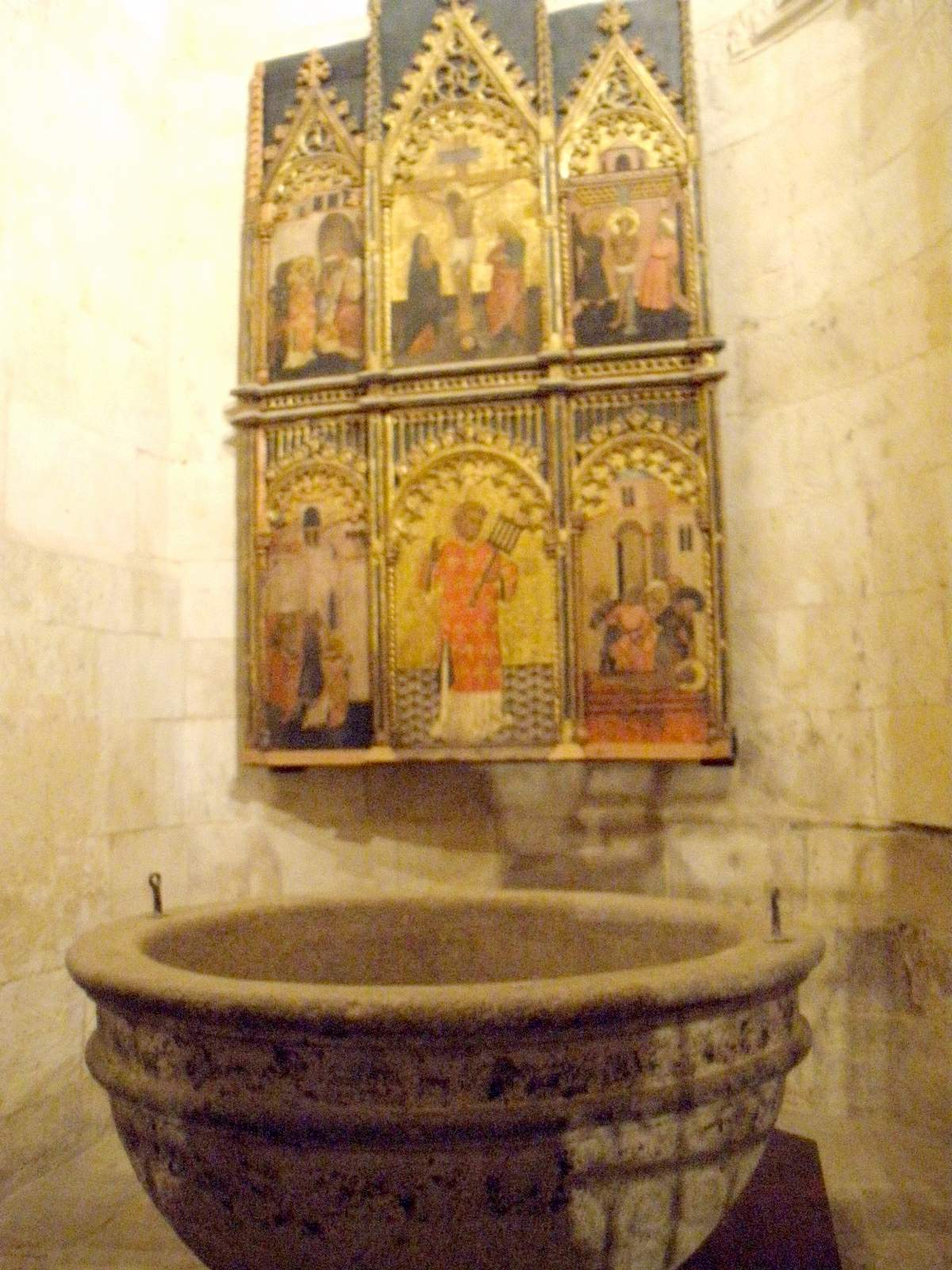
Gothic reredos

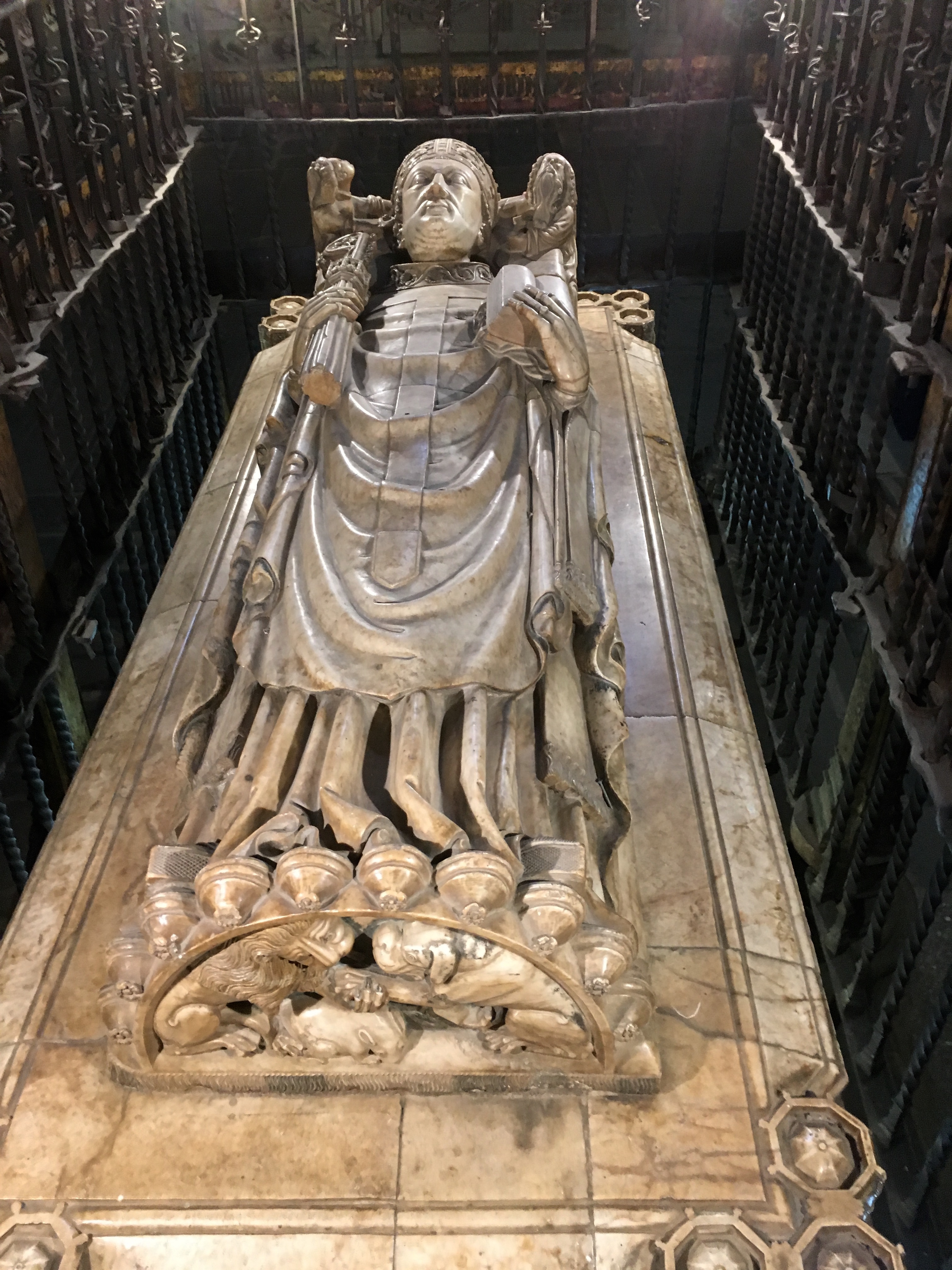
Sepulcher of Diego de Anaya, made in the mid-15th century by a German master.

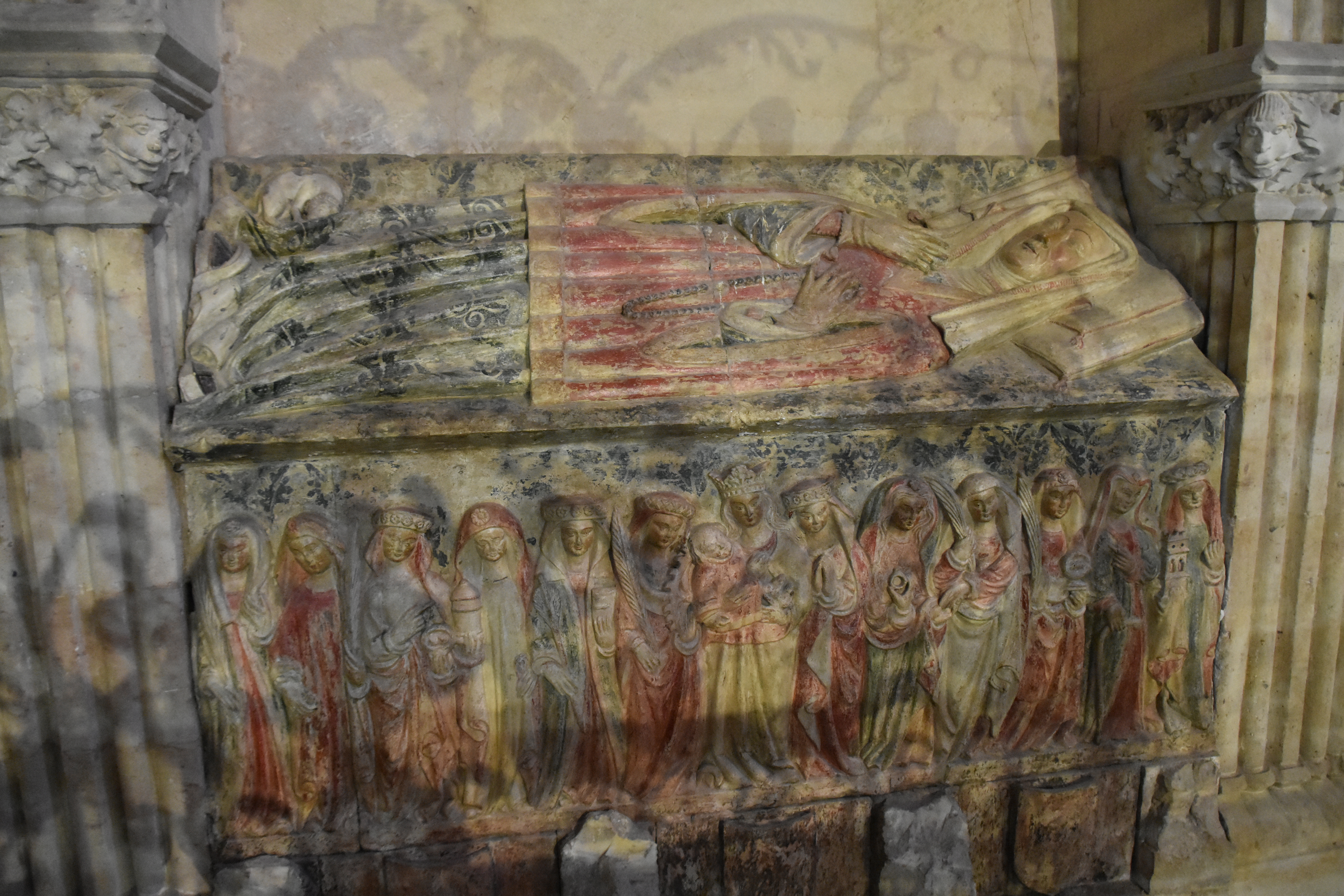
Polychrome medieval tomb (13th century)

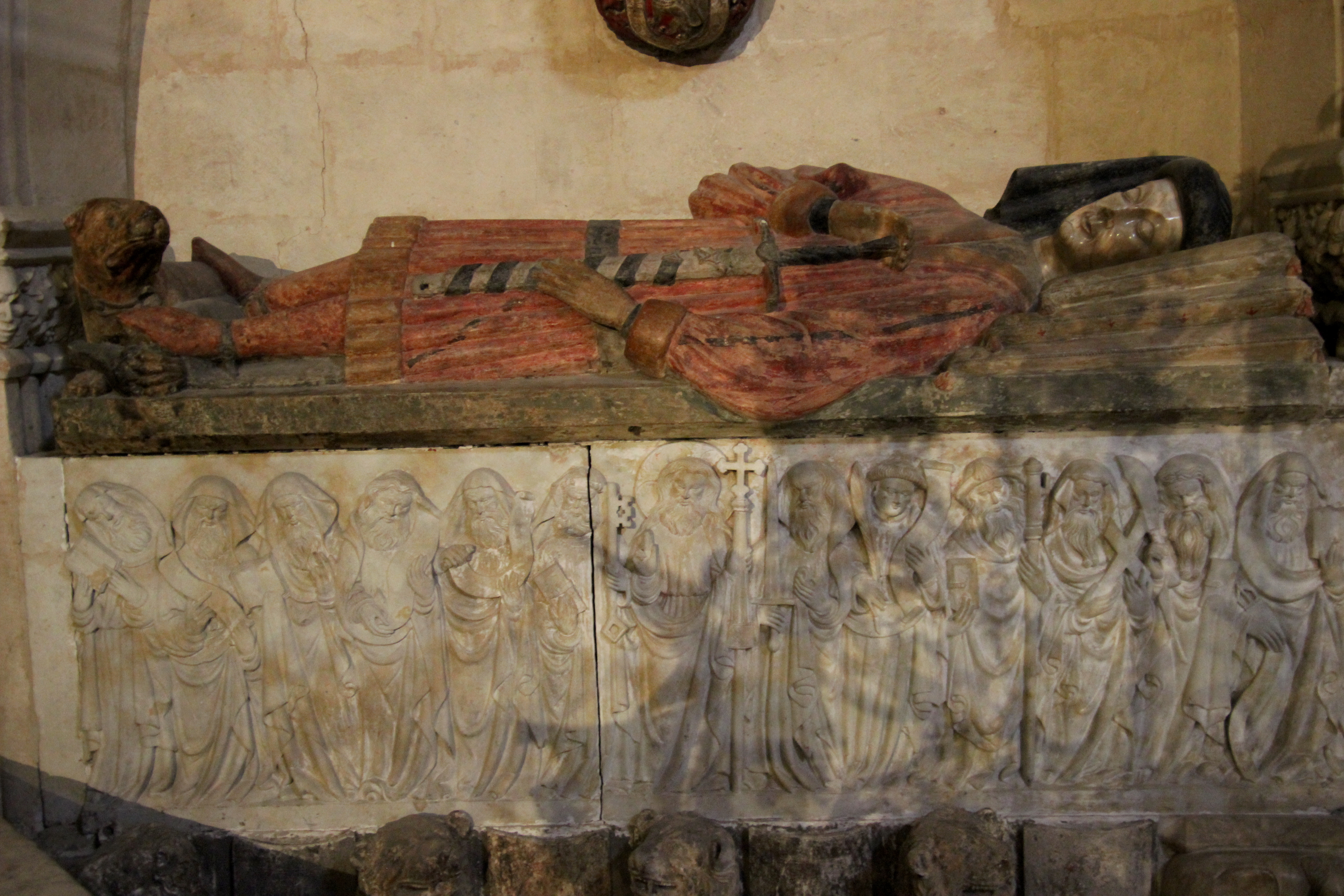
Sepulcher of Fernán Nieto, 15th century, Chapel of Los Anaya.

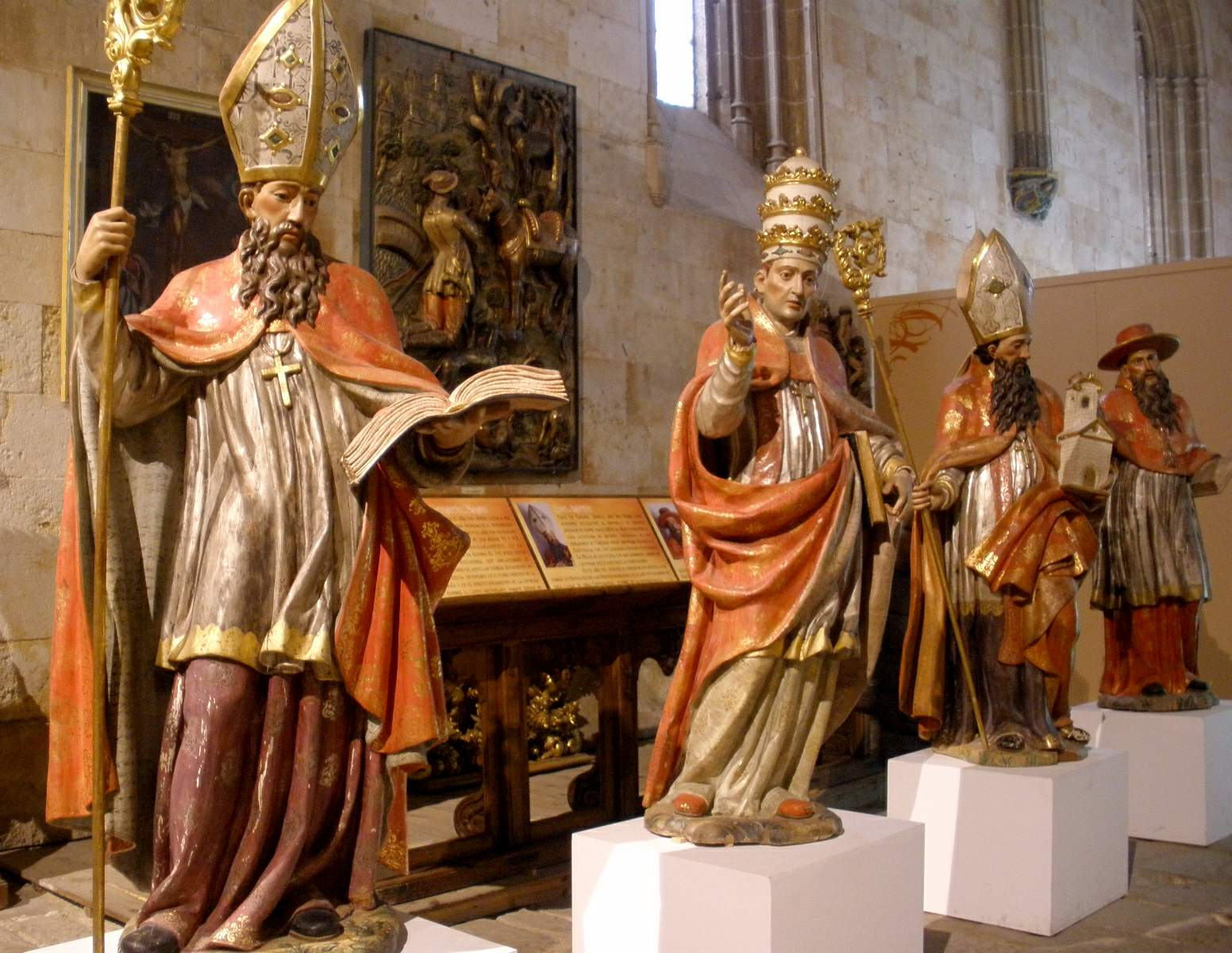
Western Church Fathers in the Chapel of Santa Catalina

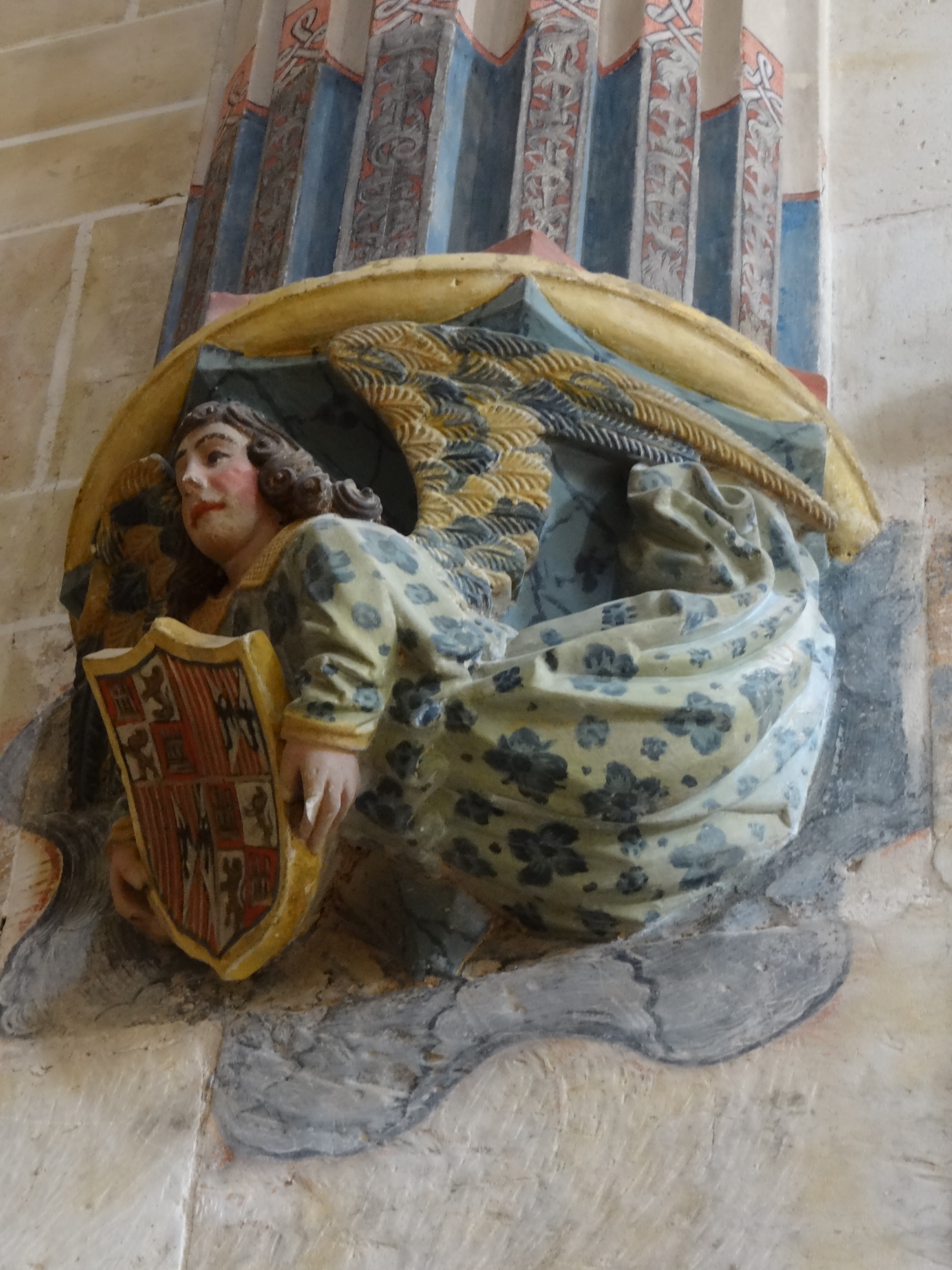
Chapel of Santa Catalina

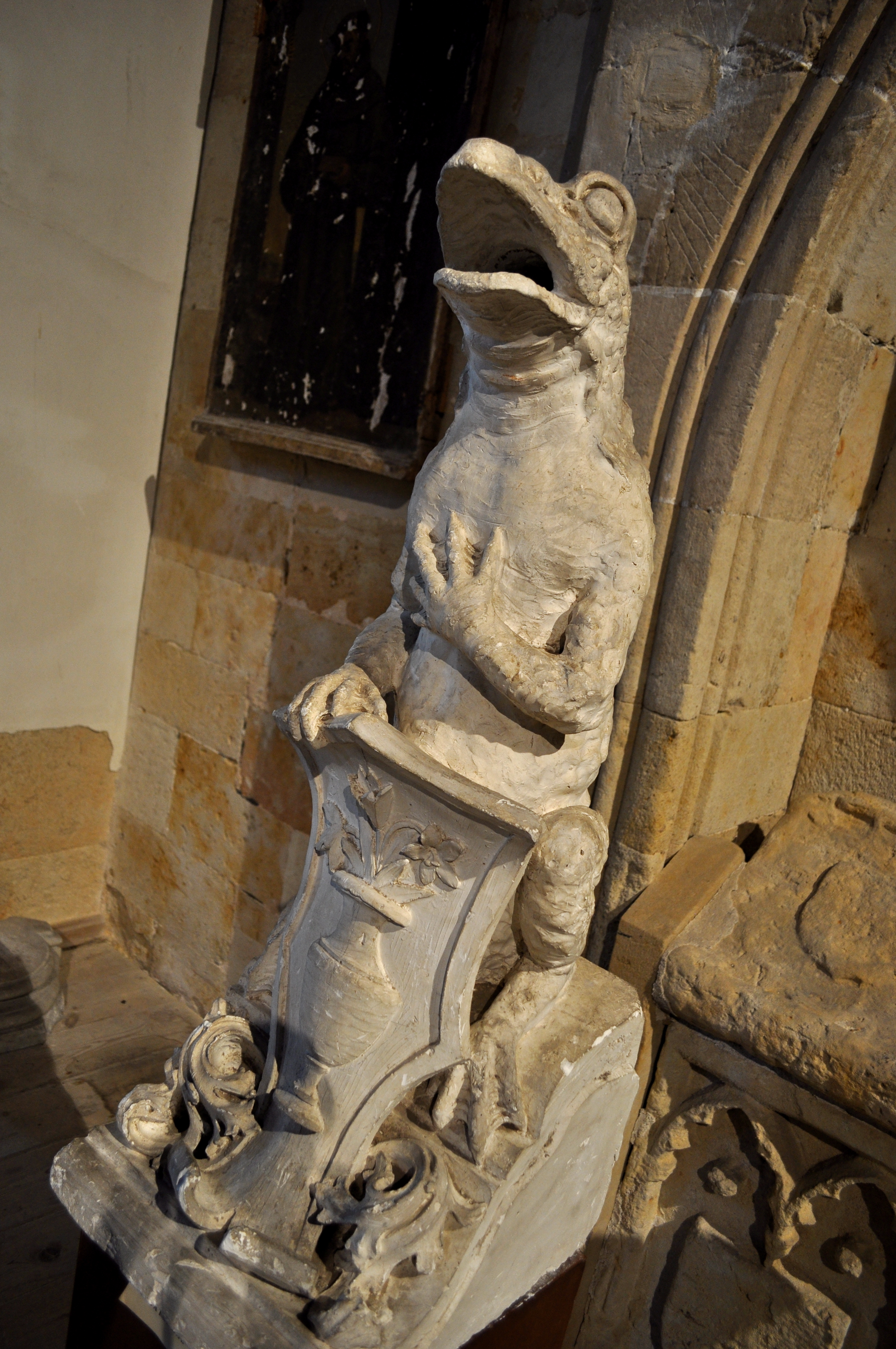
Chapel of Santa Catalina

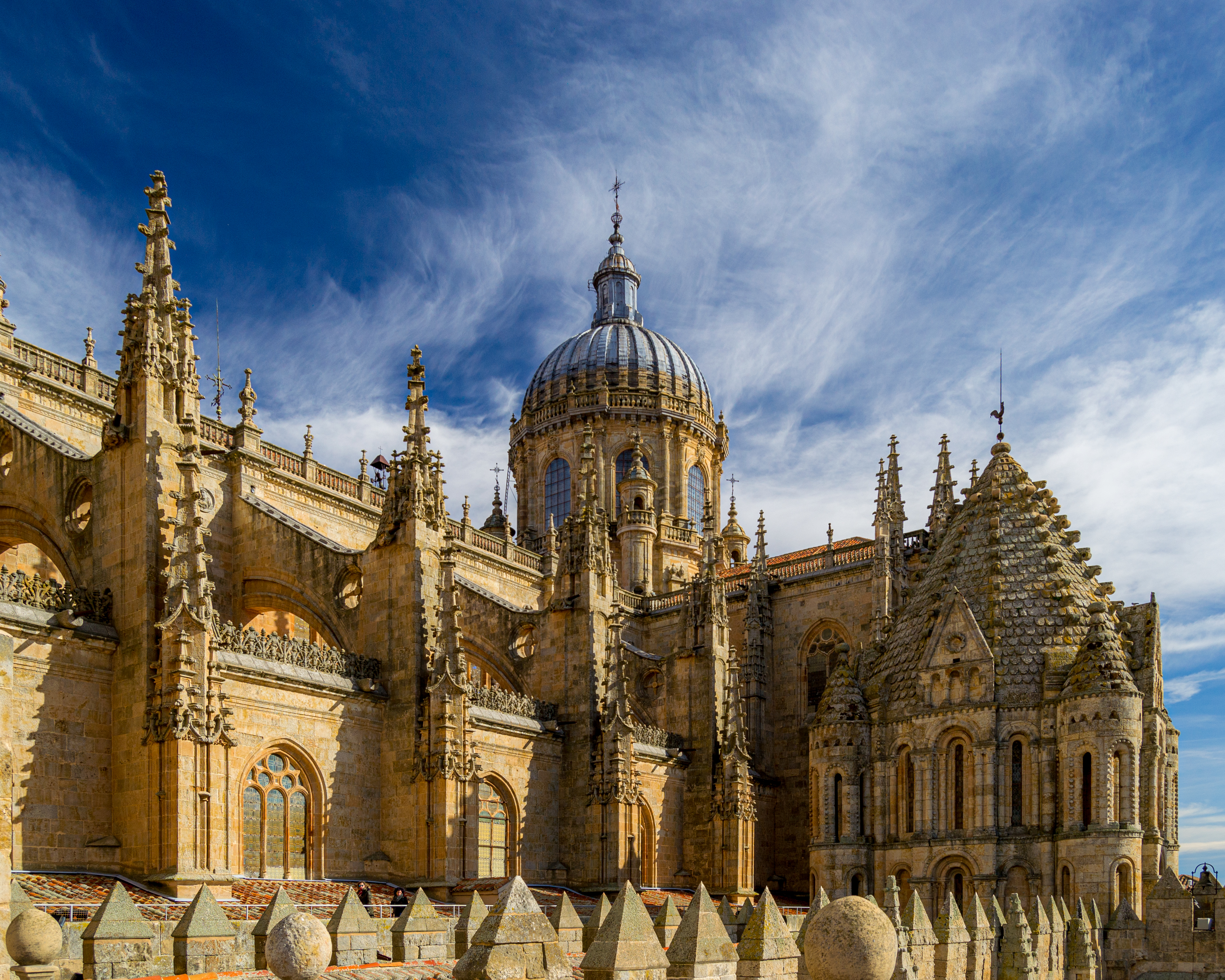
The two cathedrals

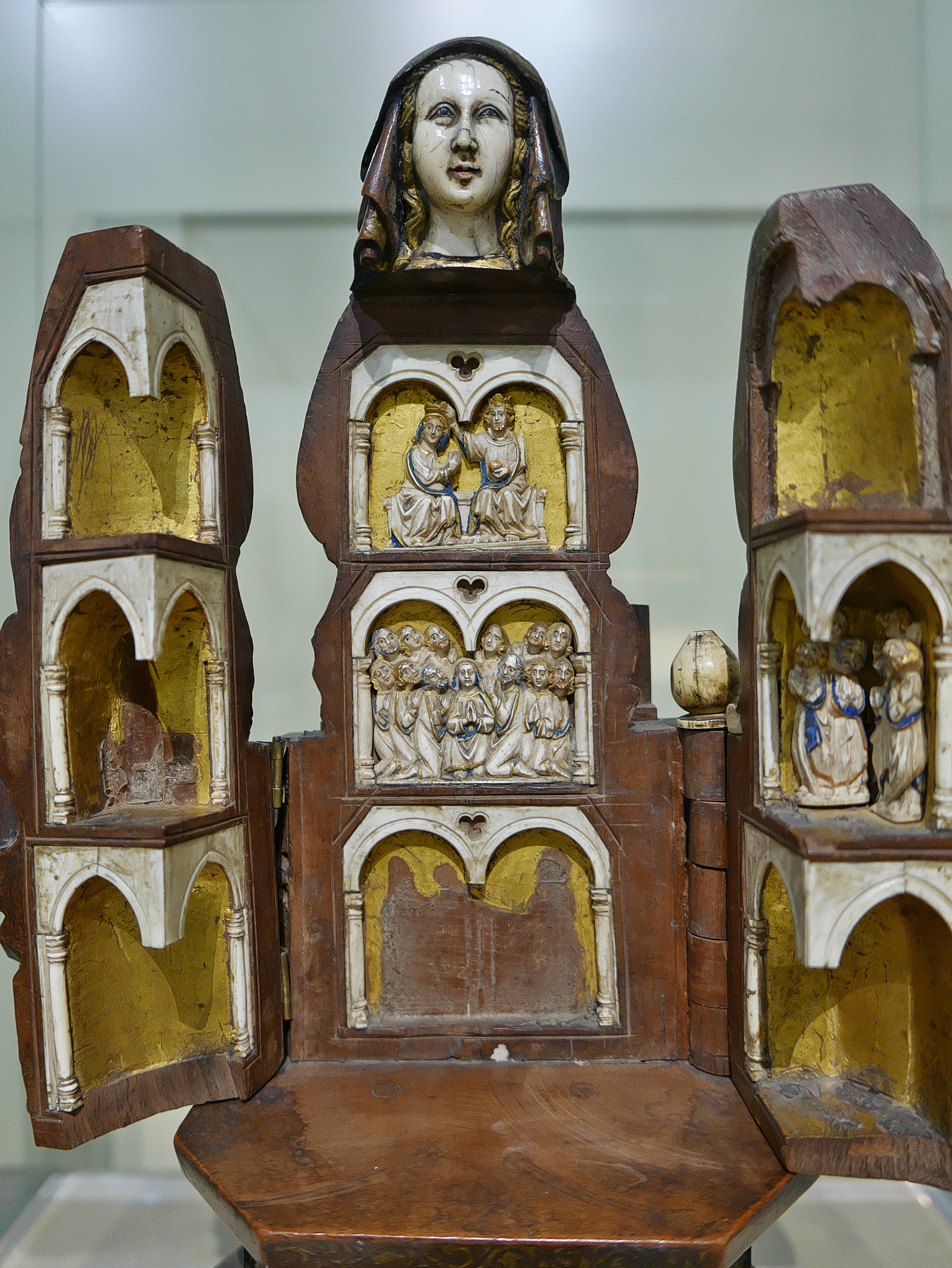
Virgen Abridera, dated to 13th century, a common tradition in medieval Europe, in the Cathedral Museum

== Trinity Church (Boston) ==
The 1872's main tower of the Trinity Church (Boston) was based on the romanesque tower of this cathedral.

== See also ==
- New Cathedral, Salamanca
- High medieval domes
