= Dello =

Dello is a surname. Notable people with the surname include:

- Dello di Niccolò Delli (ca. 1403 – ca. 1470), an Italian artist
- Pete Dello (1942–2026), English singer-songwriter

== Places ==
- Dello, Lombardy, a comune in the province of Brescia, Italy
- Lake Déllő, Hungary
