= Martín de Cande =

Spanish priest

- Bishop of Segovia
- Church: Catholic Church
- Diocese: Diocese of Segovia
- In office: 1364–1370
- Predecessor: Juan Lucero
- Successor: Juan Sierra

Martín de Cande, sometimes known as Nuño de Cande, was a Spanish priest who, after holding the positions of dean and capiscol of Toledo Cathedral serves as Bishop of Segovia from 10 June 1364 to 1370, after the death of Juan Lucero.

In 1365, he approved the foundation of the convent of La Merced, carried out by the Segovian noblewoman Elvira Martínez, mother of Pedro Fernández Pecha, founder of the Order of Saint Jerome. Also during his reign of the diocese, a tragic accident occurred at the Alcázar of Segovia, in which Pedro Enríquez de Castilla, the natural son of King Henry II of Castile, died. The cathedral chapter officiated at his burial, and the child was buried in the original cathedral.

The length of his reign is unclear: José María Quadrado maintains that his reign lasted from 1362 to 1368, although he appears as bishop in 1370, acting as an arbitrator judge alongside the Jew Çag Abudacham, so it must have ended that year, coinciding with the mandate of the next bishop, Juan Sierra.

The date of his death is unknown, but it occurred in 1370. He was buried in Mozarabic Chapel in Toledo Cathedral.

Catholic Church titles
Preceded by Juan Lucero	Bishop of Segovia; 1364–1370	Succeeded by Juan Sierra
