= Gonzalo II =

Gonzalo II (died 1358) was a Franciscan friar from Castile who served as Bishop of Segovia from 1355 to 1358.

Catholic Church titles
Preceded by Pedro Gómez Gudiel	Bishop of Segovia; 1355–1358	Succeeded by Juan Lucero
