= Dello di Niccolò Delli =

Italian painter

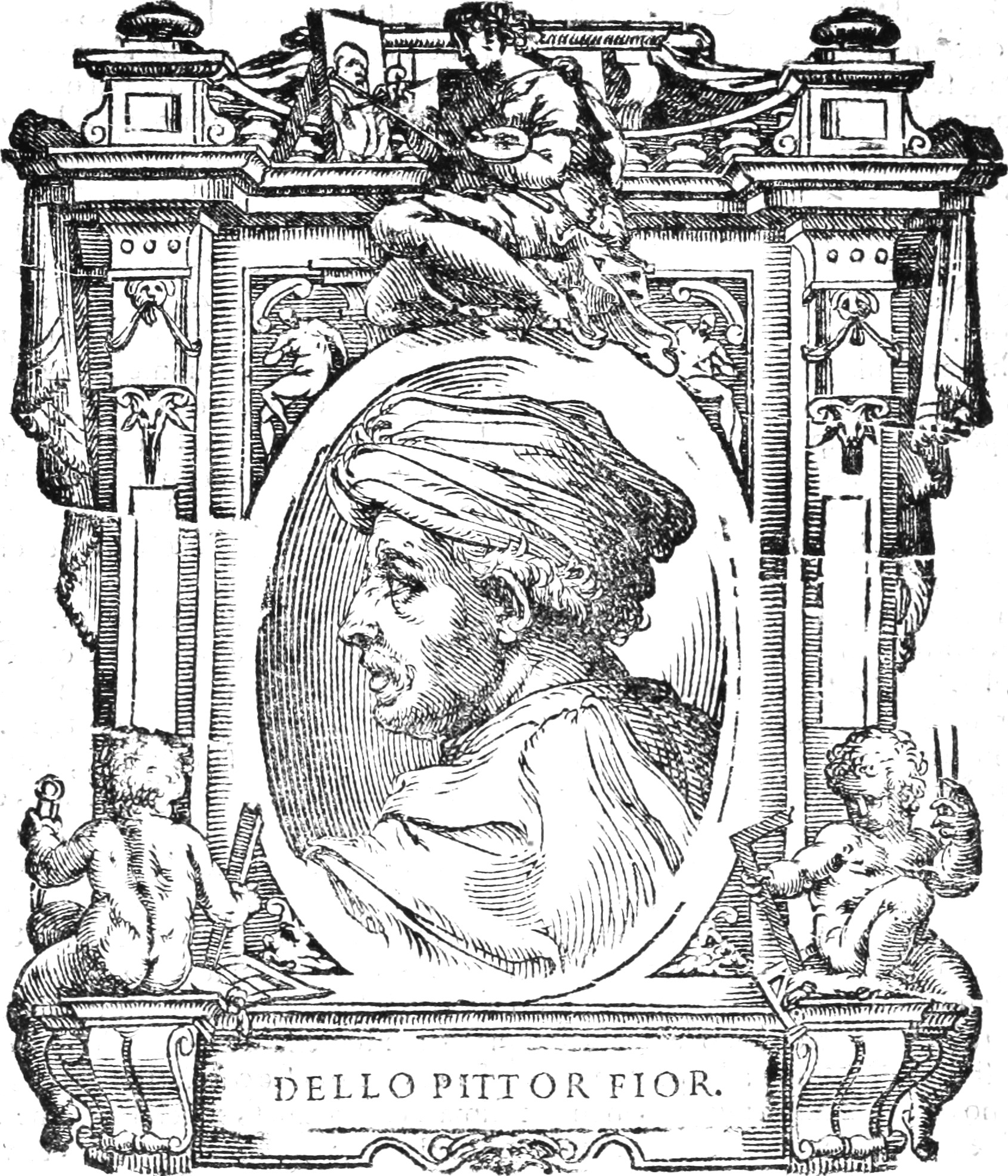
Illustration of Dello di Niccolò Delli from "Le Vite" by Giorgio Vasari

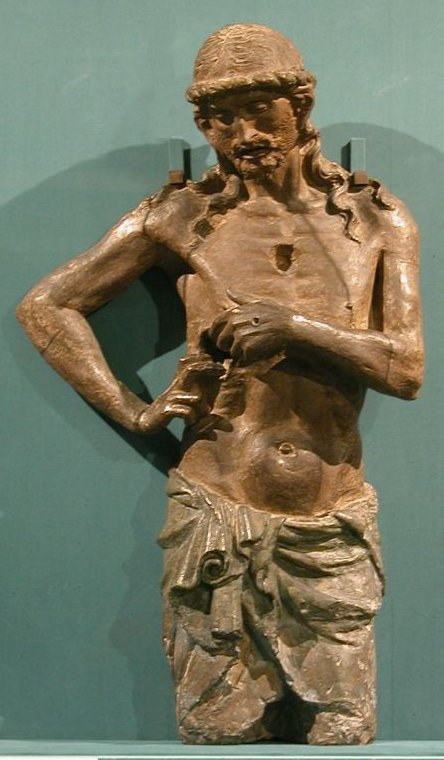
Christ, wooden sculpture by Dello di Niccolò Delli, 15th century

Dello di Niccolò Delli (c. 1403 – c. 1470), also known as Dello Delli, Dello di Niccolò and Dello, was an Italian sculptor and painter from Florence. His father was a tailor named Niccolò di Dello. Painters Nicola Delli and Sansone Delli were his less famous younger brothers.

In 1424, Niccolò Delli was sentenced to death for abandoning his post and fled to Siena with his family. In 1427, the family fled again―this time to Venice. From 1430 to 1433, Dello is known to have been in Florence. From 1433 to 1445 he lived in Spain, working in the Court of King John II of Castile, where he was knighted. His works include the apse cycle in the Old Cathedral of Salamanca. In 1446 he probably worked at Naples in Castel Nuovo.
