= Blasco of Portugal =

Blasco of Portugal (died 1353) was a Spanish clergyman who served as Bishop of Segovia between 1351 and 1353. He is considered to have been a native of the Kingdom of Portugal, judging by his surname, although there is no information about his affiliation.

He must have taken office on 30 May 1351, and the last news reported about his government in the diocese dates from 21 April 1353, when he authorized the transfer of many privileges granted to the city for centuries, and died that same year.
