= La Torre de Esteban Hambrán =

- Municipality
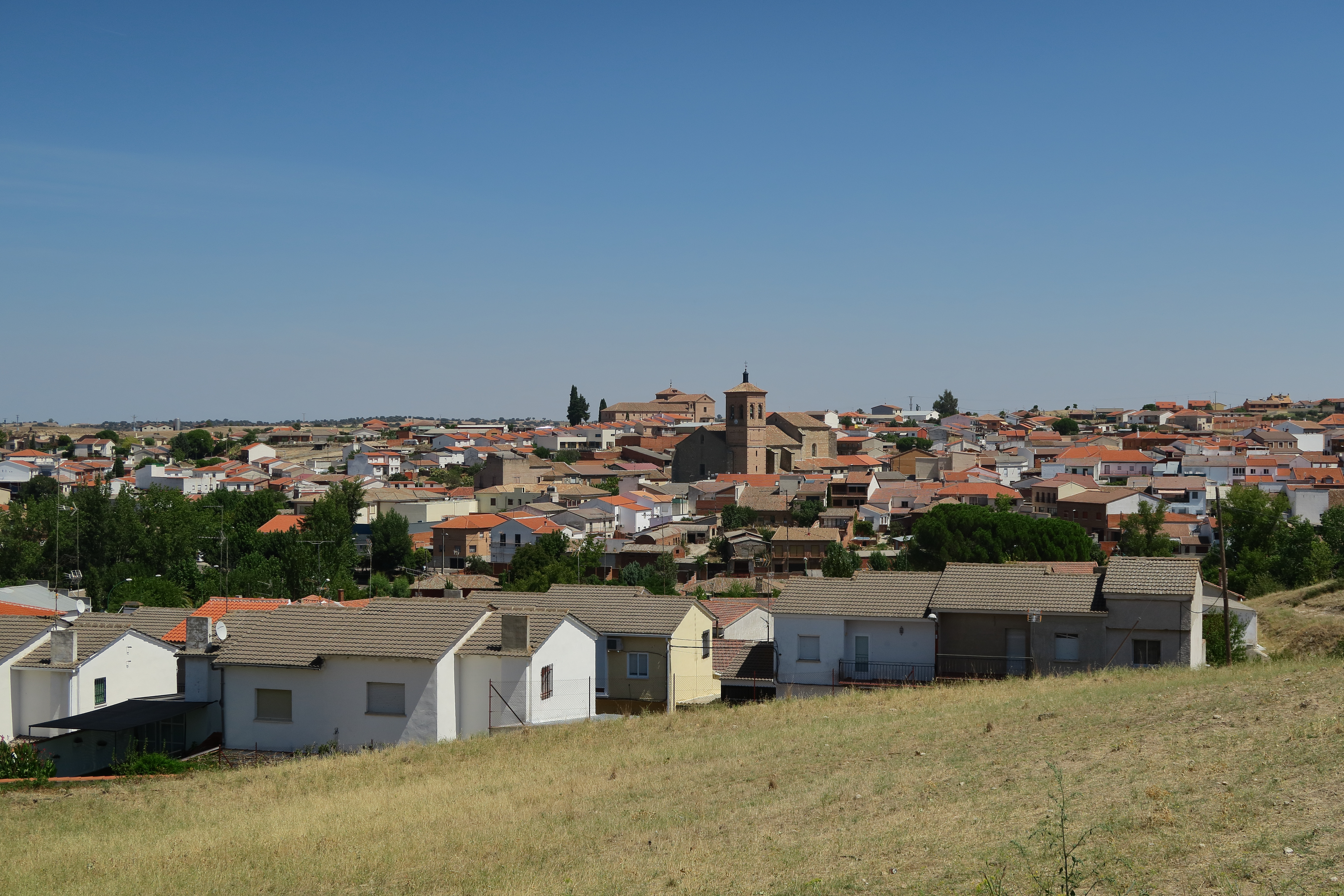

- Flag Coat of arms

- Location within Castilla-La Mancha Location within Spain
- Coordinates: 40°10′7″N 4°13′7″W
- Country: Spain
- Autonomous community: Castilla–La Mancha
- Province: Toledo

Area
  - Total: 51 km^{2} (20 sq mi)
- Elevation: 560 m (1,840 ft)

Population (2025-01-01)
  - Total: 1,946
  - Density: 38/km^{2} (99/sq mi)
- Demonym(s): Torreño, ña
- Time zone: UTC+1 (CET)
  - Summer (DST): UTC+2 (CEST)
- Postal code: 45920

La Torre de Esteban Hambrán is a Spanish municipality in the province of Toledo in Castilla–La Mancha.

== Origin of name ==
The village's name, which means "Tower of Esteban Hambrán" in English, may be derived from an old Muslim tower once belonging to a 12th-century Mozarab nobleman, Esteban ben Ambrán. The tower was used to communicate, by means of fire signals, with the distant Castle of Alamín.

== History ==
The town was founded by the Romans in 171 BC, but little is known about the Roman era of the village. After the Reconquista, the area around the "Esteban Hambrán" tower became populated. In the early 15th century, the land belonged to Pero López de Ayala. The village was bought in 1436 by Álvaro de Luna. When some years later John II of Castile confiscated the place, the village became crown property.

== Demography ==
The population was 1,756 in 2006.

== Monuments ==
- St. Anne's Chapel
- St. Rochus' Chapel
- St. Mary Magdalene's Parish Church
- St. John the Evangelist's Franciscan Convent
- Several fountains
- Funeral Catafalque
