= Lake Déllő =

Lake in Hungary

- Location within Hungary
- Coordinates: 46°54′41″N 19°41′23″E
- Basin countries: Hungary

Lake Déllő or Lake Dellő was the most significant stillwater in Kecskemét's city center. Now, the place is named after its maker: Gyenes Mihály
