= Juan Lucero (bishop) =

Spanish bishop (died 1362)

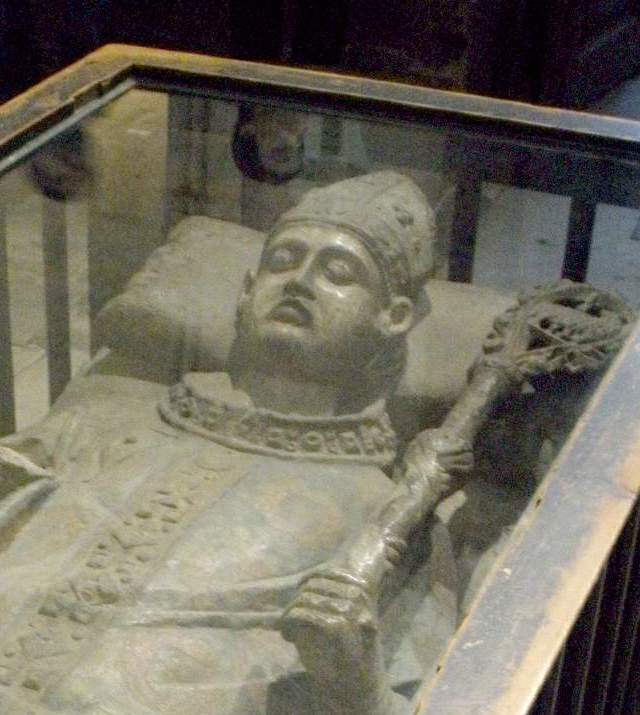
Tomb of Juan Lucero

Juan Lucero (died 1362 in Salamanca) was a Spanish bishop.

He is the son of María Lucero. Appointed as Bishop of Salamanca in November 1339, he accompanied Alfonso XI of Castile in the Siege of Algeciras in 1342, and together with the bishops of Badajoz and Zamora, he consecrated the mosque of Algeciras to Santa María de la Palma. Three years later, in 1345, he drafted the first statutes of the cathedral of Salamanca.

As Bishop of Salamanca, he officiated at the royal marriage between Peter I of Castile and Juana de Castro in the spring of 1354 in the church of San Martín de Cuéllar (Segovia), while his first wife, Blanche of Bourbon, was still alive. This earned him persecution from the papal legate. He governed the diocese of Salamanca until 18 June 1361, when he was appointed to the episcopal chair of Segovia. During his short term as Bishop of Segovia, he confirmed the feast of the Immaculate Conception in Segovia Cathedral.

Lucero died in Salamanca in 1362 and was buried in the chapel of Santa Bárbara, which he himself had founded in the cloister of the Old Cathedral of Salamanca, in the center of which his tomb is preserved.

Catholic Church titles
Preceded by Lorenzo y Rodrigo Díaz	Bishop of Salamanca; 1339–1361	Succeeded by Alfonso Barasaque
Preceded by Gonzalo II	Bishop of Segovia; 1361–1362	Succeeded by Martín de Cande
