= Alfonso Barasaque =

Alfonso Barasaque, or Alfonso Barrasa was Bishop of Salamanca from 1361 to 1382, and a trusted man of King Henry II of Castile. Some authors mistakenly mentioned him as Cardinal of Saint Eustatius.

On 12 August 1363, to assist in the completion of the Old Cathedral of Salamanca, he founded the Brotherhood of the Work of Saint Mary of the See, and sought to increase the alms given.

Catholic Church titles
| Preceded by Juan Lucero | Bishop of Salamanca; 1361–1382 | Succeeded by Alfonso II |
