= Água de Pena =

- Civil parish
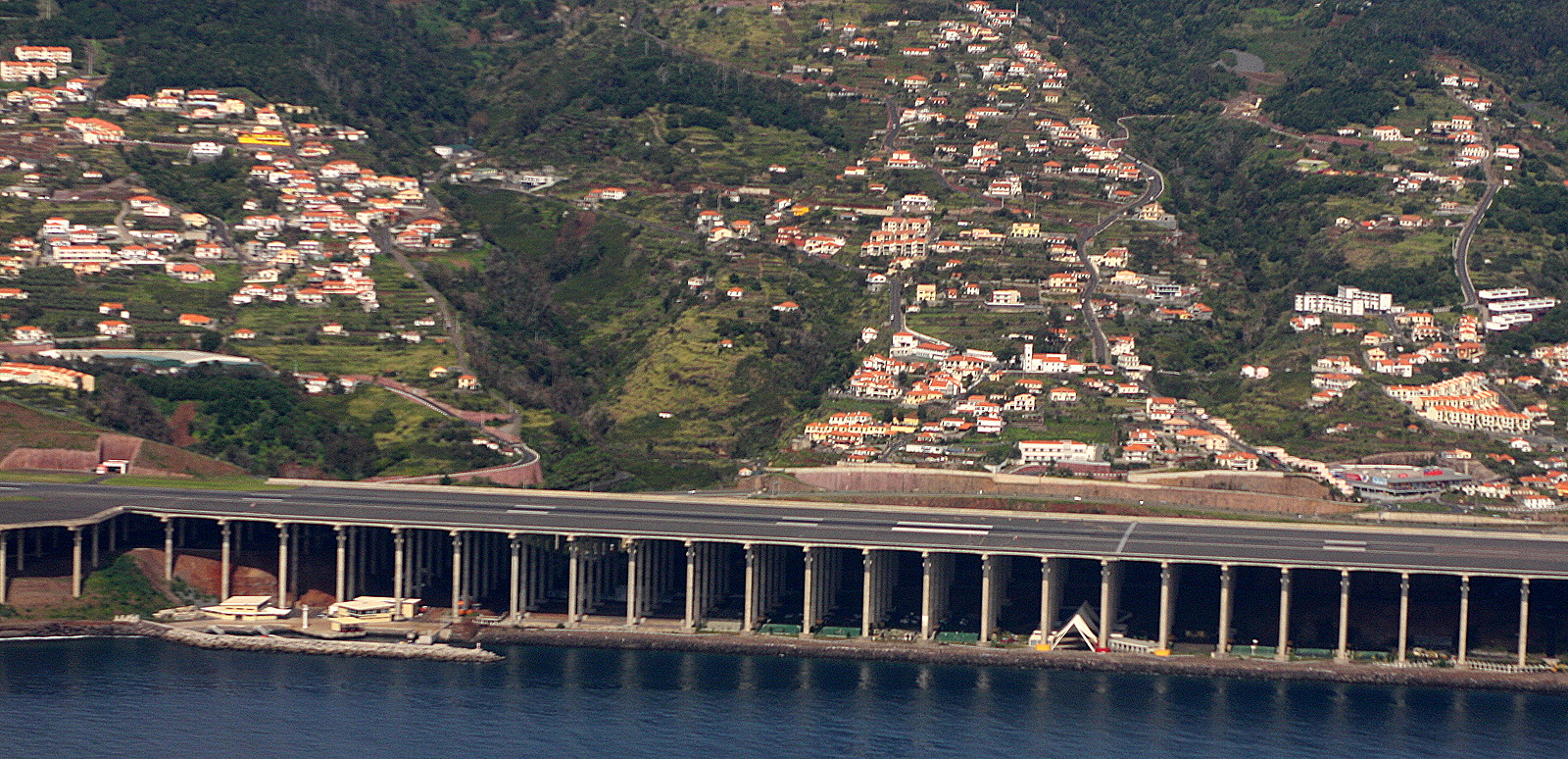
- Most of Água de Pena's coast is occupied by Madeira Airport

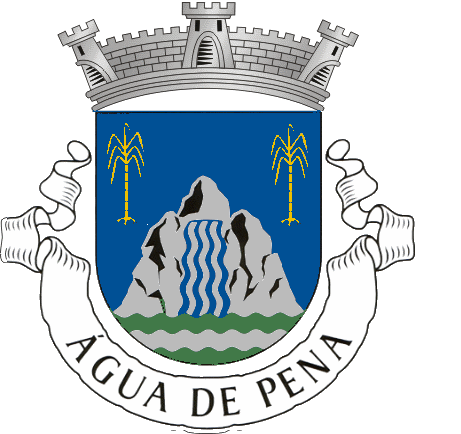
- Coat of arms

- Location in Madeira
- Coordinates: 32°40′41″N 16°46′55″W
- Country: Portugal
- Auton. region: Madeira
- Island: Madeira
- Municipality: Machico

Area
  - Total: 5.15 km^{2} (1.99 sq mi)
- Elevation: 359 m (1,178 ft)

Population (2011)
  - Total: 2,434
  - Density: 473/km^{2} (1,220/sq mi)
- Time zone: UTC+00:00 (WET)
  - Summer (DST): UTC+01:00 (WEST)
- Postal code: 9200-224
- Area code: 291
- Patron: Santa Beatriz
- Website: www.jf-aguadepena.pt

Água de Pena is a civil parish in the municipality of Machico on the south-east coast of the Portuguese island of Madeira. The population in 2011 was 2,434, in an area of 5.15 km².

== History ==
The area of Água de Pena was first sighted by the crew and explorers with João Gonçalves Zarco after he disembarked along the coastal spillway of Machico, likely around July 1419; the escarpment of Penedo overlook the beach of Machico, and the crew encamped in the shadow of the promontory overnight, before exploring the island the next day. Father Gaspar Frutuoso later recounted:

"And, the following day, running further ahead, always following the land, they found a fresh valley and warm pasture with a ravine of water, which fell to the sea with much freshness. There he made some men, who went to find another spring, that exited a large, old and smooth pebble, and was so precious and cold, that he ordered a flask filled in order to take to the Infante; and because of this port (wherein he found the same), the Port of the Pebble, which is today called, became the small port's lands that constituted the future parish of Água de Pena."

It was this second parish that made the discoverers call port on this ignored island. The Porto do Seixo was written into the history of the discoveries as the first locality visited by the discoverers on the second day of their exploration along the coast. But, it is unclear the origin of the parish's name; there are various hypothesises. Some indicate that the primitive name was actually Água de Penha and not Pena: a common mistake/corruption during the era. The use of penha (English: rock) is a better translation for the description recounted by Frutuoso, since the story indicated that the water sprang from a pebble or rock. A similar tale from the parishes early history also recounts that the parish's name "...was derived from a crystalline spring on the abandoned lands of Henrique Teixeira, who had many lands to the west of the village of Machico". Similarly, pena is the Portuguese word for feather, but it is also the Portuguese term for the moulding surfaces of an anvil (Portuguese: parte espalmada da bigorna), which was also inferred from the promontory on which the parish was built, which is also like an anvil (Portuguese: bignora).

The ecclesiastical parish, since its early settlement, has been referred to as Água de Pena (1560), supported by older documents to that effect. Henrique Teixeira, second son of Tristão Vaz Teixeira, one of the Madeira's discoverers and first Captain-donatário of Machico, had many lands "linked with agriculture and for this reason was very wealthy, ennobling the village of Machico with many sugar cane machinery, as well as sugar cane fields, cattle and bread, and assemblies that he ordered cut and take advantage...". A historical genealogy of the Teixeiras, notes that Hirão Teixeira, grandson of Henrique Teixeira, settled, lived and died in Água de Pena, before being buried in the Chapel of Conceição in Machico (1551).

Either in a pre-existent chapel, or one that was constructed, the new parish began function around 1561, under its first pastor, Father Tomé Gomes. The annual stipend for its clergy was a meager 9000 réis in 1572, and increased by 3000 réis ib 14 December 1588. By 5 February 1592, royal records indicated the annual salary was 19,000 réis, one moio (60 alqueires) and one pipa (500 kilograms) of wine. Other documents from the historical ombudsman of the archipelago, per mandate of the Council of Trade (13 March 1694) ordered the spending of 651,000 réis on expenses associated with quarrying rock and carpentry on the new church, and a secondary receipt for 4000000 réis for similar expenses to build the church in an area that was more "convenient and less windy" (2 April 1745). Local historians assume that the 1694 mandate was never executed, and that the 1745 expenses were actually a response to damages suffered in the 50-year span. The commercial businesses associated with the parish accounted for 3000 réis worth of income (15 June 1598).

The principal vicar and governor, Bishop António Alfredo de Santa Catarina Braga, sent out a proclamation on 13 June 1836, to extinguishing the independent parish of Água de Pena and incorporating into grand parish of Santo da Serra e Água de Pena, with its seat in Água de Pena. This was an arbitrary and capriciousness act: Santo da Serra was a subsidiary of the parish of Machico (created in 1813), but the clergy did not reside in the parish, the annexation of Água de Pena to Santo da Serra, allowed the vicar to have residency in the appropriate parish. This did not last long, per law established on 24 June 1848, the old parish was re-established, but losing the locality of Achada do Barro (which became part of Santo da Serra) and gaining Torre and Ventrecha (which belonged to the parish of Santa Cruz).

In the past, its ocean-front position was served by a small port, with a rock/pebble beach (Calhau do Seixo), situated near the mouth of the ravine of the same name (Ribeira do Seixo). In 1995, owing to the lengthening of the airport in Santa Catarina, the Calhau do Seixo was destroyed in order to construct a dyke to allow the construction of massive support pillars for the remodelled Madeira Airport.

== Geography ==
Penned in by the parishes of Santa Cruz and Machico, Água da Pena was limited to the north by Machico and Santo da Serra, to the south by Santa Cruz, east by the Atlantic Ocean and west by Santa Cruz and Santo da Serra. It was originally divided between the municipalities of Santa Cruz and Machico: sections of Torre and Ventrecha (in Santa Cruz) and Bemposta, Lombo, Lugarinho, Igreja and Queimada in (Machico), until 1989. Thereafter, the parish of Água de Pena became an independent civil parish of Machico, being de-annexed from portions of Torre and Ventrecha (which were incorporated into the parish of Santa Cruz).

It is approximately 2 kilometres from either villages of Santa Cruz and Machico (the central part of the parish is equidistant from both), while it is 20 kilometres from the regional capital, Funchal.

The lands in the parish are irrigated by levadas (English: manmade water transport canals), including the Levadas do Moinho da Serra (which come from Santa Cruz), Levada Nova (which is diverted from the Ribeira do Machico, and the Levada do Lugarinho (whose course flows south from the place of the same name).

== Economy ==
Its primary sector, both figuratively and economically, continues to be the agricultural sector, and the regions historical connection to the cultivation of sugar cane. In addition, banana, potato and sweet potato are annually harvested from the fields of Água de Pena. The secondary sector, revolves around tertiary activities, such as civil construction, restaurateurs, bakery shops, hospitality and automobile sales/service (repair and sale).

== Architecture ==
=== Civic ===
- Miradouro Camões Pequeno (English: Camões Pequeno Belvedere);
- Fonte do Seixo (English: Seixo Fountain/Spring;

=== Religious ===
- Chapel of the Sagrado Coração de Jesus (English: Sacred Heart of Jesus) - located in the locality of Cardais, it was founded in 1907, by brother Henrique Modesto de Betencourt;
- Chapel of Nossa Senhora do Perpétuo Socorro (English: Our Lady of the Perpetual Help/Aid) - constructed by Francisco de Freitas Correia in 1924, in the area of Queimada.

== Notable citizens ==
- Francisco Fulgêncio de Andrade (Água de Pena, Madeira; 20 February 1889 – Funchal, Madeira; 27 July 1970) - canon, teacher, journalist and commentator; he originally studied at the diocese seminary in Funchal, before attending the Pontifical Gregorian University in Rome, studying philosophy and theology (1914), before being ordained presbyter on 19 December 1914. He returned to Funchal in 1916, where he taught theology at the seminary in Funchal from 1917, later becoming parish priest in Faial (1922) and São Jorge (1923), before returning to Funchal to continue his teaching career in the humanities and theology (a role he would occupy until the end of his life). In 1928 he was nominated to the college of bishops in Funchal, while canon at the Sé Cathedral, exercising roles in the Acção Católica, membership in the Brotherhood of the Santa Casa da Misericórdia (Portuguese: Irmandade da Santa Casa da Misericórdia), as religious assistant to the older Asilo dos Velhinhos (English: Seniors Asylum) in Santa Clara, with weekly sermons throughout the churches/chapels of Funchal and participation in many cultural and religious movements within the Diocese. He was a journalist, for many years, writing for the Jornal da Madeira (chronicles and editorials), and became a religious commentator on Funchal Radio, with his own program on Sundays, entitled Cinco minutos de espiritualidade (English: Five Minutes of Spirituality).
