= Ilhéu do Farol =

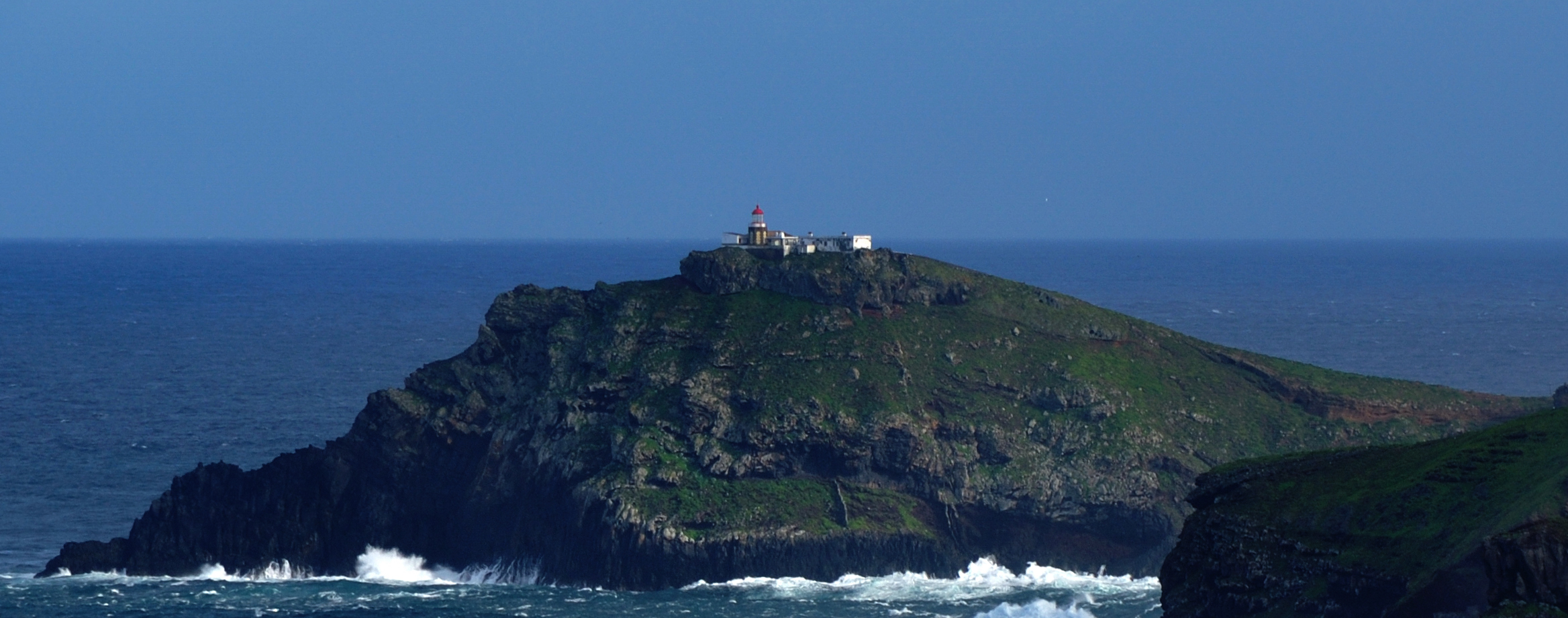
- Ilhéu do Farol and its lighthouse

- Location of the islet inside the Island of Madeira

Geography
- Location: Atlantic Ocean
- Coordinates: 32.729°N 16.658°W
- Area: 0.115 km^{2} (0.044 sq mi)
- Highest elevation: 107 m (351 ft)

Administration
- Portugal
- Autonomous Region: Madeira
- Municipality: Machico
- Freguesia: Caniçal

Demographics
- Population: 0

Ilhéu do Farol (also: Ilhéu da Ponta de São Lourenço) is an uninhabited islet off the easternmost point of Madeira Island, Portugal. It is part of the municipality of Machico. The islet lies adjacent to the east of the larger Ilhéu da Cevada, which lies directly east of the rocky peninsula Ponta de São Lourenço. Its area is 11.5 ha (28 acres). The islet is 107 meters high. A lighthouse stands at the eastern extremity of the island. The islet is part of the protected area Reserva Natural da Ponta de São Lourenço.
