= Santo António da Serra =

Santo António da Serra may refer to the following places in Madeira, Portugal:

- Santo António da Serra (Machico), a parish in the municipality of Machico
- Santo António da Serra (Santa Cruz), a parish in the municipality of Santa Cruz
