= António Sebastião Spínola =

António Sebastião Spínola (Machico, Porto da Cruz, 13 July 1875 – Machico, Porto da Cruz, 19 March 1956) was an Inspector General of Finances and Chief of Cabinet of the Finance Minister Professor Oliveira Salazar and afterwards of Finance Minister Professor João Pinto da Costa Leite, 4th Conde de Lumbrales, Councilor and Administrator of the Fundação da Casa de Bragança, etc.

He was the son and oldest child of António Sebastião Spínola (Machico, Porto da Cruz, 2 March 1845 - ?), a landowner in the Island of Madeira, and Maria José da Silva (Machico, Porto da Cruz, 18 October 1854 - ?). (m. Machico, Porto da Cruz, 18 May 1874)

He married firstly in Funchal, São Pedro, on 6 September 1902 to Maria Gabriela Alves Ribeiro (Funchal, São Pedro, 14 June 1884 - ?), daughter of Francisco Antonio Rivera y Amigo (Galicia, Pontevedra, Pontevedra, Santiago de Covelo, 1855 - ?), a Galician merchant in Funchal, and (m. Funchal, Sé, 20 November 1880) Virgínia Alves (Funchal, Sé, 1860 - ?). They had four children:

- Maria Emília Ribeiro Spínola (1905 Estremoz, Santo André - August 1906 at age 16 months)
- António Sebastião Ribeiro Spínola (1910–1996), Portuguese President of the Republic
- Francisco Ribeiro Spínola (Almada, 16 August 1912 – Lisbon, 1994), married to Corina Flores Cabeça (Beja, 2 December 1916 –), from a branch of the Cabeça de Vaca family of Extremadura, and had issue
- Gabriela Ribeiro Spínola, who died a child

He married secondly Alice de Lemos de Araújo, without issue.

== Sources ==
- Fotobiografias do Século XX, Photobiography of António de Spínola, Círculo de Leitores.
