= Praia de Machico =

Beach in Machico, Madeira, Portugal

- Beach
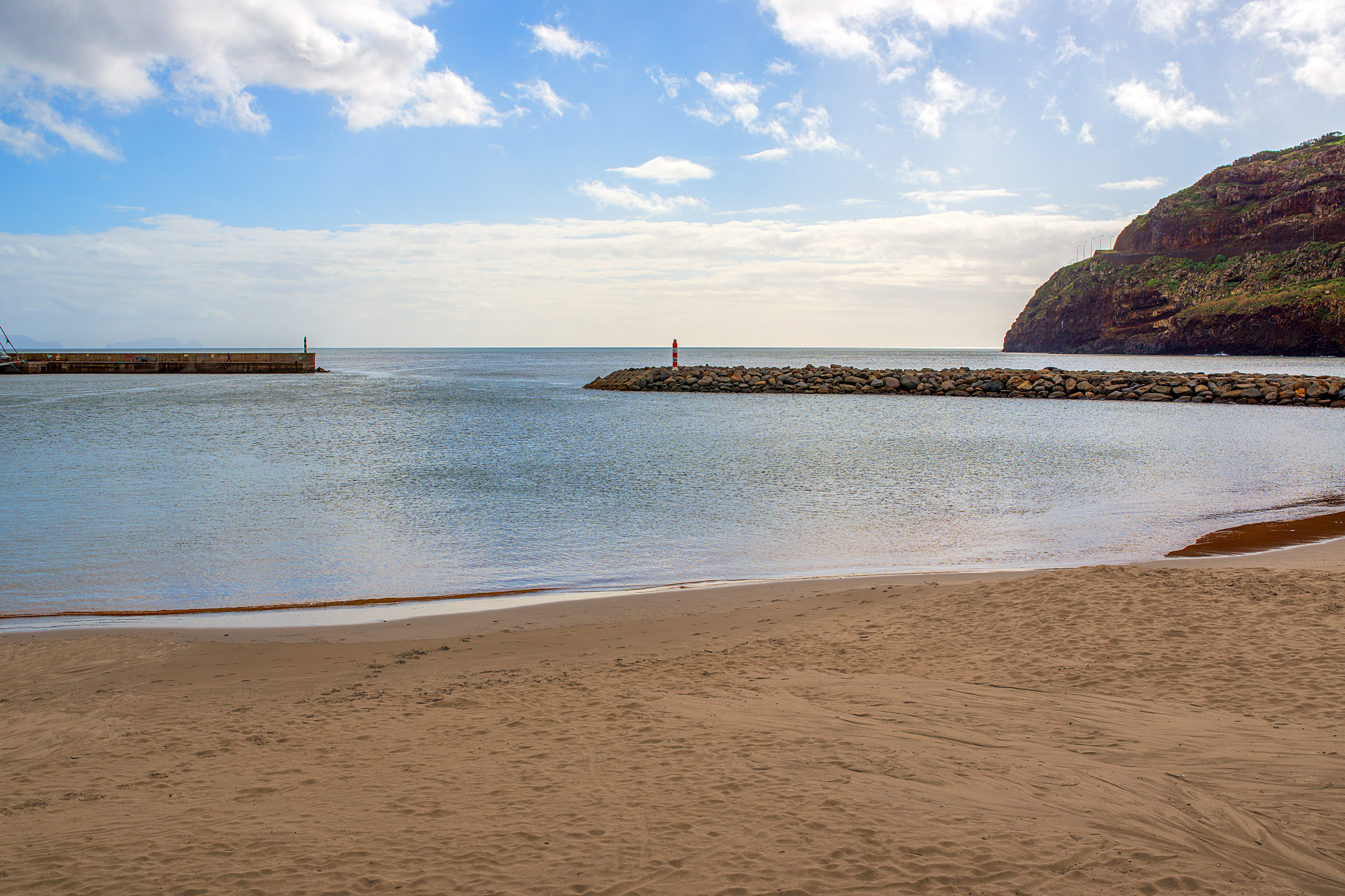
- The man made coastal beach of Machico.

- Coordinates: 32°43′07″N 16°45′44″W
- Location: Machico, Madeira, Portugal

Dimensions
  - Length: 125 m

Praia de Machico (English: Machico Beach) is a beach located near the town Machico, on the island of Madeira, Portugal.

It is one of the few sandy beaches of Madeira, with sand imported from North Africa. However, these sand-imports were quite controversial, as the sand was taken from Western Sahara, a Non-Self Governing Territory which has been largely occupied by Morocco since 1975. The imports are considered to be a violation of international law, as the consent of the people of the territory is required in the exploitation of the territory's resources.
