= São Vicente Caves =

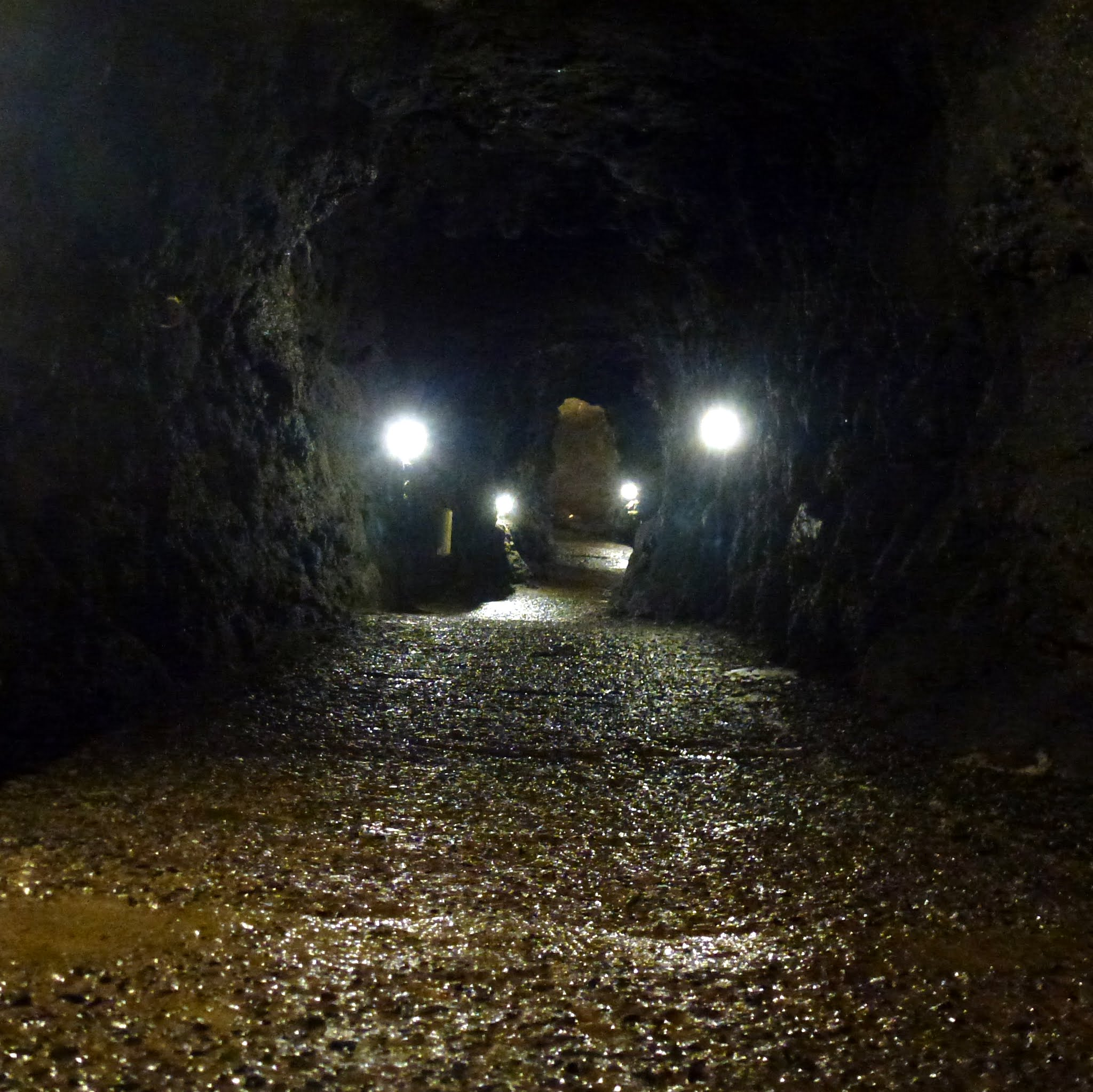
- São Vicente Caves

- Location within Madeira
- Location: São Vicente, Madeira
- Coordinates: 32°47′51.8″N 17°02′33.2″W
- Depth: 40 metres (130 ft)
- Length: 1,000 metres (3,300 ft)
- Discovery: 1885
- Geology: Lava tube, Basalt
- Entrances: 1
- Difficulty: Easy to Difficult
- Hazards: Varied
- Access: Closed since March 2020
- Features: Stalactites, Stalagmites
- Translation: Grutas de São Vicente (Portuguese)

The São Vicente Caves (Grutas de São Vicente in Portuguese) are caves located in the parish and county of São Vicente, Madeira. Entrance is charged at €8 for adults, but have been closed since March 2020.

== History ==
These caves were formed around 890,000 years ago from a volcanic eruption in Paul da Serra that ran down to the sea. Thus, the outside, exposed to lower temperatures solidified rapidly while the inner liquid continued to run with many gases, forming a series of lava tubes, which today constitute the caves of São Vicente.

They were first discovered in 1885, by local people who informed James Yate Johnson an English naturalist in Madeira who explored the caves further.

The caves were opened to the public on 1 of October 1996, being one of the first caves of volcanic origins to be opened to the public in Portugal.

== See also ==
- Furnas do Cavalum
