= Caniçal =

- Civil parish
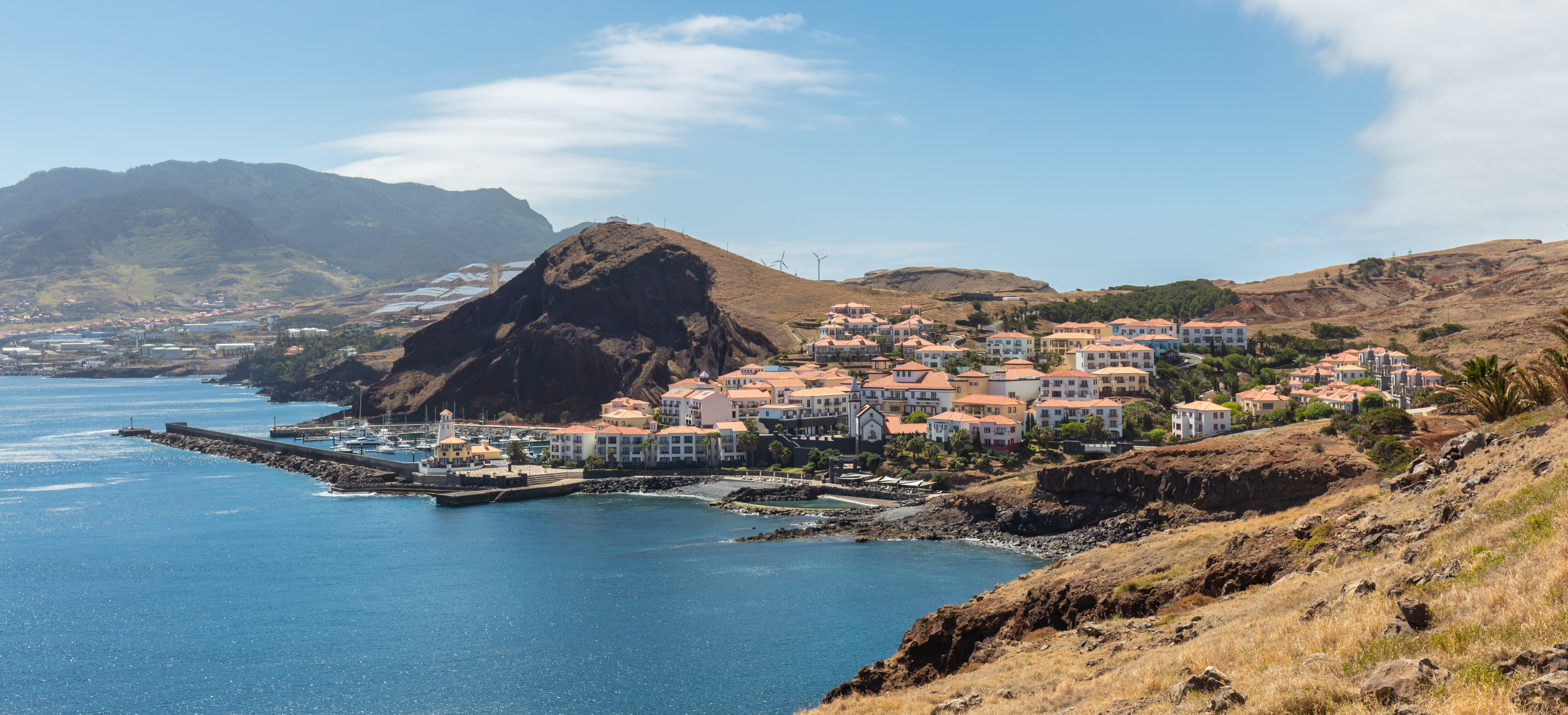
- View of Caniçal

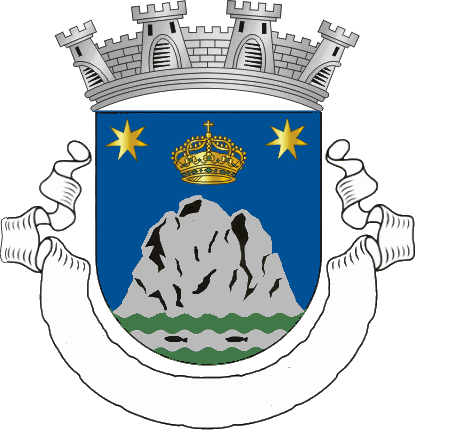
- Coat of arms

- Location in Madeira
- Coordinates: 32°44′27″N 16°42′42″W
- Country: Portugal
- Auton. region: Madeira
- Island: Madeira
- Municipality: Machico
- Established: Settlement: 5 September 1489; Parish: c. 1561

Area
  - Total: 11.85 km^{2} (4.58 sq mi)
- Elevation: 4 m (13 ft)

Population (2011)
  - Total: 3,924
  - Density: 331.1/km^{2} (857.6/sq mi)
- Time zone: UTC+00:00 (WET)
  - Summer (DST): UTC+01:00 (WEST)
- Postal code: 9200-032
- Area code: 291
- Patron: São Sebastião
- Website: www.freguesiadocanical.pt

Caniçal (Portuguese pronunciation: [kɐniˈsal]) is a civil parish in the municipality of Machico in the Portuguese island of Madeira. The population in 2011 was 3,924, in an area of 11.85 km^{2}. Equidistant from Funchal and Santana (20 km), the community is connected to these centres by the Regional 109 roadway. Caniçal is now the principal cargo port in Madeira. Living in this parish is a 109-year-old man as of March 7, 2021.

== History ==
Early documents of the lands of Caniçal came from references to the region's use as a hunting preserve of rich landowners; the lands where the hereditary donation to the sons of the first Captain-donatário of Machico. Gaspar Frutuoso in Saudades da Terra, mentions Caniçal in these terms:

“...it was [an area] of a lot of hunting of rabbit, partridge, peacocks and many wild boar, that one affirms that it was the best hunting lands in all of Portugal. There was no lack of water in those lands, that during early settlement, in order to irrigate the sugar cane in this village (Machico) and for Caniçal, that the levada created from where it sprung to the village, was four and a half leagues..." These wild lands were peppered with toponymic references to its use as hunting grounds or natural regions: Dragoal or Serrado dos Marmeleiros, for example.

The first area to be inhabited was the south-central coast of Caniçal, at the edge of the Ponta de São Lourenço. In those lands, which were donated to Vasco Moniz (the son of Tristão Vaz Teixeira), the first of the oldest farms were established (5 September 1489).

It was not the importance of its community or level of development that justified the creation of the first chapel in Caniçal: its distance, number of people (ten couples) and difficulties in communication, justified the construction by regal charter on 25 August 1527. Even by 1561, when the parish was established, the community only included consisted of fifteen couples. The Chapel of São Sebastião, founded by Garcia Moniz in the first quarter of the 16th century, became the parish seat. It was actually constructed in the area of Igreja Velha where the older temple was destroyed by pirates. In 1594, the chapel was remodelled or reconstructed, but was once again destroyed during the 1748 earthquake, requiring the founding of a new church. In the 16th century, the primitive chapel of Nossa Senhora da Piedade was constructed by local fishermen who had promised to erect a chapel in the name of the Santissima Virgem, after a group were saved from death by divine intervention. These votes of thanksgiving were also supported by an annual procession (around September), in the name of Nossa Senhora dos Pescadores, which at times included a flotilla of boats As the community expanded further west, the parish built the new Church, around 1749.

It was during the mid-1700s that the Marquess of Pombal projected and ordered construction of military port and arsenal, in the area known as Abra. The fishing community was susceptible to pirate attacks, mostly from the Barbary Coast, and the construction of a small coastal fort to watch for approaching corsairs, especially from Ponta de São. Lourenço. Pirate attacks in the Atlantic islands (Azores and Madeira) were common: the area known as Três Donzelas was known orally as the site of a typical experience for the period, where three youth were kidnapped by the raiders. In the year of the 1861, this parish did not register any death amongst its people.

== Geography ==
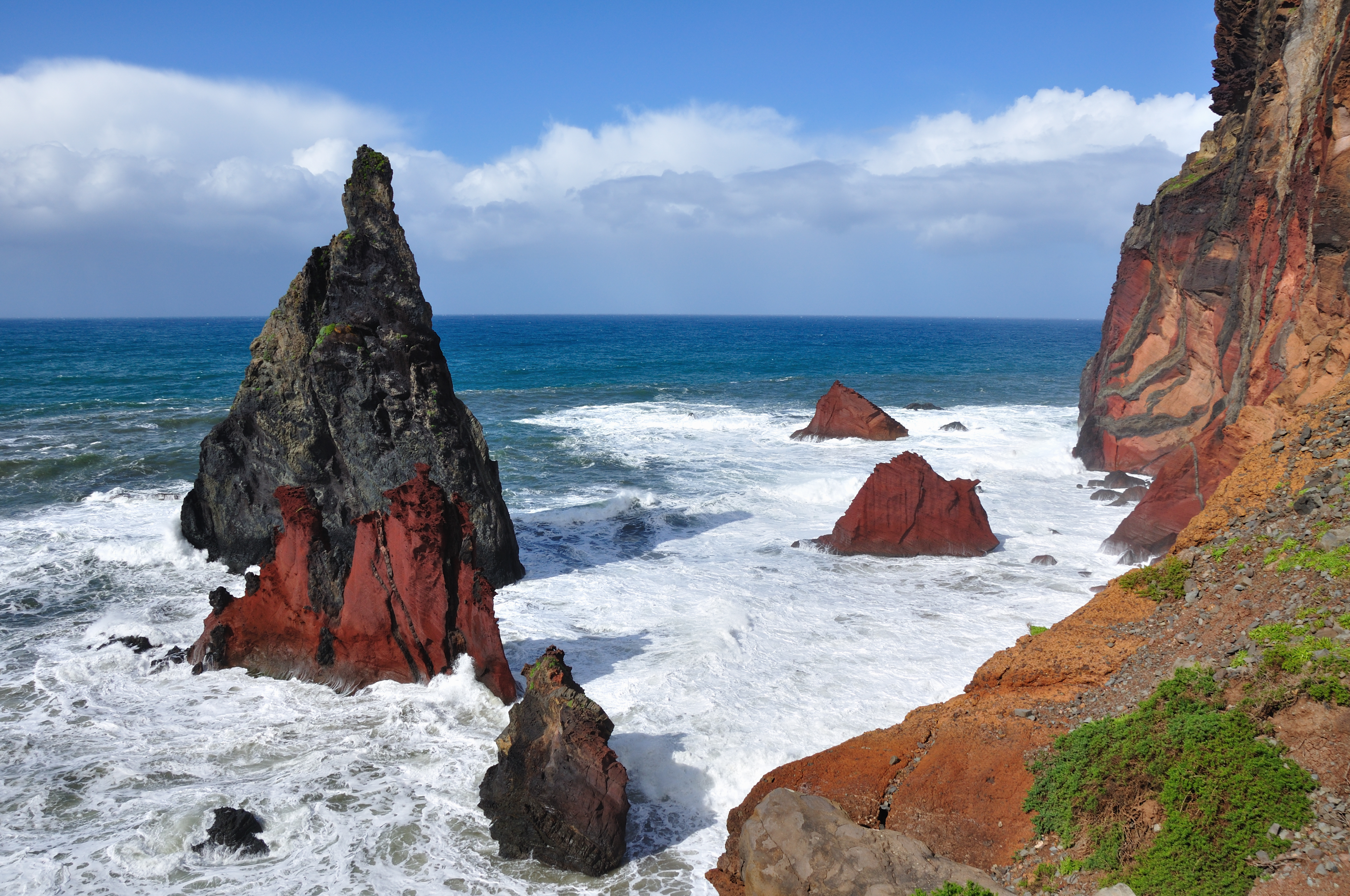
Islets in rough seas on the north coast of Ponta de São Lourenço

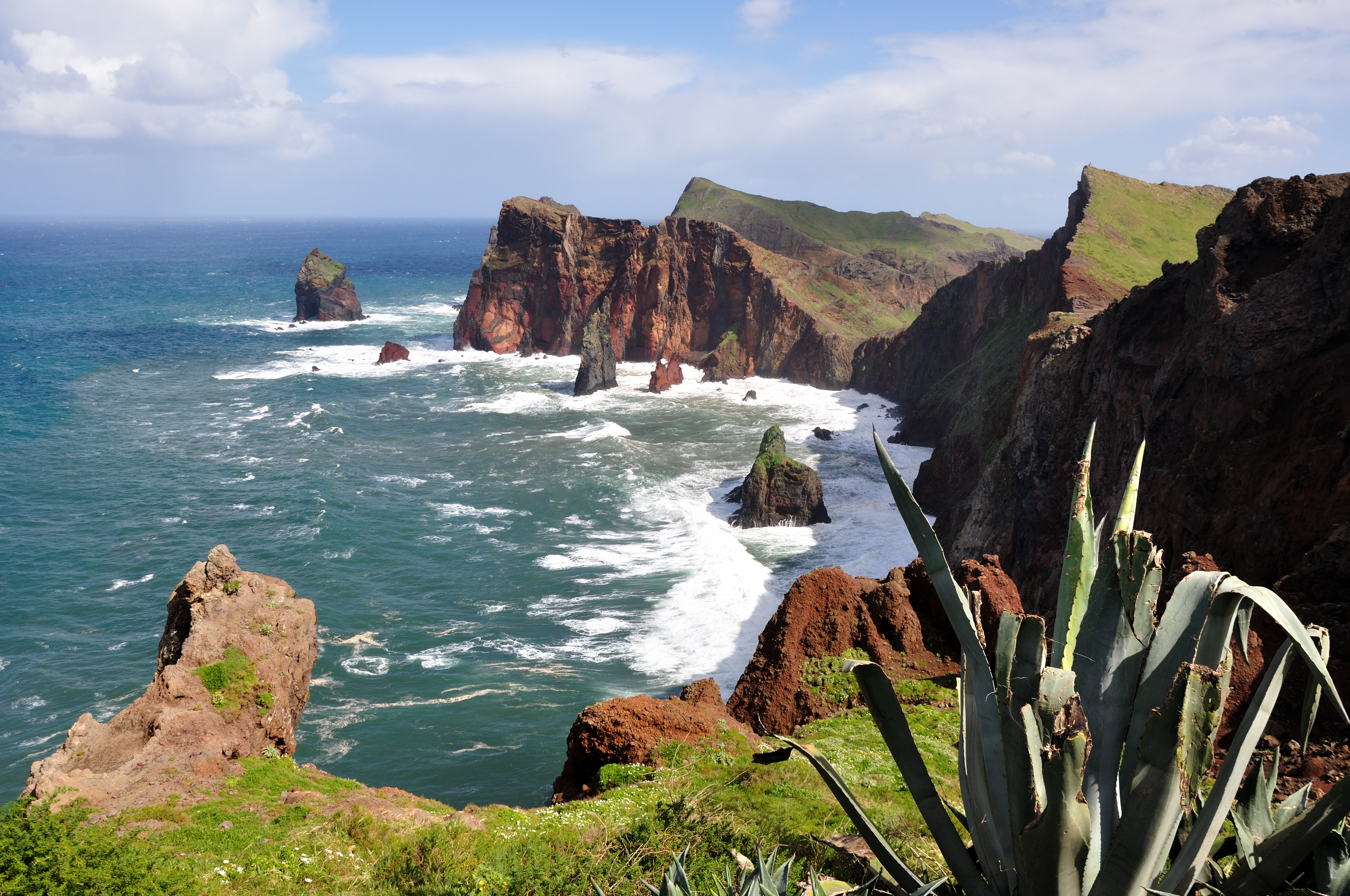
The arm of Ponta de São Lourenço along the northern coast of Caniçal

Caniçal borders the municipal seat of Machico on its western frontier, and is surrounded by the Atlantic Ocean on the remaining borders. The roughly escarped terrain is prominent in the western border, where altitudes reach 800 metres above sea level and ravines are semi-active or dry year round. The urbanized and residential lands are located in a semi-gently sloping central area, while to the eastern coast, the land extends into a long narrow isthmus at Ponta de São Lourenço. Although most of the mountainous western region is forested, most of the remaining areas of the parish are populated with smaller species of herbaceous bushes, trees and pasturelands, until the Ponta de São Lourenço where vegetation is limited to sparse low-lying grasses.

== Economy ==
Its main industry has been agriculture and fishing.

During the decade to 2006 the port of Caniçal was extensively developed to become the principal cargo port for Madeira, with new facilities for containers, bulk shipping and fishing. In 2007 cargo shipping operations at Funchal ended, and the remaining trade transferred to Caniçal. The 100-120m self-unloading transinsular (Mares Lusos) containerships Insular, Ponta do Sol and Monte Brasil make stops here on their route to Lisbon. The 134m containership John Lucas Dede stops here after Leixões, Rotterdam and Hamburg. The 108m bulk carrier Islas Dos calls here regularly, as does the 229m fuel carrier Boavista from Lisbon. A lifeboat service is provided by the Salvador do Mar.

== Sport ==
The main football club is CF Caniçal who are currently playing in the Portuguese Second Division.
