= Furnas do Cavalum =

Cave in Madeira, Portugal

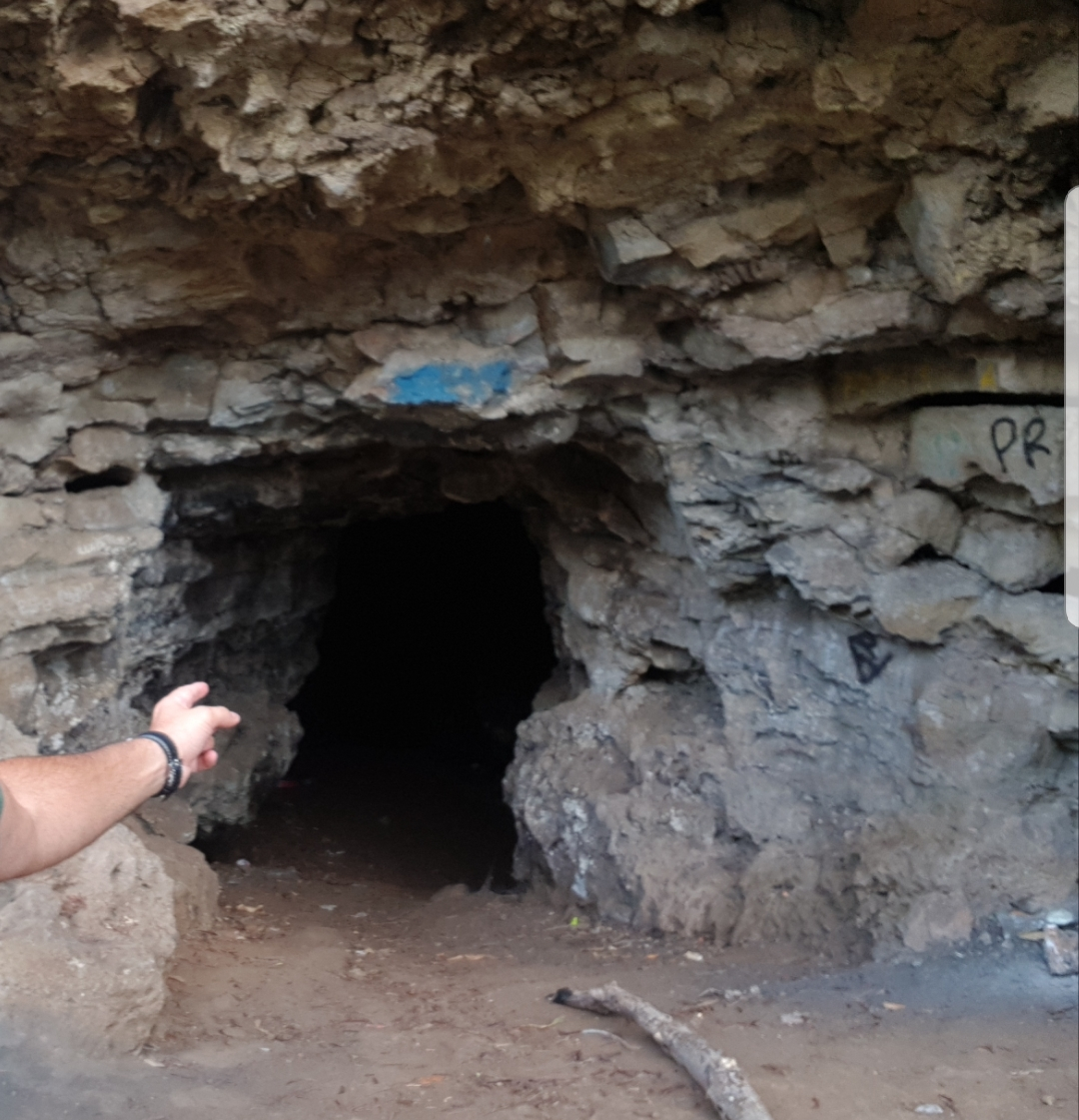
- Furnas do Cavalum

- Location within Madeira
- Location: Machico, Madeira
- Coordinates: 32°43′56.3″N 16°47′2.8″W
- Geology: Basalt
- Entrances: 4
- Access: Public
- Lighting: No

The Furnas do Cavalum (Caves of Cavalum in English) are a group of four caves located in Machico, Madeira. Named after a local legend about a demon called Cavalum, who was imprisoned in the cave.

These lava tubes are of great importance allowing a view on the volcanic history of the now inactive island of Madeira, they have also biologic importance as there are several troglobionts living in the cave, including crustaceans, spiders and flies. At least fourteen invertebrates live in these tubes and at least three of them are endemic on Madeira island, one of them exists only in this cave.

Furnas do Cavalum are also part of the cultural heritage of the islanders, as numerous legends are told about the caves. Despite the stories about the demon, the cave was used as a refuge by the locals, namely during violent uprisings like the Revolta da Madeira in April 1931.

== See also ==
- São Vicente Caves
