= Santo António da Serra (Machico) =

- Civil parish
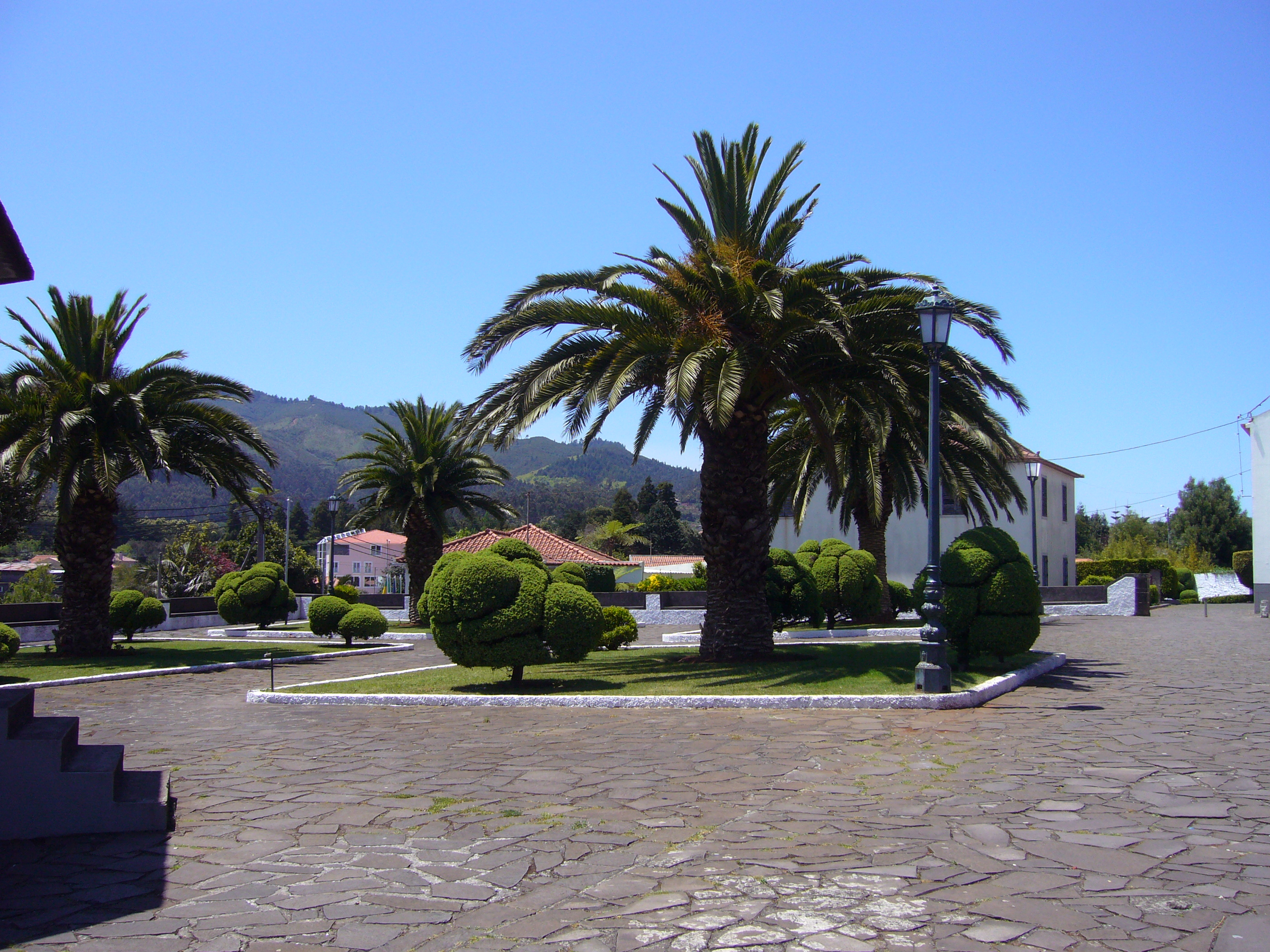
- The principal square of the village of Santo António da Serra

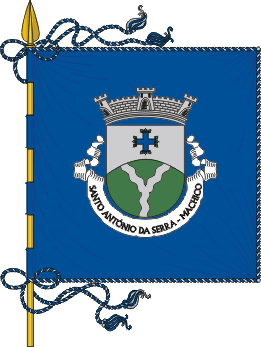
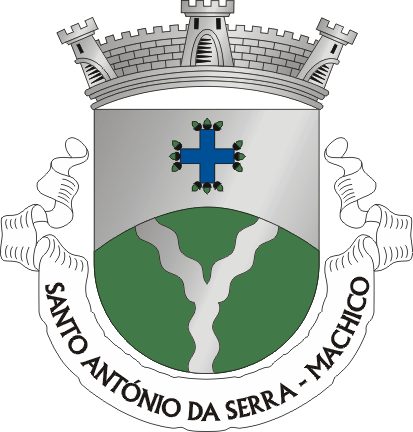
- Flag Coat of arms

- Location in Madeira
- Coordinates: 32°44′5″N 16°49′35″W
- Country: Portugal
- Auton. region: Madeira
- Island: Madeira
- Municipality: Machico

Area
  - Total: 8.62 km^{2} (3.33 sq mi)
- Elevation: 568 m (1,864 ft)

Population (2011)
  - Total: 1,617
  - Density: 188/km^{2} (486/sq mi)
- Time zone: UTC+00:00 (WET)
  - Summer (DST): UTC+01:00 (WEST)
- Area code: 291
- Patron: Santo António

Santo António da Serra (Portuguese: Saint Anthony of the mountain) is a civil parish in the interior of the municipality of Machico, on the island of Madeira. The parish is adjacent to another parish in the neighbouring municipality of Santa Cruz to the south, which is also named Santo António da Serra. The population in 2011 was 1,617, in an area of 8.62 km^{2}.

== History ==
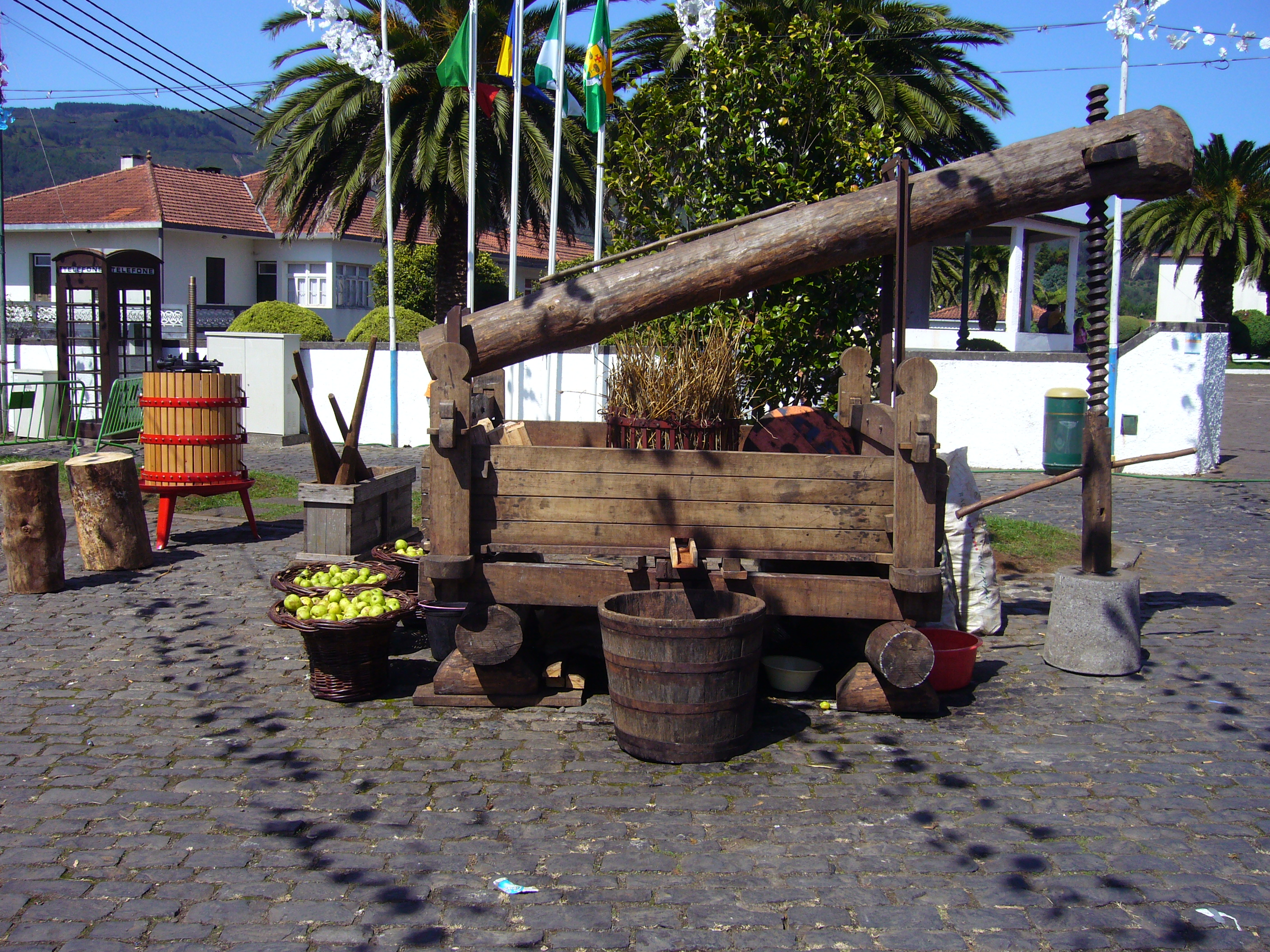
Historical implements seen at the Apple Festival in Santo da Serra

The parish name originated from the local adoration of Saint Anthony, and the name usually shortened to Santo da Serra in conversation.

Settlement of this region happened late, owing to most settlers' preference for coastal lands rather than the rugged interior. It is likely to have occurred during the 16th century, beginning in the area of the parochial church, and progressed to a point where Gil de Carvalho ordered the construction of two chapels for the resident population. During this century, a primitive temple located on the site of the main church existed, under the jurisdiction of the vicar of Machico. After the 17th century, a dispute arose between the vicars of Machico, Santa Cruz and Água de Pena over their jurisdictions: consequently the Bishop of Funchal, Lourenço de Távora, in order to resolve the dispute, took the chapel (and its associated lands) under his protection, and therefore, episcopal jurisdiction (which it continues to fall, under the Mitra do Funchal).

The bishopric governor, António Alfredo de Santa Catarina, in 1836, annexed the parish of Água de Pena to Santo da Serra, transferring the ecclesiastical seat to the latter, under the parish of Santo da Serra e de Água de Pena. But, Santo da Serra was eventually restored by regal charter in 1848, taking with it the locality of Achada do Barro, and making it an autonomous parish of Machico.

In 1852, certain areas of the municipality Machico, specifically lands in Santo da Serra, were annexed to the municipality of Santa Cruz, provoking protests. Under the initiative of the Sectary General of the District, António Lopes Barbosa de Albuquerque, who reunited the respective representatives of the "warring" groups at Casa dos Romeiros in Santo da Serra, where an accord was brokered that divided Santo da Serra between the two municipalities of Machico and Santa Cruz.

During the reign of Queen Maria I, the monarch established lands to be used for the inhabitants of Porto Santo: these tracts were to be distributed freely to those who wanted to leave the island. This followed an economic crisis on the island in the 18th century, putting many in a state of poverty and malnutrition. By regal decree, dated 18 December 1768, the lands were referred to as the Aldeia da Rainha (English: village/hamlet of the Queen), and many tried to adapt to the new environment. But, the climate (both humid and cold) forced many to abandon the colony, resulting in it being reverted to the jurisdiction of Machico.

In the 19th century, Santo da Serra was a ferment of religious agitation, instigated by the Scottish physician Robert Kalley, who opened a medical practice in the parish, providing counselling free of charge to the residents. At the same time that he treated his patients, the doctor proselytized his Protestant Calvinist ideals and religion, creating conflict within the community, reaching as far as the municipalities of Machico and Santa Cruz. Consequently, this tumult caused the authorities to establish processes against individuals preaching new doctrines or religious ideals in the community, sending many to prison and forcing Dr. Kalley to leave the island.

== Geography ==
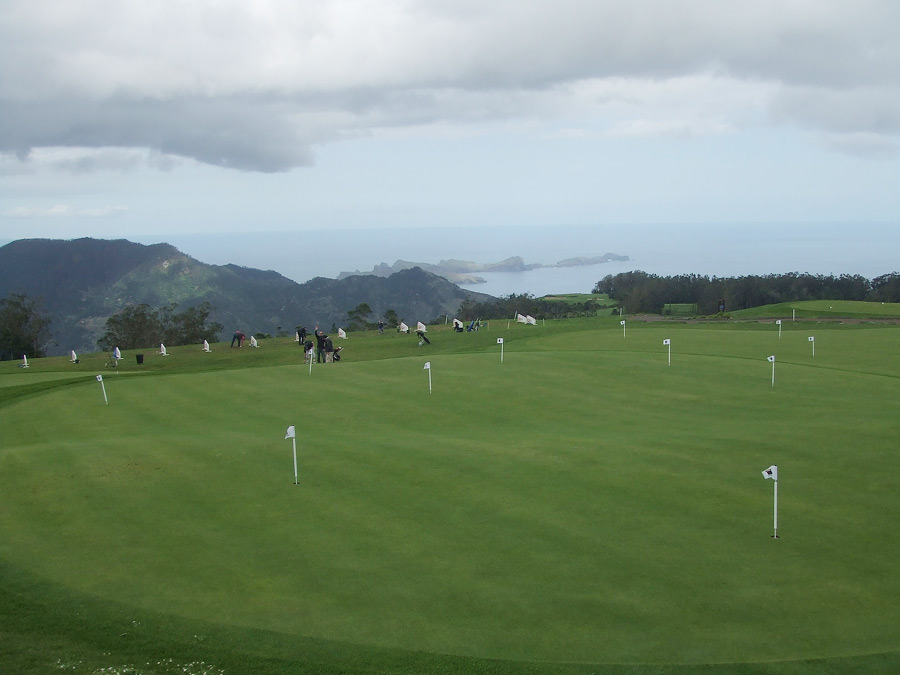
A scene from the Campo de Golfe da Madeira in Santo da Serra, overlooking the eastern coast of the municipality of Machico

The parish of Santo António da Serra, located in the interior of the southern coast of Madeira, pertains to the municipality of Machico, confronted in the north and east by the parish of Porto da Cruz, west by the municipality of Santa Cruz, and by extent 20 kilometres from Funchal, the regional capital. It is situated in rough plateau, around 700 metres altitude, overlooking Machico, characterized by forest vistas of chestnut, acacia and elderberry trees that were acquired by many English to construct farms during settlement.

The principal places (Portuguese: lugares) in the parish are: Ribeira de Machico, Igreja, Fajã dos Rolos, Fajã das Vacas, Margaça, Lombo das Faias, Lamaceiros and Achada do Barro.

== Economy ==
The main activity is predominantly agricultural, and specifically the raising of dairy or beef cattle. The traditional routines are preserved in the parish and the cultivation of fields, have been restricted by the geography, resulting in the use of techniques employed by older generations. The use of natural fertilizers and resources found in the local area and local dependency has prevailed. Along with the incept commercial activity, commonly used to support the local market, the parish has also expanded into hostelry to expand local revenues, while the Campo de Golfe da Madeira (the oldest golf course on Madeira, has already attracted many of the important athletes of the sport.
