= Ponta de São Lourenço =

Easternmost point of the island of Madeira

- Cape
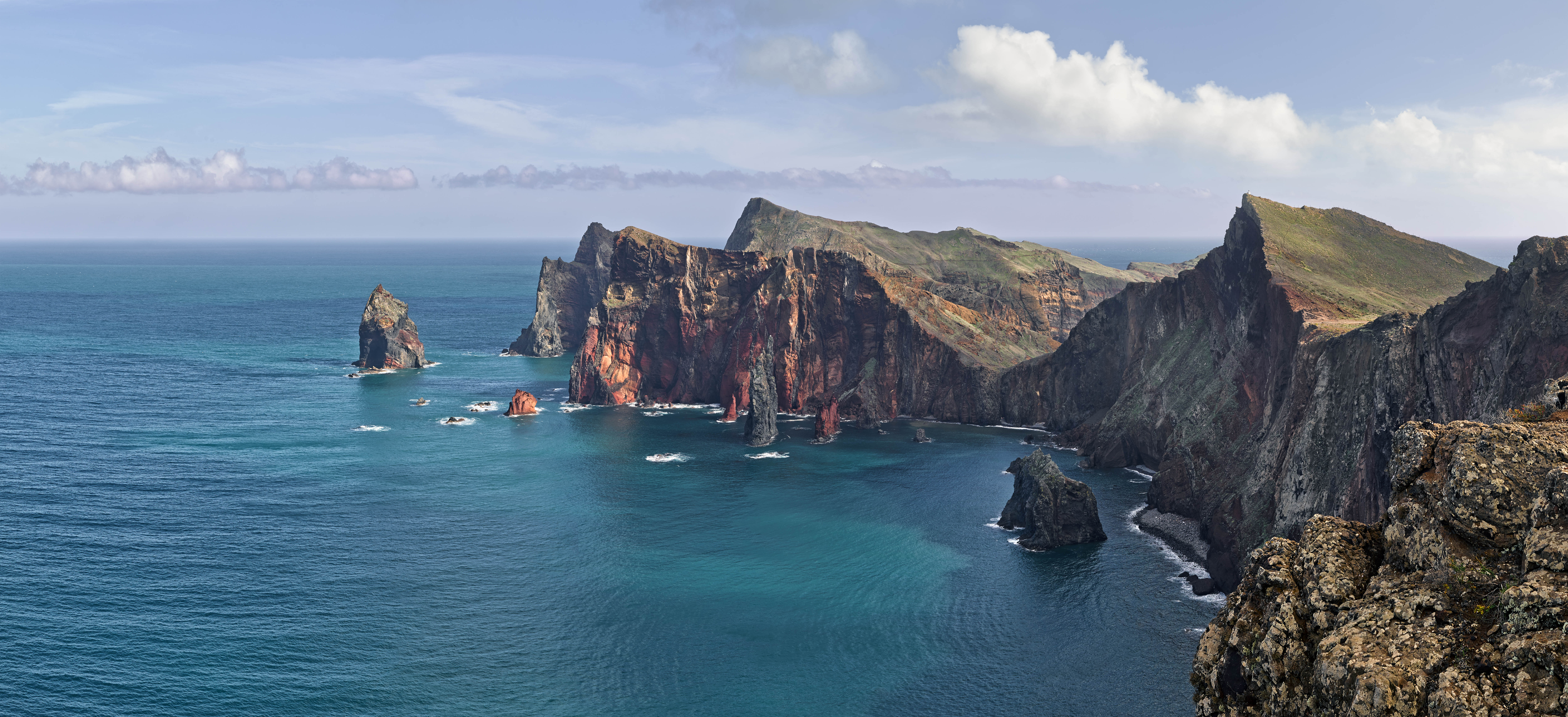
- Ponta de São Lourenço from the vicinity of Machico

- Location within Madeira
- Coordinates: 32°44′45″N 16°42′40″W
- Location: Eastern Madeira Island
- Part of: Machico Municipality
- Water bodies: Atlantic Ocean

Ponta de São Lourenço (Portuguese for the "Point of Saint Lawrence") is the easternmost point of the island of Madeira. It is inside the town of Caniçal and forms a part of the municipality of Machico. Its terrain are made up of rocks and herbaceous vegetation. Since 1982, the headland is a nature reserve, where it has the conservation of its endemic plants including Matthiola maderensis, Echium nervosum, and Andryala glandulosa, and it has fauna, including birds, insects, and molluscs. One of them is Monachus monachus, a seal. Marine fauna are in the waters surrounding the headland.

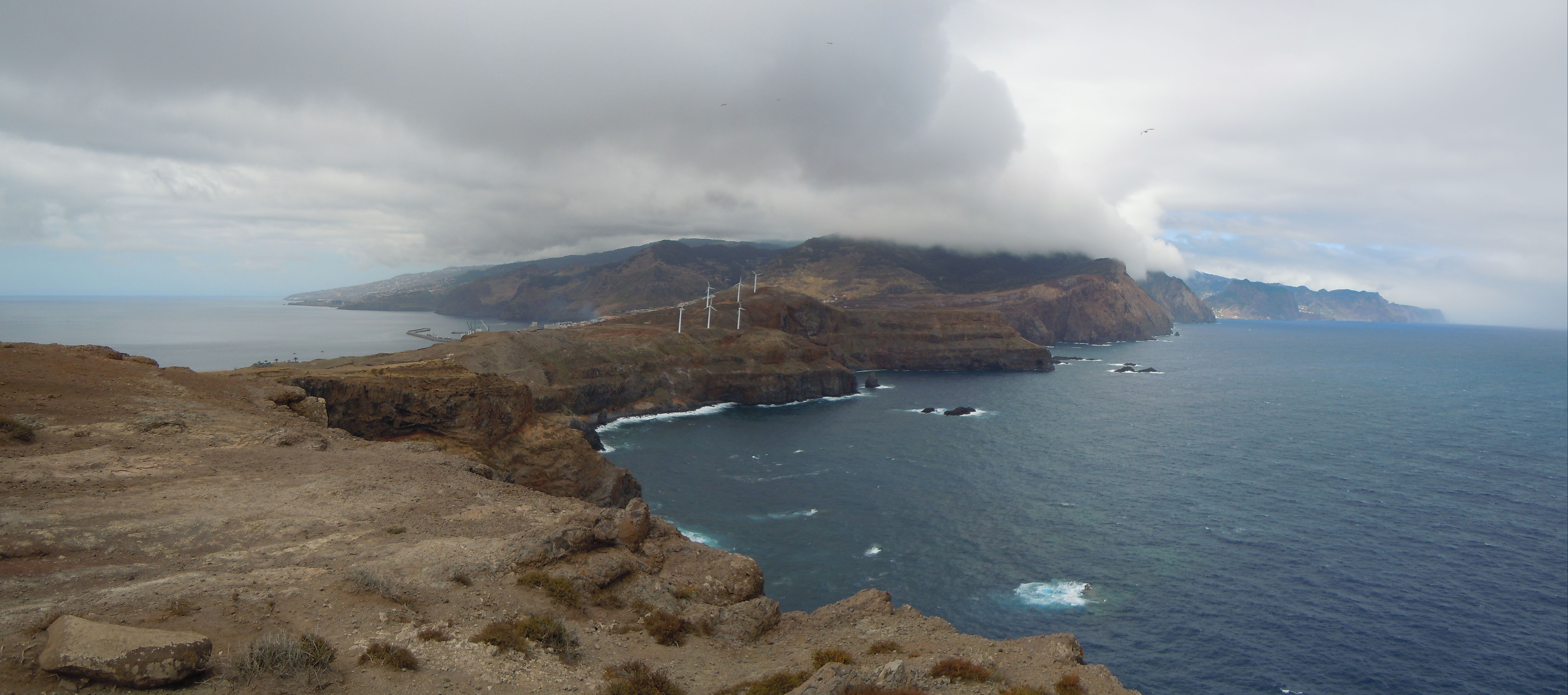
Ponta de São Lourenço from Baixas do Guincho, the vicinity of the island's new port

Northeast of the islet is Porto Santo, and southeast is Bugio and the Deserted Islands. Nearby are a few islets with the easternmost being Ilhéu do Farol (Farol Islet), where its nearby lighthouse is located.

The headland's highest point is Pico do Furado. There is a path which takes about an hour to walk from the headland entrance. To the west is the New Port of Madeira.

The headland's geology consists of pyroclastic rocks as well as basalt dykes (dikes) and some coasts being eroded. The group dates back to the Late Pleistocene, about 100,000 years ago.

== Important Bird Area ==
Ponta de São Lourenço, along with the islets of Ilhéuda Cevada and Ilhéu do Farol at the eastern end, have been recognised as an Important Bird Area (IBA) by BirdLife International for their seabird colonies, including the largest Caspian gull colony in Madeira.

== Gallery ==
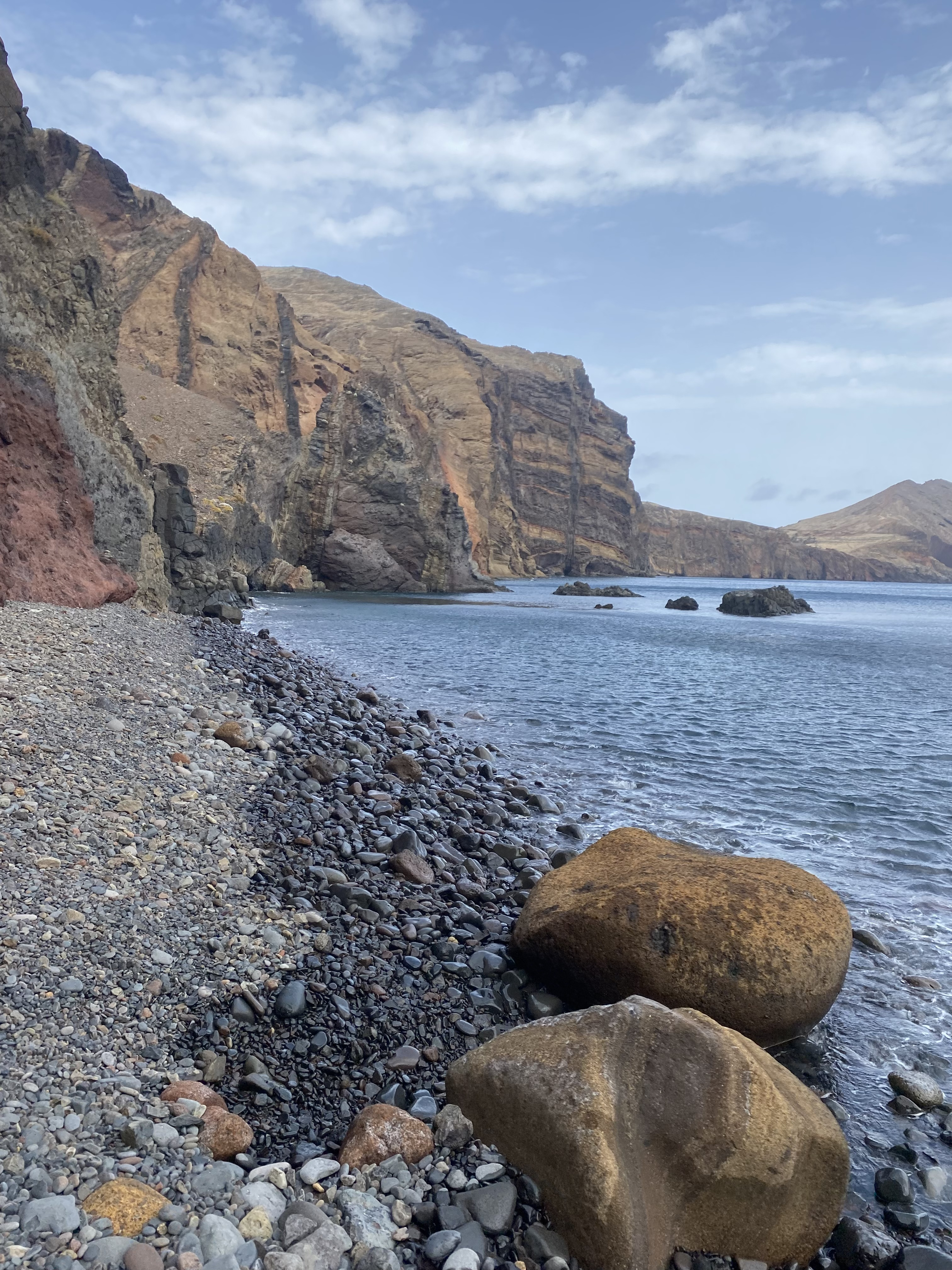
Baía D'Abra beach

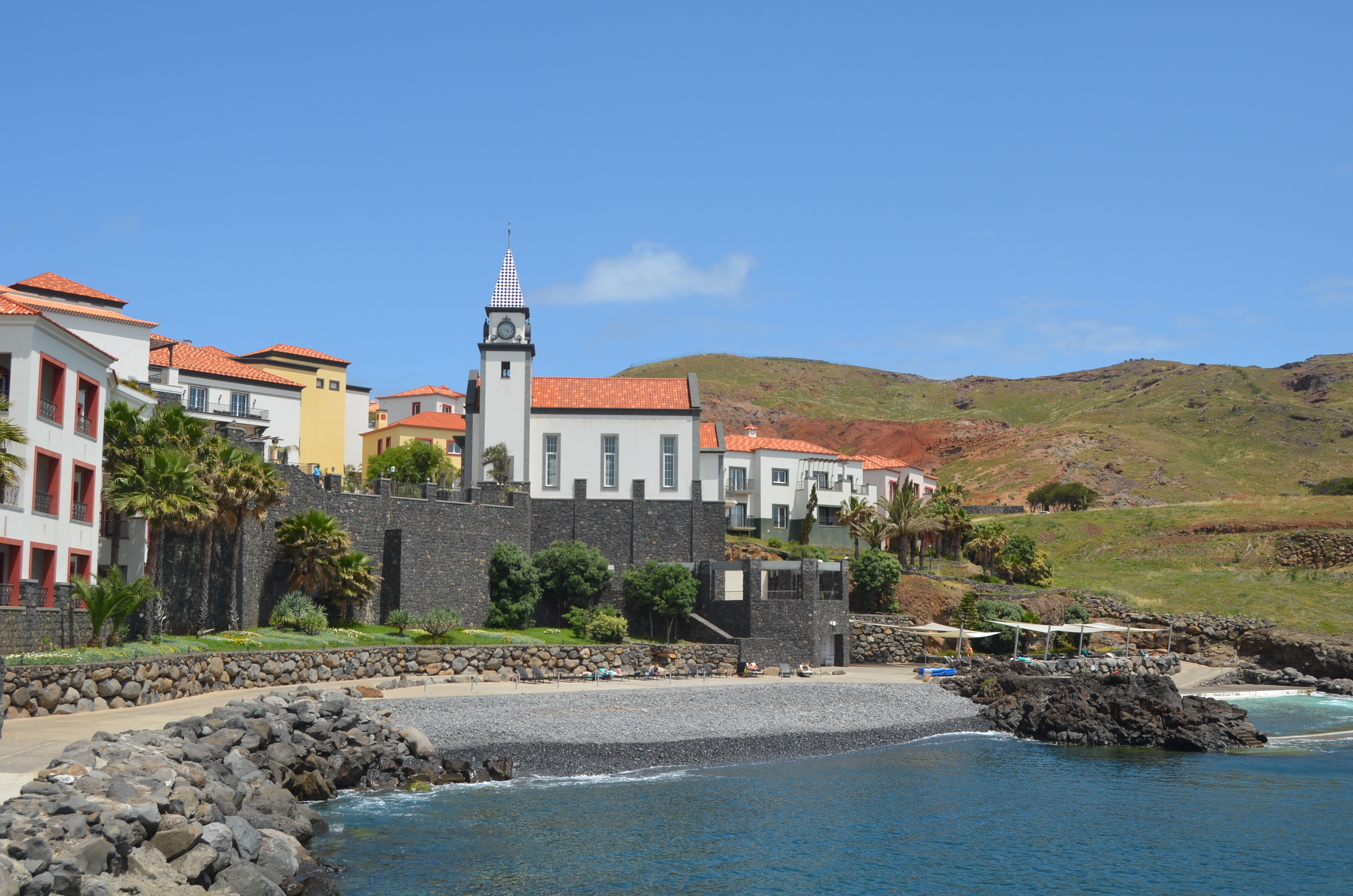
Quinta do Lorde

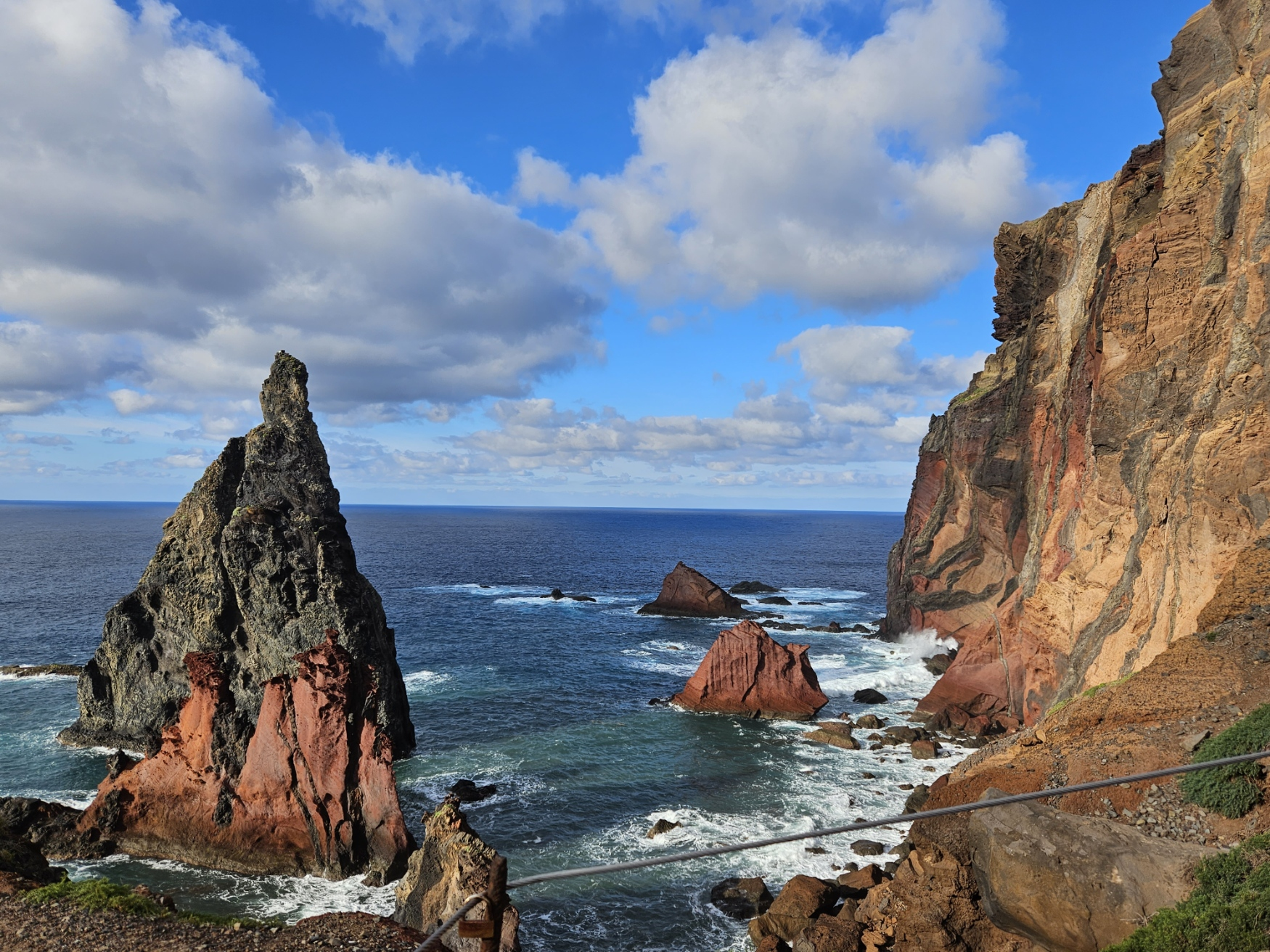
Pedra Furada

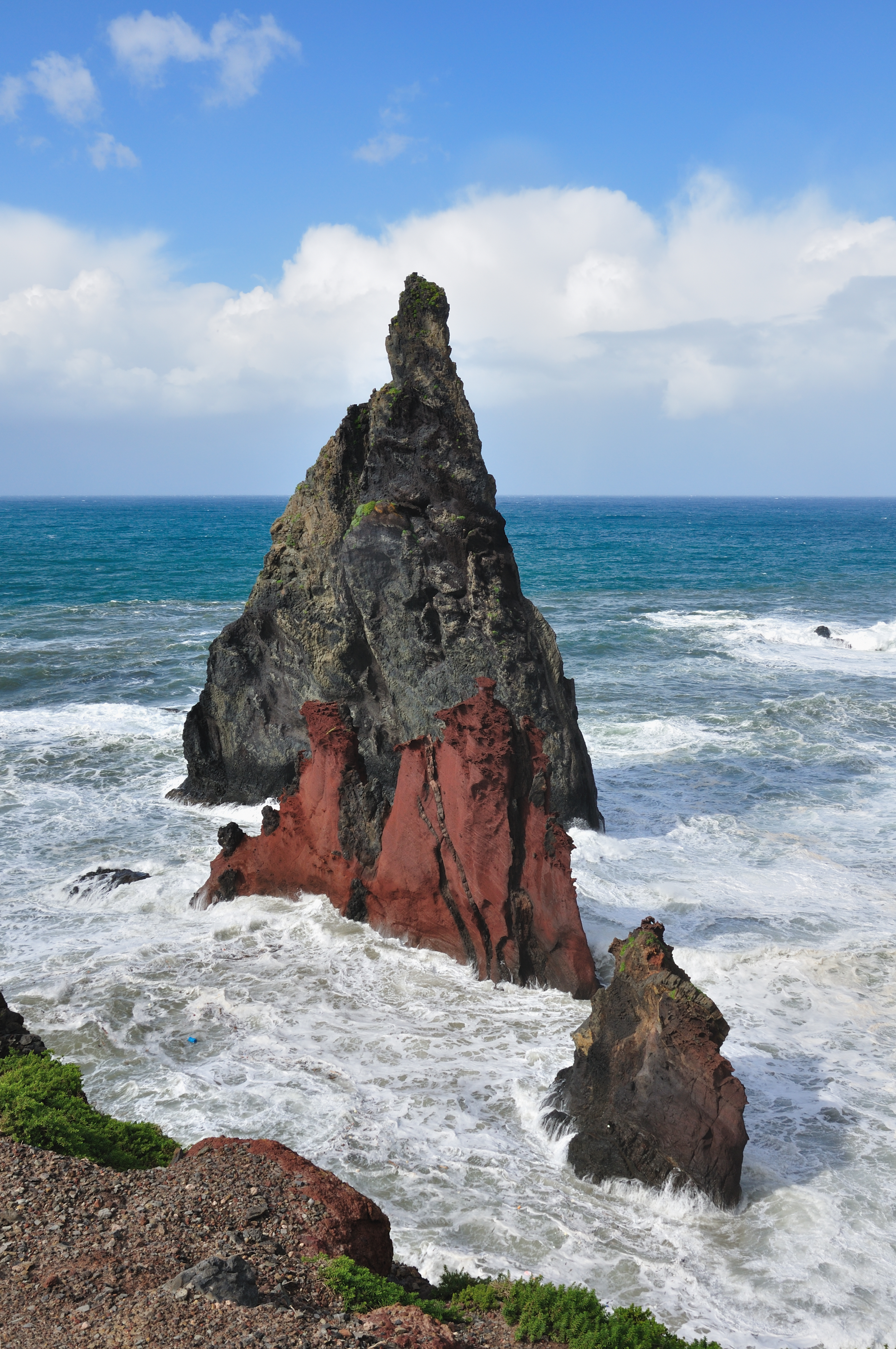
Other perspective of Pedra Furada

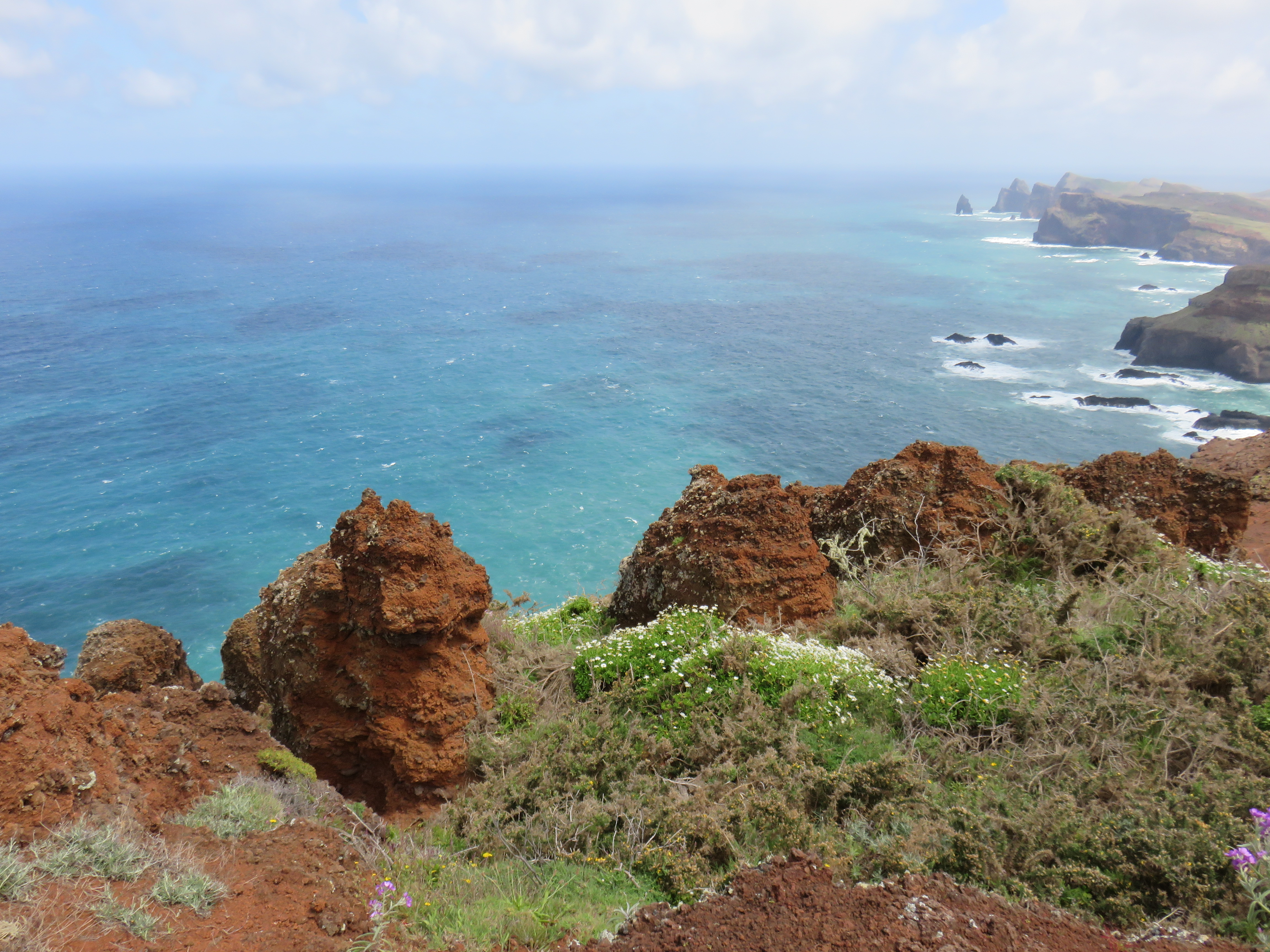
Levada Caniçal-Boca do Risco, Parque Natural da Madeira
