= João Gonçalves Zarco =

Portuguese explorer (c. 1390–1471)

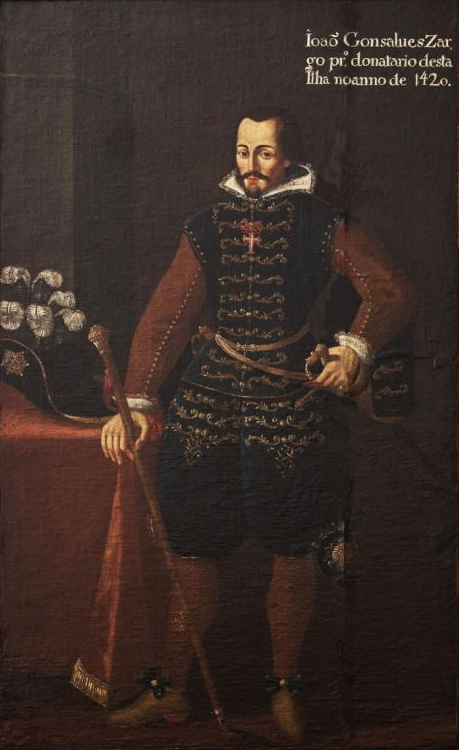
- A posthumous portrait attributed to Nicolau Ferreira, c. 1790

1st Donatary-Captain of Funchal
- In office 1425–1467
- Monarchs: John I Edward I Afonso V
- Succeeded by: João Gonçalves da Câmara

Personal details
- Born: c. 1390 Kingdom of Portugal
- Died: 21 November 1471 Funchal
- Occupation: Explorer, colonial administrator
- Known for: Settler of the Archipelago of Madeira

João Gonçalves Zarco (Portuguese pronunciation: [ˈʒwɐ̃w̃ ɡõˈsal.vɨʒ ˈzaɾ.ku]; c. 1390 – 21 November 1471) was a Portuguese explorer who established settlements and recognition of the Madeira Islands, and was appointed first captain of Funchal by Henry the Navigator.

== Life ==
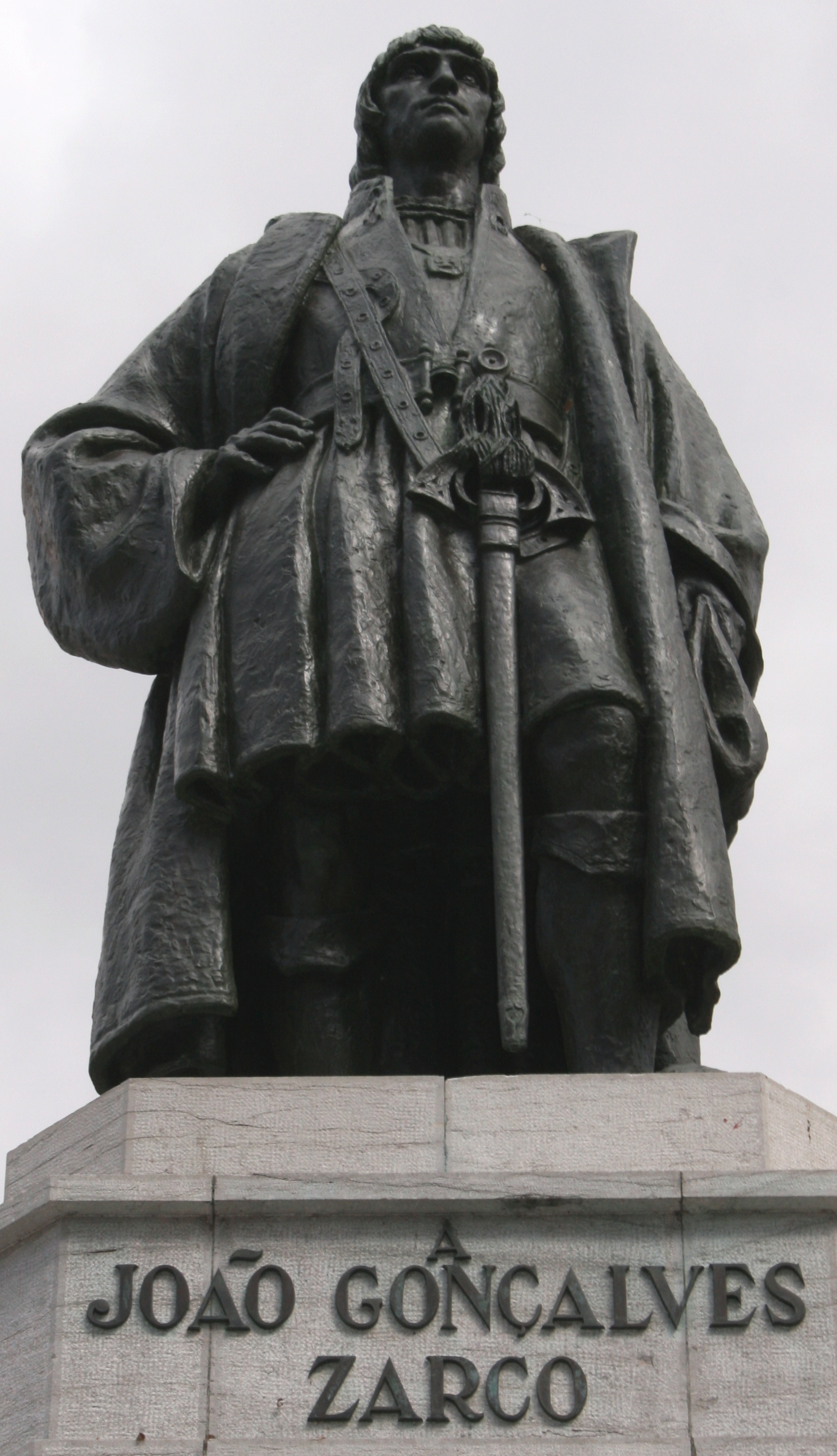
A statue of Zarco stands on the Avenida Arriaga, one of the main streets in the Madeiran capital of Funchal.

Zarco was born in Portugal, and became a knight at the service of Prince Henry the Navigator's household. In his service at an early age, Zarco commanded the caravels guarding the coast of the Algarve from Muslim incursions, was at the conquest of Ceuta, and later led the caravels that recognized the island of Porto Santo in 1418 to 1419 and afterward, the island of Madeira 1419 to 1420. He founded the city of Câmara de Lobos. He was granted, as hereditary leader (Capitania), half the island of Madeira (the Capitania of Funchal, being its first Captain-major). Together with his fellow fleet commanders, Tristão Vaz Teixeira and Bartolomeu Perestrelo, he initiated the settle of the islands in 1425. As a knight of the House of Avis, he participated in the siege of Tangier, in 1437, which ended in failure. He died at Funchal, Madeira.

== Ancestry and descendency ==
He married Constança Rodrigues, daughter of Rodrigo Lopes de Sequeiros (?) and wife, and had the following issue:

- João Gonçalves da Câmara (d. Funchal, Madeira, 26 March 1501), married to Dona Mécia de Noronha, daughter of Dom João Henriques de Noronha (bastard son of Alfonso, Count of Gijón and Noroña) and wife Beatriz, Lady de Mirabel and sister of Dom Garcia Henriques, and had issue, and also one son by an unknown mother
- Rui Gonçalves da Câmara, 3rd Donatary Captain of São Miguel Island, married to Maria de Bettencourt, natural daughter of Maciot de Bettencourt by Teguise, without issue, he had a son by one Maria Rodrigues and three more children by an unknown mother
- Garcia Rodrigues da Câmara, married to Violante de Freitas, and had issue
- Beatriz Gonçalves da Câmara, married to Diogo Cabral, and had issue
- Isabel Gonçalves da Câmara, married to Diogo Afonso de Aguiar, o Velho (the Old), and had issue
- Helena Gonçalves da Câmara, married to Martim Mendes de Vasconcelos, and had issue
- Catarina Gonçalves da Câmara, married to Garcia Homem de Sousa

== Possible Jewish ancestry ==
There are discussions as to whether João Gonçalves Zarco could have been of Jewish Converso origin. Zarco was a prominent Jewish family from Santarém and Lisbon. Mossé Zarco was King João II's tailor. There was also a Portuguese doctor named Joseph Zarco, whom some authors claim to be Joseph Ibn Sharga, the great kabbalist, and a sixteenth-century poet named Yehuda Zarco. Augusto Mascarenhas Barreto suggested that Christopher Columbus could have been of Jewish descent from Portugal and his real name was Salvador Fernandes Zarco. Isabel Violante Pereira also attributes Jewish ancestry to João Gonçalves Zarco.

== In culture ==
The novel of Arkan Simaan, L'Écuyer d'Henri le Navigateur (Harmattan, Paris, 2007), deals with Zarco's life.
