= Tristão Vaz Teixeira =

Portuguese navigator and explorer (c. 1395–1480)

Tristão Vaz
- Capitain of the Donatary of Machico
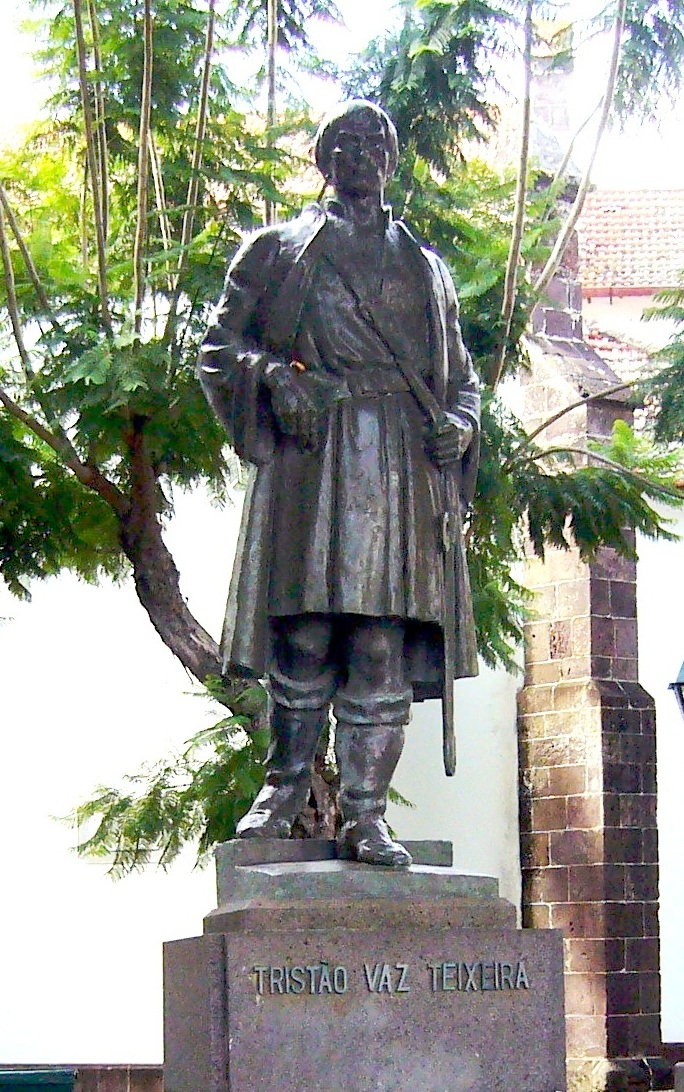
- Statue of Tristão Vaz Teixeira in Machico

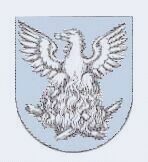
- Coat of arms
- Tenure: 1440-1480
- Predecessor: Office created
- Other names: Tristão Vaz de Teixeira; Tristão da Ilha (Tristão of the Island)
- Known for: One of the discoverers of Madeira archipelago and first capitain of the Donatary of Machico
- Born: c. 1395; Kingdom of Portugal
- Died: 1480; Silves, Kingdom of Portugal
- Spouse: Branca Teixeira
- Occupation: Explorer, colonial administrator

Tristão Vaz Teixeira (Portuguese pronunciation: [tɾiʃˈtɐ̃w̃ ˈvaʃ tɐjˈʃɐj.ɾɐ]; c. 1395–1480) was a Portuguese navigator and explorer who, together with João Gonçalves Zarco and Bartolomeu Perestrelo, was the official discoverer and one of the first settlers of the archipelago of Madeira (1419–1420).

== Biography ==
Born Tristão Vaz, he later adopted the surname Teixeira after his marriage to Dona Branca Teixeira. Tristão was a nobleman of the household of Prince Henry the Navigator and took part in the conquest of Ceuta.

Or in 1415 or in 1418/9 he was knighted and inducted in the Order of Christ by Prince Henry due to his service in Ceuta.

Around 1418, while exploring the coast of Africa, he and João Gonçalves Zarco were blown off course by bad weather and came upon an island they named Porto Santo (“Holy Harbor”), very likely because they landed there in All Saints' Day ("Dia de Todos os Santos"). Shortly afterward, Prince Henry ordered them to settle the island, together with Bartolomeu Perestrelo. Following a rabbit infestation that made agriculture difficult, they relocated to the nearby island of Madeira, in 1425. The island proved hospitable and fertile, prompting Prince Henry to send additional settlers to colonize it.

The governance of Madeira was divided between João Gonçalves Zarco and Tristão Vaz Teixeira, who were appointed Captain-majors (capitães-donatários) of Funchal and Machico, respectively. Tristão was officially confirmed in this post on 11 May 1440.

Teixeira actively promoted and frequently organized festivals, tournaments, equestrian games, and poetry recitals. He is credited as the author of three poems included in the Cancioneiro Geral compiled by Garcia de Resende. He was responsible for the construction of the original chapel of São Roque, dedicated to the patron saint against contagious diseases, as well as the chapel of São João Batista, the main church of Machico. This church was intended as a family mausoleum—as indicated by the Teixeira family coat of arms—this church.

His capitaincy was temporarily confiscated by the King and he was banished from Machico due to him committed atrocities against a banished nobleman who had had illicit relations with one of his daughters. He was pardoned in February 17^{th} 1452 by the King and regained his capitaincy.

Throughout his life, Tristão Vaz Teixeira participated in further raids and exploratory expeditions along the African coast, including the 1437 failed attempt of conquering Tangier.

He married in the 1420s with Branca Teixeira, in the continent, with whom he had several children. As she was from a more important family, he took her name.

Having some business in Algarve, he moved to Silves, where he died at the age of 85.

He and his wife are the ancestors of many important families and individuals from Madeira, like Cristiano Ronaldo or the Teixeira family.

== Sources ==
- Zurara, Gomes Eanes de (1841). Chronica do descobrimento e conquista de Guiné, 1453. Paris: J. P. Aillaud.
