= Order of Christ =

Order of Christ may refer to:

- Order of Christ (Portugal) – former Knights Templar Order awarded initially by the kings of Portugal, now by the Portuguese state
- Order of Christ (Brazil) – a former branch of the Portuguese Order of Christ in the Empire of Brazil, now an order bestowed by the non-regnant Brazilian Imperial Family
- Order of Christ (Kongo) – a continuation of the Portuguese Order of Christ by the Kingdom of Kongo, now an order bestowed by pretenders to the throne of the Kingdom of Kongo
- Order of Christ (papacy) – the Papal order

== See also ==
- Order of Christ Cross
