= Santo António da Serra (Santa Cruz) =

- Civil parish
- Interactive map of Santo António da Serra
- Location in Madeira
- Coordinates: 32°40′20″N 16°48′20″W
- Country: Portugal
- Auton. region: Madeira
- Island: Madeira
- Municipality: Santa Cruz

Area
  - Total: 14.75 km^{2} (5.70 sq mi)

Population (2011)
  - Total: 936
  - Density: 63.5/km^{2} (164/sq mi)
- Time zone: UTC+00:00 (WET)
  - Summer (DST): UTC+01:00 (WEST)
- Postal code: 9100-268
- Area code: 291
- Website: www.jfsantoantoniodaserra.ifreg.pt

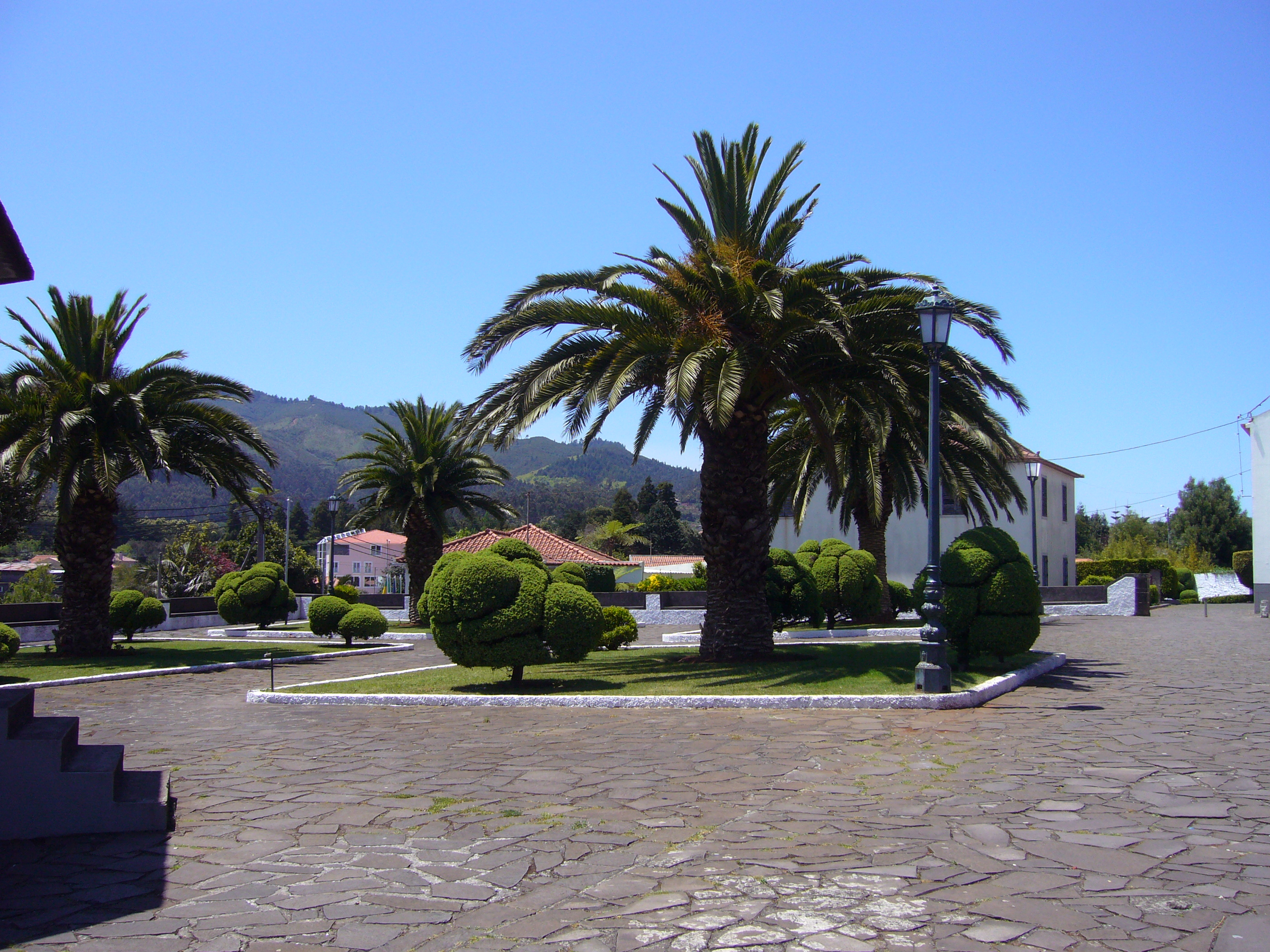
Townsquare at Santo António da Serra

Santo António da Serra is a civil parish in the municipality of Santa Cruz on the Portuguese island of Madeira. The parish is adjacent to another parish in the neighbouring municipality of Machico to the north, which is also named Santo António da Serra. The population in 2011 was 936, in an area of 14.75 km².

== Geography ==
It is located west of Machico and east-northeast of the regional capital of Funchal. The parish contains the localities João Ferino, Pereira, Madre d'Água, Curral Velho, Ribeira de João Gonçalves, Achada do Barro, Fajã da Ovelha and Serrado das Amexieiras.
