= Judah Zarko =

16th-century Greek Hebrew poet

Judah ben Abraham Zarko (Hebrew: יהודה בן אברהם זרקו) was a 16th-century Greek Hebrew poet. Born at Rhodes, he lived for a few years at Salonika where he joined the Ḥakme ha-shir (lit. 'Sages of Poetry') literary circle.

During a residence at Constantinople Zarko wrote his maqama Sefer leḥem Yehudah (Constantinople, 1560), which contains an allegory on the soul, metrical and non-metrical poems, and epigrams directed against Maimonides and Judah Sabara. A letter written by him to congratulate Joseph Hamon on his marriage is given at the beginning of the anonymously-compiled Hebrew style-book Sefer yefeh nof, and some of his shorter poems were published by Hirsch Edelmann in his Dibre ḥefetz (London, 1853).
