= Porto da Cruz =

- Civil parish
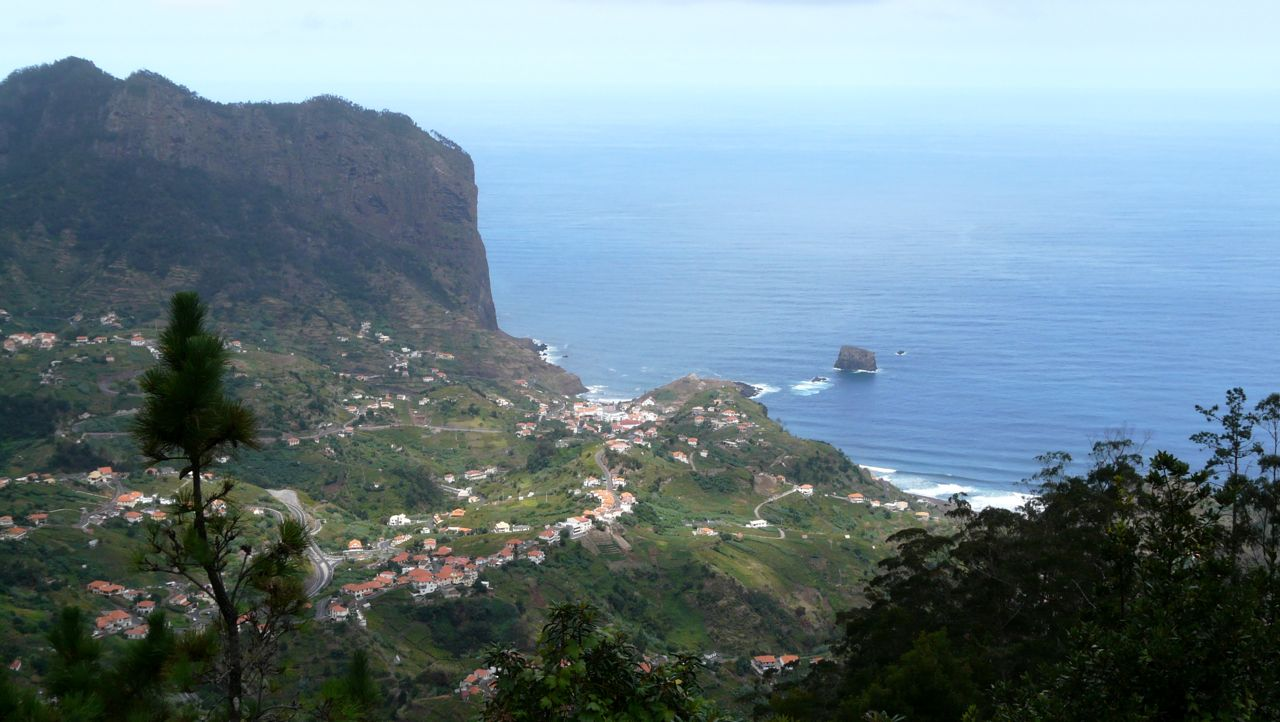
- The northern coast of Porto da Cruz, showing the mountainous Penha da Águia, as seen from the lookout of Portela (660 metres)

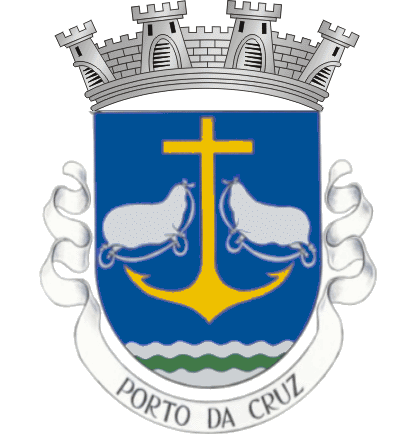
- Coat of arms

- Location in Madeira
- Coordinates: 32°46′20″N 16°49′44″W
- Country: Portugal
- Auton. region: Madeira
- Island: Madeira
- Municipality: Machico

Area
  - Total: 25.22 km^{2} (9.74 sq mi)
- Elevation: 553 m (1,814 ft)

Population (2011)
  - Total: 2,597
  - Density: 103.0/km^{2} (266.7/sq mi)
- Time zone: UTC+00:00 (WET)
  - Summer (DST): UTC+01:00 (WEST)
- Postal code: 9225-050
- Area code: 291
- Patron: Nossa Senhora da Guadalupe
- Website: www.porto-da-cruz.com

Porto da Cruz (Portuguese pronunciation: [ˈpoɾtu ðɐ ˈkɾuʃ], is a civil parish in the municipality of Machico in the northeastern corner of Madeira. The population in 2011 was 2,597, in an area of 25.22 km^{2}.

== History ==
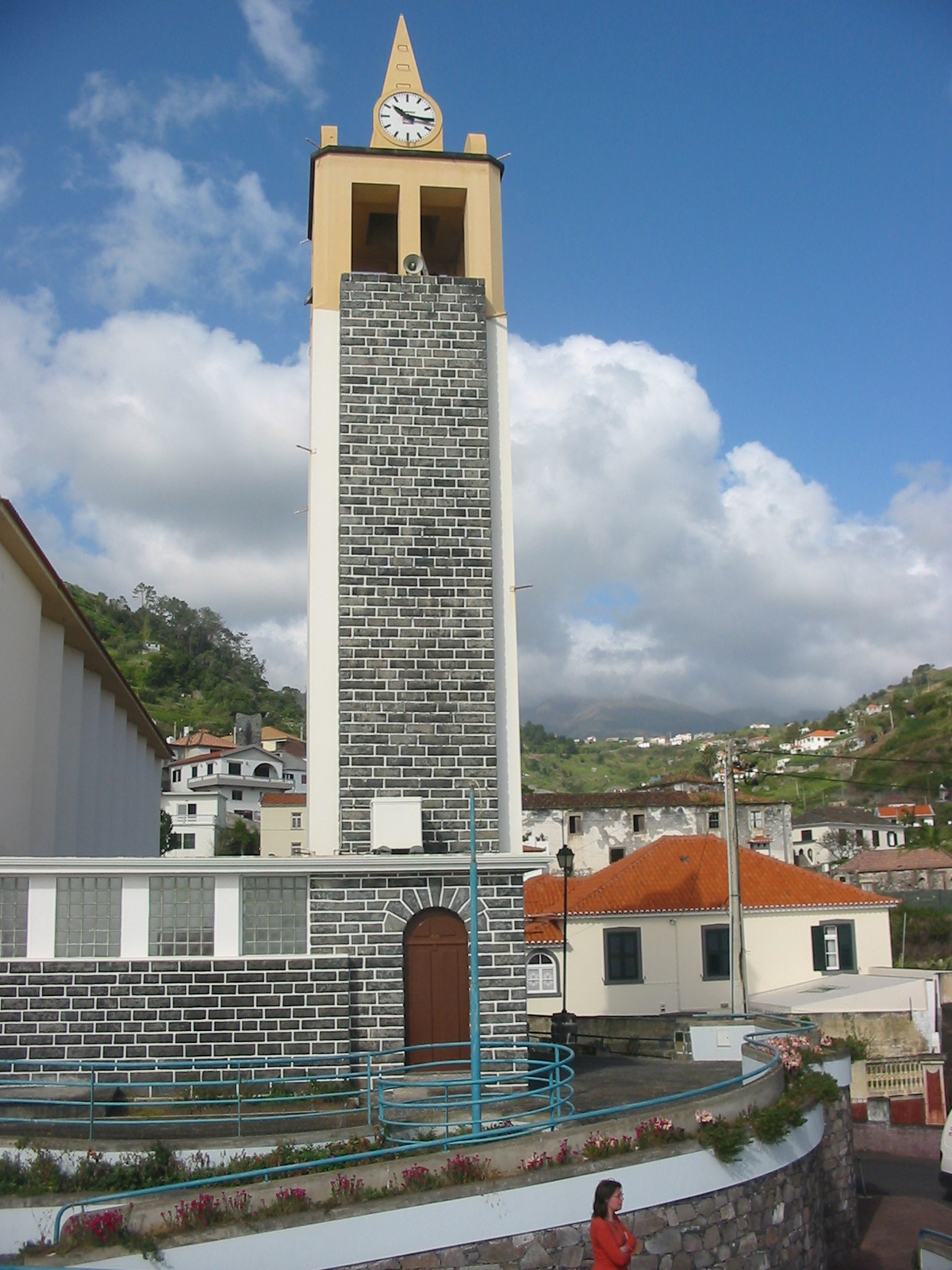
Church of Nossa Senhora de Guadalupe in central Porto Da Cruz

The origin of the community's name came from the fact that the original discoverer affixed a steel cross at the port, in order to better identify the location to ocean travelers. During the early settlement of the northern coast, goods destined for the northern communities (such as Santo António da Serra) were offloaded in the harbor.

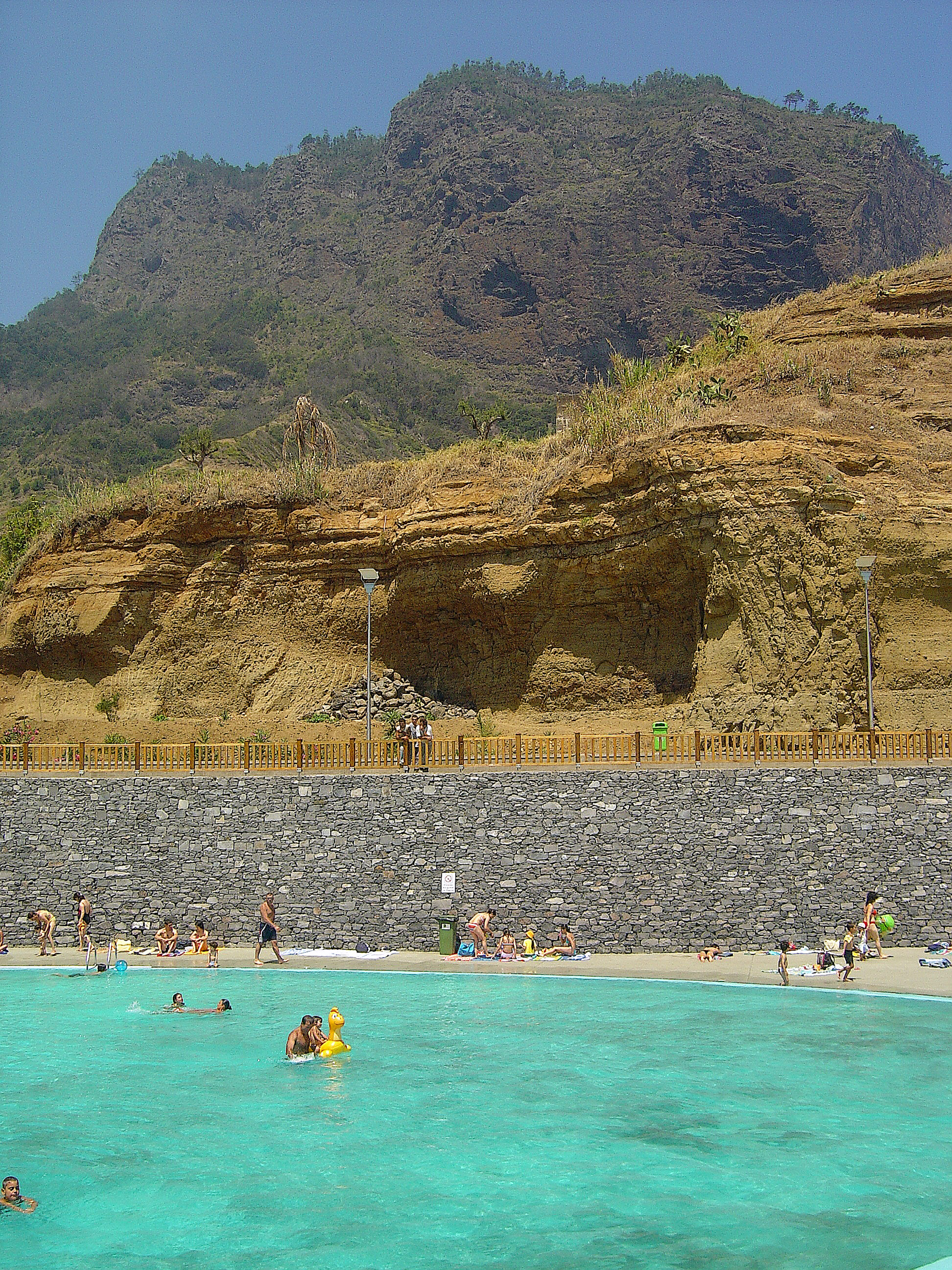
Between sky and water: the public pools in the coastal village of Porto da Cruz

The parish of Porto da Cruz was created on 26 September 1577, by Jerónimo Barreto, establishing as its patron Nossa Senhora da Piedade (English: Our Lady of Piety). During the contract signing, the formal donation identified the new church as Nossa Senhora da Glória (English: Our Lady of Glory), but after completion, it was consecrated as Nossa Senhora de Guadalupe (English: Our Lady of Guadaloupe).

Since its establishment, the parish pertained to the Captaincy of Machico, but in 1835, it was integrated into the municipality of Santana with the administrative reforms of the Liberal regime. On 19 October 1852, these changes were nullified and the parish returned to the municipality of Machico.

Cultivation and harvesting of sugarcane occupied the activities of early settlers. The aguardente factory, completed after 1858, was part of this industry, converting the grapes and juice into a local spirit, uniquely cultivating the American caste of grape in this territory.

== Geography ==
The northern parish is enveloped by the mountains of Paul da Serra: Pico da Suna (1040 metres), Pico do Larano (765 metres) and Pico da Maiata (766 metres) are the highest points in the parish. Even along the coast, Penha de Águia (a mountainous escarpment 580 metres in altitude) is difficult to climb; the area, Penha da Águia, means mountain of the eagles, giving the impression that only the birds settle these lands.

The rugged terrain and difficult communication has, over the years, resulted in small agglomerations of inhabitants, resulting in a "community of communities" that includes 78 different localities:

- Cabeço da Volta
- Cabeço do Vento
- Cabeço Velho
- Caias Velho
- Cal
- Caldeirão
- Canavieira
- Cancela – Larano
- Casas Próximas
- Castelejo
- Carquejas
- Cerrado
- Chã
- Chãs
- Chão da Cevada
- Chão das Feiteiras
- Chão das Moiras
- Chão dos Tocos
- Chiqueiros
- Choupana
- Caminho Chão
- Caminho do Moinho
- Caminho Novo
- Córrego da Lapa
- Currais
- Curralinho
- Degolada
- Eira (Referta)
- Eira do Toco
- Espigão
- Espigão Amarelo
- Fajã da Madeira
- Fajã do Mar
- Fajã do Milho
- Fajã da Palmeira
- Fajanzinha
- Fajã do Furado
- Folhadal
- Fontana
- Fonte Vermelha
- Fontes
- Fontinha
- Francelho
- Forca dos Ratos
- Fonte São João da Fonte
- Furado
- Furna do Negro
- Galo
- Gambão
- Ginjas
- Ilhéu
- Jangalinha
- Jãvelho
- Jogo da Bola
- Juncal
- Junqueira
- Ladeiras
- Ladeira da Rocha
- Ladeirada Paulina
- Lajedo
- Lajinha
- Lamaceiros
- Lameiro
- Larano
- Lava-pés
- Levadiça
- Lombinho
- Lombo
- Lombo do António Dias
- Lombo do Capitão
- Lombo da Carqueja
- Lombo Comprido
- Lombo do Cura
- Lombo da Forma
- Lombo do João Nunes
- Lombo dos Leais (Folhadal)
- Lombo do Morgado
