= Machico, Madeira =

Machico
- Municipality
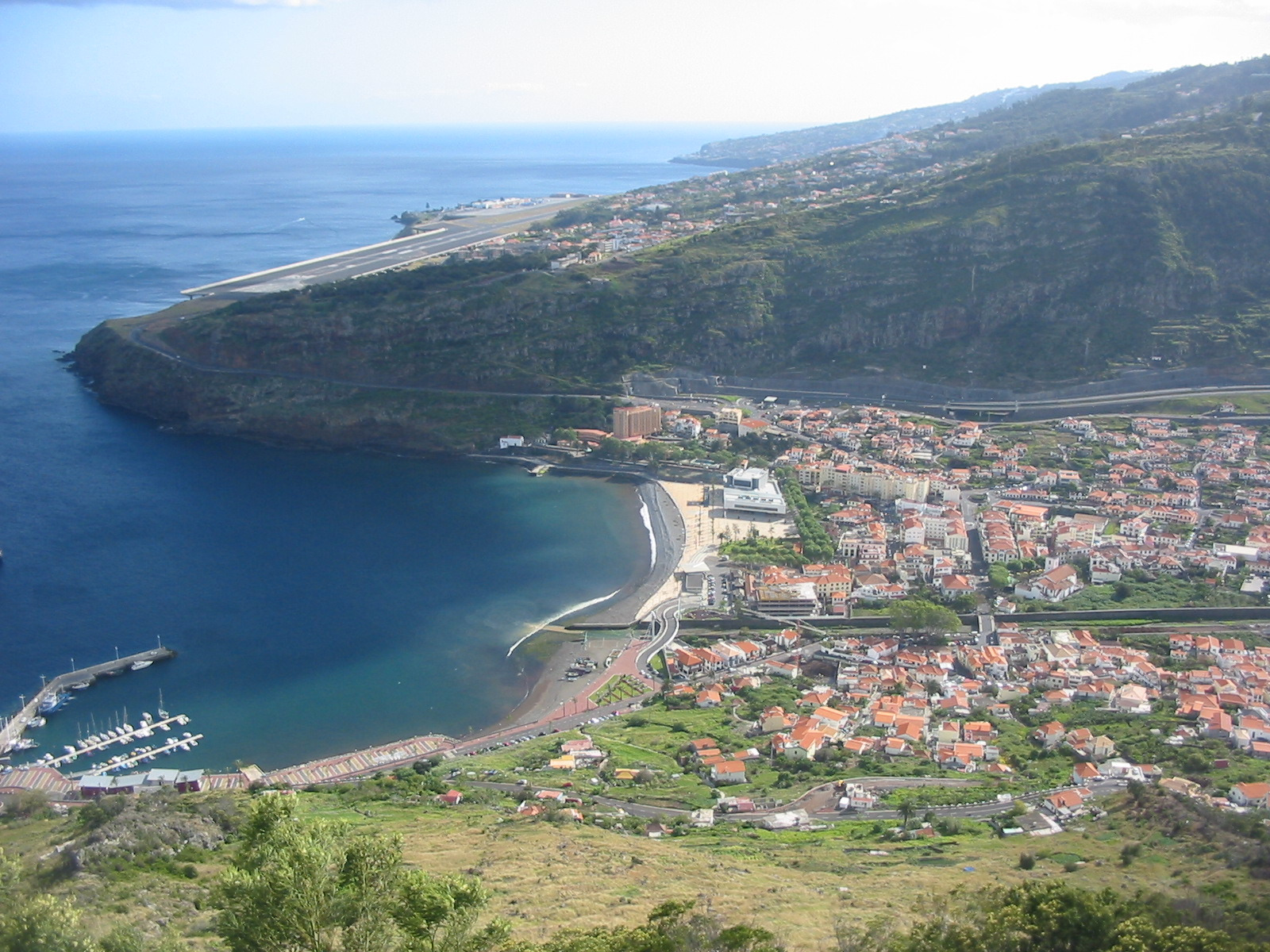
- The town of Machico in the shadow of the International Airport in Santa Cruz

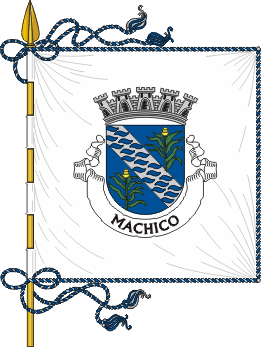
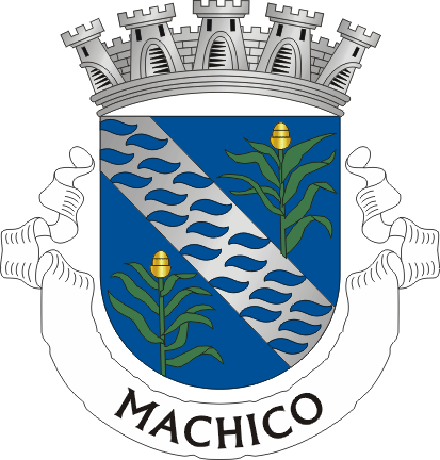
- Flag Coat of arms
- Interactive map of Machico
- Location in Madeira
- Coordinates: 32°42′N 16°46′W
- Country: Portugal
- Auton. region: Madeira
- Island: Madeira
- Established: Settlement: c.1420 Municipality: c.1451 City: 2 August 1996
- Parishes: 5

Government
  - President: Ricardo Miguel Nunes Franco

Area
  - Total: 68.33 km^{2} (26.38 sq mi)

Population (2011)
  - Total: 21,828
  - Density: 319.4/km^{2} (827.4/sq mi)
- Time zone: UTC+00:00 (WET)
  - Summer (DST): UTC+01:00 (WEST)
- Postal code: 9200-099
- Area code: 291
- Patron: Nossa Senhora da Conceição
- Local holiday: 8 May
- Website: http://cm-machico.pt/

Machico (Portuguese pronunciation: [mɐˈʃiku]) is a municipality, parish and city in the southeast part of the island of Madeira, in the Autonomous Region of Madeira. The easternmost municipality on the island, it is also the third-most populous area with a population of 21,828 in 2011. The town, proper, had a population of 10,894 in 2001.

== History ==
"We saw a land covered in trees until the sea and from that band the fog never descended from the range... We saw a great bay..."

— Francisco Alcoforado, 15th Century chronicler

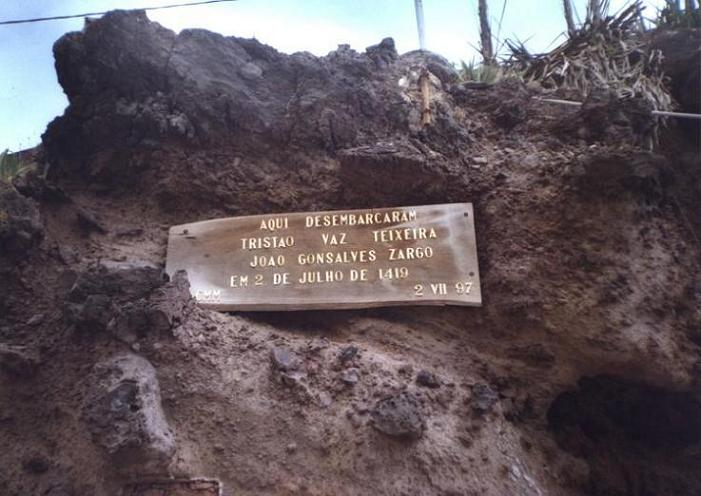
A commemorative plaque marking the place where the first explorers disembarked on Madeira

In calm waters of the early afternoon, on 1 July 1419, João Gonçalves Zarco and Tristão Vaz Teixeira disembarked on the beach of Machico, beginning the era of Portuguese discoveries. On the beach a Mass of thanksgiving was celebrated by Franciscan priests on the feast of the Visitation (2 June), an image of which accompanied the expedition.

Many hypotheses have developed as to the origin of the name of the municipality. The most remembered, and not the least disputed, comes from the romanticized legend of the English lovers Robert Machim and Anne d'Arfet. As the legend explains, the two lovers escaped from England (where their love was forbidden and condemned by the Church), suffered the tragedy of a shipwreck and died on the island that became Madeira, where later the first Portuguese explorers encountered two crosses to which they attributed to the lovers: the name appears to be a corruption of the surname Machin.

On 8 May 1440, the Infante Henry the Navigator awarded Tristão Vaz and his descendants the Captaincy of Machico (which included the Ponta da Oliveira, in Caniço, to the Ponta do São Lourenço and from there to the Ponta do Tristão, in Porto Moniz), and by right the first Captaincy in the archipelago of Madeira. The first settlers eked out a meagre subsistence, as a Franciscan friar noted:

"This Town of Machico (head and seat of the first Captain Tristão) even if its small, with few users, it is well situated, happy, of many vegetable gardens and orchards, situated in the middle of a Ravine so fresh as in high elevations"

— Jerónimo Dias Leite, 16th Century

Still in the 15th century, taking advantage of the abundant water and excellent climate, the first colonists began to cultivate sugar cane, and the first machinery used to process the pulp appeared immediately, facilitating the export to Europe. Although the Captaincy did not have the best lands to cultivate the plant (by 1494 one-fifth of regional production), the village that developed at Machico's beachhead was the centre of the processing of this spice. As the monk Jerónimo Dias Leite indicated: "...the first sugar sold on this island of Madeira was in the town of Machico where there began a make and collect three arrobas [equivalent to 96 pounds] to sell, each arroba [32 pounds] sold for five cruzeiros [historical coinage of Portugal]...".

Machico grew to this lucrative commerce, while Machiquenses families become socially powerful and wealthy from the trade, including the families of the Captains-Donatários (Tristão Vaz's descendants). It was the Teixeira family that erected the first Matriz Church in Machico at the end of the 15th century, in honour of Nossa Senhora da Conceição (Our Lady of Conception).

During the second half of the 15th century, along with Funchal, Machico was elevated to town (1451) and continued to grow, following the course of the ravine into the valley. Two poles developed: the right margin, that included the main barrio and the town's public institutions (municipal chamber, customshouse and church), and the left margin, that included nucleus of Banda d'Além, the Misericórdia (social centre) and Chapel of Christ, now known as the Chapel of Nosso Senhor dos Milagres (Our Lord of Miracles).

In 1803, a landslide was responsible for the destruction of various homes, destroying hedges and walls, the main bridge along the ravine and the Chapel of Nosso Senhor dos Milagres.

Machico also became a front-line during the Revolta da Madeira (Madeira Revolt) in April 1931.

== Geography ==
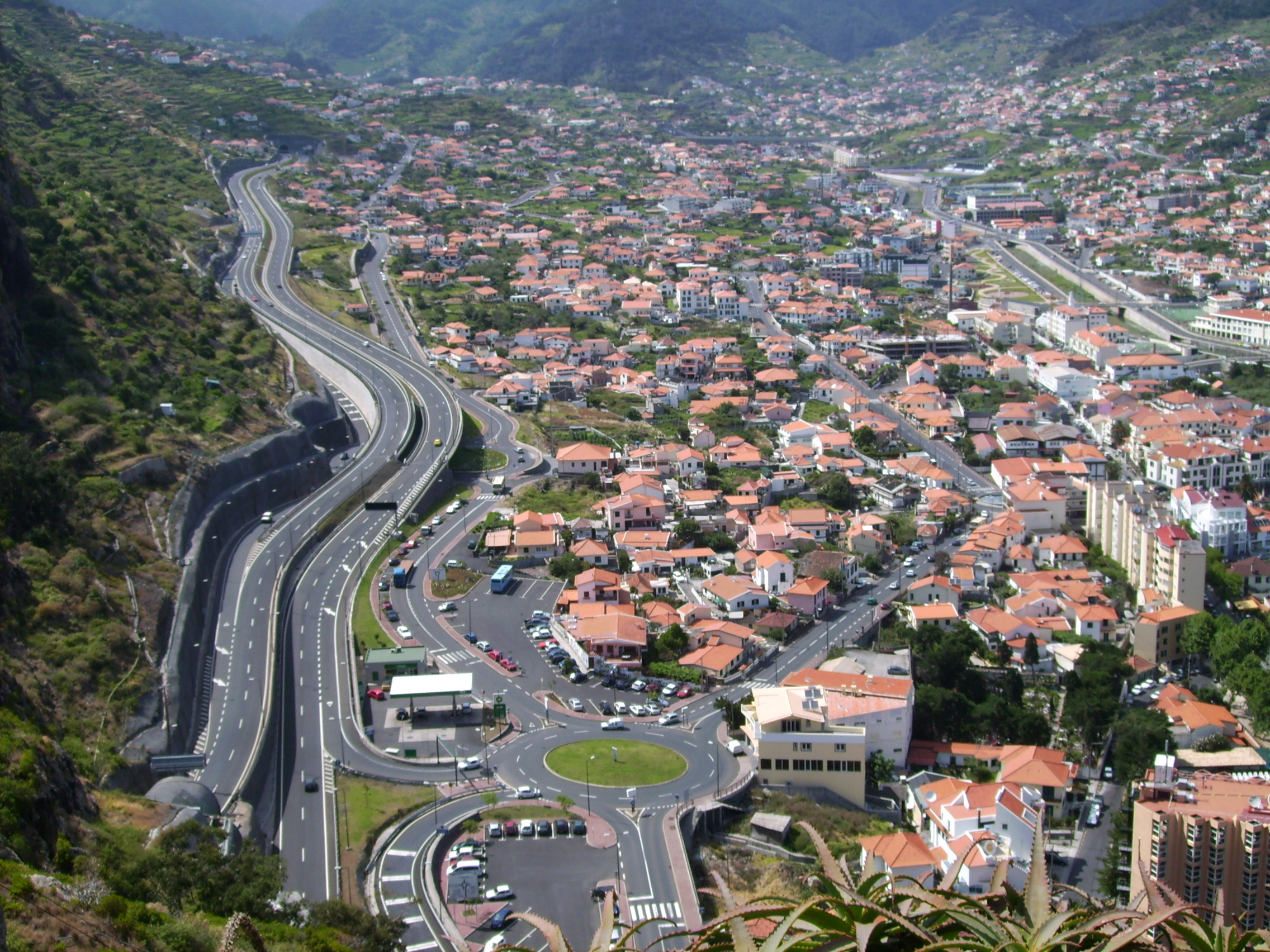
A hub of eastern traffic, Machico is cris-crossed by high-capacity freeways connecting it to settlements in the west

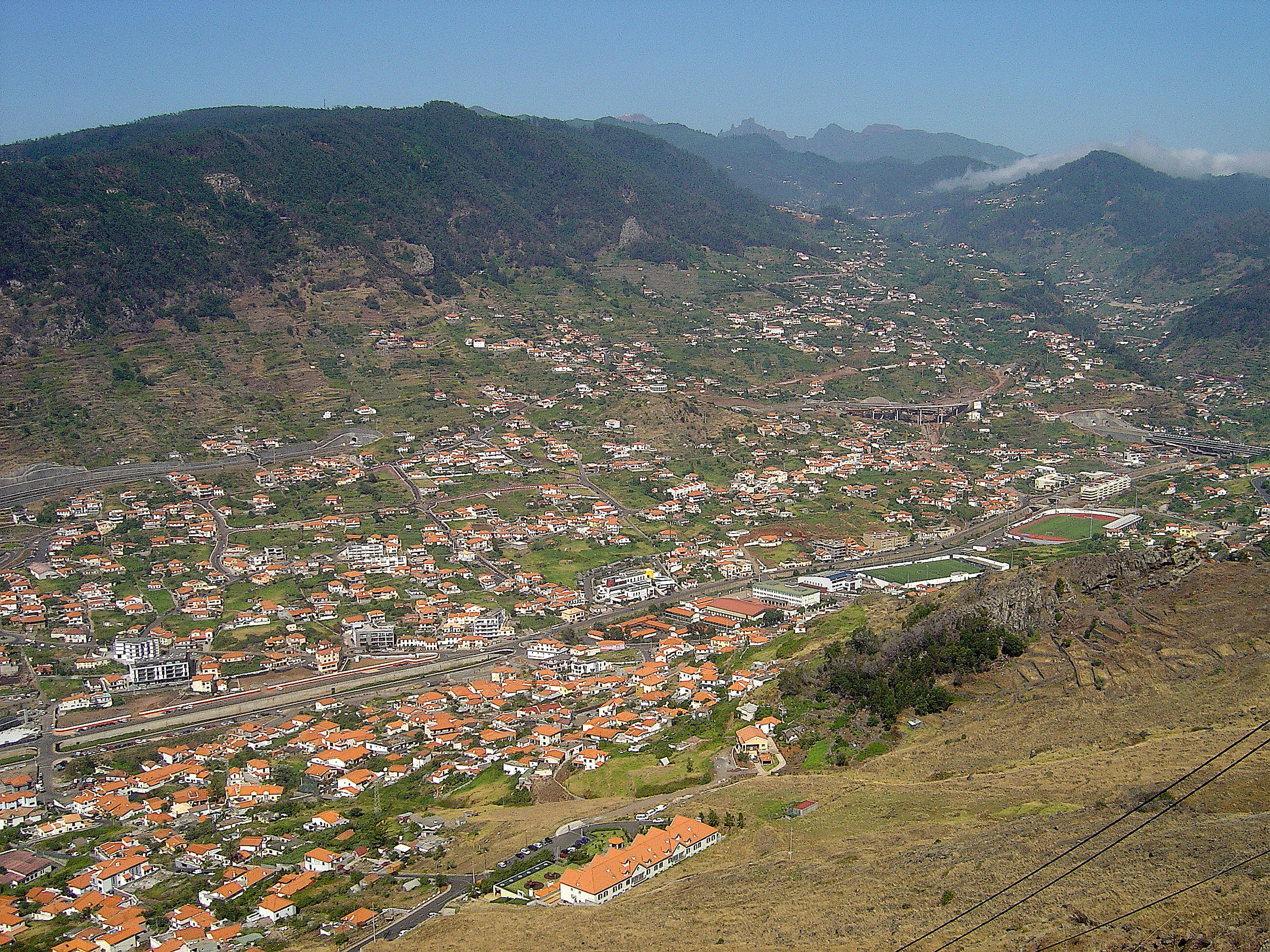
The valley of Machico extending into the foothills, is a concentrated mass of residential and commercial uses

=== Physical geography ===
Machico is located 17 km northeast of Funchal, northwest of the uninhabitable Savage Islands, 20 km southeast of Santana and west-southwest of Porto Santo in the extreme eastern portion of the island of Madeira. It is linked by road from Funchal (the regional capital), to the Santana and the villages of Ribeira Seca and Caniçal. To the existence of mountains on the western coast, it is sandwiched along the coast from the rest of the islands' settlements, while forests lie towards the interior and grasslands cover the north-eastern corner of the municipality.

Geomorphologically, the municipality is dominated by steeped and inclined topography, except in the Machico valley (where slopes are gentle), formed by two mountain ranges: in the east Pico do Facho and to the west the Queimada plateau. Examples of these differences include the area south of Porto da Cruz (in the watershed of Ribeira do Juncal) and in Caniçal (in the Ribeira da Palmeira watershed).

Due to its location and morphological characteristics, the climate of Madeira is complex, whose difference from place to place is accentuated, even in areas relatively close. Machico temperatures are relatively moderate throughout the year, with variation relatively low (only accentuated between elevations).

=== Human geography ===
Administratively, the municipality is governed from its seat in the city of Machico, but five local juntas de freguesia (civil parish government) handle issues in the communities of:

- Água de Pena – supposedly the area explored by João Gonçalos Zarco and his crew after anchoring in Madeira, Pena is the smallest parish in the municipality, and developed from various reconfigurations of the border between Machico and Santa Cruz, today its population includes 1700 inhabitants (2001 census);
- Caniçal – an important fishing community of 3893 inhabitants (2001), the parish of Caniçal (which means area of many fishing lines/rods) extends into the eastern coast of Madeira island to the tip of the cliffs of the promontory/escarpment of Ponta de São Lourenço;
- Machico – historical village, it is the largest parish in terms of population and concentrated residents, with a population of 11,977 (2006 Estimate);
- Porto da Cruz – largest parish in area and the smallest parish in density (2793 inhabitants), whose name was derived from the original discoverers, who fixed a steel cross by the harbour, so that travellers would be able to identify the location;
- Santo António da Serra – considered the smallest parish in terms of population (1355 residents), it is also one of the few interior parishes on the island, created from the disharmony between the local authorities (which forced the local governor to divide the original parish between Machico and Santo Cruz).

Machico has several primary schools, junior and senior secondary schools, banks, main post office and public square, along with public beaches.

== Speleology ==
The Furnas do Cavalum are a group of four cavities located in Machico and named after a local legend about a demon called Cavalum, who was imprisoned in the cave.

These lava tubes are of great importance allowing a view on the volcanic history of the now inactive island of Madeira, they have also biologic importance as there are several troglobiont living in the cave, including crustaceans, spiders and flies. At least fourteen invertebrates live in these tubes and at least three of them are endemic on Madeira island, one of them exists only in this cave.

Furnas do Cavalum are also part of the cultural heritage of the islanders, as numerous legends are told about the caves. Despite the stories about the demon, the cave was used as a refuge by the locals, namely during violent uprises like the Revolta da Madeira in April 1931.

== Climate ==
Machico has a very mild mediterranean climate with small temperature differences between seasons. It is slightly cooler than Funchal in all seasons, but is still very mild in winter and has stable and warm summers, where heat-waves are rare. There is a very low diurnal temperature variation with night-time lows above 20 °C (68 °F) being common in summer. The summer is also delayed in so-called seasonal lag. As a result, October is warmer than June in terms of daily mean temperature.

Climate data for Machico
Month	Jan	Feb	Mar	Apr	May	Jun	Jul	Aug	Sep	Oct	Nov	Dec	Year
Mean daily maximum °C (°F)	18 (64)	18 (64)	18 (64)	19 (66)	21 (70)	23 (73)	24 (75)	25 (77)	25 (77)	23 (73)	21 (70)	20 (68)	21 (70)
Daily mean °C (°F)	16 (61)	16 (61)	16 (61)	17 (63)	18 (64)	21 (70)	22 (72)	23 (73)	23 (73)	21 (70)	19 (66)	18 (64)	19 (66)
Mean daily minimum °C (°F)	14 (57)	14 (57)	14 (57)	14 (57)	16 (61)	17 (63)	19 (66)	20 (68)	20 (68)	19 (66)	17 (63)	15 (59)	17 (63)
Average precipitation mm (inches)	110 (4.3)	80 (3.1)	60 (2.4)	70 (2.8)	20 (0.8)	10 (0.4)	10 (0.4)	10 (0.4)	40 (1.6)	100 (3.9)	100 (3.9)	90 (3.5)	710 (28.0)
Source: Weatherbase

== Economy ==
The economy is focused on agriculture, tourism, and fishing, although a small number of businesses and commercial establishments have concentrated in the centre of town. The main harbour is a mixture of personal and public uses, that includes a lighted promenade, scenic landscapes of the town, as well as a small harbour that is used as a fishing port and public harbour (usually filled with yachts).

== Notable people ==
- António Sebastião Spínola (1875 in Porto da Cruz – 1956) an Inspector General of Finances for Oliveira Salazar
- José Ornelas Carvalho (born 1954 in Porto da Cruz) a prelate of the Roman Catholic Church & current Bishop of Setúbal.
- Miguel Fidalgo (born 1982 in Caniçal) a footballer with over 320 club caps
- Nuno Viveiros (born 1983 in Machico) a former footballer with 376 club caps
- Élio Martins (born 1985 in Machico) a footballer with over 300 club caps
