= Pico do Facho =

Portuguese mountain

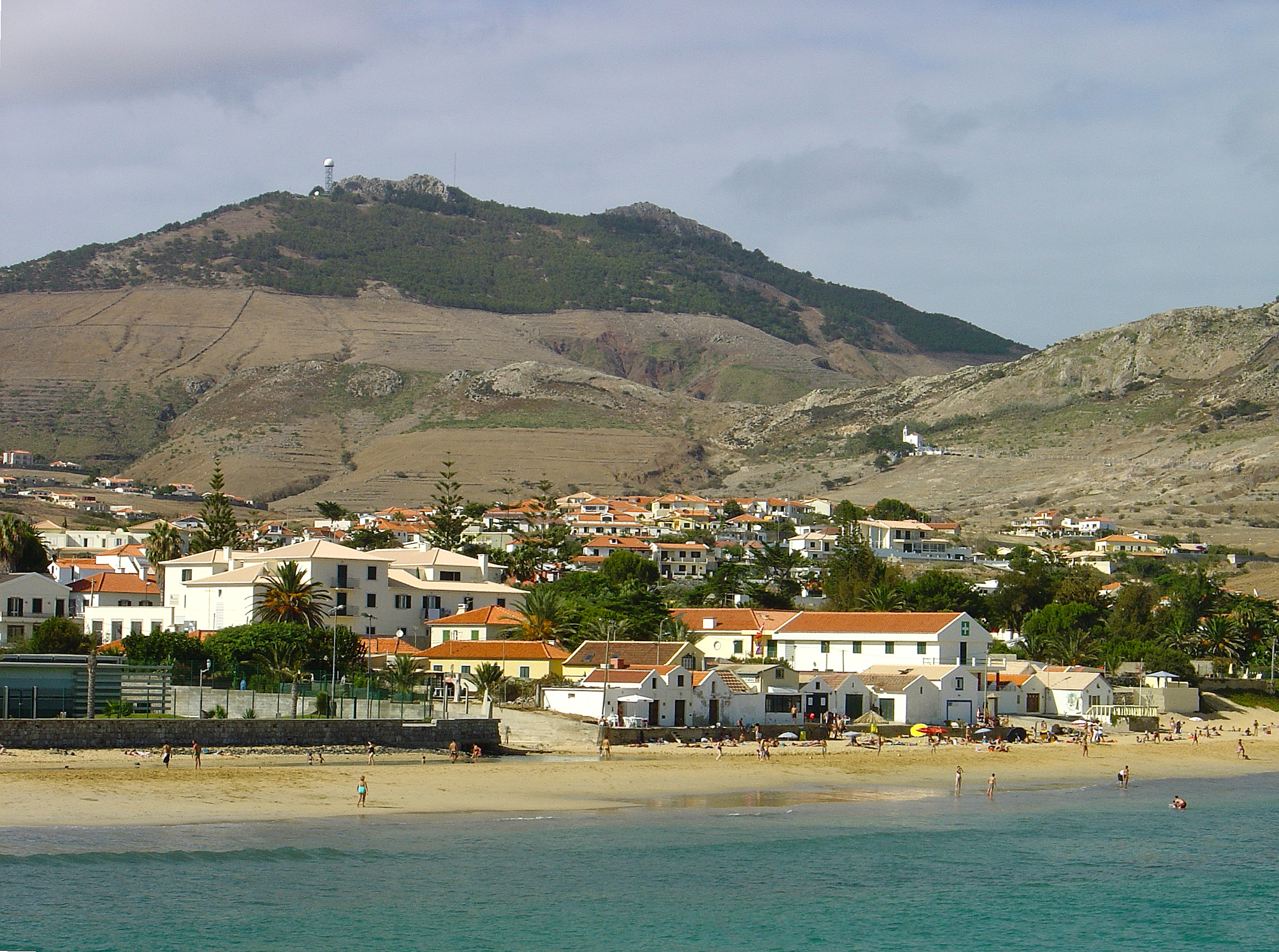
- View of Pico do Facho from Vila Baleira

Highest point
- Elevation: 517 m (1,696 ft)
- Coordinates: 33°05′03.5″N 16°19′25.3″W

Geography
- Location within Madeira
- Location: Porto Santo Island, Madeira, Portugal

Pico do Facho (European Portuguese pronunciation: [ˈpiku ðu ˈfaʃu]) is the highest peak on Porto Santo Island, with 517 m (1,696 ft) in altitude. Its name comes from facho, a light beam created by a bonfire, which was used to signal both the local population and Funchal of pirate ships. The bonfire could be seen from Ponta de São Lourenço on the main island of Madeira.

There are no roads leading to the top of the peak, however there is a path from Pico do Castelo to Pico do Facho and to some nearby peaks about 1.5 - 2 hours walk.
