= Anzia centrifuga =

Conservation status
- Endangered (IUCN 3.1)

Scientific classification
- Domain: Eukaryota
- Kingdom: Fungi
- Division: Ascomycota
- Class: Lecanoromycetes
- Order: Lecanorales
- Family: Parmeliaceae
- Genus: Anzia
- Species: A. centrifuga

Binomial name
- Anzia centrifuga Haugan (1992)

Species of lichen

Anzia centrifuga is a species of foliose lichen in the family Parmeliaceae. It is found only on one volcano on Porto Santo in the Madeira Archipelago, where it grows on rocks.

== Taxonomy ==
The lichen was described as a new discovered species in 1992 by Norwegian lichenologist Reidar Haugan. The type specimen was collected from Pico do Castelo on Porto Santo (Madeira Archipelago, Portugal). Here it was found growing on a sun-exposed rock at an altitude of 350 m (1,150 ft). The chondroid axis of the medulla indicate a placement in section Nervosae in genus Anzia.

== Description ==
The lichen thallus forms pale grey rosettes up to 30 cm (12 in) in diameter, although older parts of the thallus, like near the centre, tend to become darker. The lobes comprising the thallus are 1–2 mm wide and dichotomously branched. The lobes tend to become broader and rounded at the tips, which may also be pruinose from crystals of calcium oxalate. The thallus underside has a spongy layer (spongiostratum) that is hardly visible from the top. It is often grazed by snails or arthropods. Scattered black rhizines can develop from the chondroid axis of the medulla. Apothecia are quite common in this species. They are cup-shaped on a small stalk (pedicel), and measuring up to 10 mm (0.39 in) in diameter, with a red-brown to black disc that is shiny in young individuals. Asci contain numerous crescent-shaped ascospores with dimensions of 9–15 by 2–4 μm.

Secondary chemicals present in Anzia centrifuga include atranorin, divaricatic acid, and terpenoids.

== Habitat and distribution ==
Anzia centrifuga grows on dry, sun-exposed rock – the only member of the genus with this habitat preference. It is known only from a few localities on Pico do Castelo. Associated lichens include Ramalina species and Heterodermia leucomelos. Because of its small population (100-150 individuals), restricted distribution, and potential threats such as accidental extinction from tourism, fire, trampling, and grazing, in 2021 it was assessed as an endangered species on the IUCN Red List of Threatened Species. A 2017 study estimated its population to be 50–100 individuals, with a suitable potential habitat of less than one square kilometre.
