= Praia do Porto Santo =

Beach in Porto Santo, Madeira, Portugal

- Beach
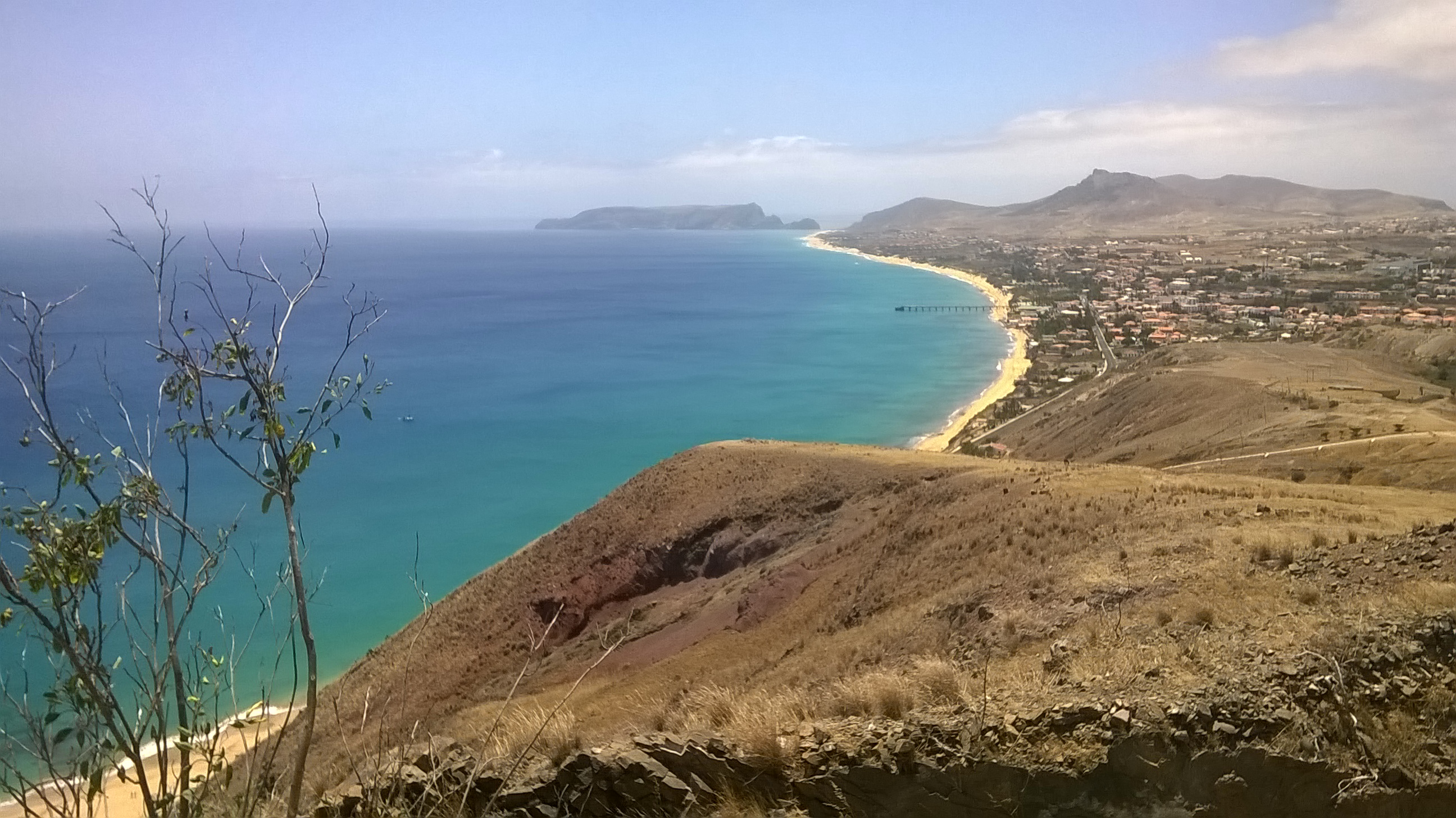
- The coastal beach of Porto Santo.

- Coordinates: 33°2′52.01″N 16°20′49.99″W
- Location: Porto Santo, Madeira, Portugal

Dimensions
  - Length: 9,200 metres (30,200 ft)

Praia de Porto Santo (English: Porto Santo Beach) is a beach located near the town Vila Baleira, on the island of Porto Santo, Portugal.

With a total length of nine kilometers, Porto Santo Beach is usually divided into areas for better administration: Calheta, Cabeço da Ponte, Ribeiro Cochino, Ribeiro Salgado, Fontinha and Penedo.

== History ==
The beach was recognised as one of the Seven Wonders of Portugal, beach category in 2012.

In August 2020 the President of Portugal Marcelo Rebelo de Sousa, holidayed in Porto Santo and swam at the beach to show that the island and beach are safe for tourists despite the COVID-19 pandemic.
