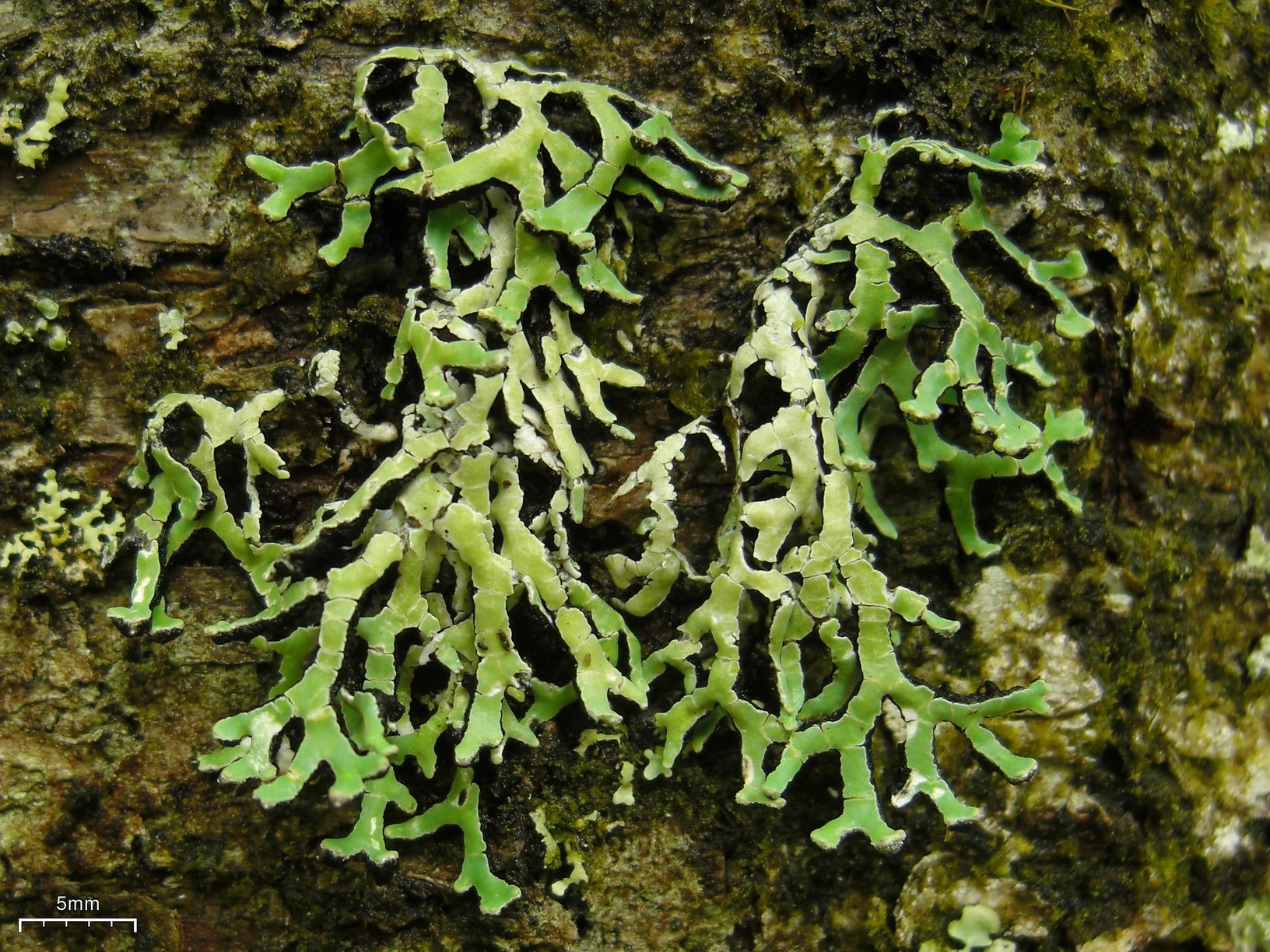
- Anzia colpodes

Scientific classification
- Domain: Eukaryota
- Kingdom: Fungi
- Division: Ascomycota
- Class: Lecanoromycetes
- Order: Lecanorales
- Family: Parmeliaceae
- Genus: Anzia; Stizenb. (1861)

Type species
- Anzia colpodes (Ach.) Stizenb. (1862)

Synonyms
- Chondrospora A.Massal. (1860)

= Anzia =

Genus of fungi

Anzia is a genus of foliose lichens known as black-foam lichens in the large family Parmeliaceae. It was formerly included in the monogeneric family Anziaceae, but this has since been subsumed into the Parmeliaceae.

== Taxonomy ==
The genus was circumscribed by Ernst Stizenberger in 1862, with Anzia colpodes assigned as the type species. This lichen was originally described as Lichen colpodes by Erik Acharius in 1799. The genus name honours Martino Anzi (1812–1883), an Italian botanist and professor of theology.

In 1932, Yasuhiko Asahina divided the genus into three sections (Simplices, Duplices, and Nervosae) based on the structure of the medulla. When Isao Yoshimura later observed that Anzia japonica had two medulla types in a single species (i.e. both a single-layered and a double-layered medulla), he combined sections Simplices and Duplices into section Anziae.

== Description ==
Members of Anzia have a foliose growth form, with a thallus that can measure anywhere from 2–30 cm (0.8–11.8 in) wide. The narrow lobes that comprise the thallus are pale greyish white to greyish green in colour. It is one of the only groups in the family not to have eight spores in each ascus, but instead has numerous spores in each ascus (varying slightly from ascus to ascus). These ascospores are crescent shaped. A characteristic of the genus is the presence of a brown-black or pale brown spongy cushion called a spongiostratum, which covers the lower surface.

Pannoparmelia also has a spongiostratum, but in this genus the asci contain eight ascospores, and the upper cortex is yellow-green.

== Distribution ==
The genus has a cosmopolitan distribution, but is concentrated in the Northern Hemisphere, particularly in Japan. Species of Anzia are typically found at eletvations between 1,000 and 4,000 m (3,300 and 13,100 ft) in subtropical or temperate latitudes of both hemispheres. They show a strong preference for growing on tree bark, particularly on Pinus (pine), Quercus (oak), and Rhododendron species. In montane and subalpine regions, they can also be found on Abies (fir), Picea (spruce), and occasionally on other woody substrates. While most species are epiphytic (growing on bark), some can rarely be found growing on rock surfaces in temperate mountain environments.

== Evolutionary history ==
A fossilized Anzia, Anzia electra, was found in 35–40 Myr-old Baltic amber. Its features suggest that the main distinguishing characteristics in the thallus morphology of section Anzia have been retained for tens of millions of years.

== Species ==
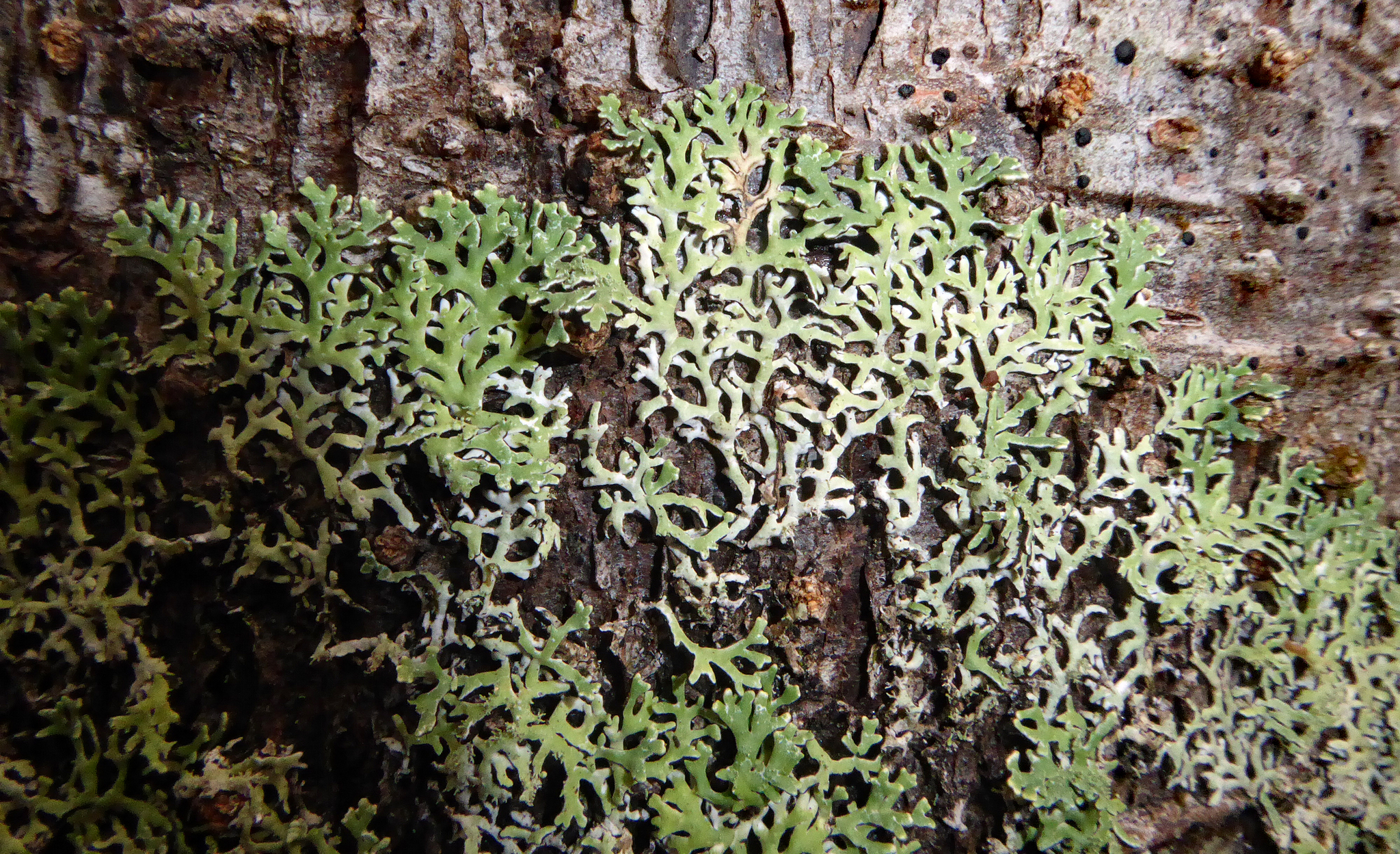
Anzia entingiana

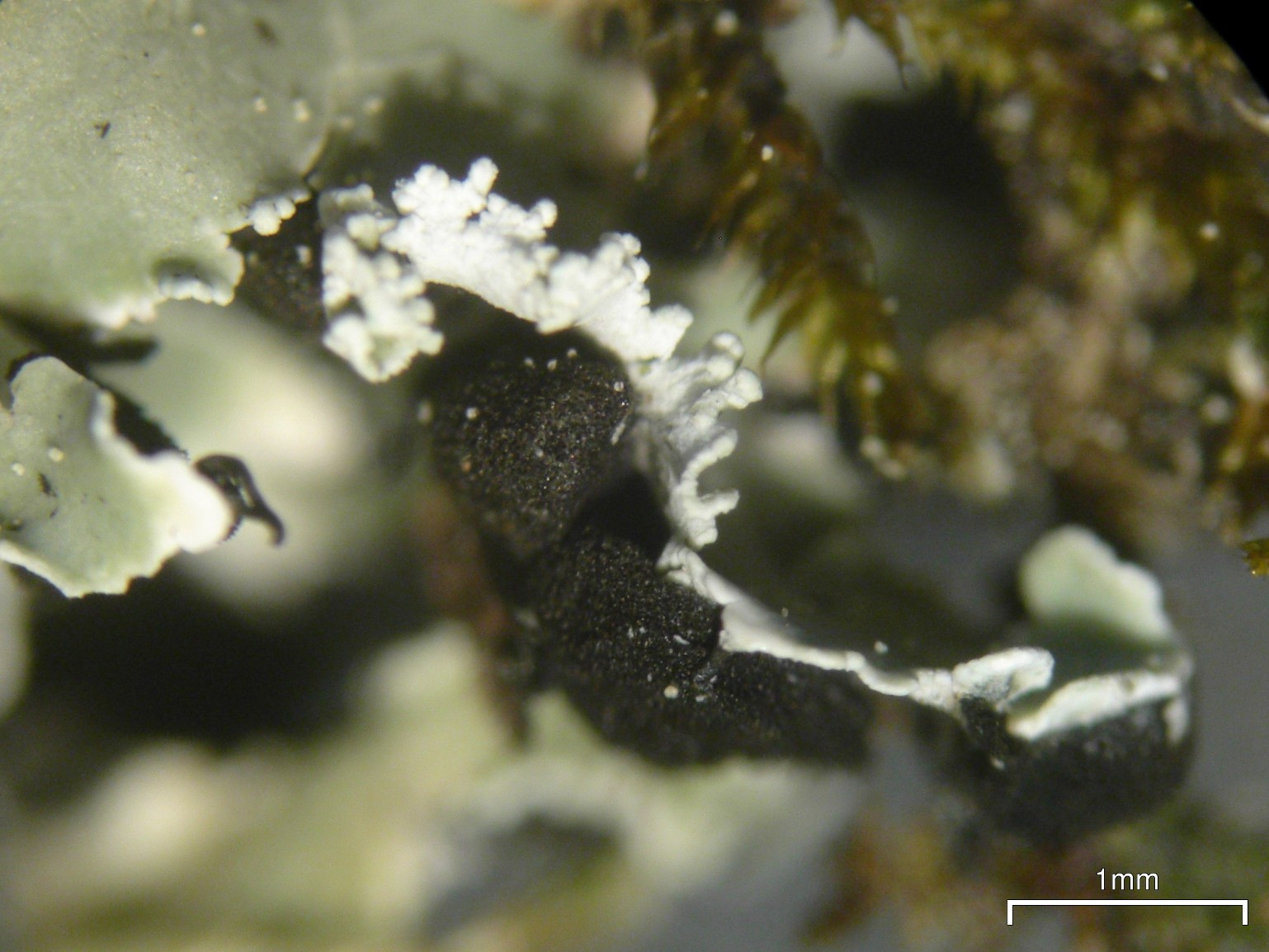
Side view of Anzia ornata, showing the black spongiostratum on the lobe underside

- Anzia afromontana R.Sant. (1986)
- Anzia americana Yoshim. & Sharp (1968)
- Anzia centrifuga Haugan (1992) – Porto Santo, Madeira
- Anzia colpodes (sack black-foam lichen) (Ach.) Stizenb. (1862)
- Anzia colpota Vain. (1921)
- Anzia electra† Rikkinen & Poinar (2002)
- Anzia endoflavida Yoshim. (1995)
- Anzia entingiana Elix (1997) – New Zealand
- Anzia flavotenuis Jayalal, Wolseley & Aptroot (2012) – Sri Lanka
- Anzia formosana Asahina (1937)
- Anzia gallowayi Elix (2007) – Australia
- Anzia hypoleucoides Müll.Arg. (1891)
- Anzia hypomelaena (Zahlbr.) Xin Y.Wang & Li S.Wang (2015) – China
- Anzia isidiolenta Diederich & Sipman (1995)
- Anzia isidiosa Yoshim. (1995) – New Guinea
- Anzia jamesii D.J.Galloway (1978)
- Anzia japonica (Tuck.) Müll.Arg. (1889) – China; Japan
- Anzia leucobatoides (Nyl.) Zahlbr. (1907) – China
- Anzia mahaeliyensis Jayalal, Wolseley & Aptroot (2012) – Sri Lanka
- Anzia minor Yoshim. (1992)
- Anzia opuntiella Müll.Arg. (1881) – Asia
- Anzia ornata (Zahlbr.) Asahina (1937) – Asia; North America
- Anzia pseudocolpota Xin Y.Wang & Li S.Wang (2015) – China
- Anzia rhabdorhiza Li S.Wang & M.M.Liang (2012) – China
- Anzia tianjarana Yoshim. & Elix (1992) – Australia
