= Filipa Moniz Perestrelo =

Portuguese noblewoman (born 1455)

- Born: c. 1455; Porto Santo Island, Madeira, Kingdom of Portugal
- Died: between 1479–1484 (aged 24–29)
- Spouse: Christopher Columbus (m. 1479)
- Children: Diego Columbus
- Parent(s): Bartolomeu Perestrello; Isabel Moniz

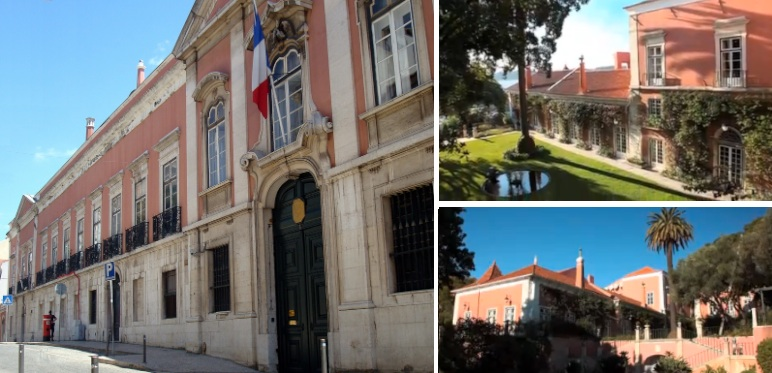
Todos-os-Santos All Saints Monastery of the Order of Santiago, Lisbon where Filipa used to live, today houses the French Embassy.

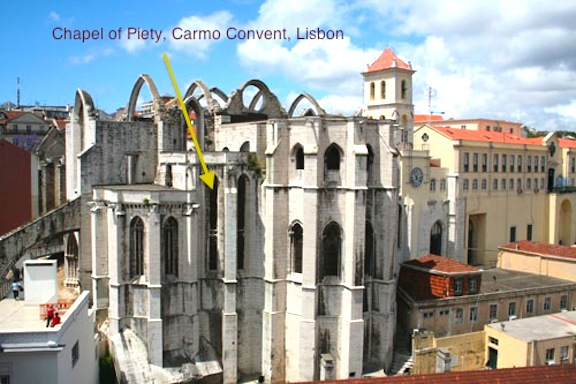
Capela da Piedade (Chapel of Piety) at Carmo, Lisbon where Filipa was buried.

Filipa Moniz Perestrelo (born c. 1455; died between 1479 and 1484) was a Portuguese noblewoman from Porto Santo Island, in the Madeira archipelago, Portugal. She married Christopher Columbus in 1479 at Vila Baleira on the island.

== History ==
Filipa Moniz Perestrelo was the daughter of Isabel Moniz and Bartolomeu Perestrello. Prior to marrying she was one of the twelve elite Comendadoras of the Monastery of All Saints in Lisbon of the Military Order of St. James, which means she had a comendary. Her step son Ferdinand Columbus and her brother-in-law Bartholomew Columbus, described her as a "noble Comendadora" residing in the Monastery of All Saints.

=== Marriage ===
Discussing the question of how Christopher Columbus, the son of a Genoese wool weaver, could marry the daughter of a Portuguese Knight of Santiago, a member of the household of Prince John, Lord of Reguengos de Monsaraz (Master of Santiago) and of Prince Henry the Navigator's household, Samuel Eliot Morison wrote that this is "no great mystery." Filipa was "already about 25 years old," her mother was a widow "with slender means," and "her mother was glad enough to have no more convent bills to pay, and a son-in-law [...] who asked for no dowry."

Another view is presented by Portuguese professor Joel Silva Ferreira Mata, who researched All-Saints and its residents. According to him, as "member" of the Order of Santiago, in order for Filipa to marry the future Admiral Columbus, she, like all members, required authorization from Santiago's Master, because, like all other religious and military orders, the Order of Santiago had its established rules and protocols by which it was governed. The Master of Santiago from 1470 to 1492, thus governing at the time of Filipa's marriage, was King John II of Portugal. From this marriage was born Diego Columbus in 1479 or 1480 who went on to become 2nd Admiral of the Indies, 2nd Viceroy of the Indies and 4th Governor of the Indies, and who married King Fernando's cousin, María de Toledo y Rojas. Thus Filipa Moniz was daughter of a King's Captain, wife of a Viceroy and mother of another Viceroy.

=== Interment ===
Filipa's fate is unknown and it is uncertain whether she had died before Columbus left Portugal, nor is her cause of death known. Current scholarship places her death sometime between 1479 and 1484. She was buried in the Capela da Piedade (Chapel of Piety), which is the first chapel to the right of the main chapel in the Carmo Convent in Lisbon along with her half-sister, Iseu Perestrelo and her brother-in-law, Pedro Correia da Cunha.

== See also ==
- People from Madeira
- Rafael Perestrello, a cousin of Filipa Moniz who was among the first Europeans to land in China (via the South China Sea) during the Chinese Ming Dynasty
