= Porto Santo Airport =

Porto Santo Airport Aeroporto de Porto Santo

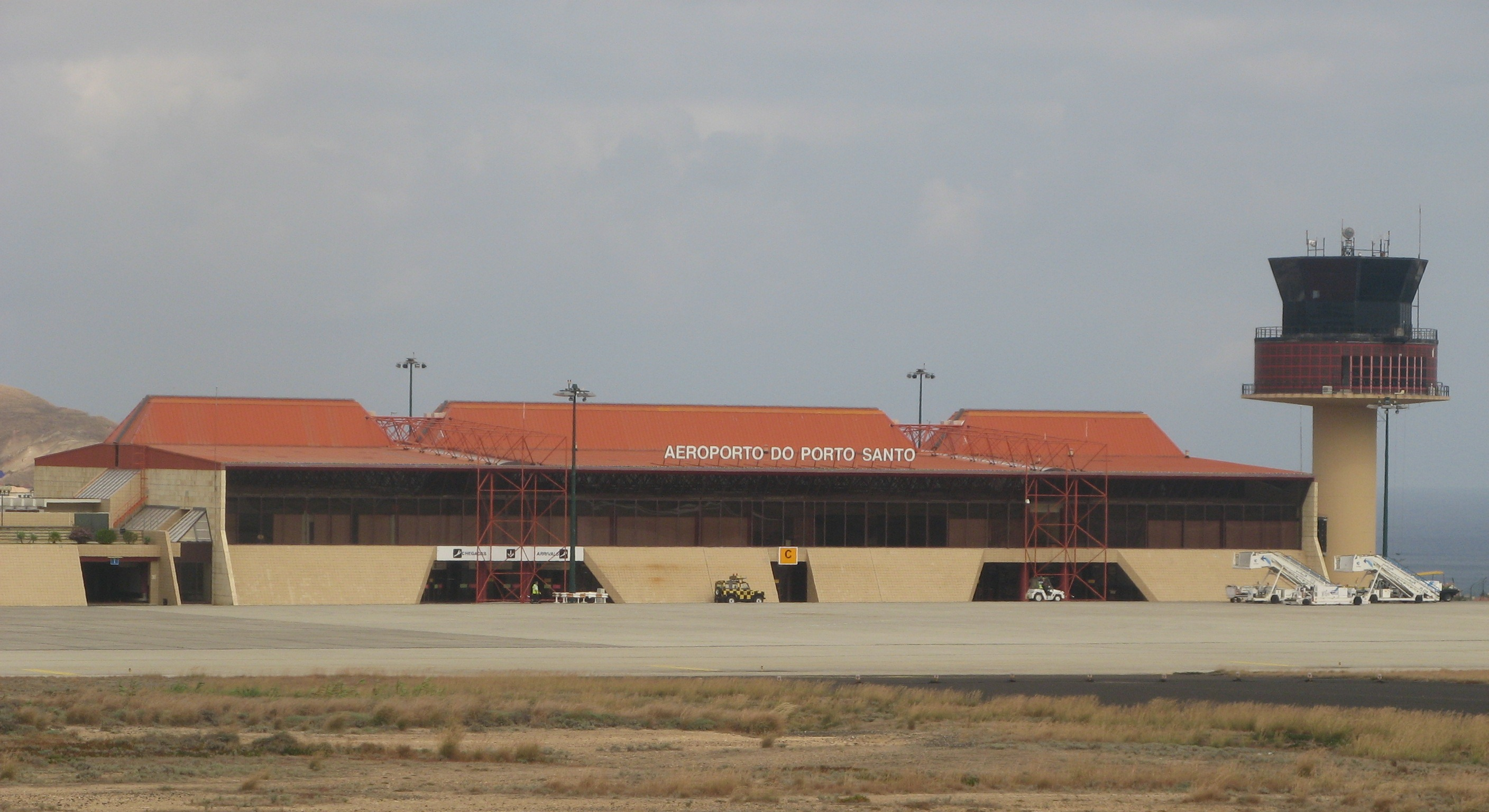
- IATA: PXO; ICAO: LPPS

Summary
- Airport type: Military/public
- Serves: Porto Santo Island
- Location: Vila Baleira
- Elevation AMSL: 103 m / 338 ft
- Coordinates: 33°04′15″N 016°20′59″W
- Website: ana.pt

Map
- Location in Madeira archipelago

Runways
| Direction | Length | | Surface |
| Direction | m | ft | Surface |
|---|---|---|---|
| 36/18 | 3,000 | 9,843 | Asphalt/concrete |

Statistics (2017 )
- Passengers (provisional): 175,300
- Passengers change 16-17: ▲12.3%
- Aircraft movements (2016): 2,077
- Sources: Portuguese AIP

Porto Santo Airport (Portuguese: Aeroporto de Porto Santo) (IATA: PXO, ICAO: LPPS) is an international airport located in Vila Baleira, the capital of Porto Santo Island, Madeira.

The military Maneuver Aerodrome n.° 3 (Aeródromo de Manobra n.º 3) or AM3 is co-located within the limits of civilian Porto Santo Airport.

== History ==
The island of Porto Santo was the first of the Madeira Islands to obtain an airport. In 1959, its runway was built with an initial length of 2,000 m (6,600 ft). The first aircraft to land at this airport was a TAP Air Portugal Douglas DC-4, on 20 July 1960.

The airport's infrastructure has improved over time, with increases to the runway length and in ramp surface. The last improvements to the airport structure were finalized on 28 August 1995, with the inauguration of a new passenger terminal and a new increase in runway length, which then reached 3,000 m (9,800 ft). The runway was also re-paved.

== Management ==
Porto Santo Airport is managed by ANA Aeroportos de Portugal.

== Facilities ==
The airport has a 3,000 m × 45 m (9,843 ft × 148 ft) asphalt/concrete runway, with no ILS equipment as of 2011, but with VOR and NDB approaches available.

== Military air base ==
The Maneuver Aerodrome no 3 (AM3) is a Portuguese Air Force forward air base which shares its aeronautical facilities with the Porto Santo Airport. The AM3 was created in 2009 by the transformation of the previous Madeira Air Detachment. It does not have permanently based flying squadrons, but supports permanent detachments of the Squadron 502 (EADS CASA C-295 aircraft) and Squadron 751 (AgustaWestland EH101 helicopters), which focus in search and rescue missions.

== Airlines and destinations ==
The following airlines operate regular scheduled and charter flights at Porto Santo Airport:

| Airlines | Destinations |
|---|---|
| AlbaStar | Seasonal: Milan-Bergamo |
| Binter Canarias | Funchal |
| easyJet | Lisbon; Seasonal: Porto |
| Luxair | Luxembourg |
| Privilege Style | Seasonal charter: Porto |
| Smartwings | Seasonal charter: Lisbon, Porto, Prague |
| TAP Air Portugal | Seasonal: Lisbon |

== See also ==
- List of airports in Portugal
