= Anzia pseudocolpota =

Scientific classification
- Kingdom: Fungi
- Division: Ascomycota
- Class: Lecanoromycetes
- Order: Lecanorales
- Family: Parmeliaceae
- Genus: Anzia
- Species: A. pseudocolpota

Binomial name
- Anzia pseudocolpota Xin Y.Wang & Li S.Wang (2015)

Species of lichen

Anzia pseudocolpota is a little-known species of corticolous (bark-dwelling), foliose lichen in the family Parmeliaceae. It was first described as a new species in 2015 from specimens collected in the mountains of south-western China. The lichen is distinguished by its distinctive black central cord running through the middle and its growth on the bark of conifers and other trees in cool mountain forests.

== Taxonomy ==
Anzia pseudocolpota was introduced as a new species in 2015 by Xin Y. Wang and Li S. Wang during a revision of Anzia from China. The protologue diagnoses the taxon by the combination of a dark cylindrical central axis in the medulla, a discontinuous 'spongy cushion' (spongiostratum) on the lower surface, and the production of divaricatic acid—features that set it apart from the superficially similar A. colpota. The holotype was collected on 15 June 2013 at 3350 m elevation on Loranthus bark on Lidiping Mountain, Weixi County, Yunnan Province, south-western China.

== Description ==
The thallus forms a small, leaf-like (foliose) rosette up to about 6 cm across. Lobes are initially narrow (0.5–1 mm) but broaden to 1–2 mm, ending in rounded, hand-shaped tips that are dusted with a white crystalline bloom (pruina). A single white medullary layer encloses a conspicuous black central axis—a firm cord of fungal tissue that runs between the medulla and the spongy cushion. Below, the thallus carries a black, cottony spongy cushion that may break into rounded or patchy areas, especially near the lobe tips; older lobes sometimes lose the cushion in their centres, leaving the axis exposed. Short black root-like strands (rhizines) occur sparingly and usually in bundles of three to five.

Disc-shaped fruiting bodies (apothecia) are frequent on the upper surface. They have chestnut-brown discs 1–6 mm across, a yellowish epihymenium, and a colourless hymenium about 70–80 μm tall. Each bitunicate ascus contains numerous curved, colourless ascospores that average 13–15 × 2–3 μm. Chemical tests show atranorin in the cortex (K+ yellow) and divaricatic acid in the medulla (C−, KC−).

== Habitat and distribution ==
Anzia pseudocolpota inhabits cool, moist subalpine forests between about 2500 and 3700 m elevation. It grows epiphytically on the bark of conifers (Larix, Picea) and broad-leaved hosts such as Quercus and Rhododendron. The species is so far known only from south-western China, specifically Sichuan and Yunnan Provinces, within the southern Hengduan Mountains region.
