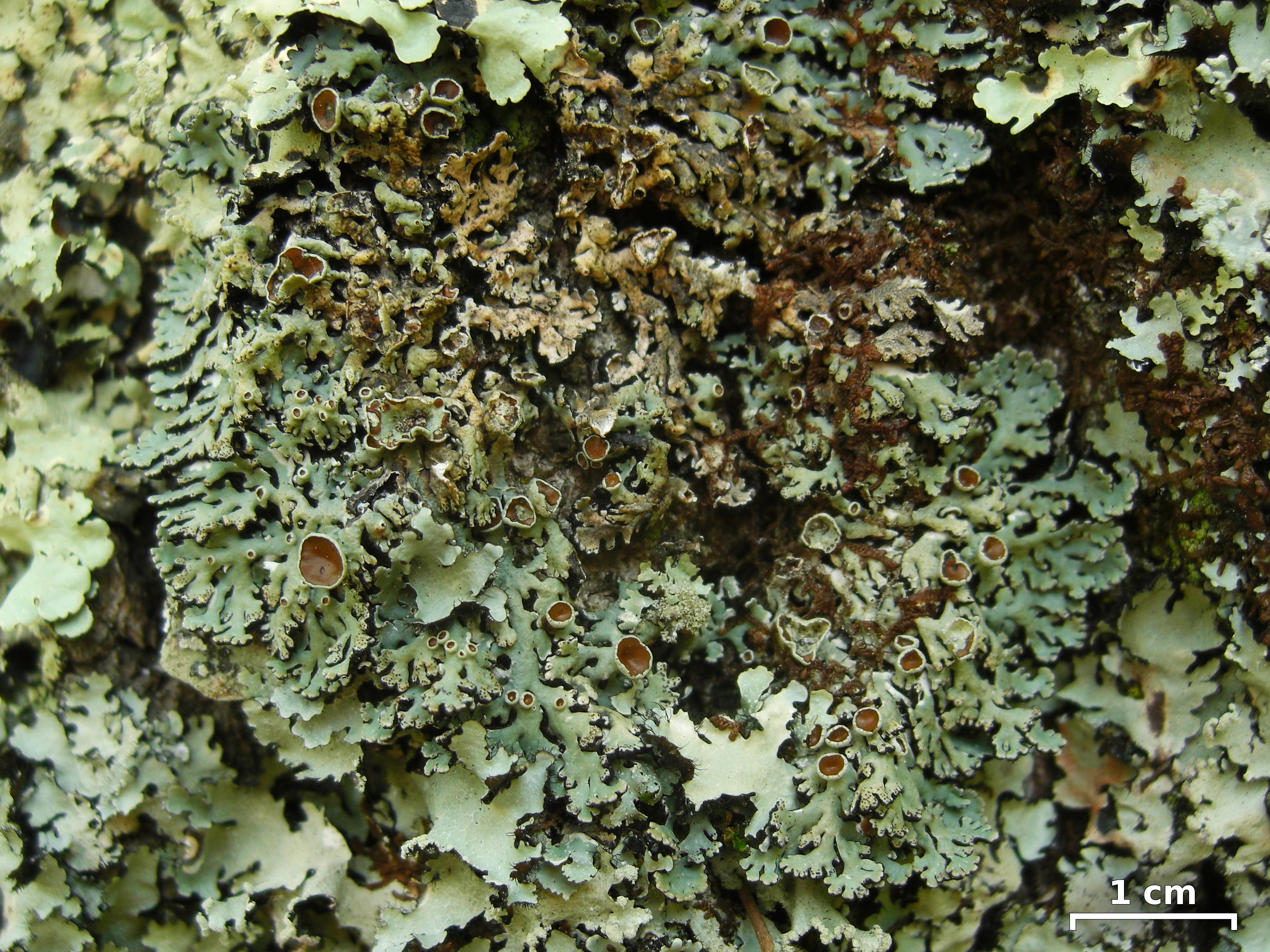

Conservation status
- Apparently Secure (NatureServe)

Scientific classification
- Domain: Eukaryota
- Kingdom: Fungi
- Division: Ascomycota
- Class: Lecanoromycetes
- Order: Lecanorales
- Family: Parmeliaceae
- Genus: Anzia
- Species: A. colpodes

Binomial name
- Anzia colpodes (Ach.) Stizenb. (1862)

Synonyms
- Lichen colpodes Ach. (1799); Parmelia colpodes (Ach.) Ach. (1803); Lichen diatrypus * colpodes (Ach.) Lam. (1813)

= Anzia colpodes =

Species of lichen

Anzia colpodes, commonly known as the black foam lichen, is a species of corticolous (bark-dwelling), foliose lichen in the large family Parmeliaceae. It occurs in eastern North America.

== Taxonomy ==
The lichen was first formally described as a new species by the Swedish lichenologist Erik Acharius in 1799. He classified it in the eponymous genus Lichen, which was standard at the time. In 1803 he transferred it to the genus Parmelia. Ernst Stizenberger transferred it to the genus Anzia in 1862.
