= Bartolomeu Perestrello =

Portuguese navigator and explorer (c. 1395–1457)

- Born: c. 1395; Kingdom of Portugal
- Died: 1457; Porto Santo
- Occupations: Explorer, colonial administrator
- Spouses: Margarida Martins; Branca Dias; Brites Furtado de Mendonça; Isabel Moniz
- Children: various, including Filipa

Bartolomeu Perestrello (Portuguese pronunciation: [baɾtuluˈmew pɨɾɨʃˈtɾelu], in Italian Bartolomeo Perestrello), 1st Capitão Donatário, Lord and Governor of the Island of Porto Santo (c. 1395 – 1457) was a Portuguese navigator and explorer that is claimed to have discovered and populated Porto Santo Island (1419) together with João Gonçalves Zarco and Tristão Vaz Teixeira. The account of his participation in the discovery is disputed by some historians.

He was the father-in-law of Christopher Columbus.

== Biography ==
He was the grandson of Micer Gabriele Pallastrelli, a Lombard nobleman from Piacenza, and his second wife Bertolina Bracciforti. He was a Nobleman of John I of Portugal, who recognized his Coat of Arms and made him a Nobleman in 1433; he was married to Caterina Visconti (of Verona), with whom he came to Portugal in 1385, and in 1437 was granted two houses at the Sub-Ripas Street in the City of Coimbra. Nobleman and Fidalgo-Esquire of the House of Infante João, Lord of Reguengos and master of the Portuguese Order of Saint James (Santiago), he was granted in 1446, as a hereditary fief (capitania), the island of Porto Santo and, together with his fellow fleet commanders, João Gonçalves Zarco and Tristão Vaz Teixeira, began settling both Porto Santo and Madeira.

One of his daughters, Filipa Moniz Perestrelo (born c. 1455), around 1479 married Christopher Columbus, who lived in Madeira and Porto Santo.

A legend attributes the responsibility for the poor vegetation of Porto Santo to him. On his first disembarkation in the island he brought one pregnant doe-rabbit that escaped and its progeny overran the island in a few years. The island was poor in water, and what seemed to be a good enterprise for him became the cause of his family's financial ruin.

== Family ==
Bartolomeu Perestrelo I, the first donatary captain of Porto Santo, played a significant role in the early Portuguese exploration of the Atlantic islands. He was married four times. His first marriage, to Margarida Martins, produced no known children. His second wife, Branca Dias, gave birth to Branca Dias Perestrelo, who served as a lady-in-waiting to Eleanor of Aragon, Queen of Portugal, and became the mistress of Dom Pedro de Noronha, the fourth Archbishop of Lisbon (1424–1452).

In 1446, Perestrelo married Beatriz Furtado de Mendonça, aunt of Ana de Mendonça, mistress of John II of Portugal. They had three known surviving daughters: Catarina Furtado de Mendonça, who married Mem Rodrigues de Vasconcelos, a grandson of João Gonçalves Zarco, Filipa de Mendonça, who married João Teixeira, son of Tristão Vaz Teixeira, and lasty Iseu Perestrelo, wife of Pedro Correia, first donatary captain of Graciosa Island, in the Azores Archipelago. His fourth and final marriage, to Isabel Moniz, daughter of Gil Aires, produced several children, including Filipa Moniz Perestrelo, one of the twelve Comendadoras of Santiago, who married Christopher Columbus; Violante, who wed Miguel Molyarte and resided in Seville, Spain; and Bartolomeu Perestrelo II, second Captain of Porto Santo, who married Guiomar Teixeira, daughter of the first donatary captain of Machico.

He was the brother of Rafael Perestrello, head of the Perestrellos of Torres Vedras. He also had two sisters: Catarina Perestrello, married to Aires Anes de Beja, Escrivão da Puridade (a Secretary) of John I, King of Portugal.

== See also ==
- Rafael Perestrello
