= Anzia gallowayi =

Scientific classification
- Kingdom: Fungi
- Division: Ascomycota
- Class: Lecanoromycetes
- Order: Lecanorales
- Family: Parmeliaceae
- Genus: Anzia
- Species: A. gallowayi

Binomial name
- Anzia gallowayi Elix (2007)
- Type locality: Hunua Ranges, New Zealand

Species of lichen-forming fungus

Anzia gallowayi is a species of corticolous (bark-dwelling) foliose lichen in the family Parmeliaceae. It was described in 2007 by John Elix and named in honour of the New Zealand lichenologist David Galloway. Known only from its type locality in the Hunua Ranges of New Zealand's North Island, it forms small, pale grey patches on the bark of kauri.

== Taxonomy ==
Anzia gallowayi was described by John Elix as a new species in 2007 and named in honour of the New Zealand lichenologist David Galloway. The holotype was collected in the Hunua Ranges, North Auckland (North Island), where it grew on the bark of Agathis australis (kauri). In describing the species, Elix compared it chiefly with the Australian A. minor, which shares the narrow lobes and bead-like (moniliform) undersurface but differs in growing on rock rather than bark, lacking isidia, and having different medullary compounds. He also distinguished A. gallowayi from the Papua New Guinean A. pseudoangustata, another bark-dwelling species with a bead-like spongiostratum, by its sparse isidia and different chemistry. Elix further noted that pale, shade-grown material of Pannoparmelia wilsonii could be mistaken for it, but that species has denser, cylindrical isidia and lacks atranorin and chloroatranorin in the upper cortex.

== Description ==
The lichen forms loose, pale grey patches about 1–2.5 cm wide on bark. Its lobes are narrow, separate, and repeatedly branched, and the upper surface is smooth and only sparsely dotted with tiny spherical isidia. The medulla is white. The underside surface is pale between the dark, bead-like cushions of the spongiostratum—a distinctive, bead-like layer that forms dark brown to black, spherical to ellipsoid cushions up to about 1.0 mm thick. Rhizines (root-like attachment hairs) are simple and scattered, up to about 1.2 mm long, tufted at their tips and inserted singly along the edge of the spongiostratum. No apothecia and pycnidia (sexual and asexual reproductive structures) have been reported. Spot tests give a K+ (yellow) reaction in the cortex, while the medulla is K−, C−, and P−. The main reported lichen products are atranorin and chloroatranorin (minor) in the cortex, and divaricatic acid (major) in the medulla.

== Habitat and distribution ==
Anzia gallowayi grows on bark and was known at the time of description only from the original collection made at the type locality in the Hunua Ranges of New Zealand's North Island. In a 2012 assessment of the conservation status of New Zealand lichens, A. gallowayi was listed as "data deficient"; this status had not been changed in a 2018 update.
