= Anzia colpota =

Scientific classification
- Domain: Eukaryota
- Kingdom: Fungi
- Division: Ascomycota
- Class: Lecanoromycetes
- Order: Lecanorales
- Family: Parmeliaceae
- Genus: Anzia
- Species: A. colpota

Binomial name
- Anzia colpota Vain. (1921)

Species of lichen

Anzia colpota is a species of foliose lichen in the family Parmeliaceae. In Japanese, it is known as アンチゴケモドキ (anchi-goke-modoki). It occurs in East Asia, generally at elevations between 2,000 and 3,500 metres.

== Taxonomy ==
The species was formally described as new to science in 1921 by the Finnish lichenologist Edvard August Vainio. The type specimen was collected by Atsushi Yasuda from Gamō, in Rikuzen Province, Japan. In his original description, Vainio characterised the species by its thallus, which is frequently divided into dichotomous segments measuring 0.7 to 2 mm wide. He noted that these segments are flat at their tips but otherwise convex, with a whitish-glaucescent colouration that becomes paler toward the tips. Vainio documented that the upper surface produces a yellowish reaction when treated with potassium hydroxide solution (i.e., the K test), while showing no internal reaction. He described the lower surface as blackish with very sparse rhizines of the same colour. In establishing this new species, Vainio distinguished it from Parmelia colpode (now Anzia colpodes, the type of genus Anzia) based on its distinctive K+ reaction on the upper surface.

Anzia colpota closely resembles the North American species A. colpodes, which is also the type species. However, they can be distinguished chemically, as A. colpodes lacks sekikaic acid. In 1961, William Culberson proposed that they should be considered the same species. However, molecular analysis indicates that they are distinct, as they belong to separate clades within the genus Anzia.

== Description ==
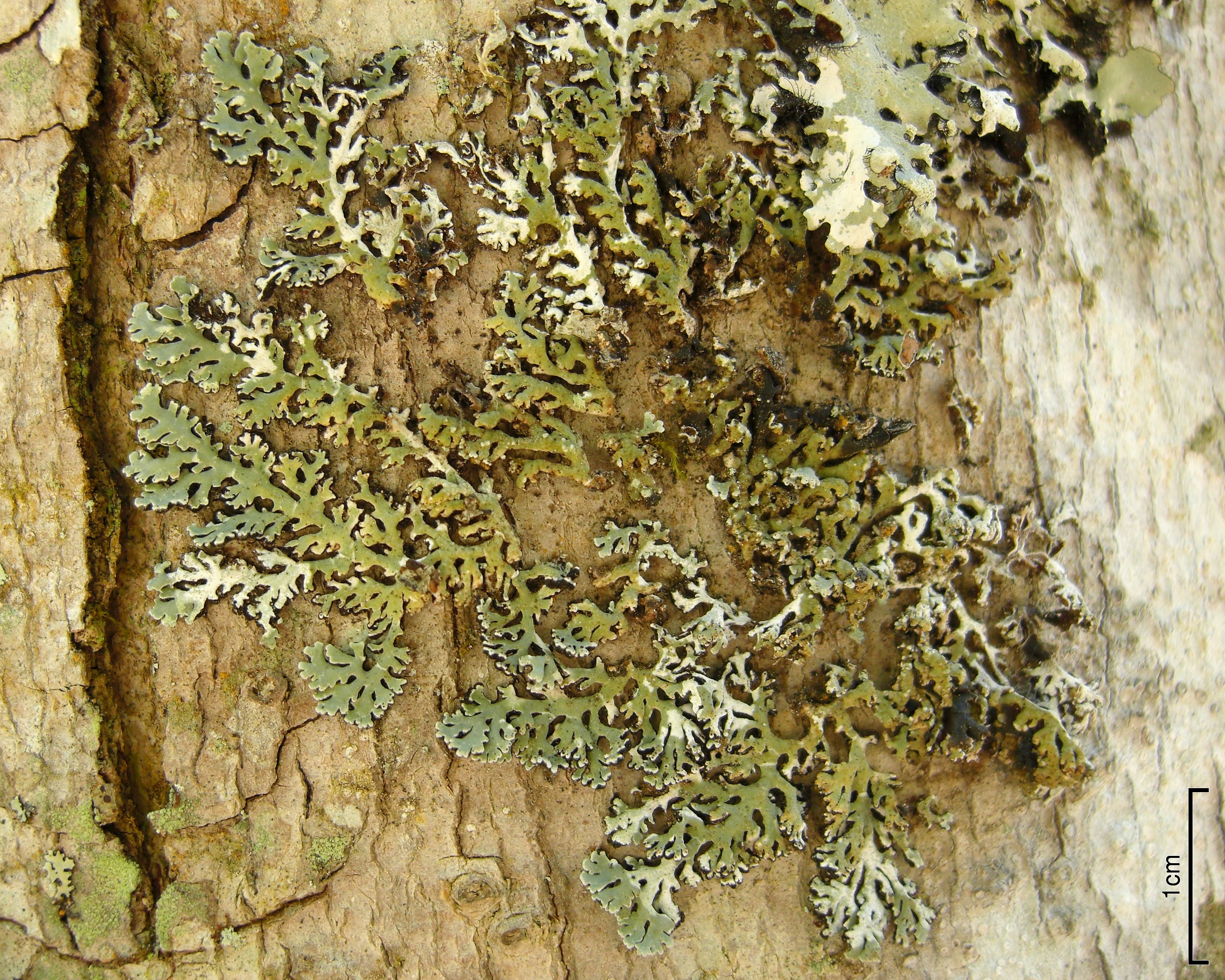
Anzia colpota is visually indistinguishable from the North American Anzia colpodes, shown here.

Anzia colpota has a combination of physical and chemical traits that distinguish it from others in its genus. The upper surface of the thallus has a frosted, powdery (pruinose) look, while its lobes grow in a palmate pattern (i.e., palm-shaped, with lobes stemming from the branch), with densely branched tips. Internally, its medulla is made up of a single layer that contains two secondary metabolites (lichen products): divaricatic acid and sekikaic acid.

Anzia colpota bears a superficial resemblance to A. japonica, but some key features distinguish the two species. Whereas A. japonica has a central axis and develops a distinctive spongy cushion on its lower surface that forms discrete, rounded patches, A. colpota lacks these characteristics and instead has a continuous lower layer. The species also differ in their chemical composition: A. japonica contains anziaic acid, which produces a red reaction with C (calcium hypochlorite), whereas A. colpota contains divaricatic and sekikaic acids instead.

== Habitat and distribution ==
Anzia colpota is found in East Asia, with populations documented in Japan, Korea, and China. In China, the species is primarily concentrated in the Hengduan Mountains region. The lichen typically grows on tree bark, showing a particular affinity for Pinus (pine), Quercus (oak), and Rhododendron species. It occurs at montane to subalpine elevations, generally between 2,000 and 3,500 metres above sea level.
