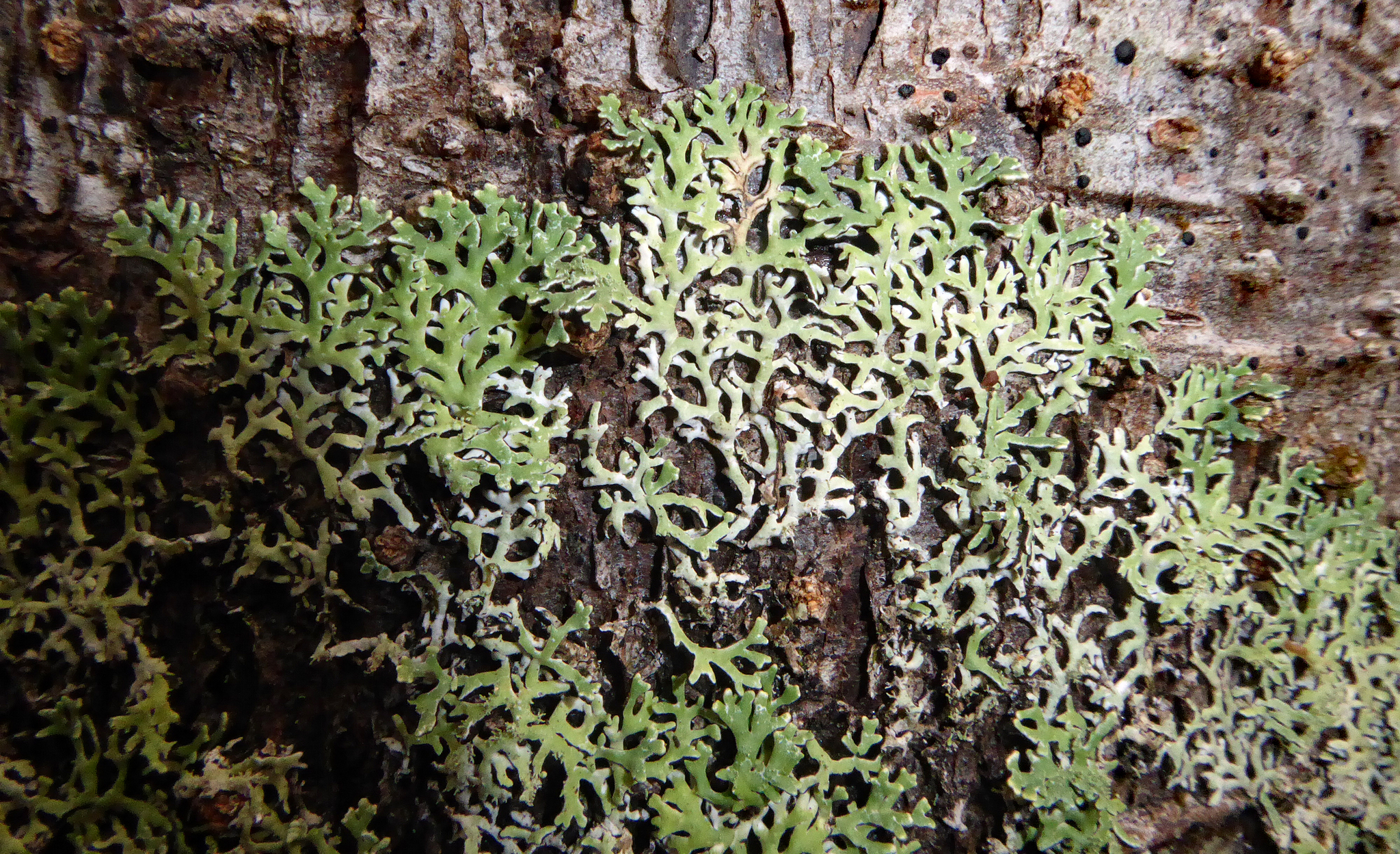

Scientific classification
- Kingdom: Fungi
- Division: Ascomycota
- Class: Lecanoromycetes
- Order: Lecanorales
- Family: Parmeliaceae
- Genus: Anzia
- Species: A. entingiana

Binomial name
- Anzia entingiana Elix (1997)
- Holotype: Swanson, New Zealand

= Anzia entingiana =

Species of lichen

Anzia entingiana is a species of corticolous (bark-dwelling) foliose lichen in the family Parmeliaceae. Found only in New Zealand, this lichen grows on tree bark in northern parts of the North Island, including kauri forests and coastal areas. It was described as a new species in 1997 by the Australian lichenologist John Elix in honour of the New Zealand lichenologist and photographer Brian Enting. The species forms small, pale grey patches with narrow lobes and produces tall, slender reproductive structures (isidia) that help distinguish it from related species.

== Taxonomy ==
Anzia entingiana was described by John Elix in 1997 and named in honour of the New Zealand lichenologist and photographer Brian Enting (1945–1995). Elix separated it from the other New Zealand endemic species in the genus, A. jamesii. Both are small, corticolous members of Anzia, but A. entingiana has narrower, convex lobes and tall, slender isidia that are not pruinose at the tips, and it contains protocetraric acid in the medulla. By contrast, A. jamesii has broader, flatter lobes, thicker and shorter isidia with pruinose tips, and anziacic acid with 4-O-methylhypoprotocetraric acid. Some sparsely isidiate material had been confused with A. madagascariensis, a species now regarded as absent from New Zealand; that taxon lacks isidia and has fumarprotocetraric acid rather than protocetraric acid.

== Description ==
The thallus is bark-dwelling, adnate to loosely attached, forming small, circular to spreading patches about 2–5 cm across. Lobes are linear, separate to crowded and dichotomously to subdichotomously branched, 0.4–1.2 mm wide. The upper surface is pale grey to pale grey-green (often whitish at the margins), convex and smooth, conspicuously spotted (maculate and often with faint transverse cracking. Isidia are present and vary from sparse to dense; they are cylindrical, simple at first and later branched to form small coralloid clusters. The medulla is white and shows a chondroid axis of parallel, longitudinal hyphae in the centre of the lobes.

The lower surface bears a continuous spongiostratum that commonly projects slightly beyond the lobe edges; it is solid, dark brown to black and is attached uniformly to the lower medullary hyphae or chondroid strand. Rhizines are scattered, simple or tufted. Apothecia and pycnidia were not seen. Standard chemical spot tests yield the following reactions: cortex K+ (yellow); medulla K–, C–, P+ (orange-red). Identified substances include atranorin and chloroatranorin (minor) in the cortex and protocetraric acid (major) with trace virensic acid in the medulla.

== Habitat and distribution ==
Anzia entingiana is a corticolous (bark-dwelling) lichen. The type was collected at low elevation near Swanson (Waitemata, North Island) on kauri, and additional specimens are from northern parts of the North Island (e.g., Kaitaia, Radar Bush, Whirinaki Te Pua-a-Tāne Conservation Park and Te Paki). It has also been recorded from surveys at Waimamaku and Hokianga.
