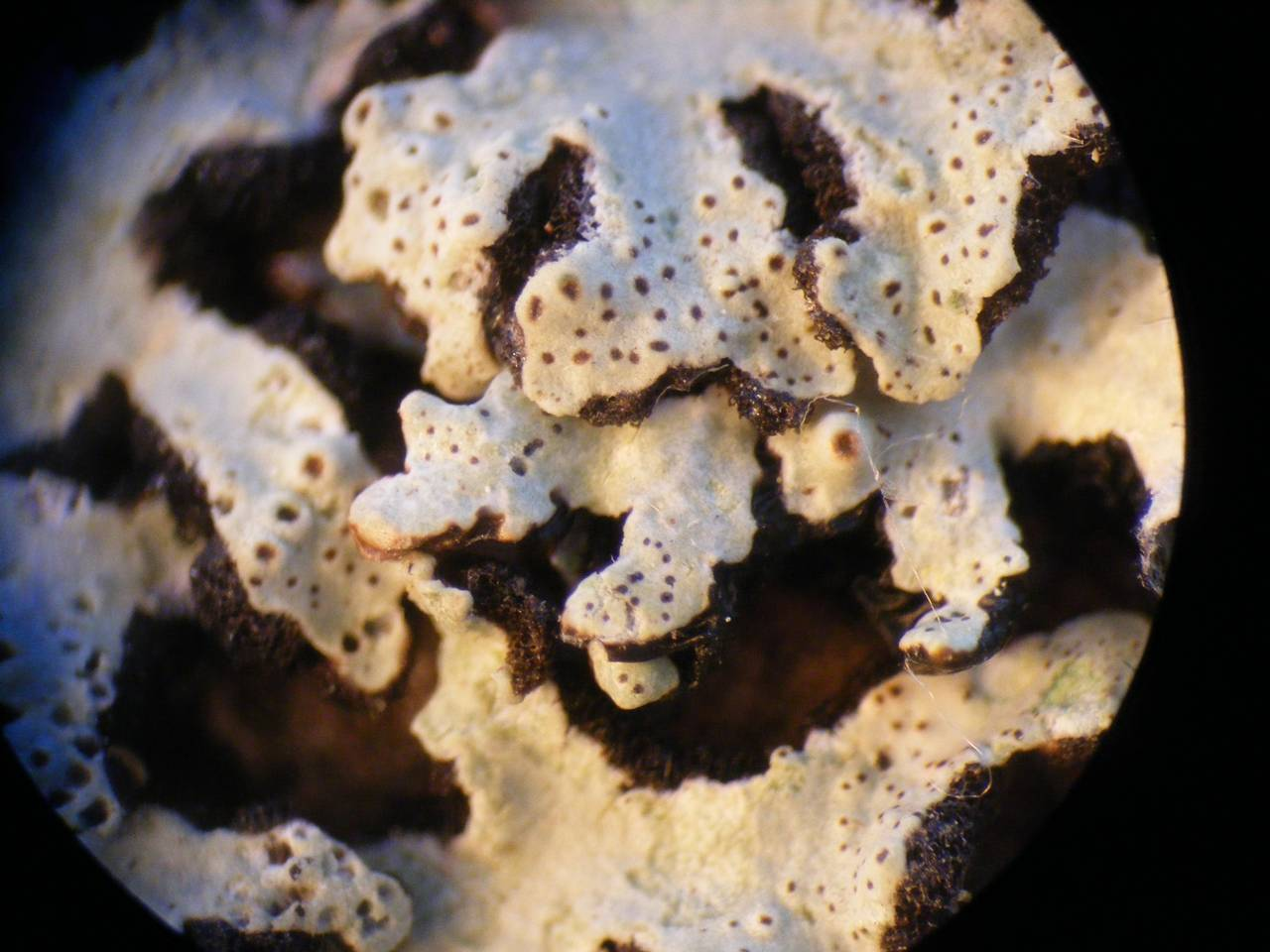

Scientific classification
- Domain: Eukaryota
- Kingdom: Fungi
- Division: Ascomycota
- Class: Lecanoromycetes
- Order: Lecanorales
- Family: Parmeliaceae
- Genus: Pannoparmelia
- Species: P. angustata

Binomial name
- Pannoparmelia angustata (Pers.) Zahlbr. (1930)

Synonyms
- Parmelia angustata Pers. (1827); Anzia angustata (Pers.) Müll.Arg. (1889); Pannaria angustata (Pers.) Zahlbr. (1932); Parmelia inaequalis Taylor (1847); Parmelia moniliformis C.Bab. (1855); Parmelia angustata var. moniliformis (C.Bab.) Stirt. (1900)

= Pannoparmelia angustata =

Species of lichen

Pannoparmelia angustata is a species of foliose lichen in the family Parmeliaceae. It occurs in Australia, New Zealand, and South America.

== Taxonomy ==
The lichen was first formally described by Christiaan Hendrik Persoon in 1827, who classified it in the genus Parmelia. Alexander Zahlbruckner transferred it to the genus Pannoparmelia in 1930.

== Description ==
Pannoparmelia angustata is a species of foliose lichen that forms loose, roughly circular patches up to 10 centimeters across. Its narrow lobes are 0.5–2 millimetres wide, linear or sometimes appearing beaded (moniliform), and branch moderately to densely, primarily in pairs near the thallus edge. The upper surface appears bright yellowish-green to pale greyish-yellow and is smooth, lacking vegetative reproductive structures like isidia or soredia.

The lower surface is white, with a spongy underlayer (hypothallus) ranging from pale yellow-brown to black. Simple root-like structures (rhizines) occur occasionally to frequently along lobe margins. When present, the spore-producing structures (apothecia) are stalked, up to 1 centimetre wide, with discs varying from pale yellowish-brown to dark red-brown. The spores are egg-shaped, measuring 6–6.5 by 5–6 micrometres (μm). Small, shiny spore-producing structures (pycnidia) commonly appear at lobe tips, producing rod-shaped to slightly spindle-shaped reproductive cells (conidia) 5–6.5 μm long.

Chemical spot tests (K, C, KC, P) produce no colour changes in either the outer layer or inner tissue. The lichen contains usnic and divaricatic acids.

== Habitat and distribution ==
Pannoparmelia angustata is found in southeastern Australia (New South Wales, Australian Capital Territory, Victoria, and Tasmania) as well as New Zealand and southern South America (Argentina and Chile). The species primarily grows on tree bark, with occasional occurrences on mosses. In Chile's Magallanes region, P. angustata characteristically inhabits exposed, smooth bark, particularly on Nothofagus betuloides trees growing at the edges of bogs.
