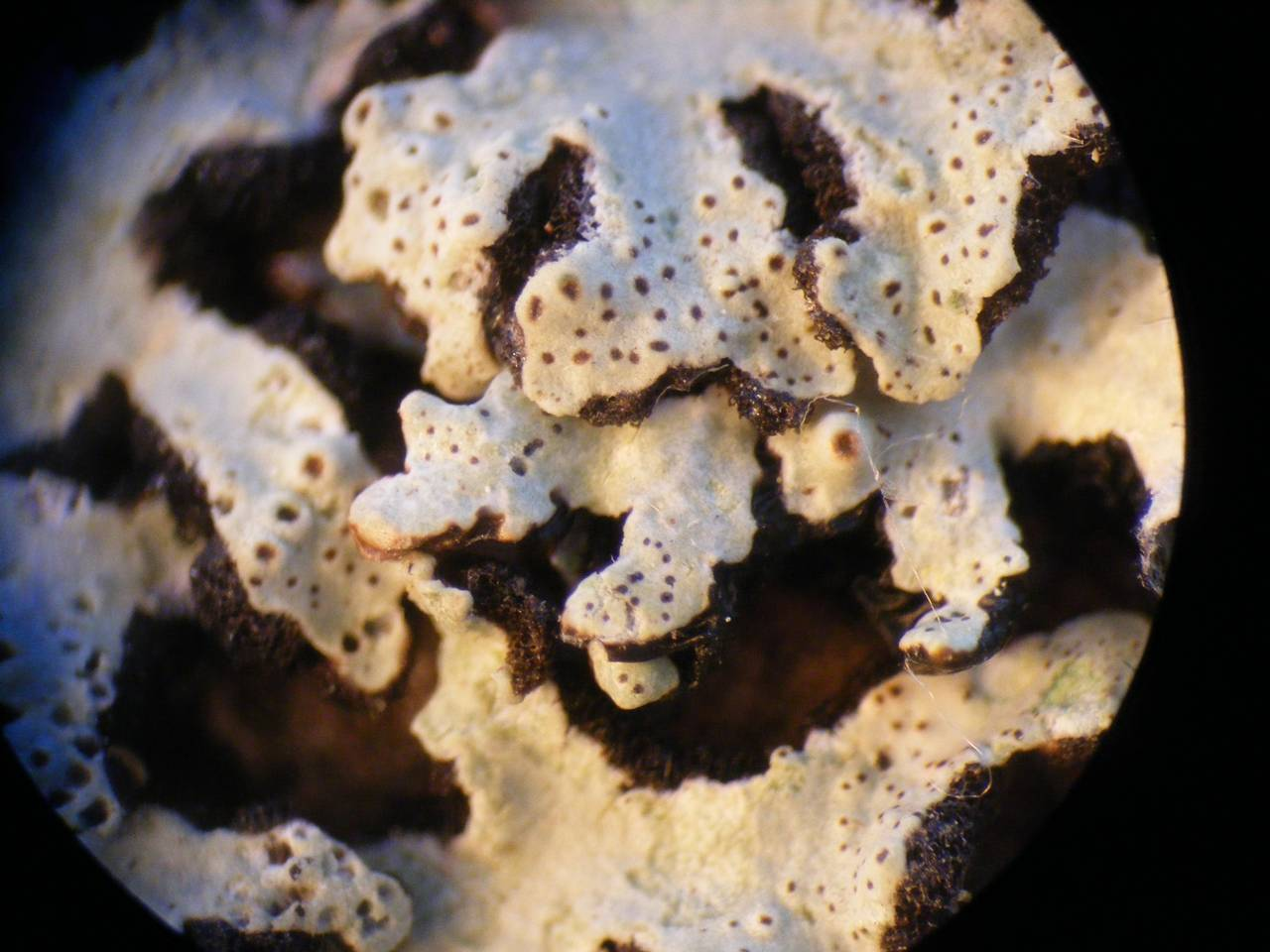
- Pannoparmelia angustata

Scientific classification
- Kingdom: Fungi
- Division: Ascomycota
- Class: Lecanoromycetes
- Order: Lecanorales
- Family: Parmeliaceae
- Genus: Pannoparmelia (Müll.Arg.) Darb. (1912)

Synonyms
- Anzia sect. Pannoparmelia Müll.Arg. (1889)

= Pannoparmelia =

Genus of fungi

Pannoparmelia is a genus of lichenised ascomycetes in the large family Parmeliaceae. It is a genus of five currently accepted species of foliose lichens.

== Etymology ==
The name Pannoparmelia comes from the Latin term pannosus, which means 'felt-like texture'. This is a reference to the noticeably spongy thallus exhibited by species in this genus.
