= Pico do Castelo =

Mountain in Porto Santo, Madeira, Portugal

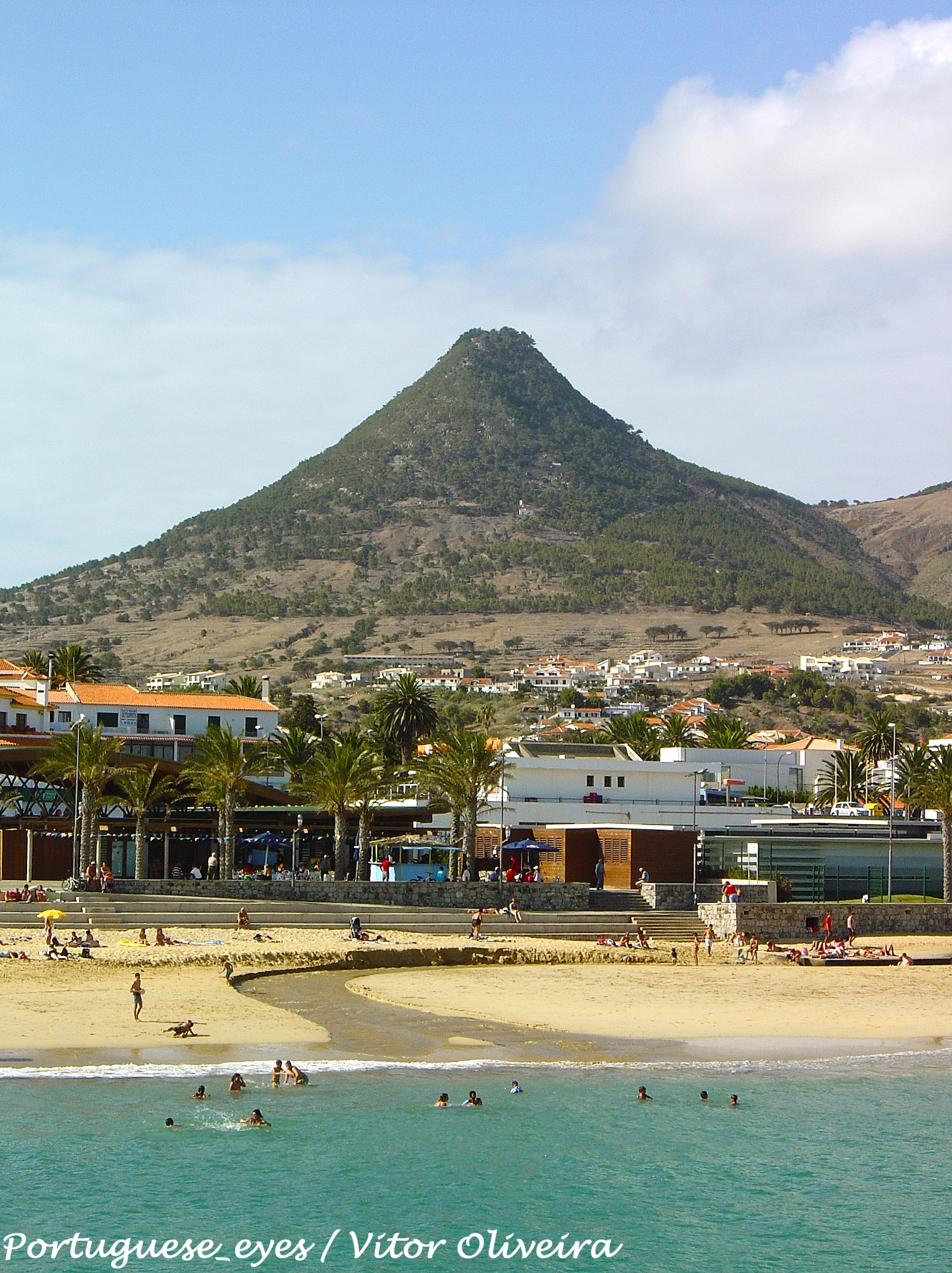
- View of Pico do Castelo from Vila Baleira

Highest point
- Elevation: 437 m (1,434 ft)
- Coordinates: 33°04′50.7″N 16°20′02.3″W

Geography
- Location within Madeira
- Location: Porto Santo Island, Madeira, Portugal

Pico do Castelo (Castle Peak) is a 437 m (1,434 ft) high volcano-shaped peak on Porto Santo Island. The peak is covered with conifers and has a panoramic terrace and a picnic spot. On the top, there is a bust in homage to Schiappa de Azevedo, who contributed strongly to the afforestation of the hill, which was once more deserted, and there are also ruins of a 16th century fortress, symbol of the defense of the population against the continued pirate attacks on the island, during troubled centuries.
