= Ernst Stizenberger =

German physician and lichenologist

Ernst Stizenberger (14 June 1827, in Konstanz – 27 September 1895) was a German physician and lichenologist.

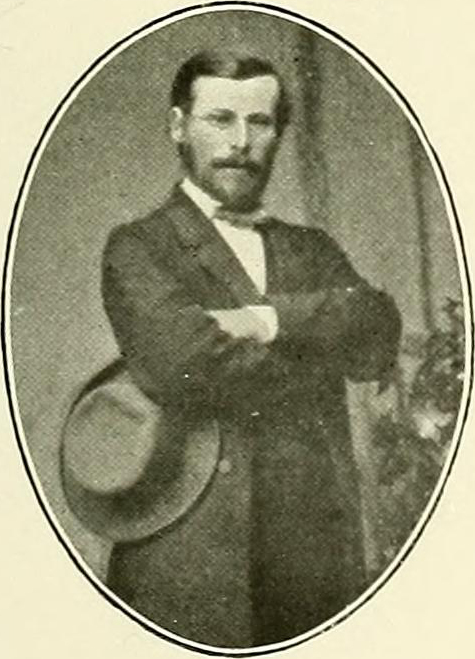
Ernst Stizenberger

He studied medicine at the University of Freiburg, afterwards furthering his medical training in Prague and Vienna. In 1851 he returned to Konstanz, where he worked as a general practitioner until his death in 1895. Throughout his career he had a passion for botany, especially lichenology.

His principal works include a book on lichens native to Africa, Lichenaea Africana (1890–91), and studies of a lichenized genus of fungi known as Sticta. With Alexander Braun (1805–1877) and Gottlob Ludwig Rabenhorst (1806–1881), he was editor of the exsiccata series Die Characeen Europa's in getrockneten Exemplaren, unter Mitwirkung mehrerer Freunde der Botanik, gesammelt und herausgegeben von Prof. A. Braun, L. Rabenhorst und E. Stizenberger and Kryptogamen Badens, unter Mitwirkung mehrerer Botaniker, gesammelt und herausgegeben von Jos. Bernh. Jack, Ludwig Leiner und Dr. Ernst Stizenberger. Stizenberger is the taxonomic author of the genus Anzia.

== Selected writings ==
- Dr. Ludwig Rabenhorst's Algen Sachsens, resp. Mitteleuropa's, decade I-C : systematisch geordnet, mit Zugrundelegung eines neuen Systems, 1860 - On Ludwig Rabenhorst's algae of Saxony, .
- Beitrag zur Flechtensystematik, 1862 - Contributions to lichen systematics.
- Ueber den gegenwärtigen Stand der Flechtenkunde, 1862 - On the present state of lichen knowledge.
- Kritische Bemerkungen über die Lecideaceen mit nadelförmigen Sporen, 1863 - Critical remarks on Lecideaceae with needle-shaped spores.
- Ueber die steinbewohnenden Opegrapha-Arten, 1865 - On stone inhabiting Opegrapha-types.
- Lecidea sabuletorum Flörke und die ihr verwandten Flechten-Arten : eine Monographie, 1867 - Lecidea sabuletorum (Flörke) and its related lichen species: A monograph.
- Verzeichniß der von Th. v. Heuglin auf Nowaja Semlja gesammelten Lichenen in: Petermann's geogr. communications, Issue 11, 1872 - Catalog of Theodor von Heuglin on lichens collected in Novaya Zemlya.
- Botanische Plaudereien über ber die Flechten (Lichenes), 1873 - Botanical discussion on lichens.
- Index lichenum hyperboreorum, 1876
- Lichenes Helvetici: eorumque stationes et distributio, 1882–83
- Nachtrag zur botanischen Ausbeute der Novara-Expedition in: Flora. LXIX 1886 No. 26 p. 415. - Addendum to the botanical yield of the Novara Expedition.
- Lichenaea Africana, 1890–91 - Lichens of Africa.
- Die Grübchenflechten (Stictei) und ihre geographische Verbreitung, 1895
- "List of lichens collected by Mr. Robert Reuleaux in the western parts of North America", (English translation, 1895).

== See also ==
- Category:Taxa named by Ernst Stizenberger
