= Porto Santo Island =

Atlantic island near Madeira, Portugal

Native name: Ilha do Porto Santo Nickname: The Golden Island
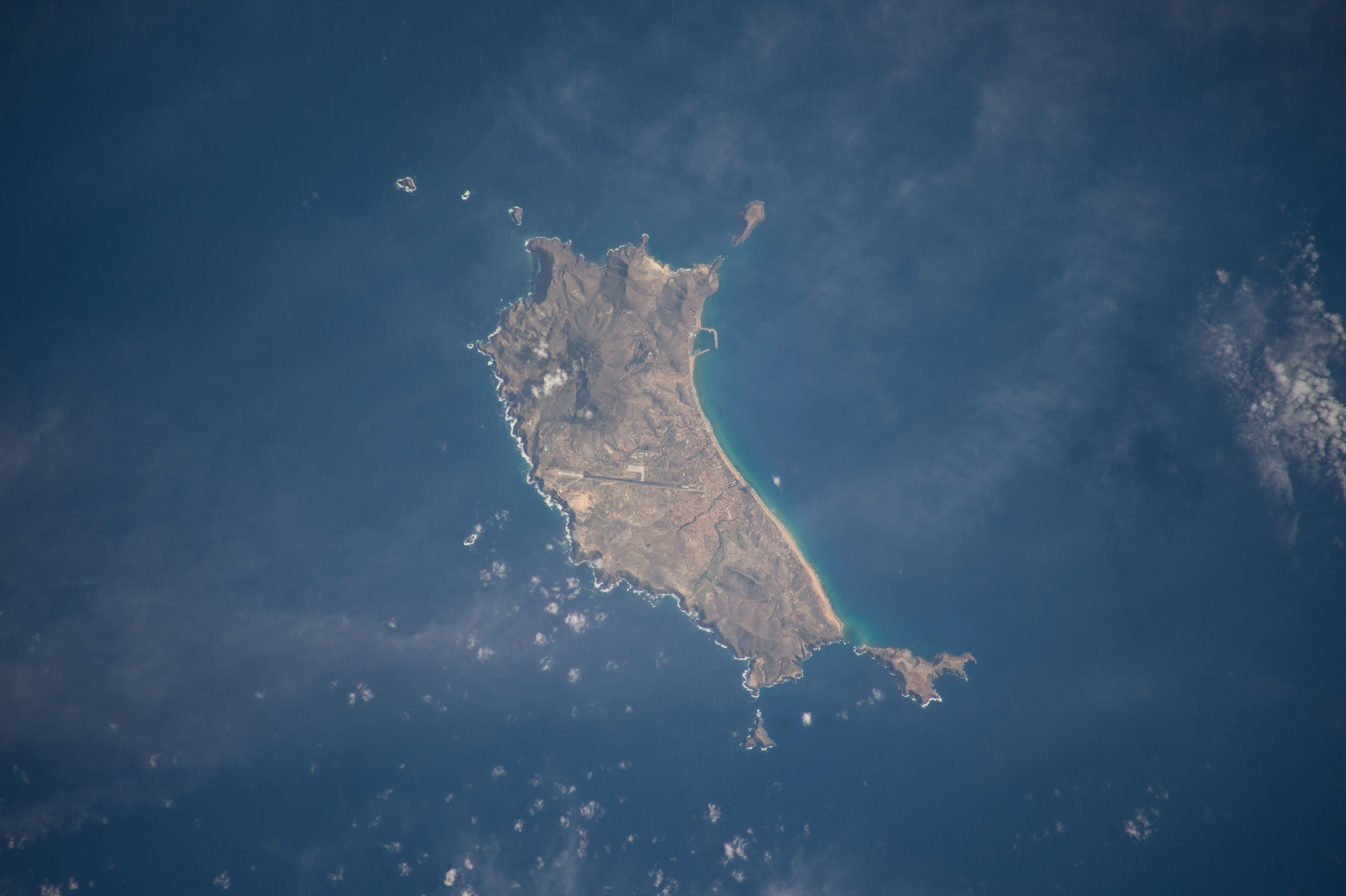
- Interactive map of Porto Santo

Geography
- Location: Atlantic Ocean
- Coordinates: 33°03′43.0″N 16°21′23.0″W
- Archipelago: Madeira
- Area: 42.17 km^{2} (16.28 sq mi)
- Highest elevation: 517 m (1696 ft)
- Highest point: Pico do Facho

Administration
- Portugal
- Autonomous Region: Madeira
- Municipality: Porto Santo
- Freguesia: Porto Santo
- Largest settlement: Vila Baleira

Demographics
- Demonym: Portossantense
- Population: ▼5,158 (2021)
- Languages: Portuguese
- Ethnic groups: Portuguese

Additional information
- Time zone: WET (UTC±00:00)

Porto Santo Island (Portuguese pronunciation: [ˈpoɾtu ˈsɐ̃tu]; Portuguese: Ilha do Porto Santo) is a Portuguese island and municipality 43 kilometres (23 nautical miles) northeast of Madeira Island in the North Atlantic Ocean; it is the northernmost and easternmost island of the archipelago of Madeira, located in the Atlantic Ocean west of Europe and Africa. The municipality of Porto Santo occupies the entire island and small neighbouring islands. It was elevated to city status on 6 August 1996. The sole parish of the municipality is also named Porto Santo. The population in 2011 was 5,483, in an area of 42.59 km^{2}. The main settlement on the island is Vila Baleira.

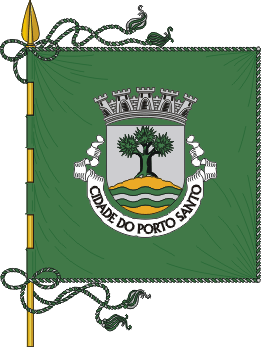
Flag of the Municipality

== History ==
It appears that some knowledge of Atlantic islands, such as Madeira, existed before the discovery and settlement of these lands, as the islands appear on maps as early as 1339. From a portolan dating to 1351, and preserved in Florence, Italy, it would appear that the islands of Madeira had been discovered long before being claimed by the Portuguese expedition of 1418. In Libro del Conocimiento (1348–1349), a Castilian monk also identified the location of the islands in their present location, with the names Leiname (modern Italian legname with the same meaning as Portuguese madeira, "wood"), Diserta and Puerto Santo. Indeed, the move by Portugal to claim the Madeiran islands was probably a response to Spain's efforts at the time to claim and subdue the Canary Islands.

However, humans never recorded the discovery of Porto Santo Island or the other Madeira islands until 1418 when captains were storm blown into its sheltered harbor. They were in the service of Infante Henrique of Portugal. João Gonçalves Zarco and Tristão Vaz Teixeira had been ordered by King John I to discover new territory west of Africa and had been sent off-course by a storm while making the volta do mar westward swing return voyage. The island's name Porto Santo (en: "Holy Harbour") was derived from the sailors' stories of their discovery of a sheltered bay during the tempest, which was interpreted as divine deliverance. The first Portuguese settlers arrived in the 1420s.

Bartolomeu Perestrelo, a member of the team that later explored the Madeira Islands, became the first Captain-donatário of Porto Santo, by royal award in November 1445. It was he who released a female rabbit that had littered on the voyage, with her offspring, which multiplied catastrophically in a xeric island ecosystem that had evolved in isolation and had never known a flightless mammal. The loss of the native flora laid the island slopes open to erosion and colonization by European weeds that accompanied the settlers.

During the first centuries of settlement, life on Porto Santo was harsh, owing to the scarcity of potable water and the depredations of feral rabbits; there were also constant attacks by Barbary Coast pirates and French privateers. In 1617 Barbary Pirates took 663 of the island's inhabitants as slaves following their Sack of Madeira.

The New World explorer Christopher Columbus married the Portuguese noblewoman Filipa Moniz Perestrelo, the daughter of Bartolomeu Perestrelo. For a while they lived on Porto Santo. The home is now a museum.

== Geography ==
=== Physical geography ===
The island is characterized by two areas: the accidented northeast (mountainous, with rocky ledges and cliffs), and a coastal plain in the southwest (that includes a nine-kilometer long white sand beach, giving the island an advantage over neighboring Madeira). The mountainous northeast part of the island consists of two geomorphological structures that includes: an area of peaks, Pico do Castelo (437 meters), Pico da Juliana (447 meters), Pico da Gandaia (499 meters) and Pico do Facho (517 meters); and, between the eastern coast and this area, a series of minor peaks, Pico do Maçarico (285 meters), Pico do Concelho (324 meters) and Pico Branco (450 meters).

The southwest part of the island, although relatively flat, includes a series of elevations 100 meters in height or greater, such as Pico Ana Fereira (283 meters), Pico do Espigão (270 meters) and the Cabeço do Zimbralinho (183 meters). The slope of the western part of the island slopes from 150 meters to the south coast reaching the sandy beaches of Porto Santo. A third system, in the west-northwest, that includes Cabeço da Bárbara Gomes (227 meters) and Cabeço das Canelinhas (176 meters) is distinct from the areas identified. The island is encircled by an oceanic platform between 20 and 37 km^{2}, with a minimum depth of 8 meters (Baixa do Noroeste), and limited by the flanks of a large submarine volcano.

The rock-dwelling fruticose Mountain Strap lichen Ramalina confertula is found only in a few spots on the volcanoes of Porto Santo.

The island's submarine activity occurred during the Miocene epoch, producing basaltic eruptions that persisted to the Quaternary period. There were three phases of distinct volcanism, followed by periods of calm associated with sedimentation:

1st Phase - associated with basaltic lava, pyroclastic flows, trachyte domes that were to form Pico do Concelho, Pico do Facho, Pico do Juliana and the Ponta da Calheta. This period was followed by a period of marine fossil accumulation, concentrated in the northeast of the island to about 300 meters altitude (around Pico do Juliana, Pico de Ana Ferreira and Ribeira do Moledo);

2nd Phase - this was a period of fissural volcanism that cut across and metamorphosed the older formations, occurring in the early Pliocene period;

3rd Phase - was an intrusive phase, resulting in a number of faults and dikes that cut across the Calcareous fossils. Likely occurring in the Pliocene, it was followed by deposits of layers of detritic and calcareous sediments, that included brownish-red alluvial layers, along the island's flanks and beach.

=== Climate ===
Porto Santo has a semi-arid climate (BSh), with mild to warm winters and warm to hot summers. The driest months are July and August, and the wettest are November and December.

Unlike mountainous Madeira, which effectively traps rain clouds and the moisture of oceanic currents due to its high orography, the comparatively low profile of Porto Santo results in a dry climate. Despite this lack of precipitation, humidity remains high, averaging 77% year-round. The sunniest months are August and September.

Climate data for Porto Santo (Airport), normals: 1991–2020, extremes: 1971-2020, altitude: 78 m (256 ft)
Month	Jan	Feb	Mar	Apr	May	Jun	Jul	Aug	Sep	Oct	Nov	Dec	Year
Record high °C (°F)	23.2 (73.8)	22.7 (72.9)	26.0 (78.8)	27.2 (81.0)	28.3 (82.9)	30.5 (86.9)	35.0 (95.0)	35.3 (95.5)	34.4 (93.9)	31.6 (88.9)	29.2 (84.6)	24.0 (75.2)	35.3 (95.5)
Mean daily maximum °C (°F)	18.4 (65.1)	18.2 (64.8)	18.9 (66.0)	19.8 (67.6)	21.2 (70.2)	23.0 (73.4)	24.6 (76.3)	25.7 (78.3)	25.4 (77.7)	23.8 (74.8)	21.2 (70.2)	19.4 (66.9)	21.6 (70.9)
Daily mean °C (°F)	16.0 (60.8)	15.8 (60.4)	16.3 (61.3)	17.1 (62.8)	18.5 (65.3)	20.4 (68.7)	22.0 (71.6)	23.1 (73.6)	22.7 (72.9)	21.2 (70.2)	18.8 (65.8)	17.1 (62.8)	19.1 (66.4)
Mean daily minimum °C (°F)	13.7 (56.7)	13.3 (55.9)	13.7 (56.7)	14.3 (57.7)	15.8 (60.4)	17.8 (64.0)	19.4 (66.9)	20.5 (68.9)	20.0 (68.0)	18.5 (65.3)	16.4 (61.5)	14.9 (58.8)	16.5 (61.7)
Record low °C (°F)	7.6 (45.7)	6.4 (43.5)	7.0 (44.6)	8.8 (47.8)	10.6 (51.1)	12.3 (54.1)	14.0 (57.2)	16.2 (61.2)	14.6 (58.3)	12.4 (54.3)	9.4 (48.9)	7.5 (45.5)	6.4 (43.5)
Average precipitation mm (inches)	44.9 (1.77)	45.2 (1.78)	33.4 (1.31)	30.0 (1.18)	18.1 (0.71)	10.2 (0.40)	4.1 (0.16)	4.4 (0.17)	17.0 (0.67)	48.4 (1.91)	63.5 (2.50)	62.5 (2.46)	381.7 (15.02)
Average precipitation days (≥ 1 mm)	7.4	6.4	6.0	5.2	3.5	2.2	1.5	1.4	3.6	6.9	8.4	9.0	61.5
Average relative humidity (%)	79	80	78	75	75	76	76	76	77	78	79	79	77
Mean monthly sunshine hours	137.7	148.8	201.6	219.5	244.4	240.8	253.6	254.9	223.3	198.9	138.0	135.2	2,396.7
Percentage possible sunshine	43	48	54	56	57	56	58	62	60	57	44	44	53
Source 1: Instituto Português do Mar e da Atmosfera
Source 2: German Meteorological Service (sunshine 2000-2020)

Climate data for Porto Santo Airport (1971–2000), altitude: 78 m (256 ft)
Month	Jan	Feb	Mar	Apr	May	Jun	Jul	Aug	Sep	Oct	Nov	Dec	Year
Record high °C (°F)	23.2 (73.8)	22.6 (72.7)	26.0 (78.8)	26.4 (79.5)	27.6 (81.7)	30.5 (86.9)	31.6 (88.9)	35.3 (95.5)	34.4 (93.9)	28.6 (83.5)	29.2 (84.6)	23.3 (73.9)	35.3 (95.5)
Mean daily maximum °C (°F)	18.0 (64.4)	18.0 (64.4)	18.5 (65.3)	19.2 (66.6)	20.5 (68.9)	22.1 (71.8)	23.5 (74.3)	25.0 (77.0)	25.0 (77.0)	23.2 (73.8)	21.0 (69.8)	19.2 (66.6)	21.1 (70.0)
Daily mean °C (°F)	15.6 (60.1)	15.5 (59.9)	15.9 (60.6)	16.5 (61.7)	17.8 (64.0)	19.6 (67.3)	21.3 (70.3)	22.5 (72.5)	22.3 (72.1)	20.6 (69.1)	18.6 (65.5)	16.8 (62.2)	18.6 (65.5)
Mean daily minimum °C (°F)	13.2 (55.8)	13.1 (55.6)	13.3 (55.9)	13.8 (56.8)	15.1 (59.2)	17.1 (62.8)	18.8 (65.8)	19.9 (67.8)	19.6 (67.3)	18.1 (64.6)	16.2 (61.2)	14.4 (57.9)	16.1 (61.0)
Record low °C (°F)	7.6 (45.7)	6.4 (43.5)	8.4 (47.1)	8.8 (47.8)	10.6 (51.1)	12.3 (54.1)	14.0 (57.2)	16.2 (61.2)	14.6 (58.3)	12.4 (54.3)	10.1 (50.2)	7.5 (45.5)	6.4 (43.5)
Average precipitation mm (inches)	48.7 (1.92)	40.2 (1.58)	37.2 (1.46)	23.5 (0.93)	14.0 (0.55)	7.0 (0.28)	3.2 (0.13)	4.0 (0.16)	23.7 (0.93)	39.9 (1.57)	50.0 (1.97)	69.9 (2.75)	361.3 (14.22)
Average precipitation days (≥ 0.1 mm)	13.7	12.2	10.9	10.4	8.5	6.7	4.8	4.6	7.4	12.0	12.5	15.1	118.8
Average relative humidity (%) (at 9:00 UTC)	79	80	78	75	75	76	76	76	77	78	79	79	77
Mean monthly sunshine hours	137.7	148.8	201.6	219.5	244.4	240.8	253.6	254.9	223.3	198.9	138.0	135.2	2,396.7
Percentage possible sunshine	43	48	54	56	57	56	58	62	60	57	44	44	53
Source 1: Instituto Português do Mar e da Atmosfera
Source 2: German Meteorological Service (sunshine 2000-2020)

=== Human geography ===
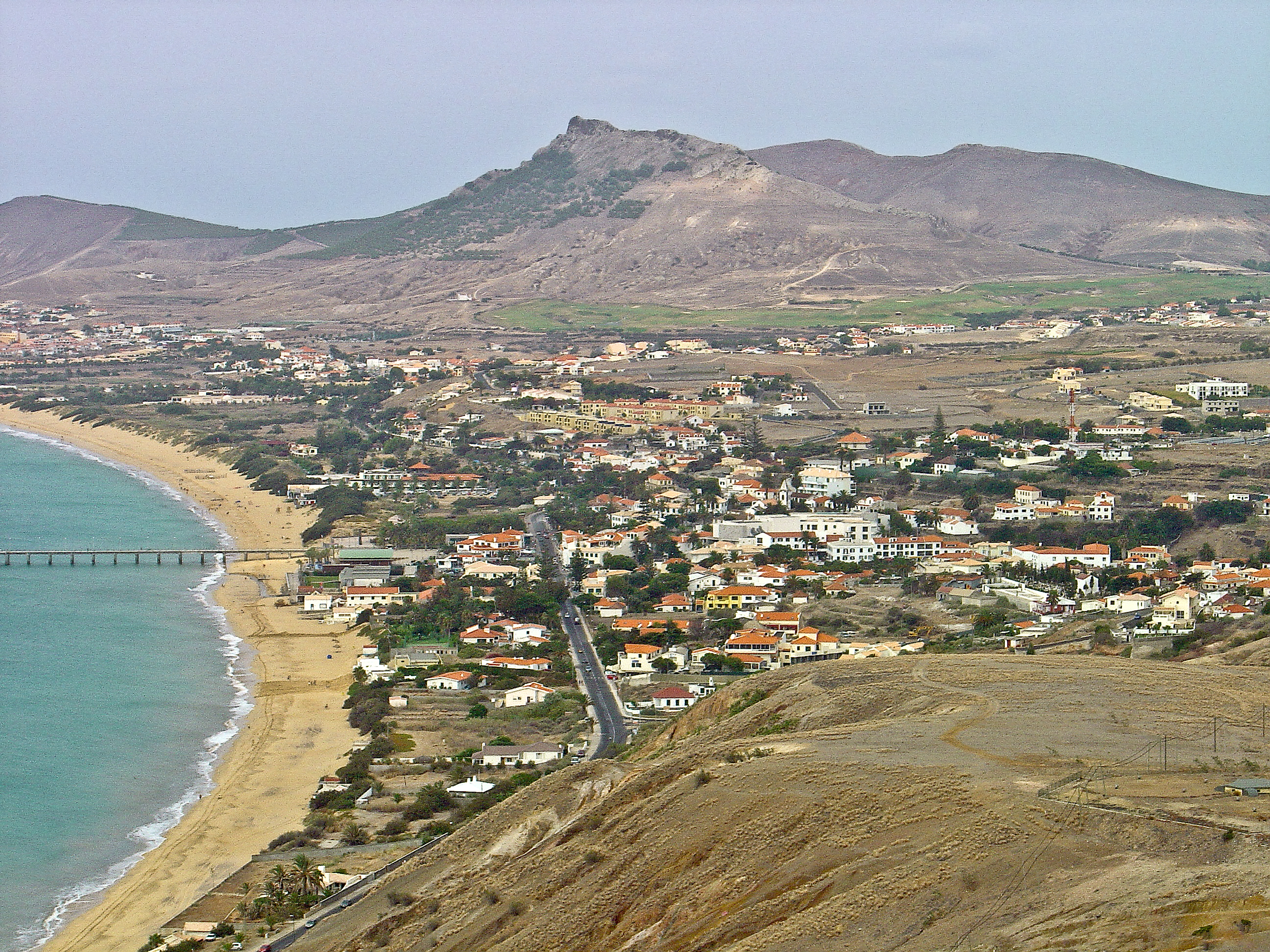
Vila Baleira as seen from the flanks of Pico do Castelo

The main urban area is the city of Vila Baleira ([ˈvilɐ bɐˈlɐiɾɐ]), also known as Porto Santo.

Although a small island, the Porto Santo community has its own schools, health-care centre, police detachments, a gymnasium, churches, several local squares, a Congress Centre, museum, shopping centres, bars, hotels and restaurants.

== Economy ==
The main industry on the island of Porto Santo is tourism, which has emerged through hotel construction in the 20th century and is based on the attractions of the beaches and temperate climate.

The island has a golf course that was designed by Spanish golfing champion Seve Ballesteros; Porto Santo Golfe hosted the Madeira Islands Open in 2009, as part of the European Tour. Once the planned second course is completed, Porto Santo Golfe will be the largest course in Madeira: there is currently one 18-hole golf course and one nine-hole course. In addition, Porto Santo's Golf Complex includes eight tennis courts and an equestrian centre (Pico Ana Ferreira).

The island has an international airport, with daily flights to Madeira Airport (about a 15-minute flight away). The Porto Santo Airport (PXO) has connections with both domestic (Lisbon, Porto) and (occasionally) international flights (including several charters to Italy, Germany, Scandinavia, Belgium, Luxembourg, France and Spain). The airport regularly serves as a diversion location for aircraft unable to land at Madeira Airport, due to the latter's frequent closures as a result of high winds coupled with its strict meteorological requirements for landing.

== Notable people ==
- Bartolomeu Perestrello (c. 1395–1457) – Portuguese navigator and explorer who is claimed to have discovered and populated Porto Santo Island from 1419.
- Filipa Moniz Perestrelo (c. 1455 – between 1479-84) – a Portuguese noblewoman who was the wife of Christopher Columbus.
- Stephen Peter Alencastre (1876–1940) – Roman Catholic bishop, fifth and last Vicar Apostolic of the Hawaiian Islands.

== Sources ==
- Rocha, António; Silva, João; Soares, Helena; Abenta, Jaime; Almeida, Fernando; Gomes, Celso (2002). Geologia, génese e dinâmica da areia de praia da ilha do Porto Santo: O sistema de informação geográfica [Geology, Genesis and Dynamics of the Beach Sand on the Island of Porto Santo: GIS] (in Portuguese). Oeiras, Portugal.
- Crosby, Alfred W. (1986). Ecological Imperialism: The Biological Expansion of Europe 900-1900.
