= Vila Baleira =

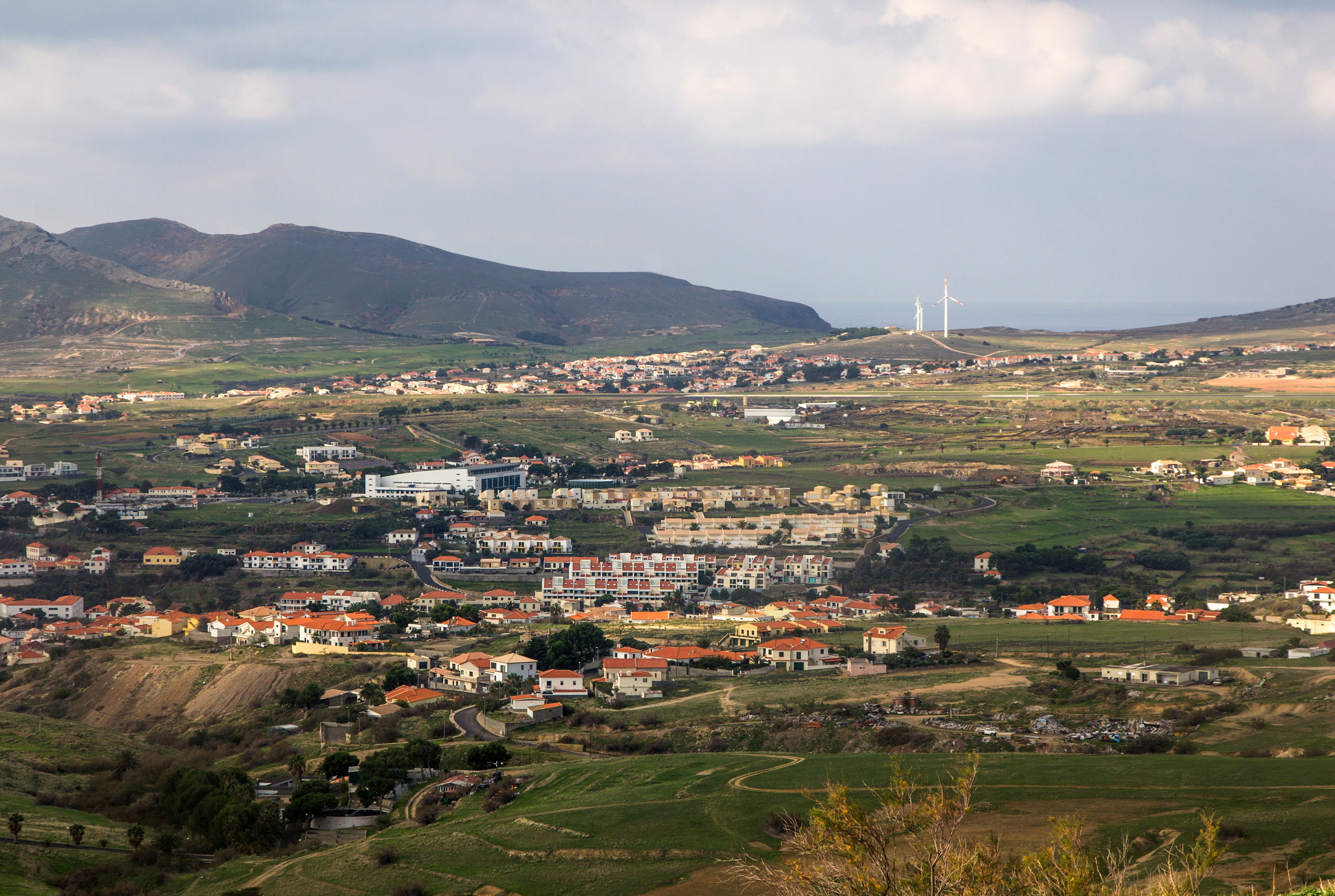
- Location of Vila Baleira

- Location within Madeira Location within Atlantic Ocean
- Coordinates: 33°04′00.0″N 16°20′00.0″W
- Country: Portugal
- Region: Madeira
- Municipality: Porto Santo

Area
  - Total: 40 km^{2} (15 sq mi)

Population (2011)
  - Total: 5,158

Vila Baleira is the main city in the municipality of Porto Santo, located on Porto Santo Island, Madeira, Portugal. It was made a city on 7 August 1996.
