= Battle of Funchal =

Attack by the Imperial German Navy submarine on 3 and 16 December 1916

- Part of Naval warfare of World War I
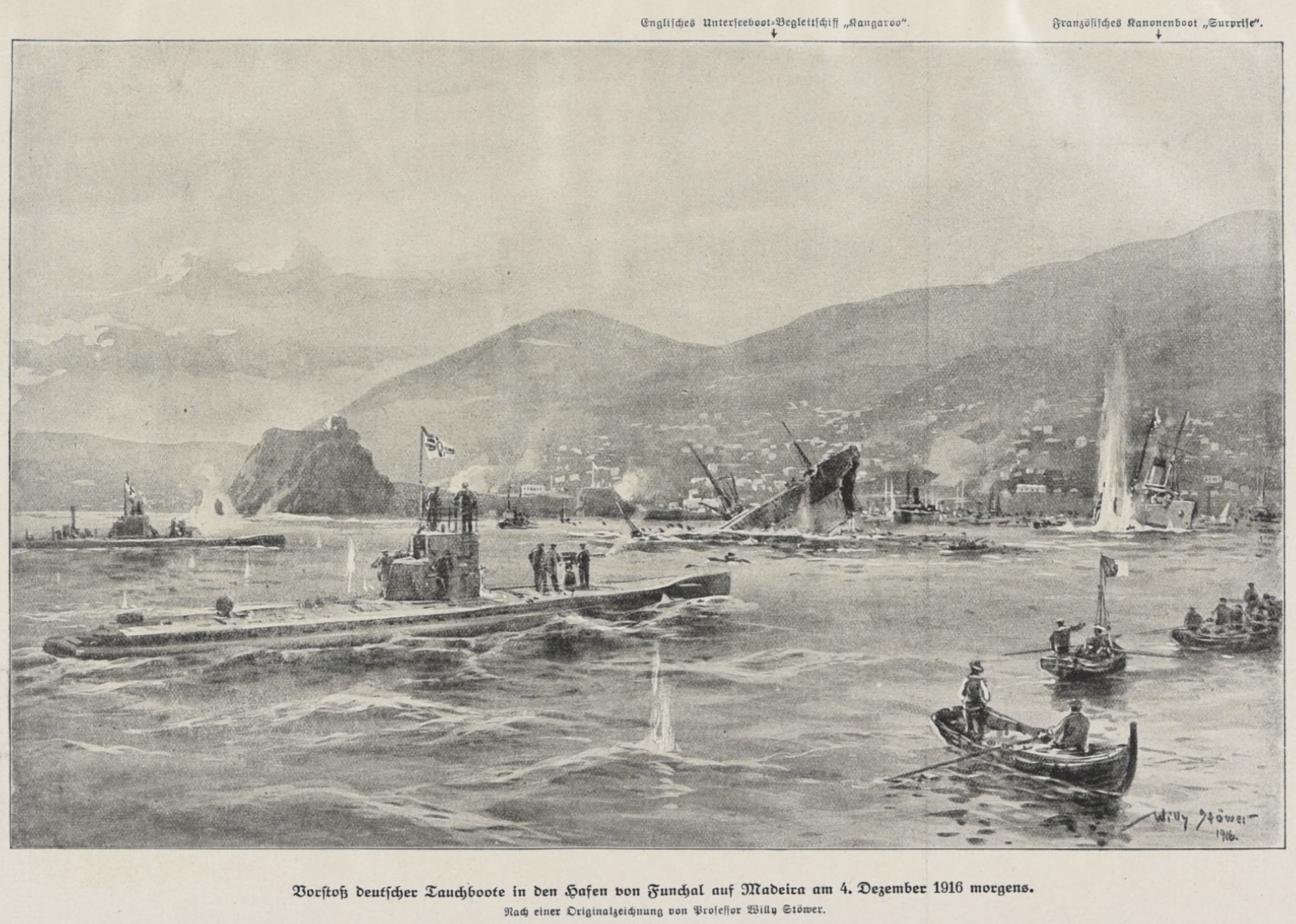
- German submarine U-38 attacking the port of Funchal on the morning of 3 December (illustration by Willy Stöwer from 1916; falsely picturing two U-boats instead of one)
Date	3 and 16 December 1916
Location	Port of Funchal, Funchal, Madeira 32°39′N 16°55′W
Result	German victory

Belligerents
Germany	Portugal

Commanders and leaders
Max Valentiner	Sales Henriques

Strength
U-38	

Casualties and losses
None	13 killed 38 injured

The Battle of Funchal on 3 and 16 December 1916 was a series of two attacks by the Imperial German Navy submarine U-38 on the port of Funchal, capital of Madeira during World War I. German sailors succeeded to sink three Allied and one Portuguese ships and also bombarded the city causing several casualties and serious material damage before the Portuguese coastal batteries were able to respond.

The second attack occurred on 16 December, when U-38 bombarded the city again, damaging the city telegraph station.

== Background ==
The Bay of Funchal has perfect conditions being used as a harbor for the ships crossing the Atlantic, after the start of the World War I then became strategically crucial. Natural conditions and the lack of infrastructure prevented the establishment of a naval base, despite the strategic value of the island in the context of the Atlantic routes.

The withdrawal the British Atlantic squadron from Madeira towards São Vicente on Cape Verde in June 1915 led to the greater presence of German submarines in that part of Atlantic. With the absence of anti-torpedo nets in the port of Funchal (no Portuguese port had this type of defensive feature), the maritime defense of Madeira was solely the responsibility of the commander of the port, frigate captain Sales Henriques. The permanent capacities of coastal navy defense were limited to three patrol boats, NRP Dory, NRP Dekade I and PNR Mariano de Carvalho; requisitioned yachts armed with a 47 mm cannon each, their crews were composed of both civilians and military. The land protection consisted two coastal batteries, one located at Forte de São Tiago and the other at Quinta da Vigia. Defense trenches were also built in Ribeira Brava and São Vicente.

On 9 March 1916 Portugal entered the war as a part of Allied forces and started to actively support Allied war efforts. As Portugal was quite distant from the frontlines, staff of the Imperial German Navy decided to attack Portuguese-controlled Madeira by a single submarine attack by torpedoes and also by a bombardment by the deck gun, already proved for example during the action of Lowca and Parton in August 1915, proceeded by U-28.

== First attack ==
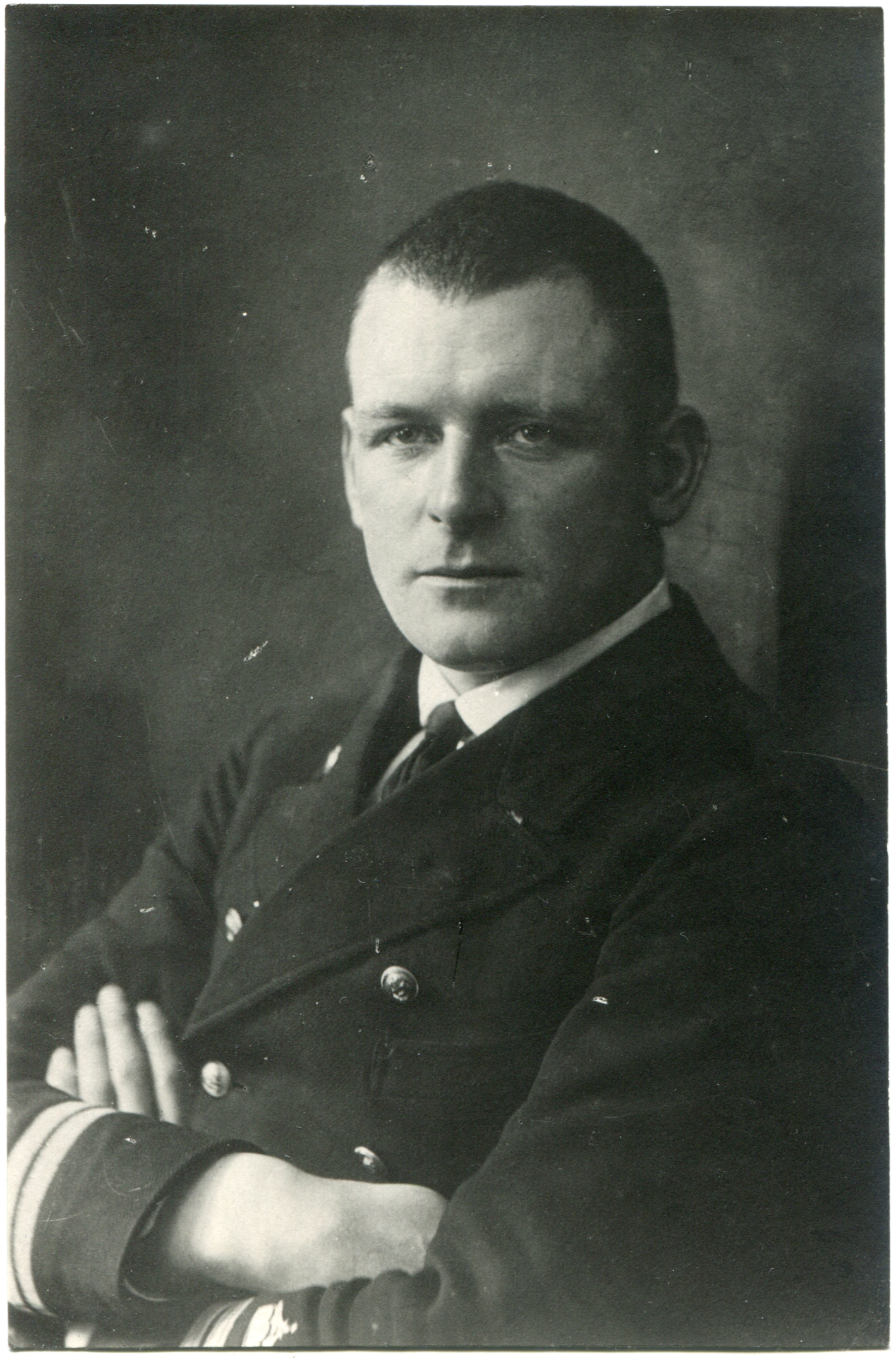
Max Valentiner (c. 1917)

On the morning of 3 December 1916 at 8:30 a.m. the submarine U-38, commanded by Max Valentiner, reached the bay of Funchal and began the attack. Valentiner fired torpedoes and hit the anchored English ship SS Surprise (680 tons), with a coal transport barge tied to her side, and French ships Kanguroo (2,493 tons), a military cargo ship, and CS Dacia (1,856 tons), a cable ship working in the area between Casablanca and Dakar. All four were sunk. Surprise was hit in the middle, at the level of the ammunition powder hold and the following explosion split the vessel in half. The ship sank in less than a minute, along with a gunboat tied to the ship. Eight men died, including the captain, and four were injured.

The other ships were anchored in the harbor just for a few hours. All the other crews left their ships on time and survived. The crew of Kanguroo, which had been anchored in Funchal Bay since 24 November for repairs, was able to fire 25 shots with a 65 mm bow gun before the ship being sunk. At this point, the coastal artillery batteries began to respond to the attack. The battery of Forte de São Tiago fired 18 and Quinta da Vigia 34 rounds of fire, but none of their projectiles hit the submarine which withdrew out of their range.

The American yacht Eleanor A. Percy was also present in the bay, but was not harmed.

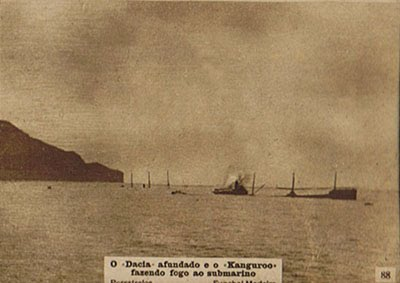
Wrecks of CS Dacia and SS Kanguroo in Funchal Bay

U-38 then began shelling the city from their deck 8.8 cm SK L/30 naval gun. The crew fired 50 shots from a distance of about three kilometres (1.9 mi) and lasted until about 11.00 a.m., targeting primarily the artillery batteries of Casino da Quinta da Vigia and Forte de São Tiago, the Estação do Cabo Submarino and the electricity generators facilities. Some projectiles hit civilian buildings, but caused no casualties. The bombardment caused panic in Funchal. Many families left their homes and went to the outskirts of Funchal; Monte, S. Roque, S. Martinho, Santo António or Caminho de Palheiro. Due to concerns of a repeated night attack, the shops in the city closed early and during the night the streets were patrolled by units of the 27th Infantry Regiment and the civic guard. By order of the commander of RI-27, all windows overlooking the sea were closed during the night and a curfew was imposed until 9:00 am.

== Second attack ==
Thirteen days later, on 16 December 1916, SM U-38 bombarded Funchal again. It did not cause any damage to the ships that were anchored in the bay, but it caused great panic among the Funchal citizens. The attack began at 6:00 a.m. and lasted approximately 20 to 30 minutes. The submarine bombarded a scattered area of the city with nearly 50 rounds of fire, killing 5 people and injuring 30. One of the projectiles fell in the Church of Santa Clara and wounded the priest. The city telegraph station was also damaged.

On that same day, the auxiliary cruiser NRP Gil Eanes arrived at the port of Funchal to escort the steamer Africa carrying passengers to Portuguese Angola and Mozambique.

== Aftermath ==
For this accomplishment, U-38 commander Max Valentiner became the sixth U-boat commander awarded the Pour le Mérite, on 26 December 1916. On 27 December, the auxiliary cruiser NRP Pedro Nunes set sail from the Tagus and arrived at Funchal on 31 December, with 2 officers, 6 sergeants, 28 sailors and 9 pieces of artillery on deck to reinforce the local garrison. This ship also transported the French survivors of the attack on Lisbon on 4 January 1917 for being transferred home.

On 12 December 1917, two German U-boats, U-156 and U-157 (captained by Valentiner) bombarded Funchal again. This time the attack lasted around 30 minutes. Forty, 4.7 inch and 5.9 inch shells were fired. There were 3 fatalities and 17 wounded, In addition, a number of houses and Santa Clara church were hit.

== Memory ==
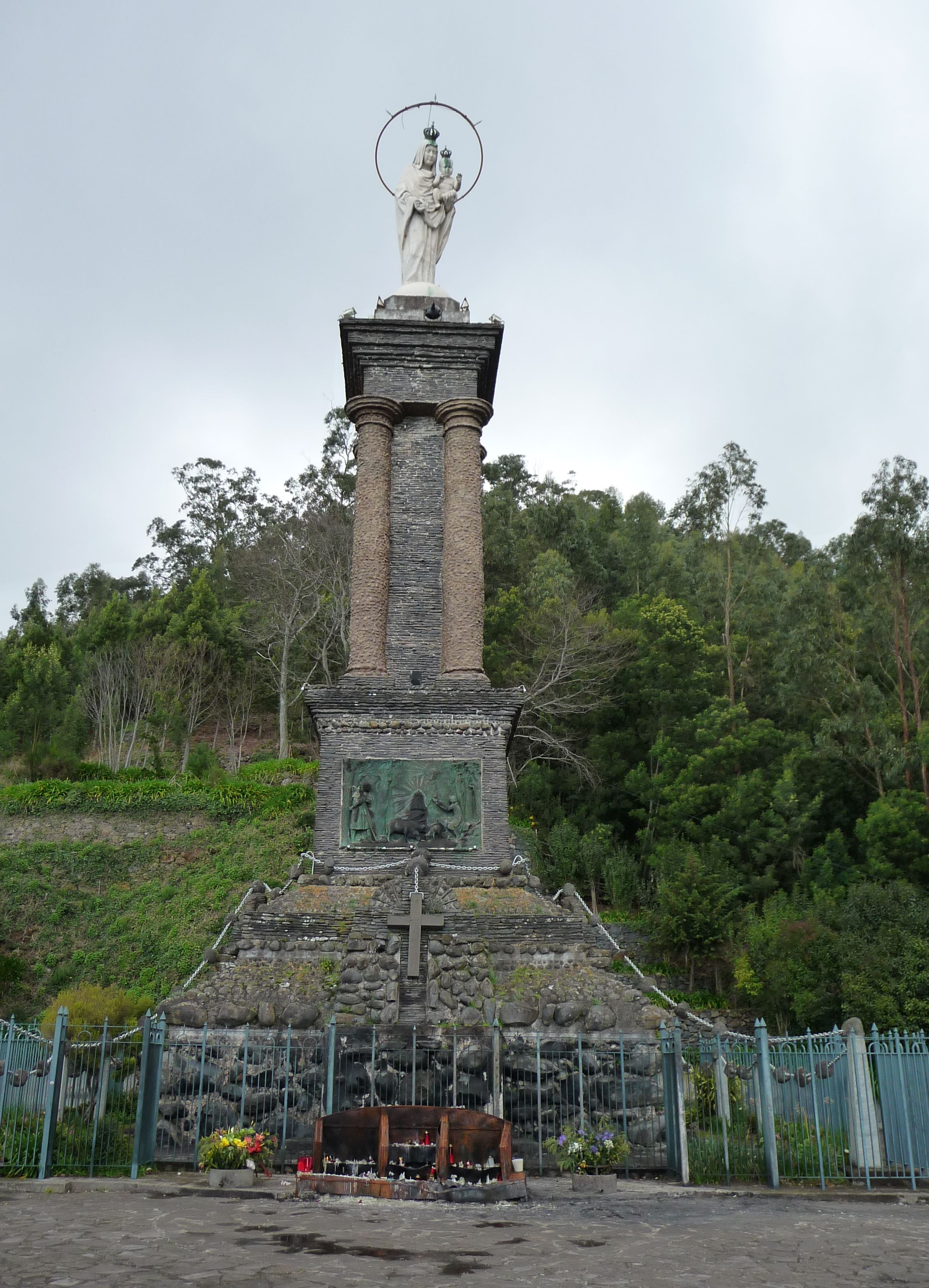
The Our Lady of Peace sanctuary in Terreiro da Luta

In 1927 The Our Lady of Peace sanctuary (Portuguese: Nossa Senhora da Paz) was erected in Terreiro da Luta as a memorial of the attack. The structure is composed of a statue with a religious relief and the rosary built of chains from the ships torpedoed on 3 December 1916 and stones from the Sant Antoni river.

Subsequently, in March 1921 the Portuguese medal Funchal Defesa Marítima was created to commemorate the action.

== See also ==
- History of Madeira
- Portugal in World War I

== Bibliography ==
- Illustrierte Geschichte des Weltkrieges 1914-1918. Sechster Band (in German). Stuttgart: Union Deutsche Verlagsgesellschaft. 1917. p. 57.
