= History of Madeira =

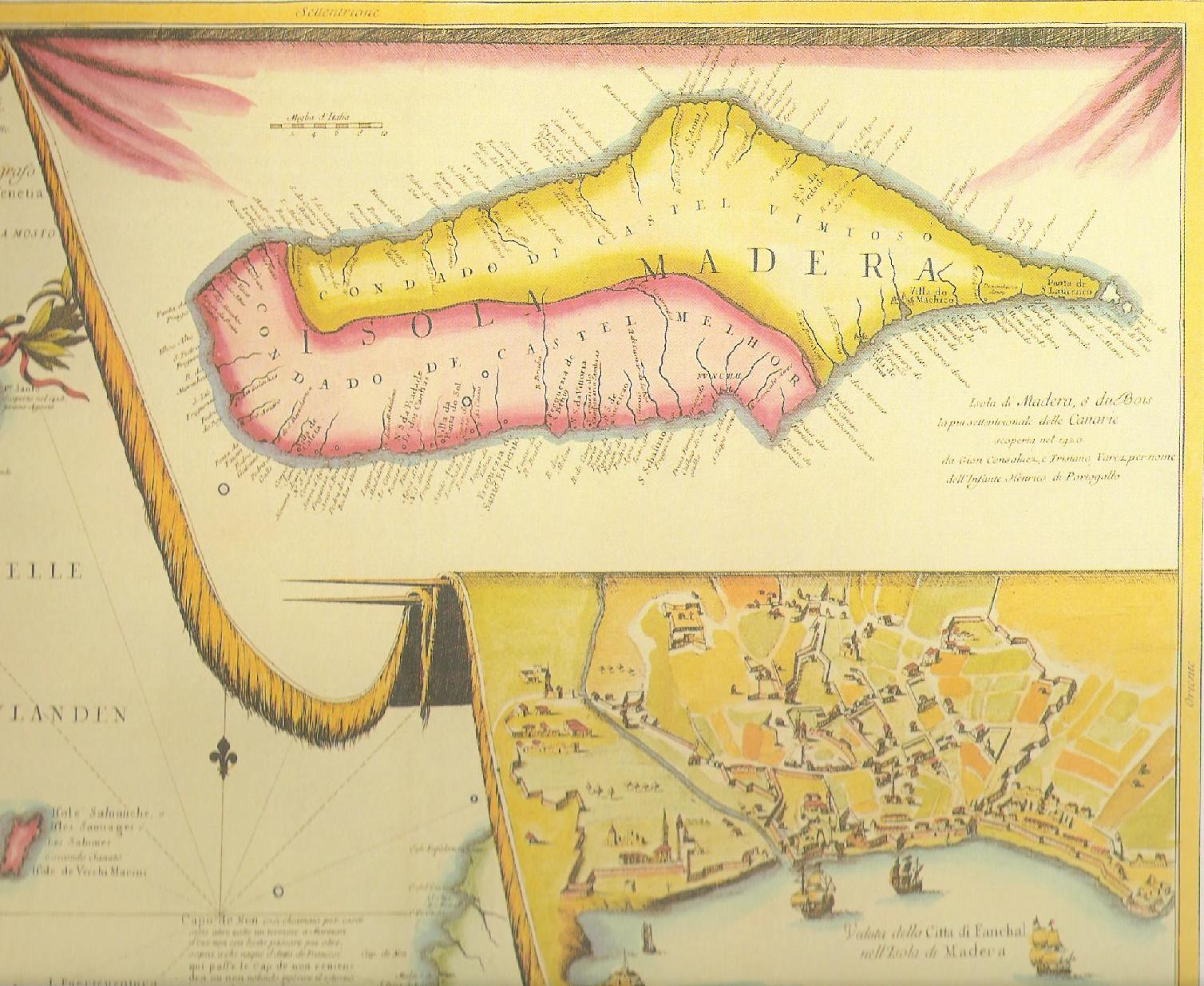
Madeira in a 17th-century map.

The recorded history of Madeira begins in 1419. There is no record of anyone living on the islands at that time. Portugal began populating the island in 1420.

== Pre-Portuguese times ==
Pliny mentions certain Purple Islands, the position of which with reference to the Fortunate Islands or Canaries might seem to indicate Madeira islands. Plutarch (Sertorius, 75 AD) referring to the military commander Quintus Sertorius (d. 72 BC), relates that after his return to Cádiz, "he met seamen recently arrived from Atlantic islands, two in number, divided from one another only by a narrow channel and distant from the coast of Africa 10,000 stadia. They are called Isles of the Blessed." The estimated distance from Africa, and the closeness of the two islands, seem to indicate Madeira and Porto Santo, which is much smaller than Madeira itself, and to the north east of it.

Tenth- or eleventh-century fragments of mouse bone found in Madeira, along with mitochondrial DNA of Madeiran mice, may indicate that the Vikings had come to Madeira (bringing mice with them), prior to colonisation by Portugal. However, because of “widespread trade routes, a mouse from Scandinavia could easily have boarded a ship in what today is Portugal and sailed over to Madeira, as well as the Azores” (as pointed out by the geographer Simon Connor). The geographer concludes that there is no evidence of a Scandinavian settlement or sighting of the islands and that the Portuguese were the ones that brought those mice from northern Europe to Madeira.

There is a romantic tale about two lovers, Robert Machim and Anna d'Arfet, in the time of the King Edward III of England, fleeing from England to France in 1346, who were driven off their course by a violent storm, and cast on the coast of Madeira at the place subsequently named Machico, in memory of one of them. On the evidence of a portolan contained in the Medici Atlas dated 1351, preserved at Florence, Italy, it would appear that Madeira had been discovered long before that date, possibly by Portuguese vessels under Genoese captains.

== 15th and 16th centuries ==
In 1419, two captains of Prince Henry the Navigator, João Gonçalves Zarco and Tristão Vaz Teixeira, were driven by a storm to the island they called Porto Santo, or Holy Harbour, in gratitude for their rescue from shipwreck. The next year an expedition was sent to populate the island, and, Madeira being described, they made for it, and took possession on behalf of the Portuguese crown, together with captain Bartolomeu Perestrello.

The discoveries of Porto Santo and Madeira were first described by Gomes Eanes de Zurara in Chronica da Descoberta e Conquista da Guiné. (Eng. version by Edgar Prestage in 2 vols. issued by the Hakluyt Society, London, 1896–1899: The Chronicle of Discovery and Conquest of Guinea.) Arkan Simaan relates these discoveries in French in his novel based on Azurara's chronicle: L’Écuyer d’Henri le Navigateur, published by Éditions l’Harmattan, Paris.

The islands started to be settled circa 1420 or 1425. On September 23, 1433, the name Ilha da Madeira (Madeira Island or "island of wood") appears in a map, by the first time, in a document. Since its discovery, the archipelago was property of the Order of Christ, which promoted its settlement.

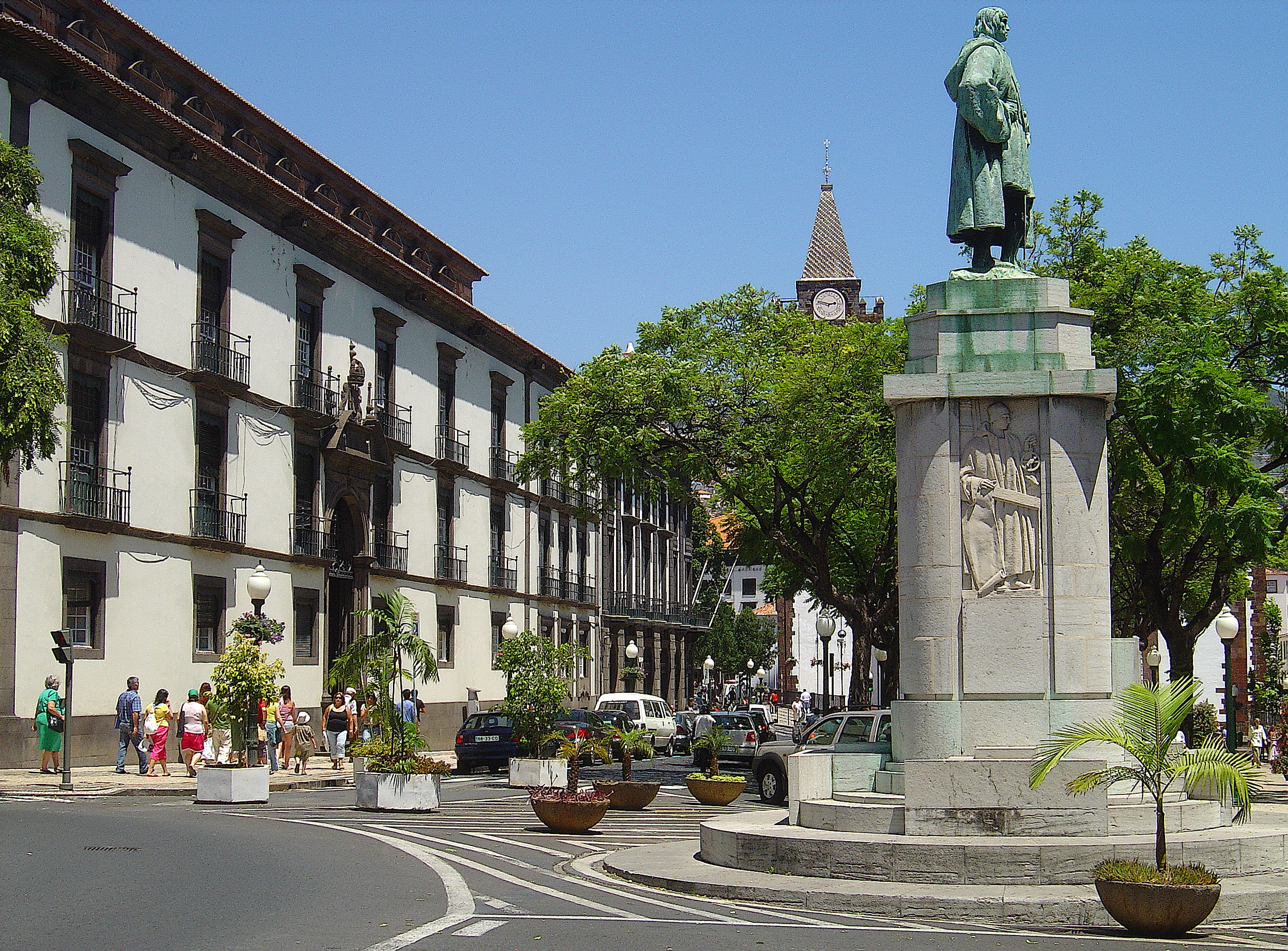
Statue of João Gonçalves Zarco.

The three captain-majors had led, in the first trip, their respective families, a small group of people of the minor nobility, people of modest conditions and some old prisoners of the kingdom. The settlement of Madeira and Porto Santo islands was a process defined by stages involving people from all over the kingdom.

In 1425, King John I officially made Madeira a full province of Portugal, handing it as a gift to Henry the Navigator. Settlement then began in earnest. Three strapping young nobles were sent to marry Zarco's daughters, and members of some of Portugal's grandest families came along to help increase the population.

It was from the Algarve that some of the early settlers set out. Many came with the important task of the landlord system employment. Servants, squires, knights and noblemen are identified as the ones who secured the beginning of the settlement. Later on, settlers came in big numbers from the north of Portugal, due to overpopulation, namely from the region of Entre Douro and Minho, who intervened specifically in the organization of the agricultural area.

The majority of settlers were fishermen and peasant farmers, who willingly left Portugal after it had been ravaged by the Black Death, and where the best farmlands were strictly controlled by the nobility. To gain the minimum conditions for the development of agriculture, they had to rough-hew a part of the dense forest of laurisilva. They started fires, which are said to have burned for seven years. The settlers constructed a large number of canals (levada]s), since in some parts of the island there was water in excess, while in other parts it was scarce. In the earliest times, fish constituted about half of the settlers' diet, together with vegetables and fruit. The first local agricultural activity with some success was the production of wheat. Initially, the settlers harvested wheat for their own sustenance, but later began to export it to Portugal.

According to a Portuguese legend, Polish King Władysław III survived the Battle of Varna (although the Ottomans claimed to have his head, his body in royal armor was never found) and later settled in Madeira. King Afonso V of Portugal granted him the lands in the Madalena do Mar district of Madeira, for the rest of his life. He was known there as Henrique Alemão (Henry the German) and married Senhorinha Anes (the King of Portugal was his best man), who gave him two sons. He established the church of Saint Catherine and Saint Mary Magdalene in Madalena do Mar (1471). There he was depicted in a painting as Saint Joachim meeting Saint Anne at the Golden Gate on a painting by Master of the Adoration of Machico (Mestre da Adoração de Machico) in the beginning of the 16th century.

In the decade of 1450, the wheat production began to fall. To get past the ensuing crisis, at the discretion of Infante Dom Henrique, settlers began the planting of sugarcane – rare in Europe and, therefore, considered a spice – promoting, for this, the introduction of Sicilian beets as the first specialized plant and the technology of its agriculture. Sugarcane production quickly afforded the Funchal metropolis economic prosperity. The production of sugarcane attracted adventurers and merchants from all parts of Europe, especially Italians, Basques, Catalans, Genoese, Portuguese and Flemish. This meant that, in the second half of the fifteenth century, the city of Funchal became a mandatory port of call for European trade routes.

Some years before his voyages across the Atlantic, Christopher Columbus, who at the time was a sugar trader, visited Madeira. It is generally accepted that he was born in Genoa, Italy, as Cristoforo Colombo. In Portugal it has been claimed that he was born in that country, as Salvador Fernandes Zarco but this is disputed. Columbus married the daughter of Bartolomeu Perestrello, Filipa Moniz, in Porto Santo and so was well aware of the profits to be made. He also understood the necessary growing conditions for sugar and the navigational technique known as the Volta do mar. Christopher Columbus lived and studied navigation in Madeira after his marriage.

Sugarcane cultivation and the sugar production industry developed until the 17th century. It became a leading factor in the island's economy, and increased the demand for labor. Apparently it was in Madeira that, in the context of sugar production, slaves were first used in plantations, sharing the work with waged settlers. The colonial system of sugar production was first put into practice on the island of Madeira, on a much smaller scale, and then successively applied, on a large scale, to other overseas production areas. Slaves consisted of Guanches from the nearby Canary islands, captured Berbers, and after further exploration of the African coast, West Africans. This pattern for sugar cultivation became the model that would soon be transferred to the Caribbean and Brazil. In Madeira it became evident that a warm climate, winds to work windmills for sugar crushing and easy access to the sea (for transportation of the raw sugar to Europe) were, together with slave labour, important components in what became a huge and highly profitable industry, which funded industrialisation and European expansion.

The first slaves that were brought to Madeira happened in 1452 and were Berbers and Guanches. According to historical records, slaves to Madeira were mainly imported from Northern Africa. Madeiran aristocracy at no point bred slaves or subjected them to the harsh regimented conditions found on slave plantations in Brazil, the West Indies or the rest of the Americas. Slave owners were only a small minority of the Madeiran population, and those who did own slaves owned only a few. There are recorded 2,232 slave owners in Madeira between 1400 and 1700, with their distribution being 1% in the XV century, 34% in the following and 65% in the XVII century. 89% of slavers owned one to five slaves. The most slaves ever owned by any individual was 14 belonging to João Esmeraldo. Slave prices kept rising each year, taking a toll even more in the slave population in Madeira. There are almost no traces of lineage coming from slaves in Madeira, due to low numbers and fertility rate. After the sugar trade collapsed in Madeira, there was no place for the slave, stranger to the European society ramified in the island. Many of them were sold to the more appealing American colonies and few that remained became house servants for aristocrats or fed the indigent and criminal class. Alberto Vieira, a highly respected expert in trans-Atlantic slavery, states that in the period of a deteriorated sugar trade in Madeira "the records show a high slave concentration in the urban areas revealing that we are faced with slavery of a domestic nature, with little or no relation to rural life." This meant that the slaves' daily life unrolls around the city near their masters, with their connection to rural life being nearly non-existent as guardians and workers of the land, both given to settlers.

In conclusion, this small scale of sugar production in the island was completely outmatched by Brazilian and São Tomean plantations. Madeiran sugar production declined in such a way that it was not enough for domestic needs, so that sugar was imported to the island from other Portuguese colonies. Sugar mills were gradually abandoned, with few remaining, which gave way to other markets in Madeira.

== 17th, 18th and 19th centuries ==
Since the 17th century, Madeira's most important product has been its wine, sugar production having since moved on to Brazil, São Tomé and Príncipe, and elsewhere. Madeira wine was perhaps the most popular luxury beverage in the colonial Western Hemisphere during the 17th and 18th centuries.

With the increase of commercial treaties with England, important English merchants settled on the Island and, ultimately, controlled the increasingly important island wine trade. The English traders settled in the Funchal as of the seventeenth century, consolidating the markets from North America, the West Indies and England itself. The Madeira Wine became very popular in the markets and it is also said to have been used in a toast during the Declaration of Independence by the Founding Fathers.

In the eighteenth and the nineteenth century, visitors to the island integrated four major groups: patients, travellers, tourists and scientists. Most visitors belonged to the moneyed aristocracy, with an endless list of aristocrats, princes, princesses and monarchs. As a result of a high demand for the season, there was a need to prepare guides for visitors. The first tourist guide of Madeira appeared in 1850 and focused on elements of history, geology, flora, fauna and customs of the island.

The British Empire occupied Madeira as a result of the Napoleonic Wars, a friendly occupation which concluded in 1814 when the island was returned to Portugal. The British first amicably occupied the island in 1801 whereafter Colonel William Henry Clinton became governor. A detachment of the 85th Regiment of Foot under Lieutenant-colonel James Willoughby Gordon garrisoned the island. After the Peace of Amiens, British troops withdrew in 1802, only to reoccupy Madeira in 1807 until the end of the Peninsular War in 1814. In 1846 James Julius Wood wrote a series of seven sketches of the island. In 1856, British troops recovering from cholera, and widows and orphans of soldiers fallen in the Crimean War, were stationed in Funchal, Madeira.

When, after the death of king John VI of Portugal, his usurper son Miguel of Portugal seized power from the rightful heir, his niece Maria II, and proclaimed himself 'Absolute King', Madeira held out for the Queen under the governor José Travassos Valdez until Miguel sent an expeditionary force and the defence of the island was overwhelmed by crushing force. Valdez was forced to flee to England under the protection of the Royal Navy (September 1828).

In 1891 a census revealed the population on Madeira to be 132,223 inhabitants.

== Twentieth century ==
Just before this the Germans were constructing what is today the "Hospital dos Marmeleiros" (the only building the Germans began to build), the Germans were given a tax break and did not need to pay tax on anything needed to construct the hospital. The site was left abandoned until 1930 when the Madeirans continued to build the Hospital dos Marmeleiros.

Locals say that the reason that the hospital construction was abandoned by the Germans was not just because of their colonization plans being discovered. It was that during the construction of the hospital the Germans needed special materials not available on Madeira, so it was agreed that Madeirans would take the materials up to the site from the German ship in the harbour. The strongest horses were used to bring up the wooden barrels. The local Madeiran with the strongest horses bringing up the materials was suspicious that what he was taking up the hill was heavier than what should be needed to construct the hospital, so he on purpose let one of the barrels roll down the hill and smash open. It is alleged that it was filled with rifles. When the locals looked inside what was already constructed they found ammunition and more guns. This caused the Madeirans to confiscate all German property in Madeira and stop the construction of the hospital.

=== World War I ===
In 1914 all German property was confiscated in Madeira, including the ship, the Colmar, built in 1912 which was interned in Madeira in 1914. In 1916 it was renamed Machico and in 1925 it was bought from the Portuguese Government and renamed Luso; in 1955 it was scrapped after grounding damage.

On 9 March 1916, Germany declared war on Portugal, followed by Portugal declaring war on Germany and starting to organise Portuguese troops to go to the Western Front. The effect of the Portuguese participation in World War I was first felt in Madeira on 3 December 1916 when the German U-boat, U-38, captained by Max Valentiner went into Funchal harbour on Madeira and torpedoed and sank 3 ships, CS Dacia (1,856 tons), SS Kanguroo (2,493 tons) and Surprise (680 tons). The commander of the French Gunboat Surprise and 34 of her crew (7 Portuguese) died in the attack. The Dacia, a British cable laying vessel, had previously undertaken war work off the coast of Casablanca and Dakar, was in the process of diverting the South American cable into Brest, France. Following the attack on the ships, the Germans proceeded to bombard Funchal for two hours from a range of about 2 miles (3 km). Batteries on Madeira returned fire and eventually forced the Germans to withdraw.

In 1917 on December 12, two German U-boats, U-156 and U-157 (captained by Max Valentiner) again bombarded Funchal, Madeira. This time the attack lasted around 30 minutes. Forty, 4.7 inch and 5.9 inch shells were fired. There were 3 fatalities and 17 wounded, In addition, a number of houses and Santa Clara church were hit.

A priest, José Marques Jardim, promised in 1917 to build a monument should peace ever return to Madeira. In 1927 at Terreiro da Luta he built a statue of Nossa Senhora da Paz (Our Lady of Peace) commemorating the end of World War I. It incorporates the anchor chains from the sunken ships from Madeira on 3 December 1916 and is over 5 metres tall.

Charles I, the last Emperor of the Austro-Hungarian Empire, went into exile in Madeira after his second unsuccessful coup d'état in Hungary. He died there on 1 April 1922 is buried in the Church of Our Lady of Monte. Charles I had tried in 1917 to secretly enter into peace negotiations with France. Although his foreign minister, Ottokar Czernin, was only interested in negotiating a general peace which would include Germany as well, Charles himself, in negotiations with the French with his brother-in-law, Prince Sixtus of Bourbon-Parma, an officer in the Belgian Army, as intermediary, went much further in suggesting his willingness to make a separate peace. When news of the overture leaked in April 1918, Charles denied involvement until the French Prime Minister Georges Clemenceau published letters signed by him. This led to Czernin's resignation, forcing Austria-Hungary into an even more dependent position with respect to its seemingly-wronged German ally. Determined to prevent a restoration attempt, the Council of Allied Powers had agreed on Madeira because it was isolated in the Atlantic and easily guarded.

=== 1931 Uprising ===
In February 1931 food shortages and economic stresses during the Great Depression led to riots over the price of flour. In April a general exiled for opposing the Lisbon regime, Adalberto Gastão de Sousa Dias, led a full scale revolt which briefly spread to the Azores and Portuguese Guinea. The Madeira uprising was suppressed a month later by military and naval forces from the mainland.

=== World War II ===
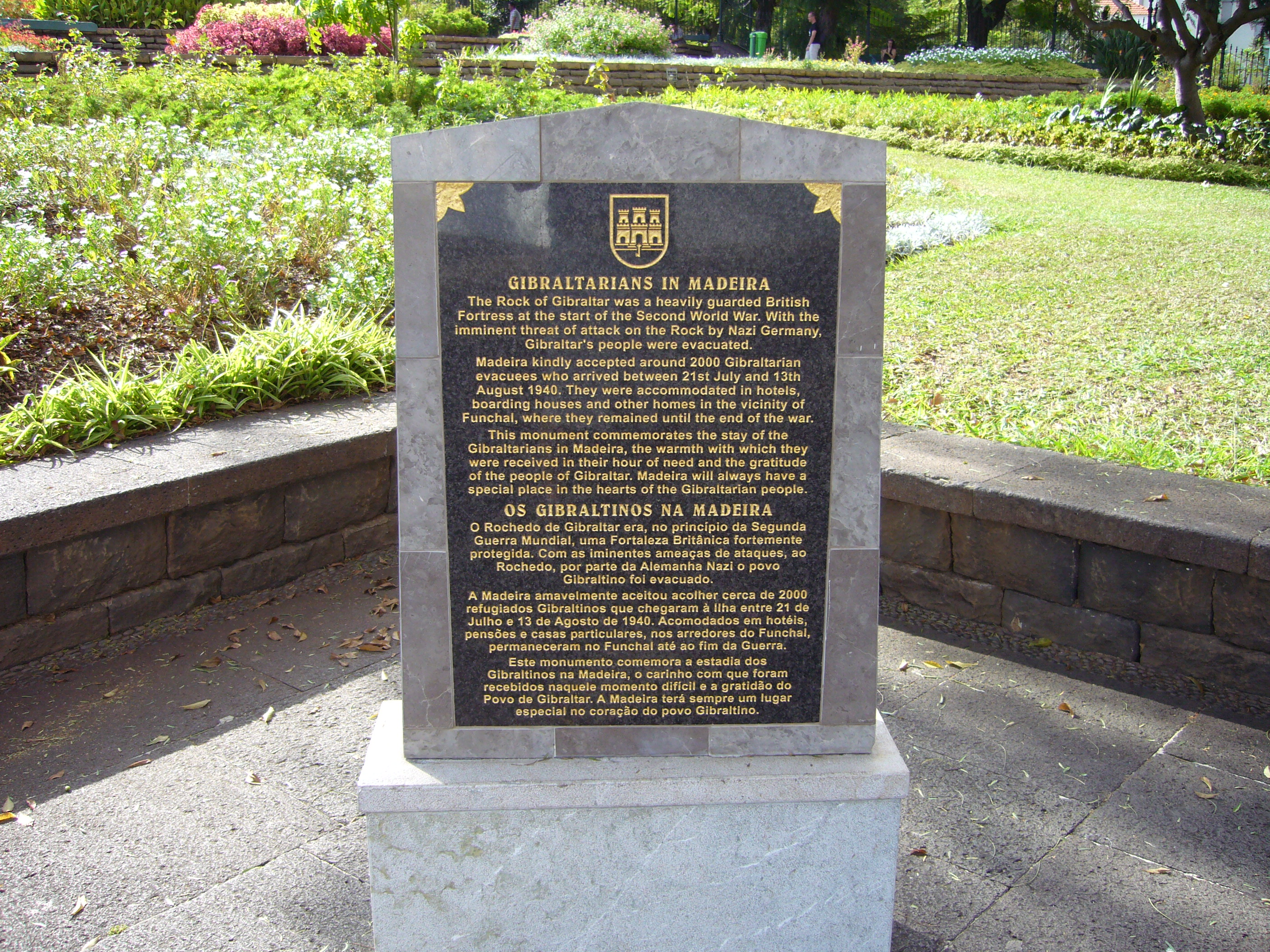
Monument to remember the Gibraltarian evacuees in Madeira

Portugal in World War II was neutral and become non-belligerent in 1943. Salazar's decision to stick with the oldest alliance in the world, cemented by the Treaty of Windsor (1386) between Portugal and England (still in force today), meant that the Anglo-Portuguese Alliance allowed Madeira to take in refugees on a humanitarian basis; in July 1940, around 2,000 Gibraltarian evacuees were shipped to Madeira due to the high risk of Gibraltar being attacked by either Spain or Germany; the Germans had planned but never initiated an attack on the British colony, code-named Operation Felix.

The Gibraltarians are fondly remembered on the island, where they were called Gibraltinos. Some Gibraltarians had married Madeirans during this time and stayed after the war was over. Tito Benady, a historian on Gibraltar Jewry, noted that when some 200 Jews of the 2000 evacuees from Gibraltar were evacuated as non-combatants to Funchal at the start of World War II, they found a Jewish cemetery that belonged to the Abudarham family. This is the same family after whom the Abudarham Synagogue in Gibraltar was named.

On November 12, 1940, Adolf Hitler issued Führer Directive No. 18, which provided the possibility to invade Portugal. He stated "I also request that the problem of occupying Madeira and the Azores should be considered, together with the advantages and disadvantages which this would entail for our sea and air warfare. The results of these investigations are to be submitted to me as soon as possible."

On the May 28th 1944, the first party of evacuees left Madeira for Gibraltar; by the end of 1944, only 520 non-priority evacuees remained on the island.

In 2008, a monument was made in Gibraltar and shipped to Madeira, where it has been erected next to a small chapel at Santa Caterina park in Funchal. The monument is a gift and symbol of everlasting thanks given by the people of Gibraltar to the island of Madeira and its inhabitants.

The city of Funchal and Gibraltar were twinned on 13 May 2009 by their then-mayors, the mayor of Funchal Miguel Albuquerque and the mayor of Gibraltar, who had been an evacuee from Gibraltar to Madeira Solomon Levy, respectively. The mayor of Gibraltar then had a meeting with the then-President of Madeira Alberto João Jardim.

== Autonomy ==
In the wake of the 1974 Carnation Revolution in Lisbon, graffiti in Funchal announced the birth of a Madeiran independence movement, The Madeira Archipelago Liberation Front (Portuguese: Frente de Libertação do Arquipélago da Madeira), or FLAMA. Between 1974 and 1978 FLAMA carried out around 200 bomb attacks, their most audacious being an attempt in 1978 to assassinate the visiting left-wing presidential candidate Otelo Saraiva de Carvalhoa. Comprising anti-communist students (FLAMA referred to the mainland Portuguese as "Cubans"), and supported by conservatives unreconciled to the overthrow of the Estado Novo and its colonial empire, FLAMA may represented more a reaction among regional elites to the revolutionary left than truly ethnic or separatist sentiment. The movement wound down when the left failed to triumph in parliamentary elections, and once autonomous administration for Madeira was established under the new constitution..

On 1 July 1976, Portugal granted political autonomy to Madeira, celebrated on Madeira Day. The region now has its own government and legislative assembly. In September 1978, the Madeira flag was adopted. The blue part symbolizes the sea surrounding the island and the yellow represents the abundance of life on the island. The red cross of the Order of Christ, with a white cross on it, is identical to the one on the flag of Prince Henry's ships that discovered the island. In September 1980, the official anthem was adopted.

In 1980, the Madeira International Business Centre was created.

From 1976 to 2019, the center-right Social Democratic Party (PPD/PSD) had a majority of MPs in the regional parliament and ruled on its own. During most of that time, from 1978 to 2015 (37 years), the regional government was headed by Alberto João Jardim, making him one of the longest-serving democratically elected leaders in the world.

In the 2019 election, PPD/PSD won once again, but lost the majority it had always held. Now it governs in coalition with the Popular Party.

== See also ==
- History of the Azores
- Funchal history and timeline
