= Transport in Madeira =

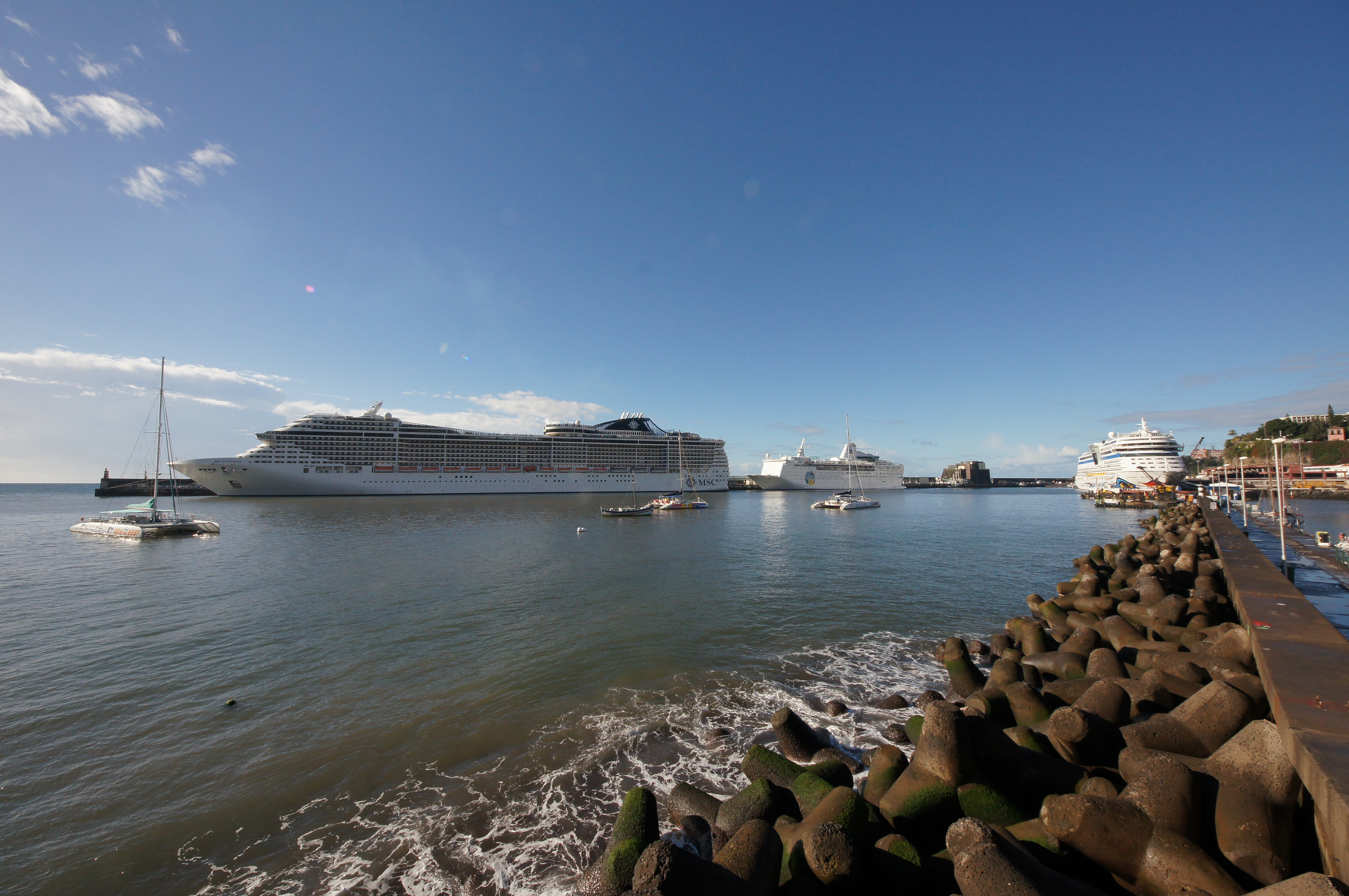
The busy port of Funchal

The Madeira islands and Funchal have an extensive public transportation system. Travel between the two main islands is by plane or by ferries, the latter also allowing for the transportation of vehicles. Visiting the interior of the islands is now easy, due to major road developments, known as the Vias rápidas, on the islands during Portugal's economic boom.

European Union citizens of the Schengen Treaty area can enter the islands freely, while those from other regions need identification.

== Human-powered transport ==
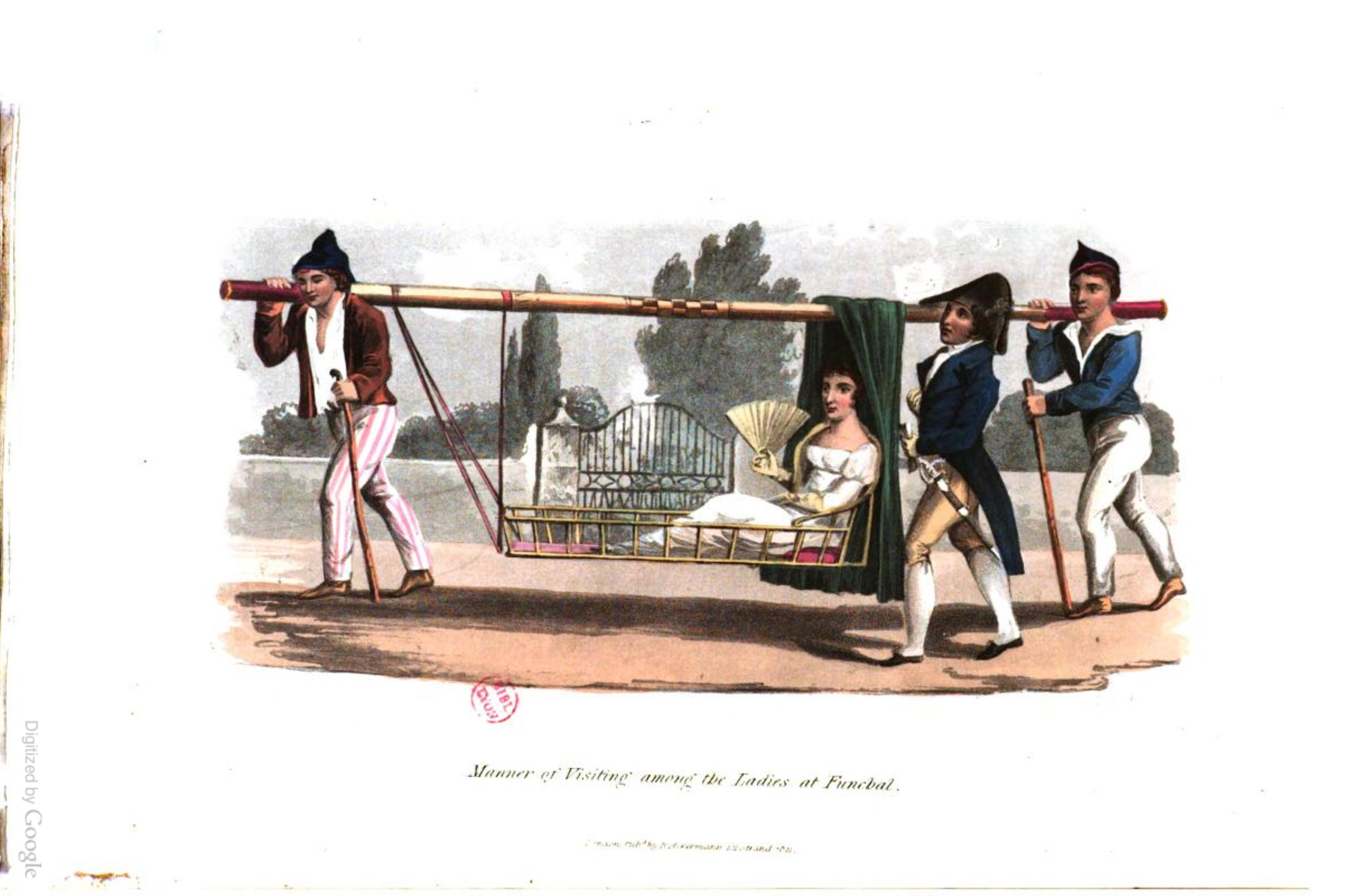
Hammock litter with porters in Madeira, 1821

In the past Madeira had a mode of transport that no longer exists called a hammock litter. It was introduced by Robert Reid Kalley in the 19th century.

== Air transport ==
The islands have two airports, one in Santa Cruz (known as Funchal Airport (FNC)) on the Island of Madeira and the other in the city of Vila Baleira on Porto Santo Island. Flights to the islands are mostly made from Lisbon and Porto, but there are also direct flights from other major European cities and other countries, like Brazil and Venezuela.

The first seaplane to land in Madeira was Felixstowe F.3, captained Carlos Viegas Gago Coutinho by on 22 March 1921, Madeira then had regular Seaplane services from 1949 to 1958 which were operated by Aquila Airways, which had flights from Southampton, Jersey and Lisbon to Madeira. Winston Churchill used the service regularly. Captain Harry Frank Broadbent who flew as captain for Aquila Airways, then worked for ARTOP Linhas Aéreas as an instructor pilot, ARTOP took over the route in 1958, also operated seaplanes from Lisbon to Madeira.

On 9 November 1958, Captain Harry Frank Broadbent accompanied by co-pilot Thomas Rowell, four other crew and 30 passengers, piloted Martin PBM Mariner (CS-THB, named "Porto Santo") owned by ARTOP Linhas Aéreas, from Cabo Ruivo Seaplane Base near Lisbon, headed for Funchal.

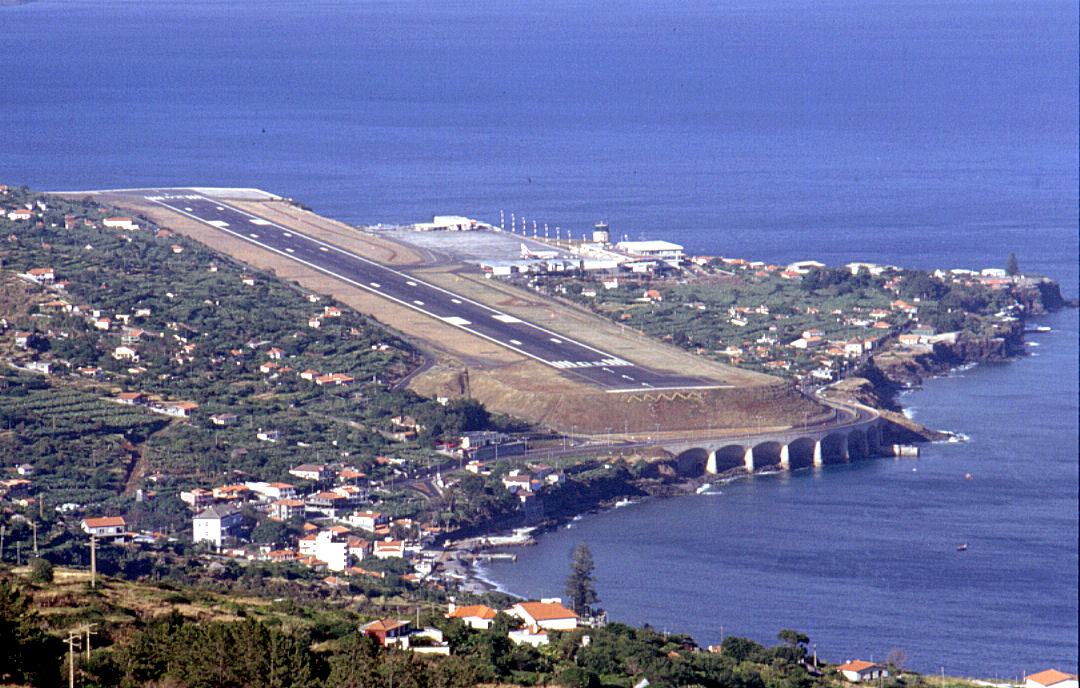
Funchal Airport runway in 1990

About an hour into the flight, when it would have been over the Atlantic Ocean about 280 kilometres (150 nautical miles) southwest of Lisbon, a radio message code "QUG" was received, meaning "I am forced to land immediately". After several days of searching by air and sea by US and Portuguese authorities, no further trace was found of the aircraft or its crew or passengers.

Funchal Airport became operative in July 1964. It was dreaded among airliner pilots for its runway, which was not only short (the largest planes that could be accommodated were the Airbus A320 and Boeing 737) but was also built on a high embankment which fell away abruptly towards the sea. It often experienced updrafts which tended to lift landing aircraft in an unpredictable fashion. In an accident on November 19, 1977 that killed over 150 people, TAP Portugal Flight 425, landing in unfavorable weather, overshot the runway and dropped off the cliff. Subsequently, the runway was realigned and extended from 1,800m to 2,481m, enabling most modern passenger airplanes (including the Boeing 747-400) to visit the island.

== Water transport ==
The Port of Funchal was the only major port in Madeira until 2007, when it became fully dedicated to passenger transport – cruise ships and ferries – and other tourist-related boats and yachts. In that year all remaining fishing activity and cargo trade was moved to the newly developed port of Caniçal, 19 km (12 mi) to the east.

A ferry service between Funchal and Portimão, on the mainland, provided by Naviera Armas, sailed weekly from 2008, but was discontinued in 2013, due to a dispute over harbour fees. In summer 2018 it was reinstated, but as a seasonal service from July to September. It was operated by Grupo Sousa using Naviera Armas's ship Volcán de Tijarafe, which had provided the crossing prior to the 2013 discontinuation, with a maximum speed of 23 kn (43 km/h). The crossing takes around 24 hours.

A ferry called Lobo Marinho runs in two hours between Funchal and Porto Santo Island.

Funchal is frequently used as a stop-over by transatlantic ships, en route from Europe to the Caribbean, as it is the northernmost Atlantic island that lies in the path of the westerlies.

== Cable transport ==
There are 7 aerial tramways, two of which are in Funchal.

Previously there was a steam-powered cog railway (Monte Railway) from Funchal to Monte, which operated between 1893 and 1943, and went further up to Terreiro da Luta at 867 m above sea level.

== Land transport ==
Bus companies such as Horários do Funchal, Rodoeste and SAM (Sociedade de automóveis da Madeira) have been operating for over one hundred years, and they have regularly scheduled routes to all points of interest on the island.

The Direcção Regional dos Transportes Terrestres is the department of the regional government responsible for land transportation in the autonomous region.

== Gallery ==
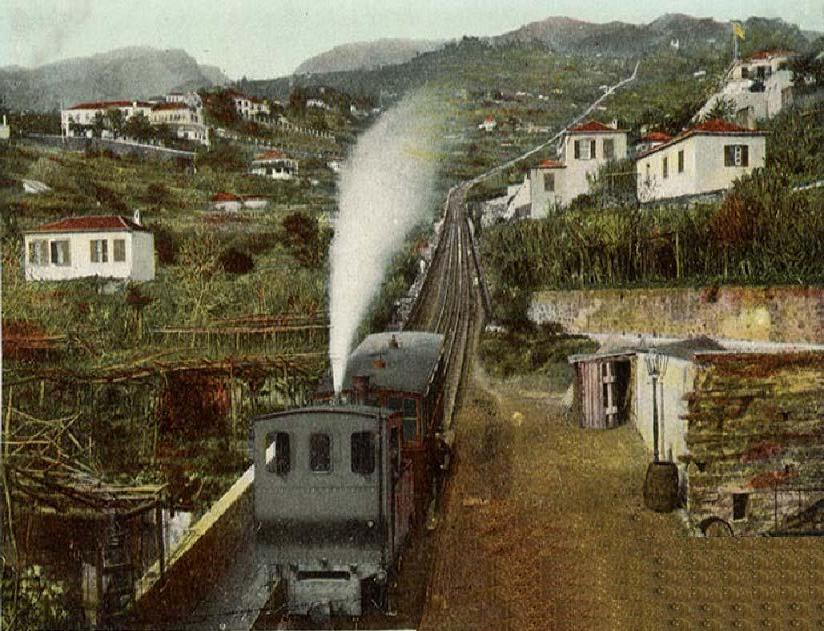
Old cog railway

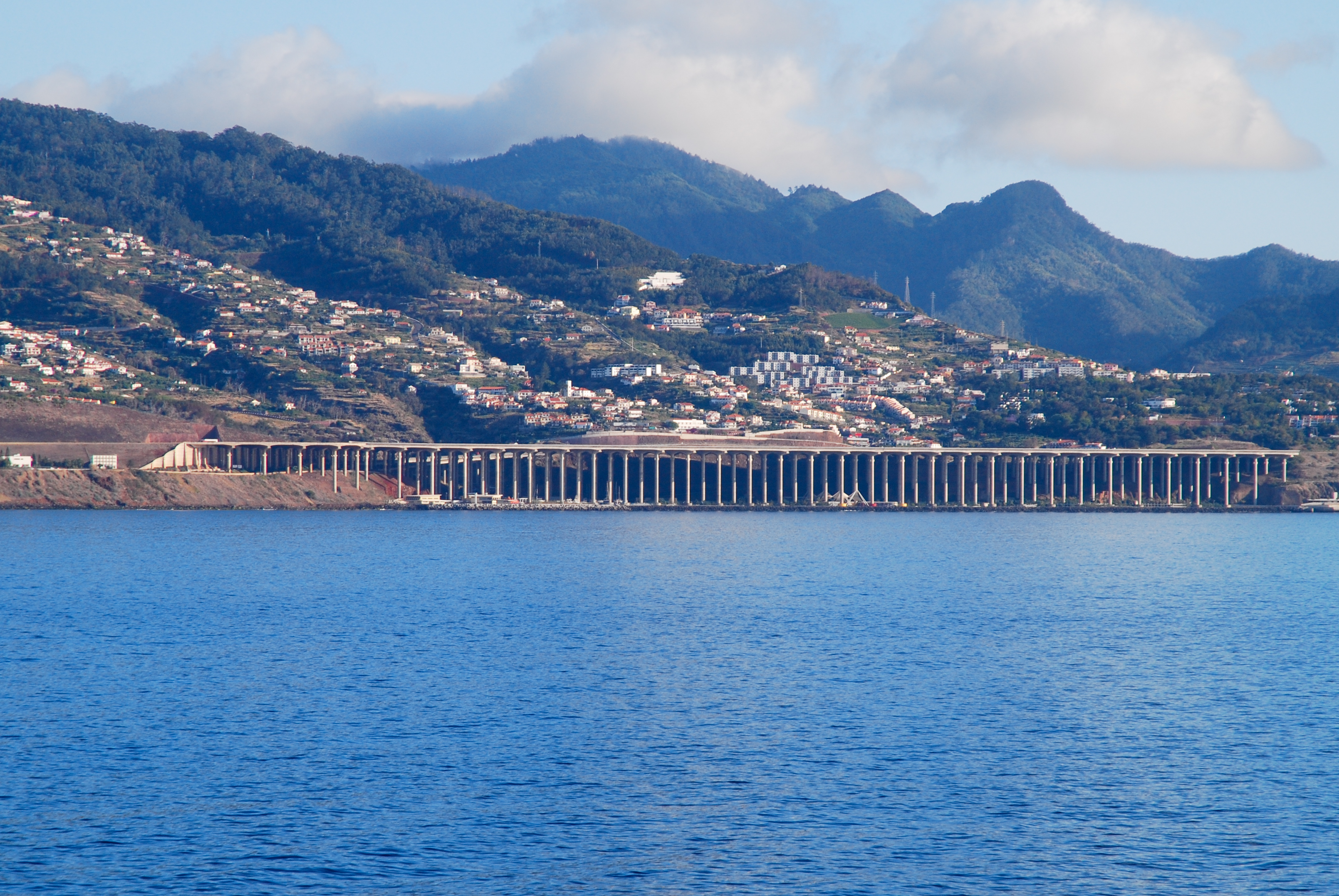
Funchal Airport extended runway

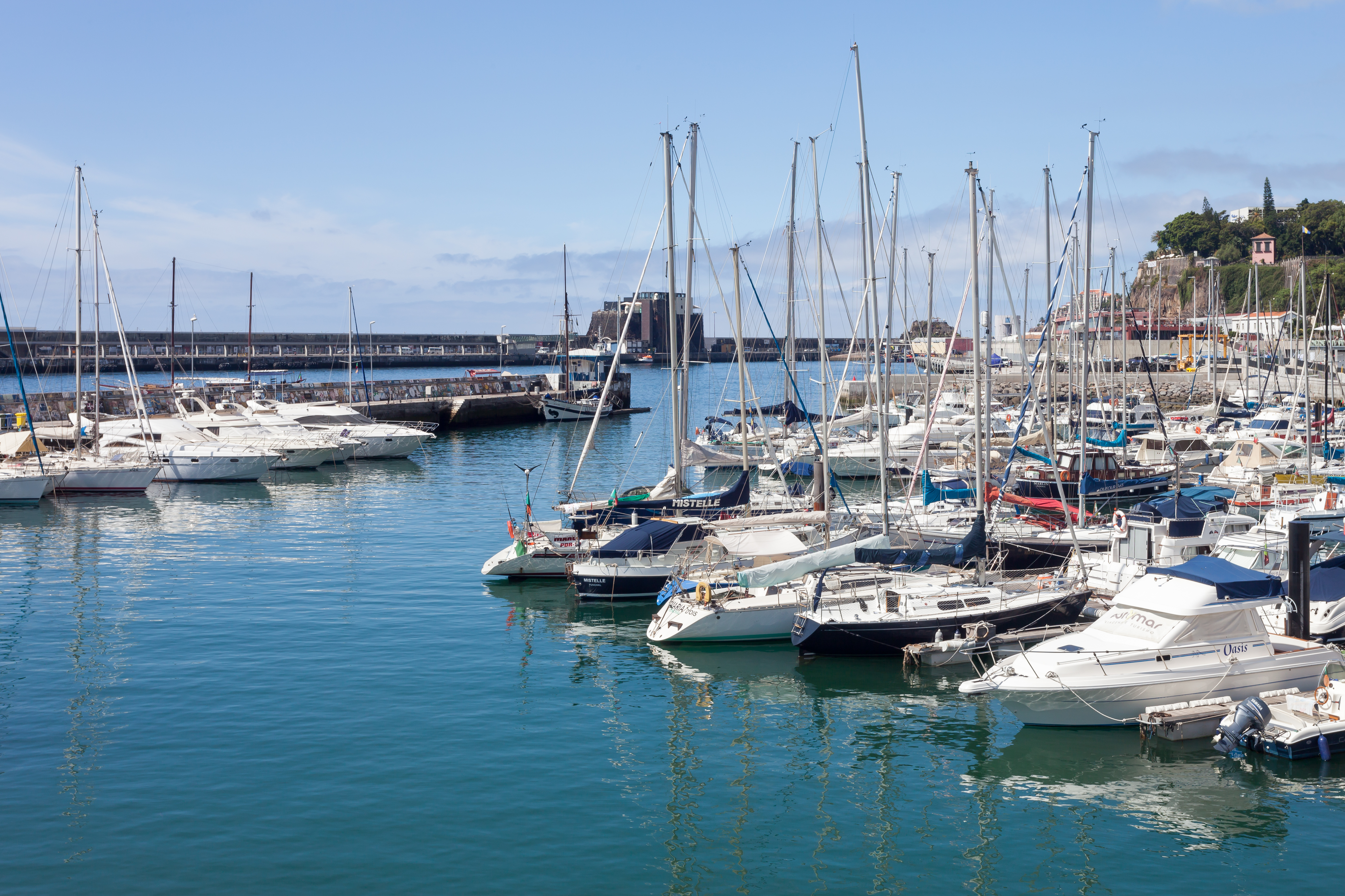
The Port of Funchal

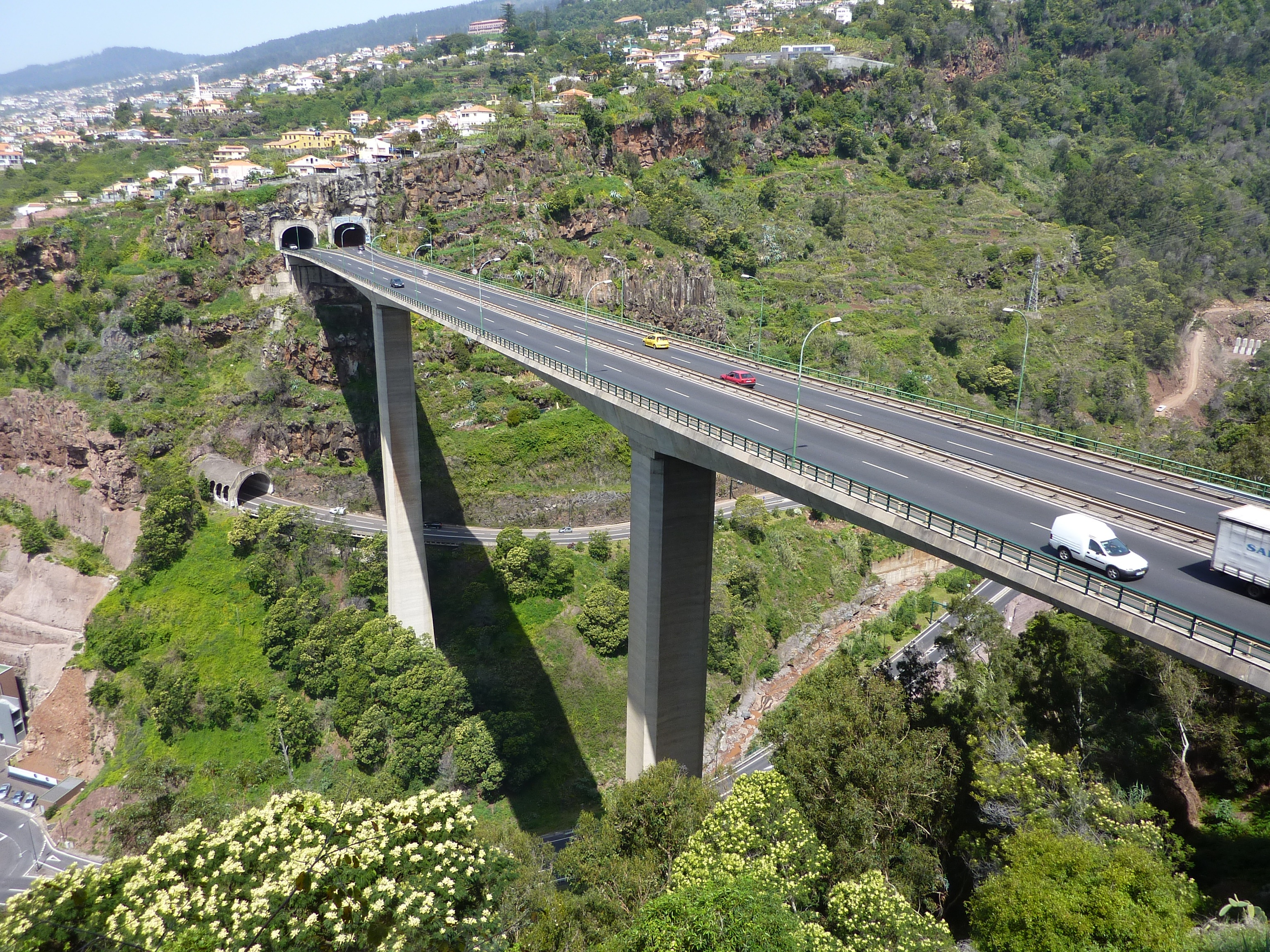
João Gomes Bridge, part of the VR1, Madeira

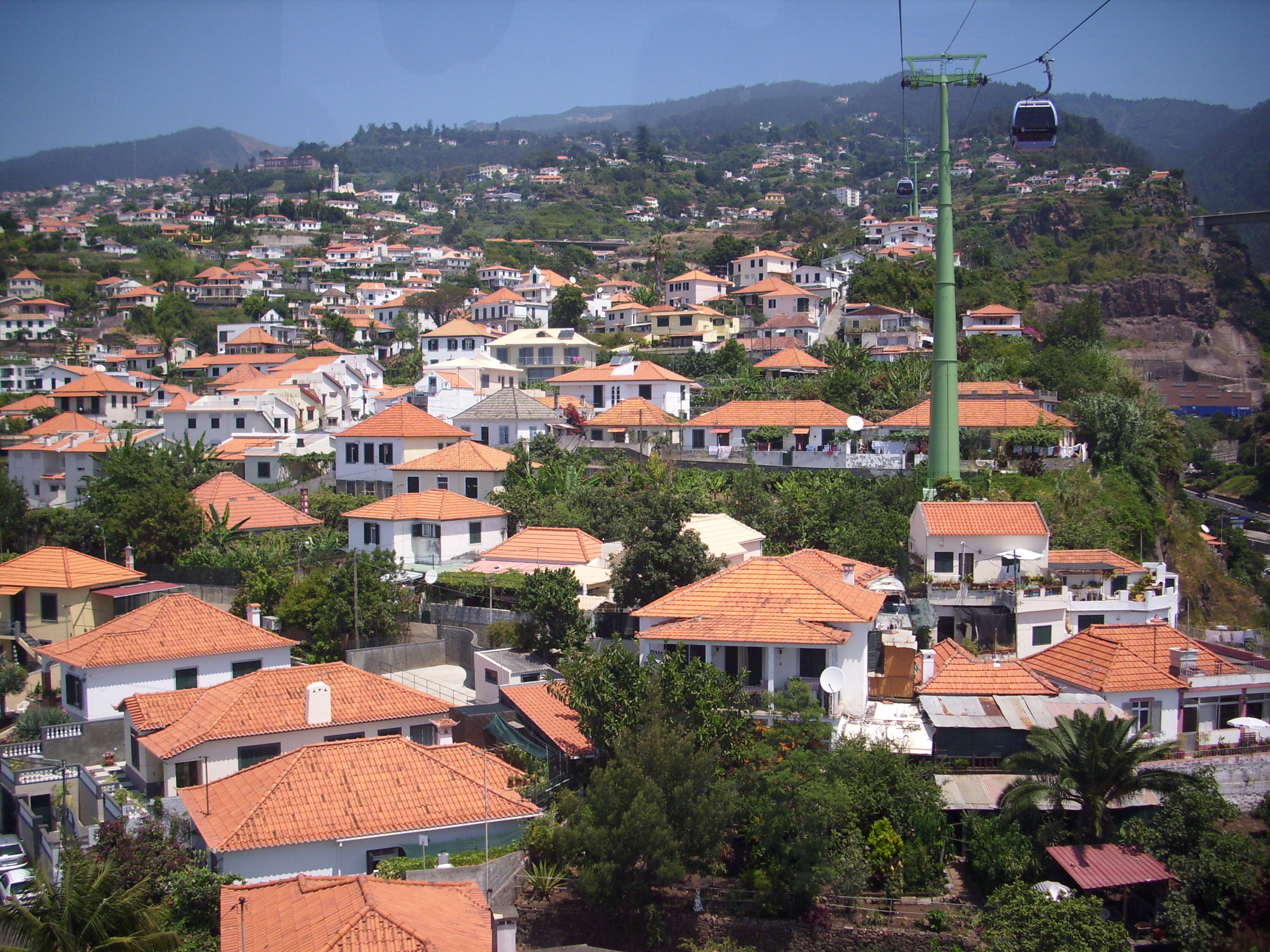
Funchal Cable Car

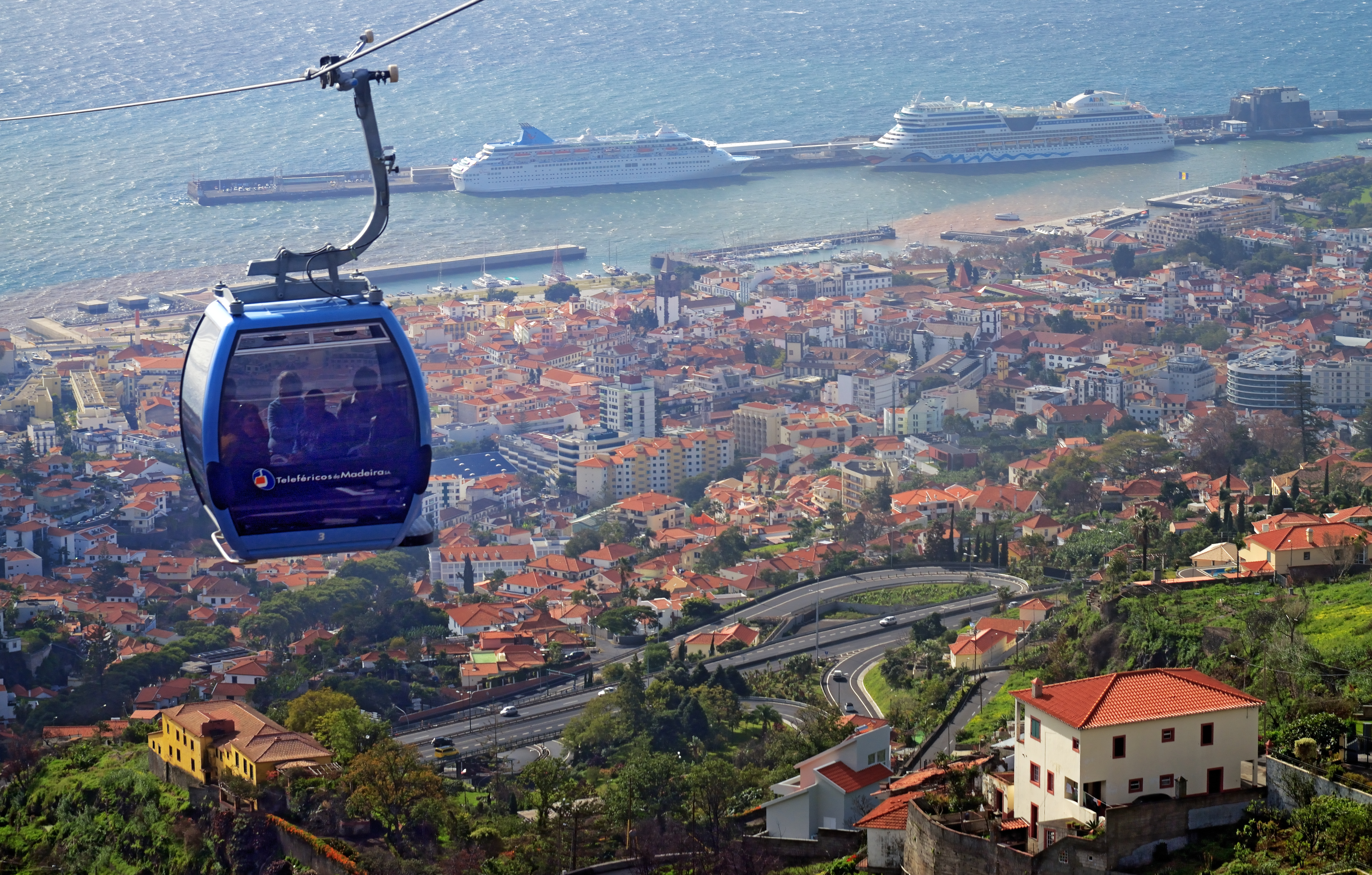
Gondola of Teleférico Funchal-Monte

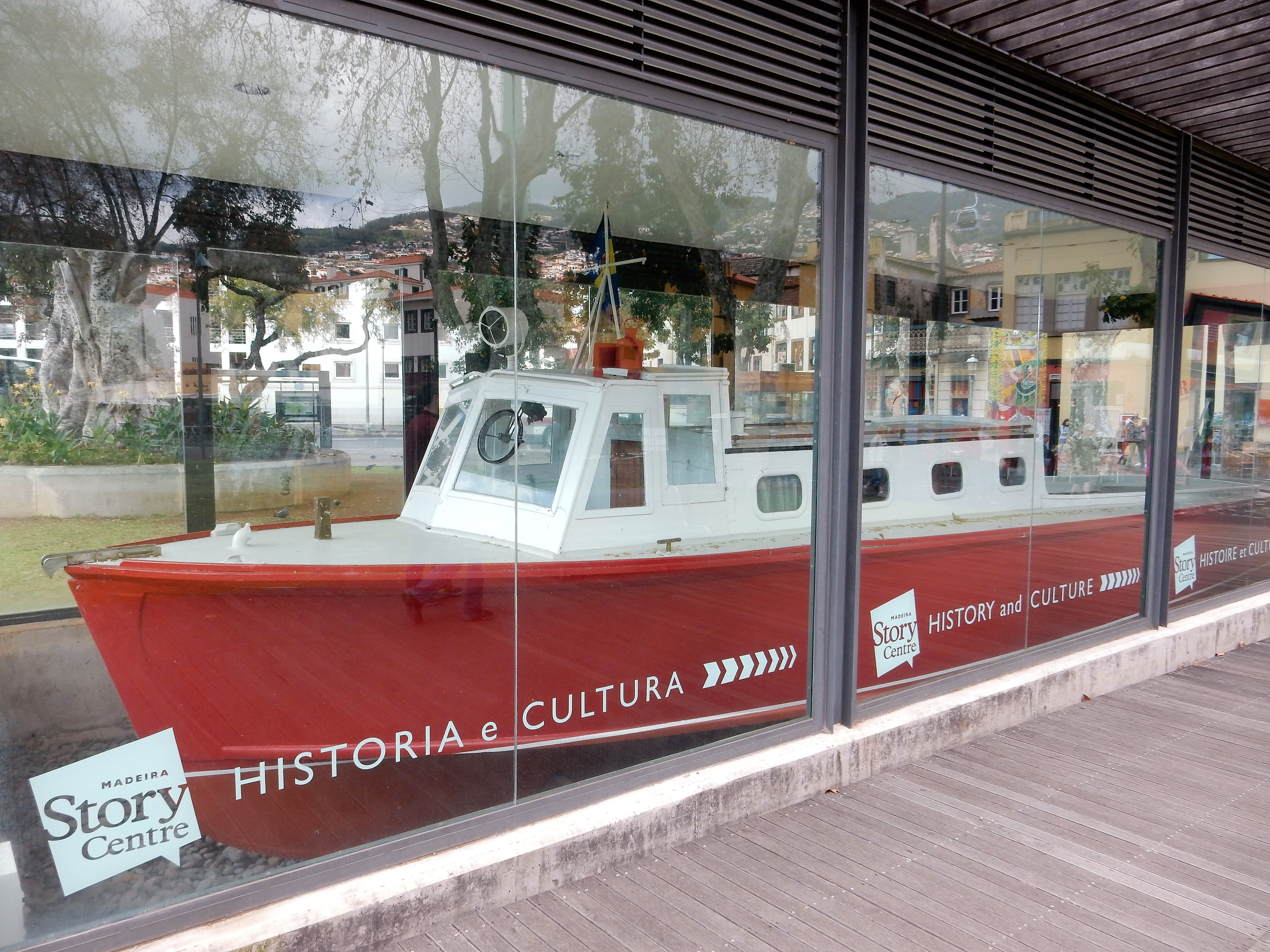
Boat used to take passengers from the seaplane operated by Aquila Airways, on display in Almirante Reis Park, Funchal
