= Terreiro da Luta =

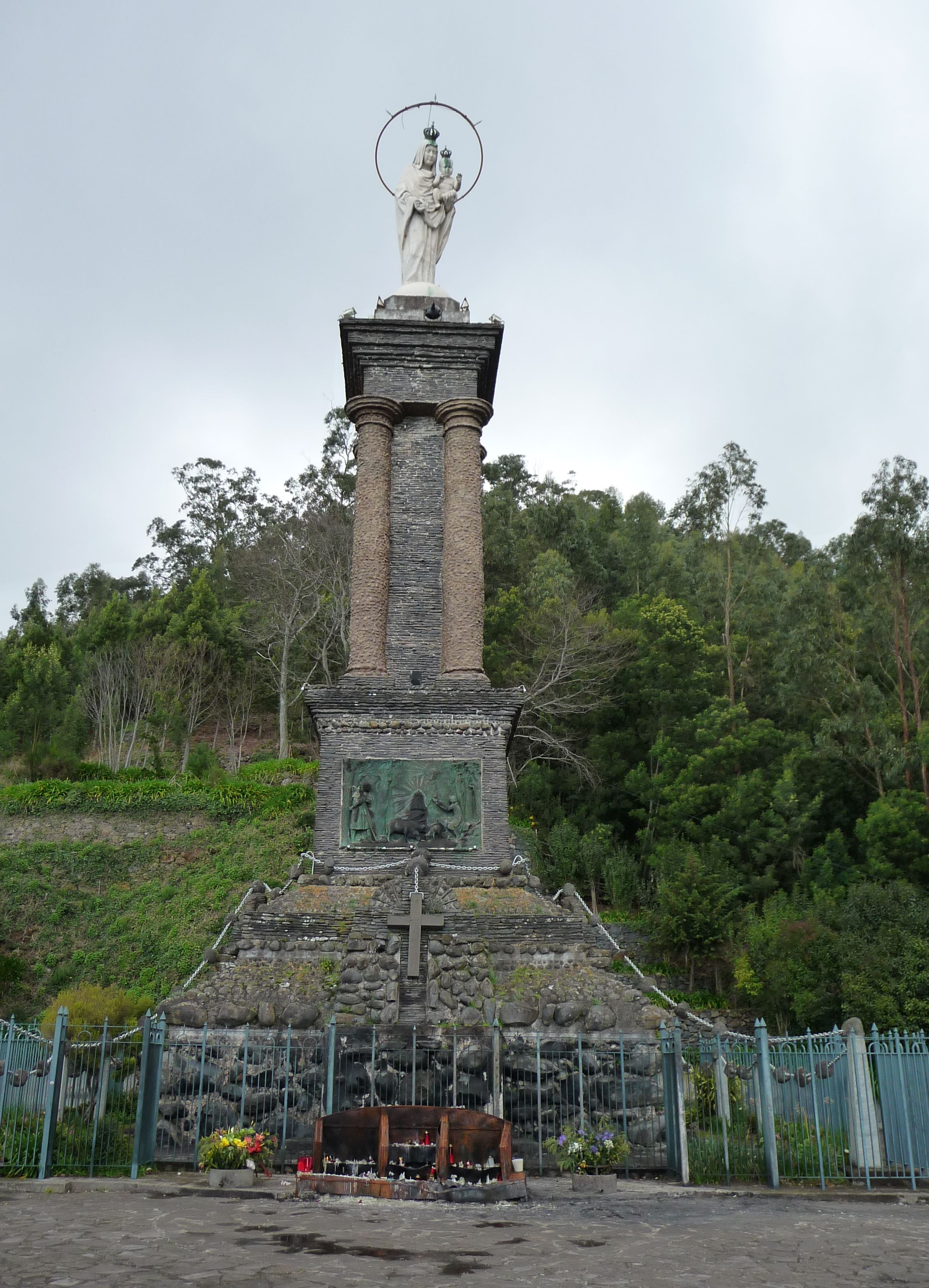
- Nossa Senhora da Paz Statue in Terreiro da Luta
- Interactive map of Terreiro da Luta
- Location: Monte (Funchal), Madeira
- Coordinates: 32°41′03.3″N 16°53′55.8″W
- Height: 5.5 metres (18 ft) tall with its pedestal
- Completion date: August 14, 1927

Terreiro da Luta is located north of Monte (Funchal) and the area was once the last stop on the only cog railway (Monte Railway) in Madeira. It is also where the Our Lady of Peace sanctuary (Portuguese: Nossa Senhora da Paz) is located.

== History ==
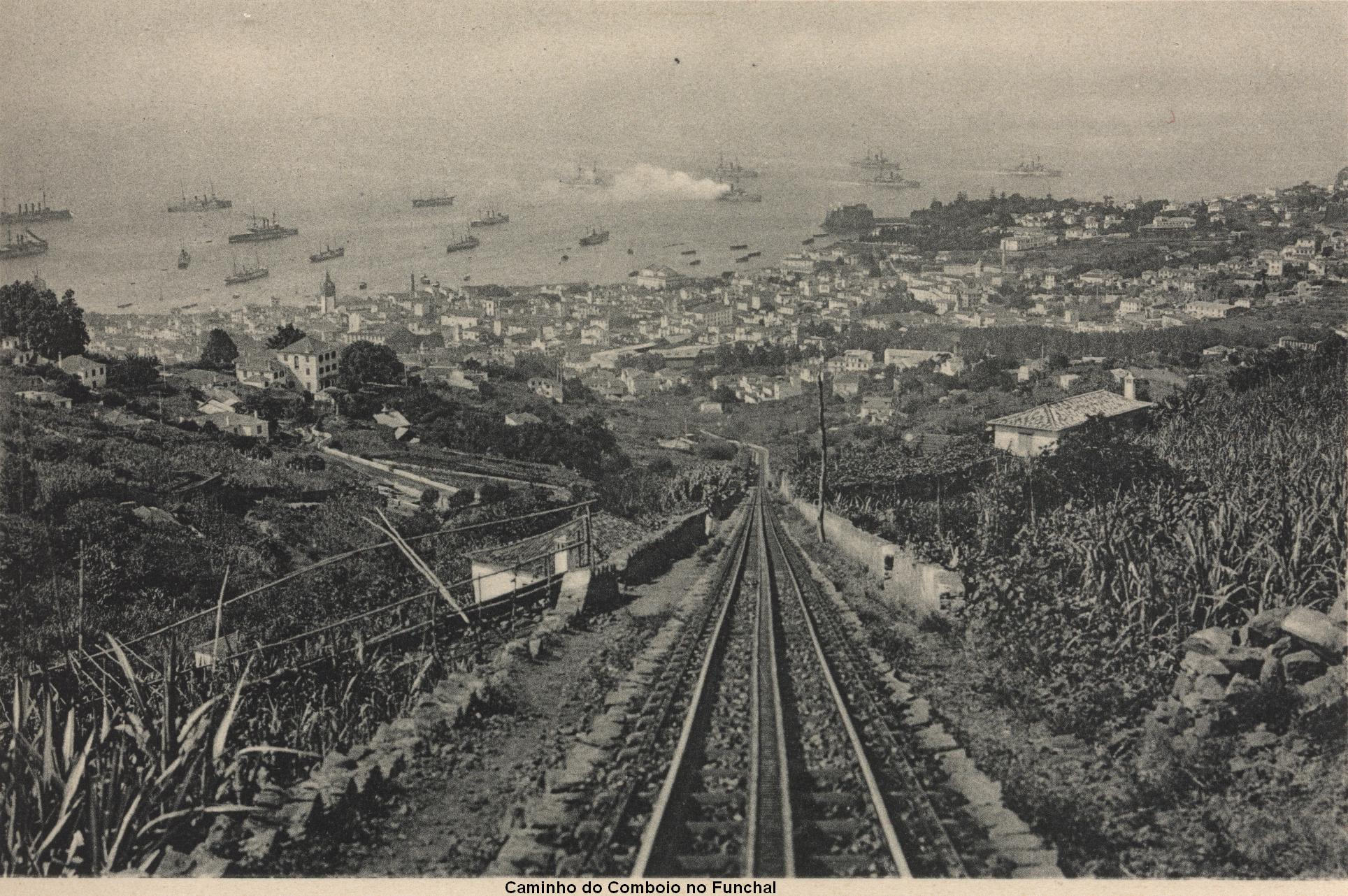
The cog railway vista, looking down to the harbour of Funchal, showing the commercial ships in the harbour

Between 1893 and 1943, the area was connected to Funchal by Madeira's only cog railway.

The Our Lady of Peace sanctuary (Portuguese: Nossa Senhora da Paz) statue which is supported by 4 Roman columns, is located here. It was built after the attacks on Madeira during world war 1, which were first felt in Madeira on December 3, 1916, when the German U-boat, U-38, captained by Max Valentiner went into the Port of Funchal in Madeira and torpedoed and sank 3 ships, CS Dacia (1,856 tons), SS Kanguroo (2,493 tons) and Surprise (680 tons). The commander of the French Gunboat Surprise and 34 of her crew (7 Portuguese) died in the attack. The Dacia, a British cable laying vessel, had previously undertaken war work off the coast of Casablanca and Dakar, was in the process of diverting the South American cable into Brest, France. Following the attack on the ships, the Germans proceeded to bombard Funchal for two hours from a range of about 2 miles (3 km). Batteries on Madeira returned fire and eventually forced the Germans to withdraw.

In 1917 on December 12, two German U-boats, U-156 and U-157 (captained by Max Valentiner) again bombarded Funchal, Madeira. This time the attack lasted around 30 minutes. Forty, 4.7 inch and 5.9 inch shells were fired. There were 3 fatalities and 17 wounded, In addition, a number of houses and Santa Clara church were hit.

A priest José Marques Jardim, promised in 1917 to build a monument should peace ever return to Madeira. In 1927 at Terreiro da Luta he built a statue of Nossa Senhora da Paz (Our Lady of Peace) commemorating the end of World War I. It incorporates the anchor chains from the sunken ships from Madeira on December 3, 1916, and is over 5 metres tall.
