= Max Valentiner =

WW1 German U-boat commander (1883-1949)

Christian August Max Ahlmann Valentiner
- Max Valentiner
- Born: 15 December 1883; Tondern, Kingdom of Prussia
- Died: 19 July 1949 (aged 65); Sønderborg, Denmark
- Military career
- Allegiance: German Empire; Nazi Germany
- Branch: Imperial German Navy; Kriegsmarine
- Service years: 1902–19; 1940–45
- Rank: Kapitän zur See
- Commands: U-10, 1 July 1911 – 1 April 1914; U-3, 23 August 1914 – 27 October 1914; U-38, 5 December 1914 – 15 September 1917; U-157, 22 September 1917 – 20 July 1918
- Conflicts: U-boat Campaign (World War I)
- Awards: Rettungsmedaille; Order of the Crown 4th class; Knight's Cross with Swords of the Royal House Order of Hohenzollern; Pour le Mérite

Captain Christian August Max Ahlmann Valentiner (15 December 1883 – 19 July 1949) was a German U-boat commander during World War I. He was the third highest-scoring U-boat commander of the war, and was awarded the Pour le Mérite for his achievements.

He was also listed as a war criminal by the Allies, for killing hundreds of civilians by sinking the passenger liner Persia without warning on 30 December 1915, contrary to international law.

== Early life ==
The eldest of the four children of Otto Friedrich Valentiner and Mathilde Julie Valentiner, Valentiner was born in Tondern (Tønder), Province of Schleswig-Holstein.

In 1882, the family moved to Ketting on Als where his father held a job as a priest for two years, then moving to Sonderburg (Sønderborg). Valentiner started his time in school in Ketting, then Augustenburg (Augustenborg) and later in Sonderburg on Reimers school.

== Pre-war military service ==
At the age of 18, he joined the Imperial German Navy of the German Empire on 1 April 1902 as a Seekadett on the school ship Moltke. On 15 August 1902 he saved a ship's boy from drowning in Swinemünde's harbor, and received his first of many decorations, the Rettungsmedaille (life-saving medal).

In 1903, Valentiner joined the naval school where he attended many courses, especially in diving, his preferred topic. He ended his training on the Hansa. On 14 May 1903 he saved an able seaman in Heligoland harbour from the waves and certain death, and was awarded the Order of the Crown Medal for his courage and valour in action.

On 29 September 1905 he was promoted to Leutnant zur See and in 1907 he became an officer on SMS Braunschweig. He was promoted again on 30 March 1908 to Oberleutnant zur See. From 1908 to 1910, Valentiner was company commander for 1. Matrosen-Artillerie-Abteilung in Kiel.

In 1911, Valentiner became an officer on the U-boat salvage ship SMS Vulkan. In this job, on 17 January 1911, he saved all 30 men of U-3 by getting them out via a torpedo tube after it sank in Kiel Harbour due to an unclosed valve in the ventilation shaft. Among the saved crew was Otto Weddigen, later the commander of U-9, and Paul Clarrendorf, the commander of U-boot-Abnahme-Kommando in Kiel which enlisted U-boat crews. Valentiner received the Order of the Crown 4th class for the life-saving mission.

On 1 July 1911, Valentiner took command of the new U-boat U-10. On board he showed incredible skill and boldness and on training manoeuvres he sank several ships with drill torpedoes without ever being sighted. His performance literally changed the German vision of U-boat warfare.

On 22 March 1914 Valentiner was promoted to Kapitänleutnant and nine days later he became a teacher at the U-boat school in Kiel, a position he held until the outbreak of World War I on 4 August 1914, when the United Kingdom declared war on the German Empire.

== World War I ==
When World War I broke out, Valentiner took command of U-3, the U-boat on which he three years earlier saved 30 men from dying. His orders were to sink Russian warships in the Baltic Sea, but he failed, and blamed the old U-boat which did not have the capabilities of the newer boats in the Kaiserliche Marine. Valentiner returned to base without any successes and was relieved from his command on 27 October 1914. He was sent to Berlin to face Prince Heinrich and explain the problems with the older U-boats. The prince was furious and sent him away.

When Valentiner returned to Kiel he was quite surprised to learn that he was to take command of the newest U-boat, U-38. He was also allowed to choose his own officers from the U-boat school.

From 5 December 1914 to 15 September 1917, Valentiner was stationed by 2. U-Halbflottille/U-Flottille Pola at the Austrian base of Cattaro, in Montenegro. All German U-boat activities in the eastern Mediterranean Sea took place from here. Until the end of March 1915, U-38 had several problems with its diesel engine, and repairs were required. Training of the new crew took place between repairs near the British east coast, which was considered the safest area for training.

After March, U-38 started to patrol in the eastern Mediterranean Sea and on 30 December 1915, U-38 and Valentiner sank the British passenger ship Persia without any warning. Of the 519 aboard, 343 perished. The action was highly controversial since it broke naval international law and the Rules of Prize Warfare. The action took place under Germany’s policy of unrestricted submarine warfare, but broke the Imperial German Navy’s own restriction on attacking passenger liners, the Arabic pledge. After the attack, Valentiner was placed on the Allies list of war criminals. At home, he was awarded with the Knight's Cross with Swords of the Royal House Order of Hohenzollern on 14 May 1916.

In a so-called battle of Funchal On 3 December 1916 Valentiner took U-38 into the Funchal harbor on Madeira and sank three enemy ships. For this accomplishment, he became the sixth U-boat commander awarded the Pour le Mérite, on December 26.

On 15 September 1917 Valentiner left U-38 and Cattaro and returned to Kiel to take command of the new U-157. Kapitänleutnant Rabe von Pappenhein was to have taken this command, but for unknown reasons, this was changed. With U-157, Valentiner undertook the longest cruise of the war, from 27 November 1917 to 15 April 1918, a total of 139 days. This cruise came to be his last. In total, he sank 150 ships with a tonnage of about 300,000 tons.

Valentiner returned to the U-boat school to teach new submariners his techniques. His experience and advice were taken into account in the construction of the new boat U-143, which was faster and had a much improved dive time, but it was never finished.

== Interbellum ==
Valentiner was accused of "cruel and inhuman treatment of crews" in fifteen different incidents involving French, British, and Italian ships. The Allies demanded all war criminals be extradited, but most simply resigned quietly and disappeared for a while, including Valentiner.

He went first to Berlin, was removed from the list of naval officers, and acquired a new passport under the name Carl Schmidt. Valentiner then traveled to East Prussia and lived at Kadinen, an estate that his father managed, where he waited for the extraditions to proceed. He eventually became impatient and returned to Kiel. The peace negotiations were eventually completed, and per the Treaty of Versailles, all U-boats were dismantled. On his promotion to Korvettenkapitän, Valentiner was relieved of duty.

The German Navy had argued that the Royal Navy's use of Q-ships and false flag attacks had changed the nature of the war, making it impossible for German submarines to surface and give a targeted ship the chance to surrender.

== World War II ==
In January 1940, Valentiner was appointed group commander for U-Boots-Abnahmekommission (UAK) in Kiel-Danzig, a position he held until March 1945. Meanwhile, on 1 January 1941, he was promoted to Kapitän zur See. On 31 March 1945 he was discharged from the Kriegsmarine.

== Last years ==
On 19 June 1949 Valentiner died in Sønderborg hospital from lung disease, likely precipitated by the inhalation of toxic vapors from the engines in his first U-boats, U-10 and U-3.
