= SS Kanguroo =

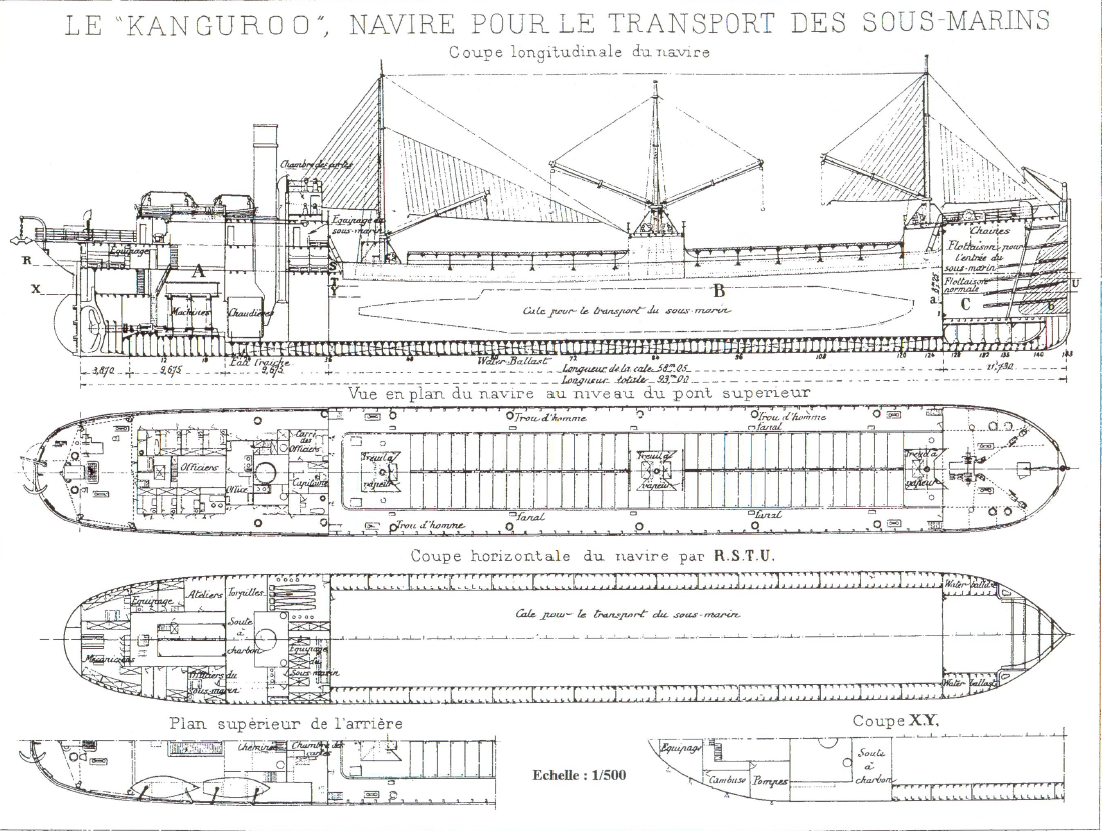
- Plan and elevation drawings of Kanguroo

History

France
- Name: Kanguroo
- Namesake: Kangaroo
- Owner: Schneider et Cie
- Builder: Forges et Chantiers de la Gironde, Bordeaux
- Launched: 12 April 1912
- Maiden voyage: 1912
- Fate: Requisitioned by the French Navy, 1914

France
- Acquired: Requisitioned, 1914
- Fate: Sunk, 3 December 1916

General characteristics
- Type: Heavy-lift ship
- Tonnage: 2,493 GRT
- Displacement: 5,630 t (5,540 long tons)
- Length: 93 m (305 ft 1 in)
- Beam: 12 m (39 ft 4 in)
- Draft: 5.95 m (19 ft 6 in)
- Installed power: 850 PS (630 kW)
- Propulsion: 1 Shaft; 1 Triple-expansion steam engine
- Speed: 10 knots (19 km/h; 12 mph)
- Capacity: 3,830 t (3,770 long tons)
- Crew: 22

SS Kanguroo was a French heavy-lift ship built to transport submarines before World War I. She delivered submarines to Brazil and Peru before the war began. Requisitioned in 1914 by the French Navy, she was torpedoed by a German submarine and sunk at Funchal, Madeira, during the Battle of Funchal on 3 December 1916.

== Background and description ==
Kanguroo was a ship built to transport submarines for the shipbuilder Schneider et Cie. The company's submarines were too small and their endurance too limited to cross the oceans on their own. Schneider deemed towing them too risky so the company commissioned a purpose-built ship to deliver them safely to their destination. She was 93 meters (305 ft 1 in) long with a beam of 12 meters (39 ft 4 in) and a draft of 5.95 meters (19 ft 6 in). The 2,493-gross register ton (GRT) ship displaced 5,630 metric tons (5,540 long tons) and could carry out-sized cargo up to 3,830 metric tons (3,770 long tons) in weight. Kanguroo was powered by a 850-metric-horsepower (630 kW) triple-expansion steam engine driving a single shaft that gave her a speed of 10 knots (19 km/h; 12 mph). She had a crew of four officers and eighteen enlisted crewmen.

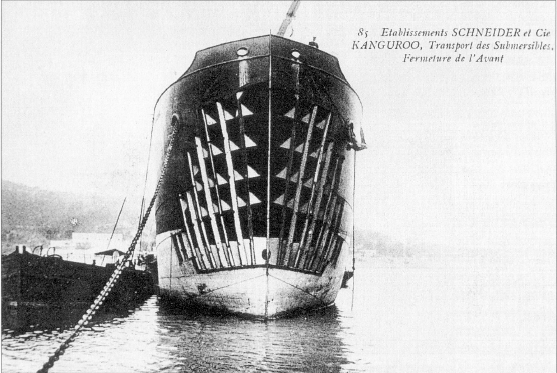
Bow of Kanguroo with the plating removed

The ship was essentially a self-propelled floating dry dock with three main sections. The stern contained the engine, bridge, crew accommodations, workshops, pumps, electric generators and storage facilities for the submarine's torpedoes. The submarine's batteries were kept charged during the voyage by the current from the generators. The middle section consisted of a 58-meter (190 ft 3 in) double-hulled well deck with ballast tanks between its inner walls and the outer hull. The well deck had a capacity of 3,300 cubic meters (120,000 cu ft) and was closed off by a pair of water-tight doors at its forward end. The outer plating and structural members of Kanguroo's bow were designed to be partially dismantled to give access to the short tunnel through the bow to the well deck. Additional ballast tanks were positioned below and on each side of the tunnel to raise and lower the bow.

Loading a submarine was a lengthy process that took weeks. The first step was to pump the forward ballast tanks empty which elevated the bow out of the water. Once it was dismantled, the ballast tanks were then filled to lower the bow and flood the well deck to allow the submarine to be winched aboard. The well deck's water-tight doors were then closed and the water in the dock was pumped overboard while the submarine settled onto its wooden bilge blocks. The bow was then reassembled and hatch covers were installed over the well deck. These prevented the ship from taking on water during a storm and allowed the crew to perform any necessary maintenance on the submarine while under way.

== Construction and service ==
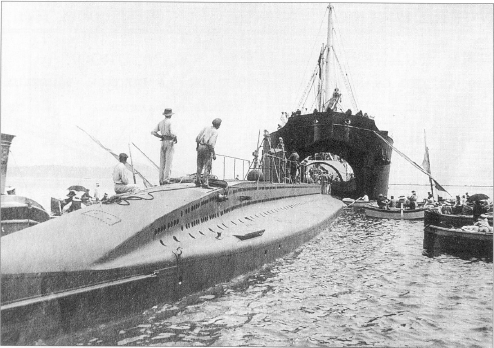
The Peruvian submarine Ferre being loaded aboard Kanguroo

Kanguroo was launched by Forges et Chantiers de la Gironde on 12 April 1912 at their shipyard in Bordeaux. She loaded the Peruvian submarine Ferre on 28 June at Saint-Mandrier-sur-Mer, but did not depart for Callao until 30 July. She arrived in Peru on 19 October, after stops in São Vicente, Cape Verde, Buenos Aires, and Montevideo, but could not unload the submarine until 29 October. The ship delivered Ferre's sister ship Palacios in 1913 and the Brazilian submarine F1 the following year.

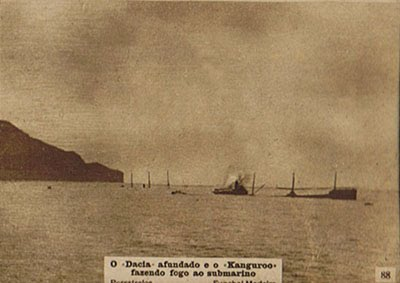
Kanguroo (foreground) sinking, 3 December 1916

After the start of World War I in August 1914, the French Navy requisitioned the Kanguroo. She was torpedoed and sank at the Port of Funchal, Madeira on 3 December 1916, together with the French gunboat Surprise and the elderly British 1,856-gross register ton (GRT) cable layer SS Dacia, by the German submarine U-38. A total of thirty-three foreign crewmen and eight Portuguese nationals died during the attack. A monument with a sculpture by Francisco Franco de Sousa was raised in 1917 to commemorate the incident.

== Bibliography ==
- Couhat, Jean Labayle (1974). French Warships of World War I. London: Ian Allan. ISBN 0-7110-0445-5.
- Croce, Alain; et al. (2009). "Question 30/45: Identity of Submarine Docking Ship". Warship International. XLVI (3). Toledo, Ohio: International Naval Records Organization: 199–202. ISSN 0043-0374.
- Garier, Gérard (1998). L'odyssée technique et humaine du sous-marin en France. Vol. Tome 2: Des Emeraude (1905–1906) au Charles Brun (1908–1933). Nantes, France: Marines édition. ISBN 2-909675-34-3.
