= Monte Railway =

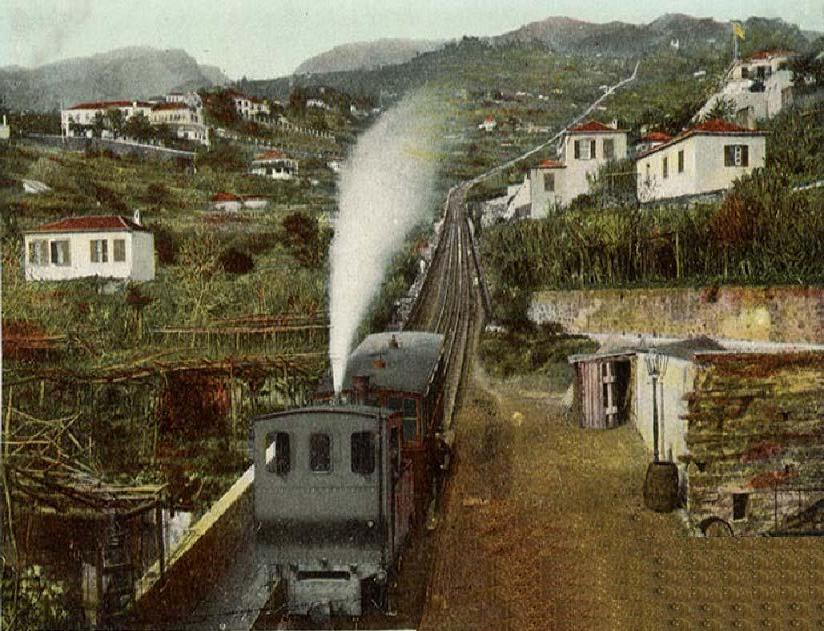
- Train pulling out of Pombal Station in Funchal

Overview
- Native name: Caminho de Ferro do Monte
- Locale: Portugal
- Termini: Funchal; Terreiro da Luta

History
- Opened: 16 July 1893
- Closed: April 1943

Technical
- Line length: 3.9 km (2.4 mi)
- Track gauge: meter gauge
- Highest elevation: 850 m (2,790 ft)

The Monte Railway (Portuguese: Caminho de Ferro do Monte) (commonly known as the Monte train or Monte Lift) was a rack railway connecting Pombal, in Funchal, to Terreiro da Luta in Monte (Madeira, Portugal), a distance of 3,911 metres. It was built in stages between 1893 and 1912 and ceased operation in April 1943.

The Funchal Cable Car was built in 2000 and does not follow the route of the Monte railway.

== History ==
=== Beginnings ===
In the late 1800s, the Monte area in Madeira was a destination for tourism and recuperation. For this reason it was called Madeira's Sintra. Monte was the parish where Funchal's wealthiest families had their country homes.

=== Project and construction ===
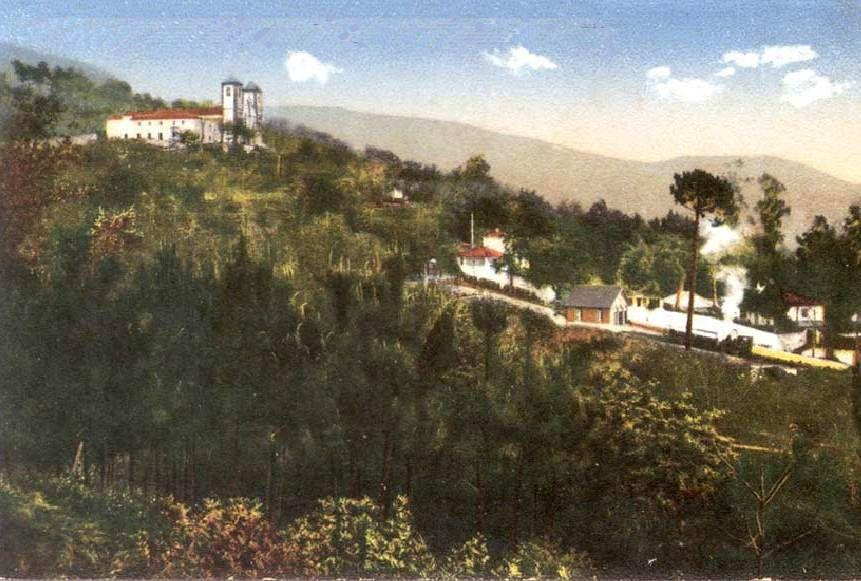
Monte Station

The railway was designed in 1886 by engineer Raoul Mesnier du Ponsard. The idea of building the railway came from António Joaquim Marques, who obtained permission from Funchal city council on 17 February 1887. A contract was signed with a concessionaire forming the Companhia do Caminho de Ferro do Monte. This document established that the municipality would be responsible for expropriating any land necessary for the construction of the railroad, although the costs would be covered by the company. The company would own the right-of-way for nine years, after which it would pass to public ownership. On 22 January 1891, the council approved the project for the railway.

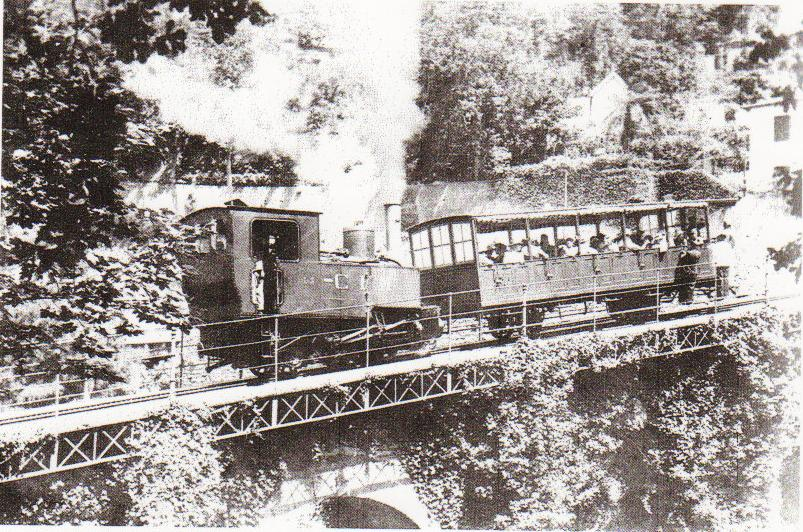
Locomotive and carriage near Largo da Fonte, Monte.

Work started on 13 August 1891 at Confeiteira, where it was necessary to build retaining walls. In 1893 the German-made rolling stock arrived via Belgium and service started on 16 July between Pombal and Levada de Santa Luzia, witnessed by the governor-general, the bishop, and other Madeira notables. The first train was a single car and engine. A few days later regular service started, with the first departure at 4 am. A trip normally took 5 minutes and cost 80 réis. There was also an ≪americano≫ (horsecar) run by the Caminhos de Ferro Americanos da Cidade do Funchal which took passengers from Funchal's pier to the railway terminus at Pombal.

By August 1894 the line was extended to Atalhinho, in the Monte parish, at 577 m above sea level. This part of the line required costly cut-work into the hillside to reduce the grade to operable levels even for a rack railway. A new German-built locomotive also joined the rolling stock at this time.

The trade journal Gazeta dos Caminhos de Ferro noted in their 16 September 1903 issue that some locomotives were in bad repair, for which reason the local government ordered the company to take all means necessary to guarantee the safety of the public. At this point the company had three locomotives, one new and two previously repaired. It was debated whether to form a new association to acquire Caminho de Ferro do Monte but no action was taken.

In their general assembly on 12 July 1910, the Companhia do Caminho de Ferro do Monte decided to extend the line further to Terreiro da Luta. The Funchal City Council approved this on 4 August. During construction, the company suffered financial difficulties, twice needing new financing and not providing dividends to investors. The interest of the British merchants who were initially keen on the project began to flag.

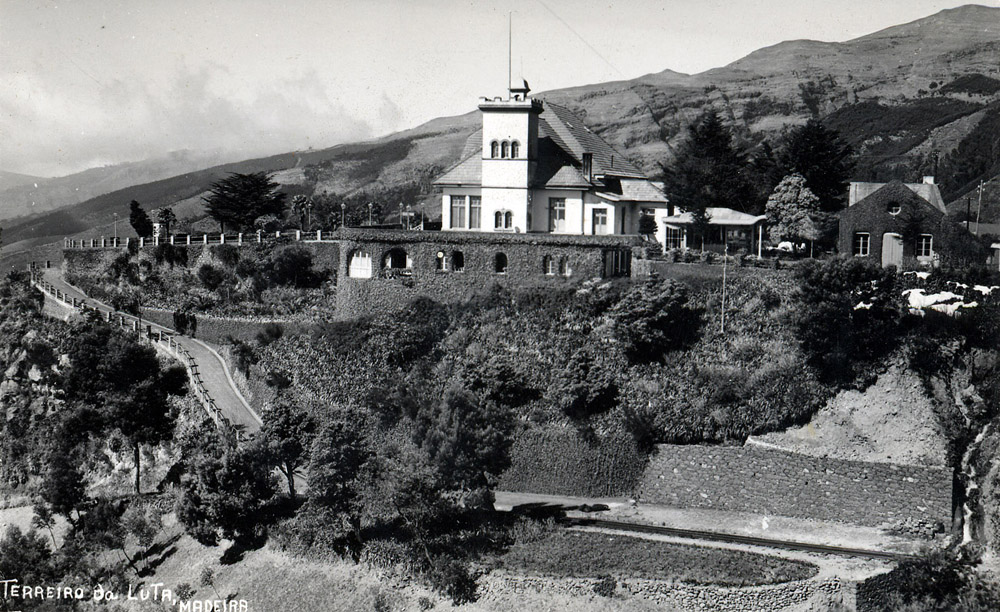
Station and restaurant at Terreiro da Luta.

The first train arrived at Terreiro da Luta, 850 m above sea level, on 24 July 1912, making the line's total extent 3,911 m. At the summit station, the company opened a 400-seat panoramic restaurant, whose food quality was, reportedly, competitive internationally.

=== Construction phases ===
Stage	Extent	Inaugural service
Pombal - Levada de Santa Luzia	1000 m	16 July 1893
Levada de Santa Luzia - Atalhinho (Monte)	1500 m	5 August 1894
Atalhinho (Monte) - Terreiro da Luta	1411 m	24 July 1912

=== Decline ===
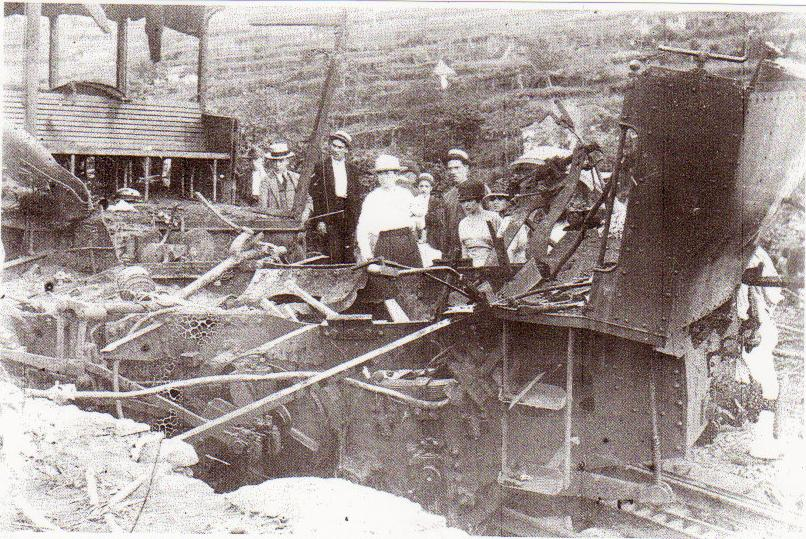
Train after the boiler exploded on 10 September 1919.

Despite improvement in the financial situation of Caminho de Ferro do Monte, it was unable to raise enough capital to replace its rolling stock, which was showing serious signs of wear. The situation worsened until an accident occurred on 10 September 1919, when a locomotive boiler exploded on the ascent to Monte. There were four deaths and many injuries among the 56 passengers on board. On account of the accident, operations were suspended until 1 February 1920, pending the outcome of an investigation. The investigators concluded the cause was faulty manufacture of the boiler. The railway consequently ordered a new locomotive from a different manufacturer. On 11 January 1932, another disaster occurred, this time a derailment. Consequently, both tourists and residents shunned the service, judging it too dangerous. Furthermore, the Second World War led to a decrease in tourism to Madeira and the company fell into crisis. Another contributing factor to the diminishing railway custom was road building that developed road transport alternatives.

Due to financial adversity and the bad state of the rolling stock, it was not possible to maintain railway operations. Hence, the last train trip was in April 1943, the line dismantled, and the hardware sold for scrap. The financial failure left many residents with no means of transport.

The 16 November 1948 issue of Gazeta dos Caminhos de Ferro reported the sale of the Caminho de Ferro do Monte. Its physical assets were sold at ridiculously low prices, according to the source, and the real estate was abandoned. The rolling stock was eventually used to repair the Bom Jesus Funicular in Braga.

== Features ==
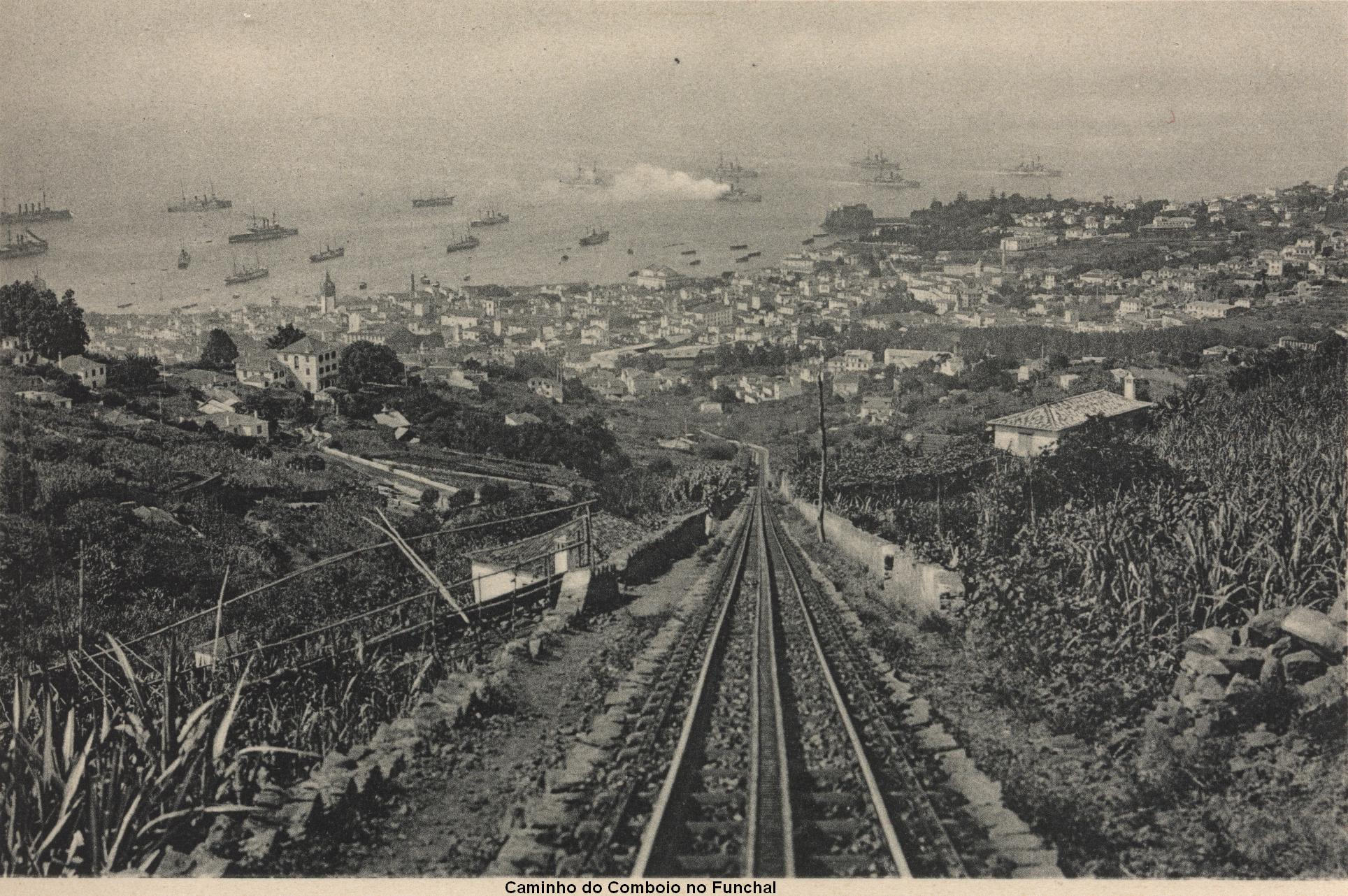
Funchal viewed from the railway, in which the rack may be seen between the rails.

=== Technical characteristics ===
The Monte Railway was a Riggenbach-type system. It was a single-track, meter-gauge line except for passing loops at the stations Livramento and Monte. Consists were of a single car always on the uphill side of the locomotive. Gravity pressing the car against the engine eliminated the need for couplings to it.

=== Rolling stock ===
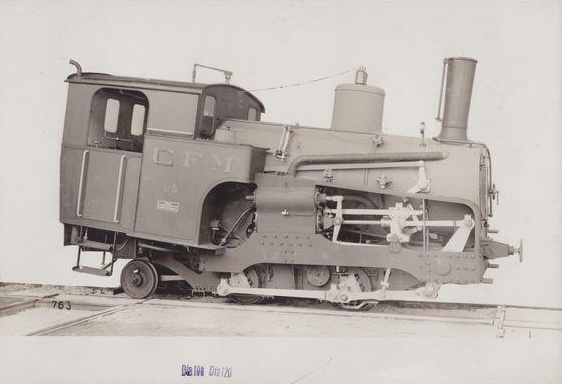
Monte Railway Locomotives Builder's photo of SLM H 2/3 locomotive built for Caminho de Ferro do Monte
Year	Road Number	Builder	Build Number
1893	L-1	ME	2568
1894	L-2	ME	2654
1903	L-3	ME	3254
1912	L-4	ME	3668
1925	L-5	SLM	3122

The company had five locomotives, four built by Maschinenfabrik Esslingen (ME) and one by SLM Winterthur (SLM). There were five passenger cars, each holding around 60 passengers, divided into five compartments. There was also a flat car for baggage transport.

== Present state ==
In October of 2003, the Funchal city government announced a public tender for the reconstruction of the Monte Railway — a "heritage asset" according to it. The requirements, which conveyed the right to operate it for 50 years, prescribed a funicular line between Largo do Monte and Terreiro da Luta and a connection to a "tourist railway" from there to Largo das Babosas (near the summit station of the Funchal Cable Car). Buildings were to be made with historic materials.

A joint project emerged from the tender involving the Funchal city government and the company Teleféricos da Madeira. The project involves building a funicular between the former stations of Terreiro da Luta and Monte along the old railway alignment.

In 2020, the Funchal city government acquired the old station at Monte for renovation and conversion into an historical and cultural information center.
