= Ketting =

Ketting is a surname. Notable persons with the surname include:

- Jeroen Ketting (born 1980), English footballer
- Rick Ketting (born 1996), Dutch footballer
