= Robert Machin =

English sailor and adventurer

Robert Machin or Machim (fl. 14th century) was an English adventurer of uncertain historicity, who supposedly discovered the island of Madeira. Various traditions give conflicting versions of Machin's story.

In the best-known version the protagonist is a knight, referred to as the Machim. He was an English aristocrat who traded on the Mediterranean and fell in love with a woman by the name of Anne d'Arfet. Her original name could have been Dorset, Darbey or Hertford; it is no longer clear since the story was transmitted through foreign languages. Anne was of a higher social standing than Robert, and both had to elope from the town of Bristol. Their ship was driven away from the coast of France by a storm, and after 130 days, they saw the island of Madeira, where they landed.

At that point, however, Anne died from exhaustion, and Robert followed her a few days later. The crew of the ship make it to North Africa, where they are captured by the Moors. One of their fellow prisoners, called Morales of Seville, was ransomed and sent back to Castile, but on the way back, he was captured by a servant of Prince Henry the Navigator of Portugal. When Prince Henry heard of the story, he promptly sent out an expedition, which finds the island of Madeira.

This version of the story was supposedly written down by a member of Prince Henry's household and became the basis for several later versions. It is known to date back at least to 1579. Another tradition is probably older, and can be traced back to 1507. In this version, Machin survived his lover and built an oratory over her grave. He made it off the island and eventually ends up at the royal court of Castile. Finally, a third version tells of a French merchant by the name of il Macino, known from the writings of Giulio Landi. He differed from the other two in two senses: he had no mistress, and he later returned to colonise the island.

Though it is unknown whether the story of Machin is true, the island still carries a reminder of him in the name of the city Machico, which supposedly was named after him. It is certain that the discovery of Madeira predates the Portuguese settlement, as it appears on maps as early as 1339. In 1419, João Gonçalves Zarco landed on the island and colonised it for Portugal.
