= Raid on Lowca and Parton =

Attack by the Imperial German Navy submarine on 16 August 1915

- Part of Naval warfare of World War I
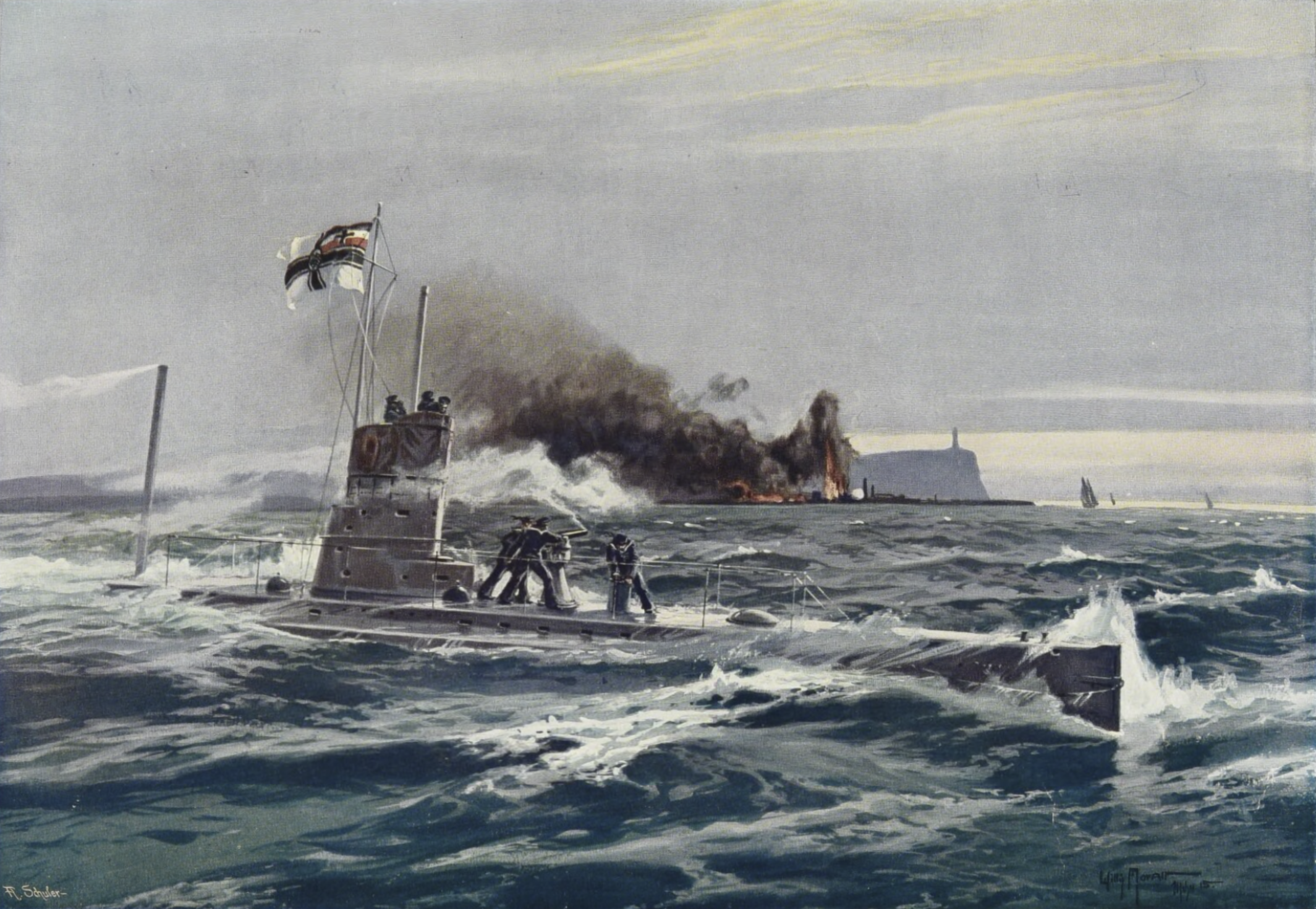
- German U-24 submarine attacking Harrington Coke factory near Whitehaven (illustration by Willy Moralt)
Date	16 August 1915
Location	near Lowca and Parton villages, Cumbrian coast, England 54°34′58″N 3°34′58″W
Result	Indecisive

Belligerents
Germany	United Kingdom

Commanders and leaders
Rudolf Schneider	None

Strength
U-24	

Casualties and losses
None	1 dog killed

The Raid on Lowca and Parton during the First World War on 16 August 1915 was an attack by the Imperial German Navy submarine U-24 on the Harrington Coke toluene factory located near the villages of Lowca and Parton in Cumbria on the British coast. U-24 fired 55 shells and then left without British interference, causing minimal damage to the facility and the death of a local dog. The incident was one of only a few naval operations in the Irish Sea during World War One, and probably the first time Britain was bombarded by a submarine.

The event played a significant part in the espionage affair of Hildegare Burnyeat, the German-born wife of British Parliament MP William Burnyeat, who was accused, convicted, and finally pardoned on charges of spying for the German Empire.

== Background ==
In response to the continuing British naval blockade of Germany, the German government declared the waters around the British Isles a war zone on 4 February 1915. German U-boat type submarines soon began penetrating close to the British coast, attacking mainly cargo ships and sinking them without warning. On 20 February the Welsh steamer Cambank and the Irish steamer Downshire were sunk in the Irish Sea (by SM U-30), with more soon following. Operational capabilities of the U-boats created a new threat to the western coast of Britain, which until then had been almost untouched by direct military action, unlike England's south-eastern shores, which experienced the first massive coastal bombardment, primarily targeting non-military sites, on 16 December 1914 during the raid on Scarborough, Hartlepool and Whitby. This attack, following two other similar German operations in the summer of 1915, resulted in 136 people killed and 443 wounded, and had a strong psychological impact on the British public.

== Action ==
For the German Imperial Navy, targeting strategic and military facilities on Britain's coast represented a chance to use new tactics on a newly opened war front; it gave German submariners the opportunity to prove an original plan. U-boat U-24, under the command of Capitain Rudolf Schneider, was tasked with attacking the Harrington Coke factory, a major producer of toluen (a benzene derivative used in the production of TNT), with fire from its deck gun. Owned by the Workington Iron and Steel Company, the factory had been built in 1911 in collaboration with German companies, ready access to detailed maps and schematics presumably being one reason why Harrington Coke was targeted. The area was also expected to be unguarded by British ships or coastal artillery.

In the middle of August 1915 U-24 slipped into the Irish Sea. At dawn on 16 August the boat intercepted the Cumbrian coast and surfaced. At about 4:50 crew members came on deck and opened fire 8.8 cm SK L/30 naval gun on the Harrington Coke factory near Lowca village. 55 shots had been fired, about 13 of them hit the targeted site. Later the information spread that a quick thinking workers of the plant opened a relief valve which sent up an impressive plume of burning gas simulating an explosion fire, so the submariners thought they had damaged their target enough. About 20 shots were then fired on an inhabited coast side of Lowca and Parton villages. U-24 was spotted at sea by two men in an unarmed fishing boat watching. Action lasted for about 25 minutes, then U-24 left the coast to continue in hunt for enemy vessels.

== Aftermath ==
Shelling caused a few fires and damage of the cost about £800. Nobody was killed during the accident, most of the people were already sleeping and apparently the only fatality of the incident was one of the local dogs. After just four days functioning of the factory was restored.

The action of U-24 was widely used by German war propaganda picturing the surprising and courageous attack "behind enemy lines", British press on the other hand called the German submariners pirates and Huns. Nevertheless, the operation was still shadowed by the sinking of British steamer SS Arabic in the Irish Sea on 19 August 1915, causing 44 casualties.

== Espionage affair ==
Numerous witnesses from the area reported, that they had seen pure white light coming from the coast presumably giving the signal to the German boat. Suspicion felt on Mrs Hildegarde Burnyeat, wife of a local coal industry entrepreneur and former member of the British Parliament William Burnyeat. She was born in 1875 as Hildegard Hedwig Augusta Anna Retzlaff in Culm, Eastern Prussia, later lived in Berlin and then moved to Britain after marrying her husband in 1908, living in a house near Whitehaven port.

Possible relation between Mrs Burnyeat origin, place of residence and the U-boat attack were put together by the British intelligence which led to her arrest and charge of an espionage for the German Empire. In an atmosphere of the executions of a British nurse Edith Cavell in German-occupied Belgium for being a British spy and some similar cases which occurred in Britain, the affair was followed by the British press in a large scale. At first Hildegarde Burnyeat was sentenced to death penalty, soon after changed for life imprisonment. Her case was later reviewed and after a year, shortly after her husband William died on 8 May 1916 aged 42, she was set free of all charges and released. Suspicion could be based on truth: she was a daughter of a Prussian officer, her brother served in the German navy and after the war started she was defending German positions for war.

== Memory ==
Some of the relicts of the shells and other artifacts and materials about the raid are kept in the Beacon Museum in nearby town of Whitehaven.

== See also ==
- SM U-24
- Lowca
