= SM U-157 =

German submarine during World War I

History

German Empire
- Name: U-157
- Ordered: 29 November 1916
- Builder: H. C. Stülcken Sohn, Hamburg
- Launched: 23 May 1917
- Commissioned: 22 September 1917
- Fate: 11 November 1918 – Interned at Trondheim, Norway. Surrendered to France on 8 February 1919. Broken up at Brest during July 1921.

General characteristics
- Class & type: Type U 151 submarine
- Displacement: 1,512 tonnes (1,488 long tons) (surfaced); 1,875 tonnes (1,845 long tons) (submerged); 2,272 tonnes (2,236 long tons) (total)
- Length: 65.00 m (213 ft 3 in) (o/a); 57.00 m (187 ft) (pressure hull)
- Beam: 8.90 m (29 ft 2 in) (o/a); 5.80 m (19 ft) (pressure hull)
- Height: 9.25 m (30 ft 4 in)
- Draught: 5.30 m (17 ft 5 in)
- Installed power: 800 PS (590 kW; 790 bhp) (surfaced); 800 PS (590 kW; 790 bhp) (submerged)
- Propulsion: 2 × shafts, 2 × 1.60 m (5 ft 3 in) propellers
- Speed: 12.4 knots (23.0 km/h; 14.3 mph) surfaced; 5.2 knots (9.6 km/h; 6.0 mph) submerged
- Range: 25,000 nmi (46,000 km; 29,000 mi) at 5.5 knots (10.2 km/h; 6.3 mph) surfaced, 65 nmi (120 km; 75 mi) at 3 knots (5.6 km/h; 3.5 mph) submerged
- Test depth: 50 metres (160 ft)
- Complement: 6 officers, 50 enlisted
- Armament: 2 50 cm (20 in) bow torpedo tubes; 18 torpedoes; 2 × 15 cm (5.9 in) SK L/45 deck guns with 1672 rounds; 2 × 8.8 cm (3.5 in) SK L/30 deck guns with 764 rounds

Service record
- Part of: U-Kreuzer Flotilla; 22 September 1917 – 11 November 1918
- Commanders: Kptlt. Max Valentiner; 22 September 1917 – 20 July 1918; KrvKpt. Ortwin Rave; 21 July – 30 November 1918
- Operations: 2 patrols
- Victories: 15 merchant ships sunk (15,905 GRT)

SM U-157 (Note: "SM" stands for "Seiner Majestät" (English: His Majesty's) and combined with the U for Unterseeboot would be translated as His Majesty's Submarine.) was one of the 329 submarines serving in the Imperial German Navy in World War I. U-157 was engaged in the naval warfare and took part in the First Battle of the Atlantic.

== Summary of raiding history ==
Date	Name	Nationality	Tonnage (Note: Merchant ship tonnages are in gross register tons. Military vessels are listed by tons displacement.)	Fate
26 December 1917	Lidia	Portugal	302	Sunk
7 January 1918	Oued Sebou	France	1,540	Sunk
10 January 1918	Hulda Maersk	Denmark	1,566	Sunk
11 January 1918	Norefos	Norway	1,788	Sunk
17 February 1918	Estrella Da Bissao	Portugal	129	Sunk
20 February 1918	Kithira	Greece	2,240	Sunk
14 March 1918	Arpillao	Spain	2,768	Sunk
4 August 1918	Remonstrant	Norway	1,073	Sunk
4 August 1918	Don	Norway	1,145	Sunk
9 August 1918	Orkney	Denmark	291	Sunk
15 August 1918	Kalps	Russian SFSR	284	Sunk
27 August 1918	Gloria	Portugal	120	Sunk
18 September 1918	Ledaal	Norway	2,257	Sunk
22 September 1918	Gaia	Portugal	278	Sunk
8 October 1918	Hawanee	United Kingdom	124	Sunk

== Bibliography ==
- Gröner, Erich; Jung, Dieter; Maass, Martin (1991). U-boats and Mine Warfare Vessels. German Warships 1815–1945. Vol. 2. Translated by Thomas, Keith; Magowan, Rachel. London: Conway Maritime Press. ISBN 0-85177-593-4.
- Jung, Dieter (2004). Die Schiffe der Kaiserlichen Marine 1914-1918 und ihr Verbleib [German Imperial Navy ships 1914-1918 and their fate] (in German). Bonn: Bernard & Graefe. ISBN 3-7637-6247-7.
