= Port of Funchal =

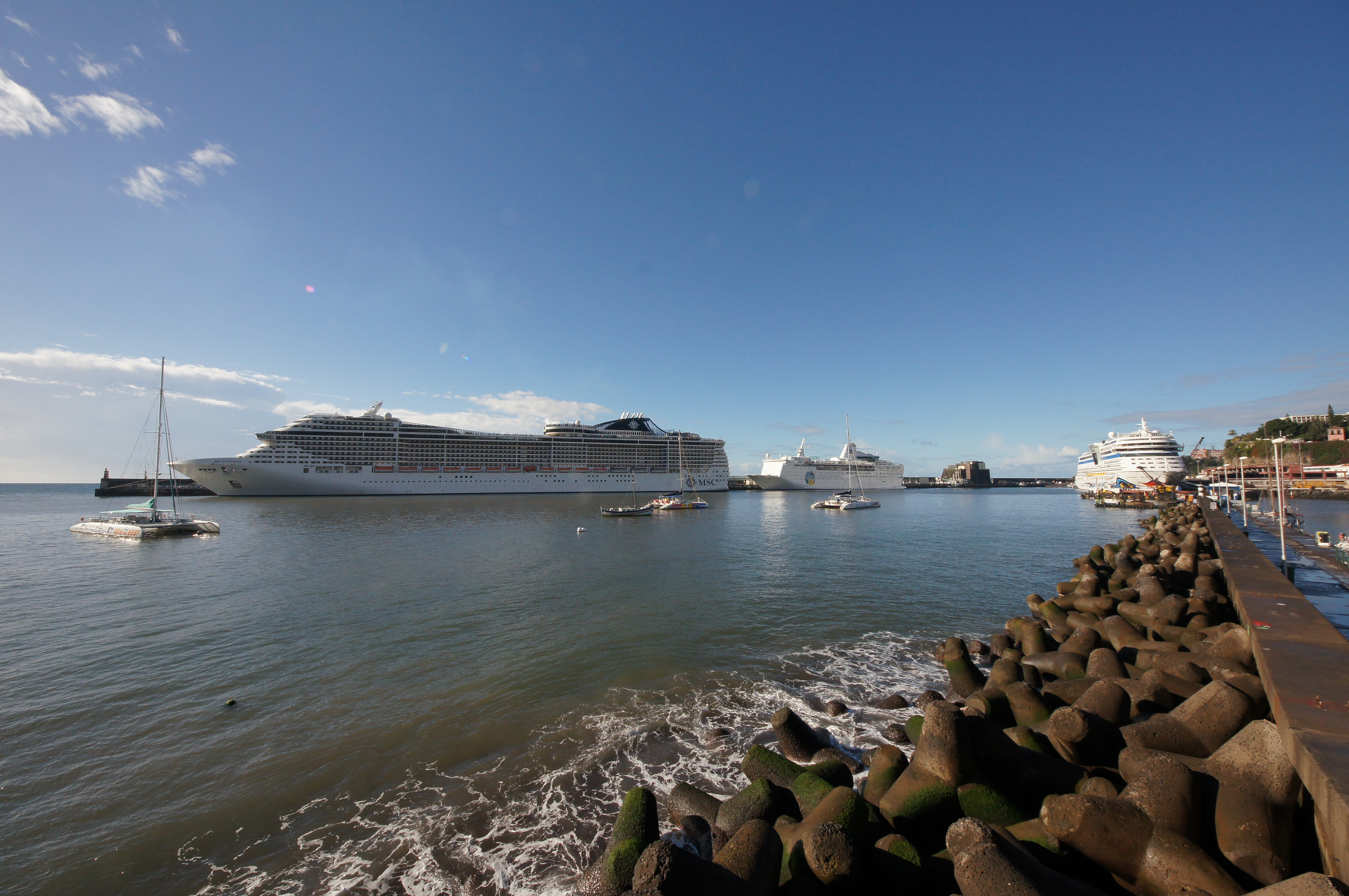
- Port of Funchal
- Click on the map for a fullscreen view

Location
- Country: Portugal
- Location: Funchal, Madeira
- Coordinates: 32°38′33.5″N 16°54′58.7″W
- UN/LOCODE: PTFNC

Details
- Opened: 1762

Statistics
- Website http://www.apram.pt/site/index.php/en/

The Port of Funchal is the port and harbour of Funchal and is frequently used as a stop-over by transatlantic ships, en route from Europe to the Caribbean, as it is the northernmost Atlantic island that lies in the path of the Westerlies.

== History ==
The Port of Funchal was the only major port in Madeira until 2007 when it became fully dedicated to passenger transport – cruise ships and ferries – and other tourist-related boats and yachts. In that year all remaining fishing activity and cargo trade was moved to the newly developed port of Caniçal, 12 mi (19 km) to the east.

A ferry service between Funchal and Portimão, on the mainland, provided by Naviera Armas sailed weekly from 2008, but was discontinued in 2013 due to a dispute over harbour fees. In the summer of 2018 it was re-instated, but as a seasonal service from July to September, being operated by Grupo Sousa using Naviera Armas's ship called Volcán de Tijarafe, that provided the crossing prior to the 2013 discontinuation, with a maximum speed of 23 knots the crossing takes around 24 hours.

A ferry called Lobo Marinho runs in two hours between Funchal and Porto Santo Island.

== Destinations ==
- Porto Santo by Lobo Marinho

== See also ==
- List of busiest ports in Europe
- List of world's busiest transshipment ports
