= Church of Our Lady of the Mount =

Roman Catholic church on the Portuguese island of Madeira

- Igreja de Nossa Senhora do Monte
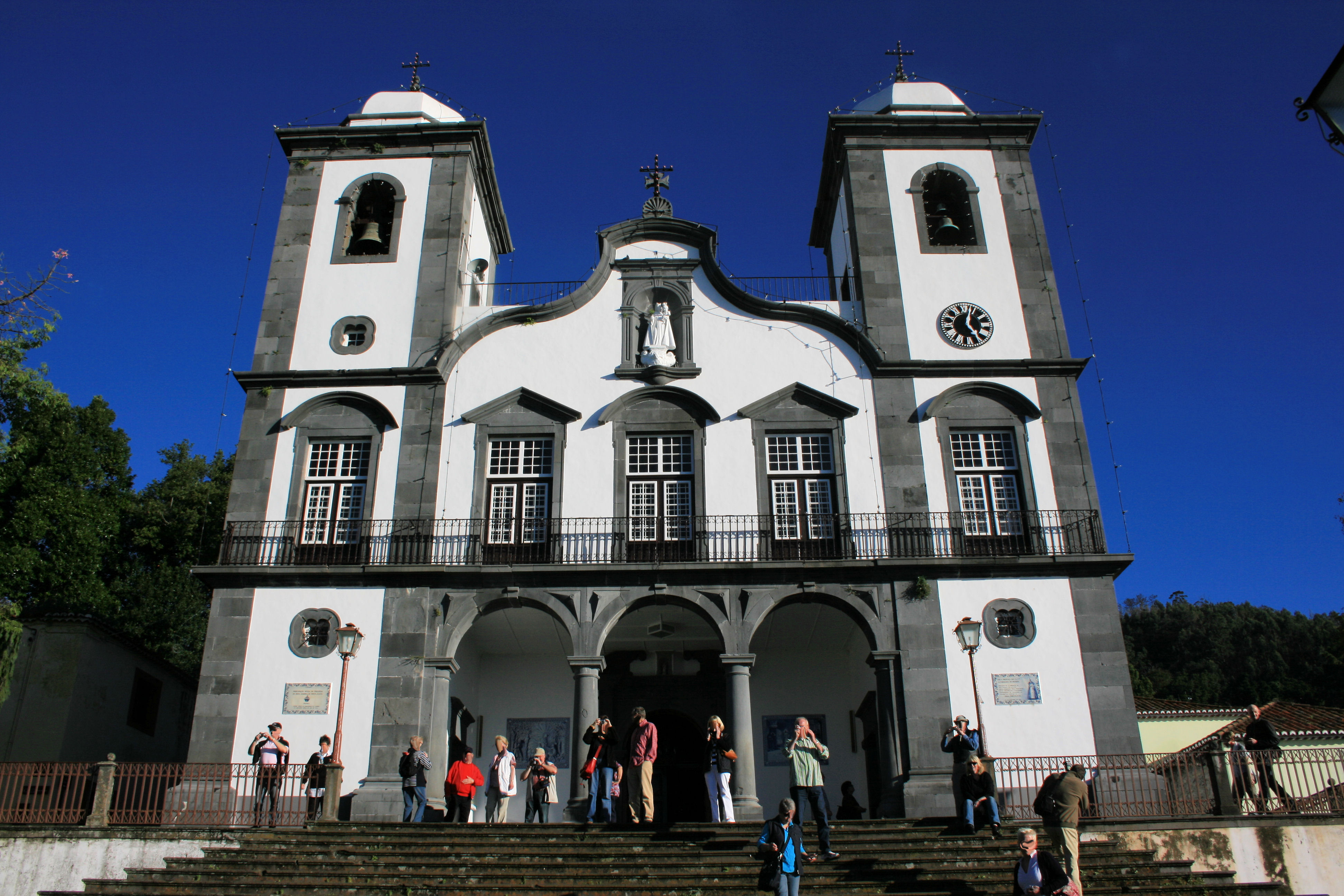
- Church of Our Lady of the Mount

- Location within Madeira

Religion
- Affiliation: Roman Catholic
- Year consecrated: December 20, 1818

Location
- Location: Monte, Madeira.
- Coordinates: 32°40′33.6″N 16°54′09.0″W

Architecture
- Groundbreaking: June 10, 1741
- Completed: 1748

Website
- www.facebook.com/paroquiansmonte/

The Church of Our Lady of the Mount (Portuguese: Igreja de Nossa Senhora do Monte) is the main church in the civil parish of Monte, in Funchal, Madeira island.

== History ==
Adão Gonçalves Ferreira, the first man born on Madeira island, dedicated the chapel to Our Lady of the Incarnation in 1470. Construction began on 10 June 1741. On 20 December 1818 the Church was consecrated by the Archbishop of Meliapor and administrator of the Diocese D. Frei Joaquim de Meneses e Ataíde.

Emperor Charles I of Austria died in exile on Madeira island and was laid to rest in the church.

== Festival ==
The Assumption of Mary was first held on 15 August 1551 and has been held annually since. Fires are made by locals and local food is made such as Espetada, Bolo do caco, and Bacalhau.

== Gallery ==
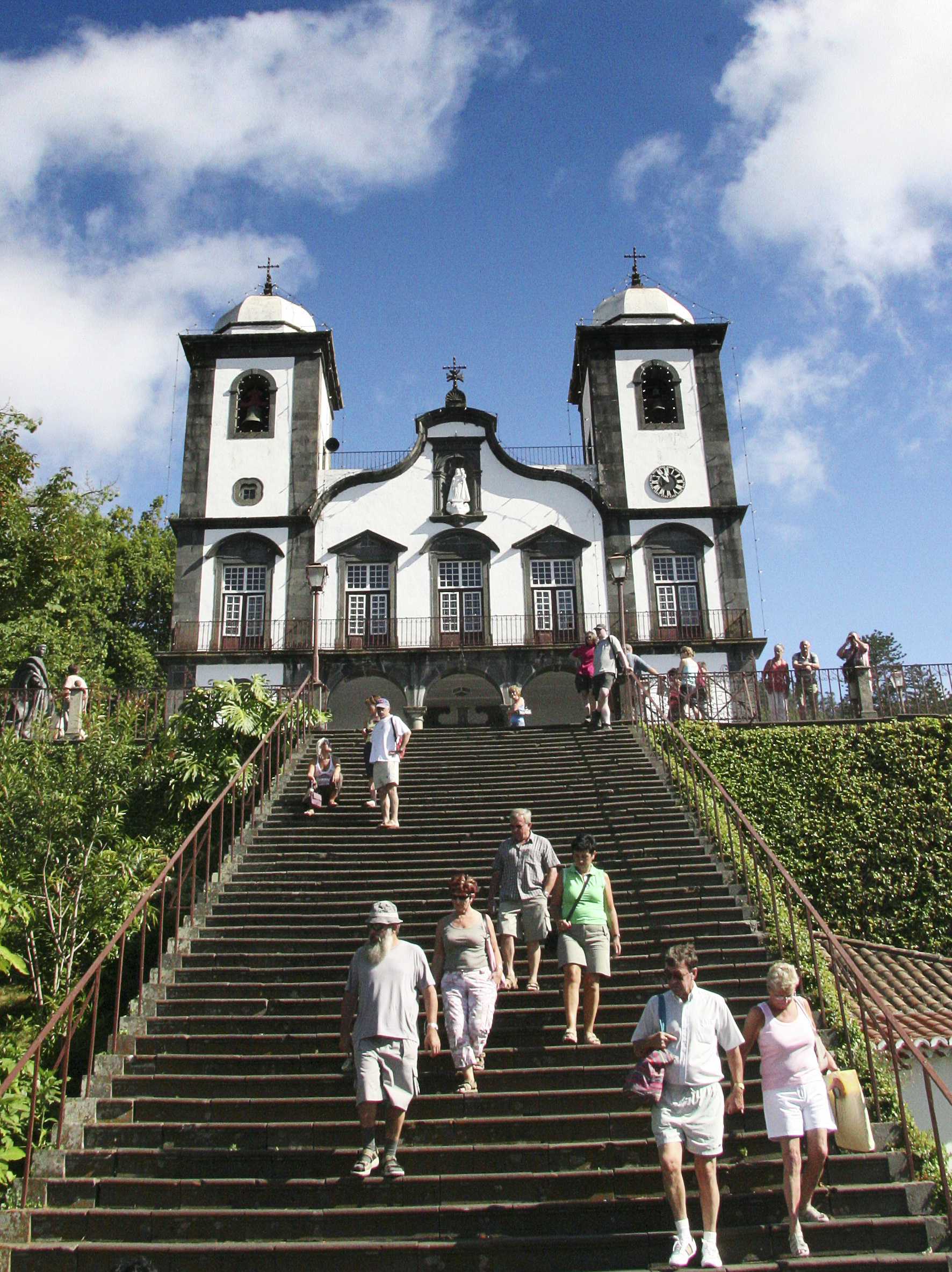

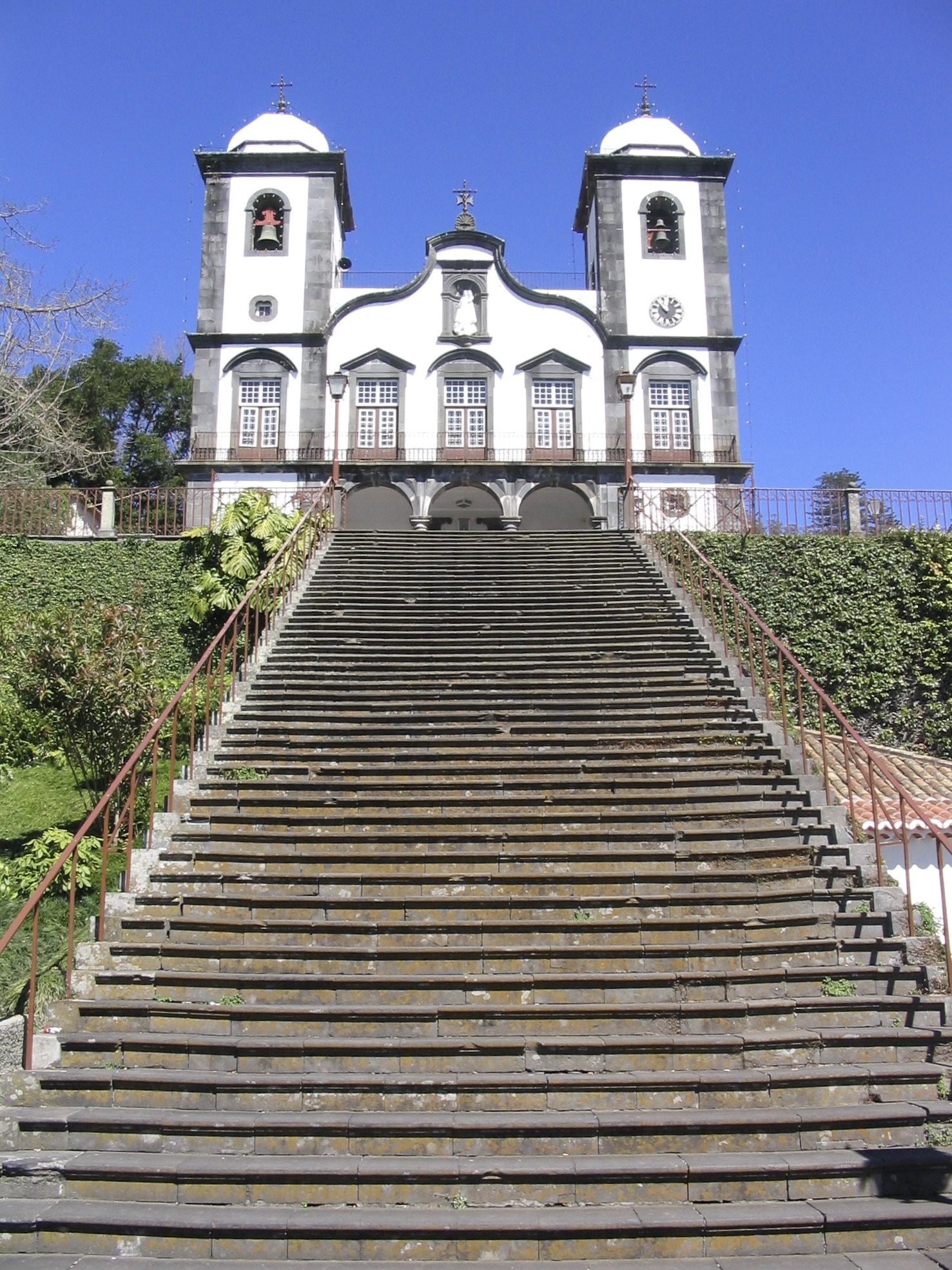

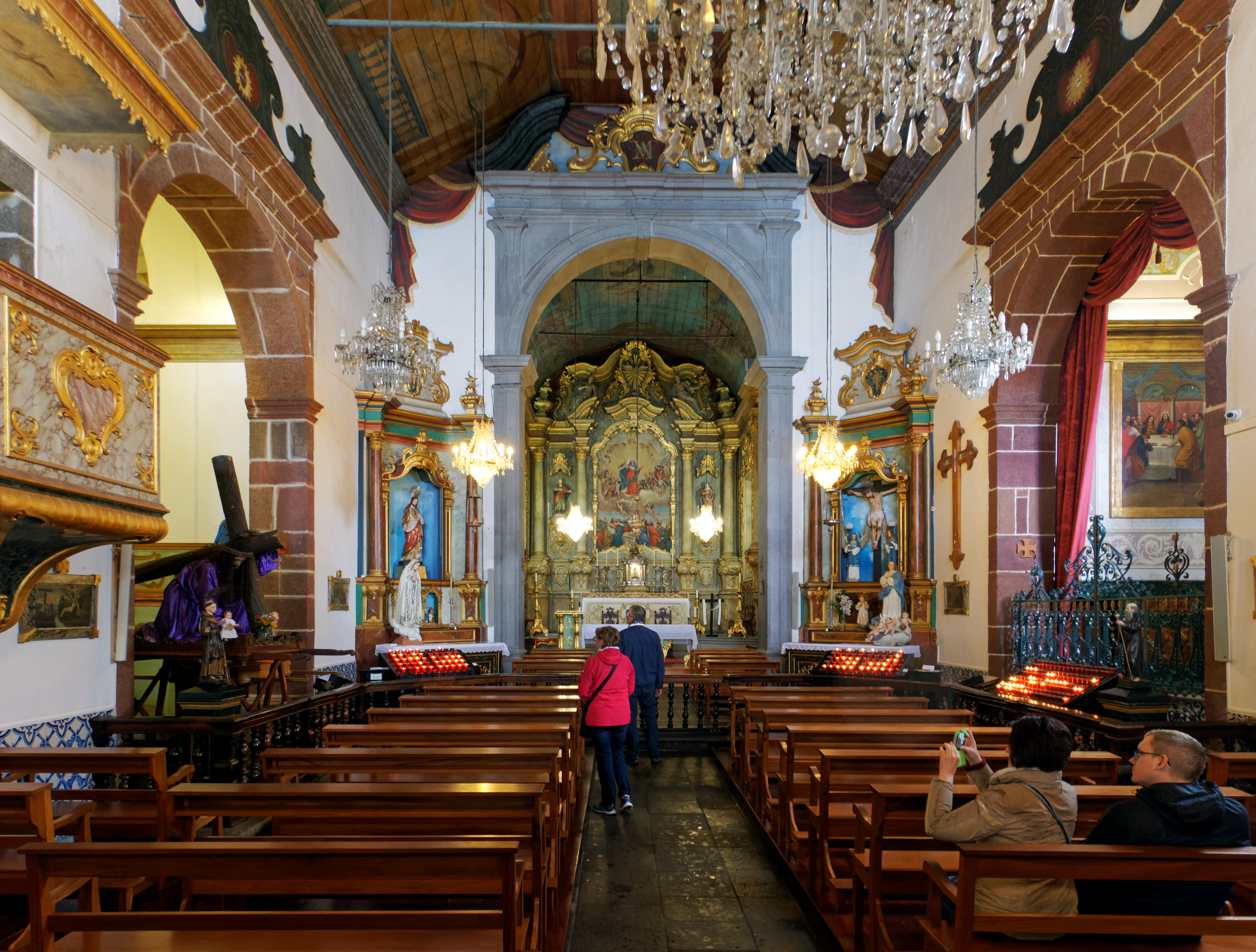

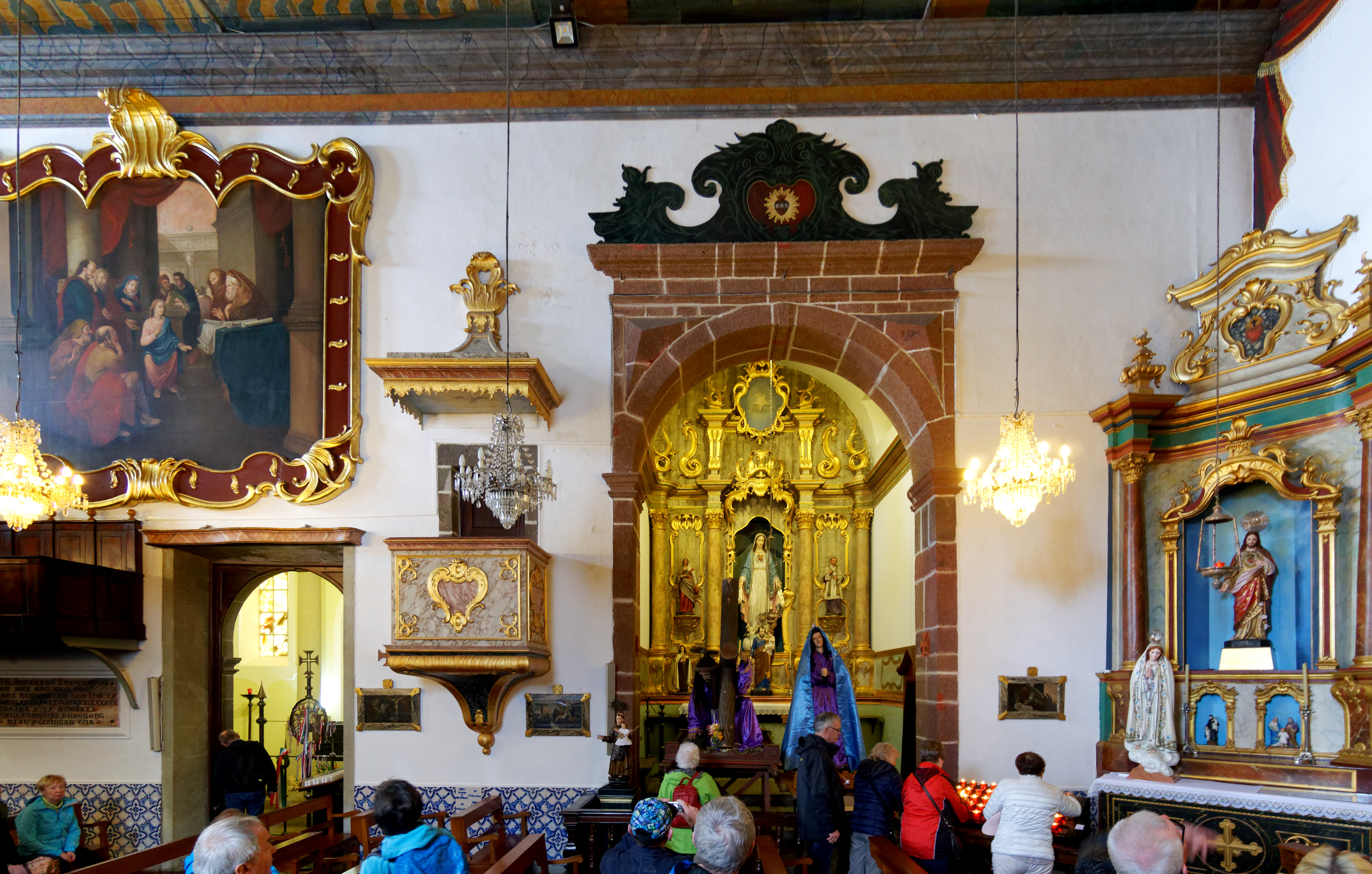

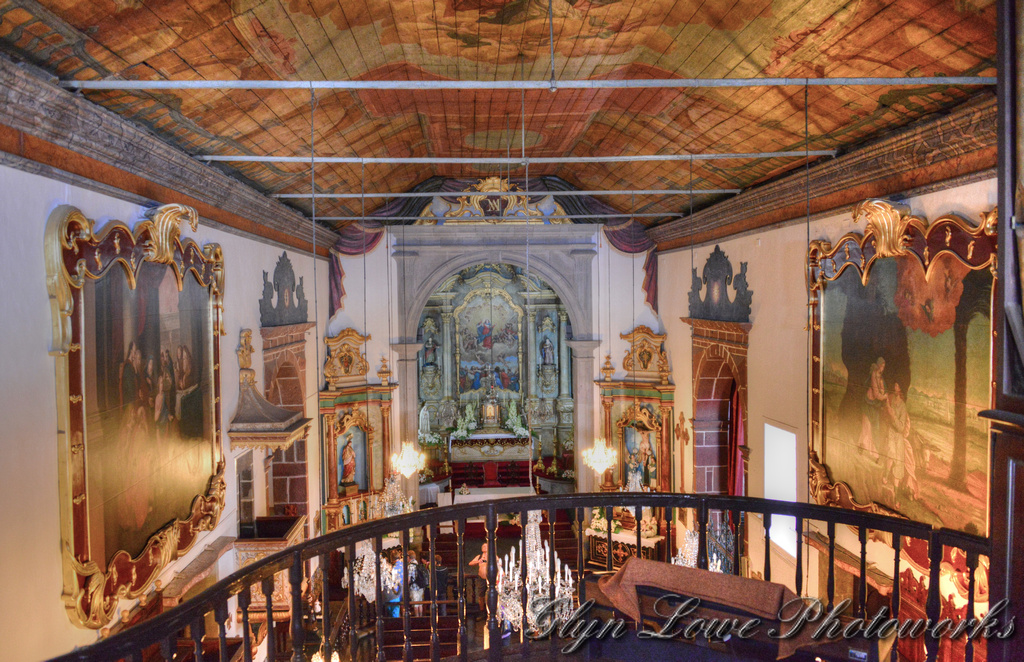

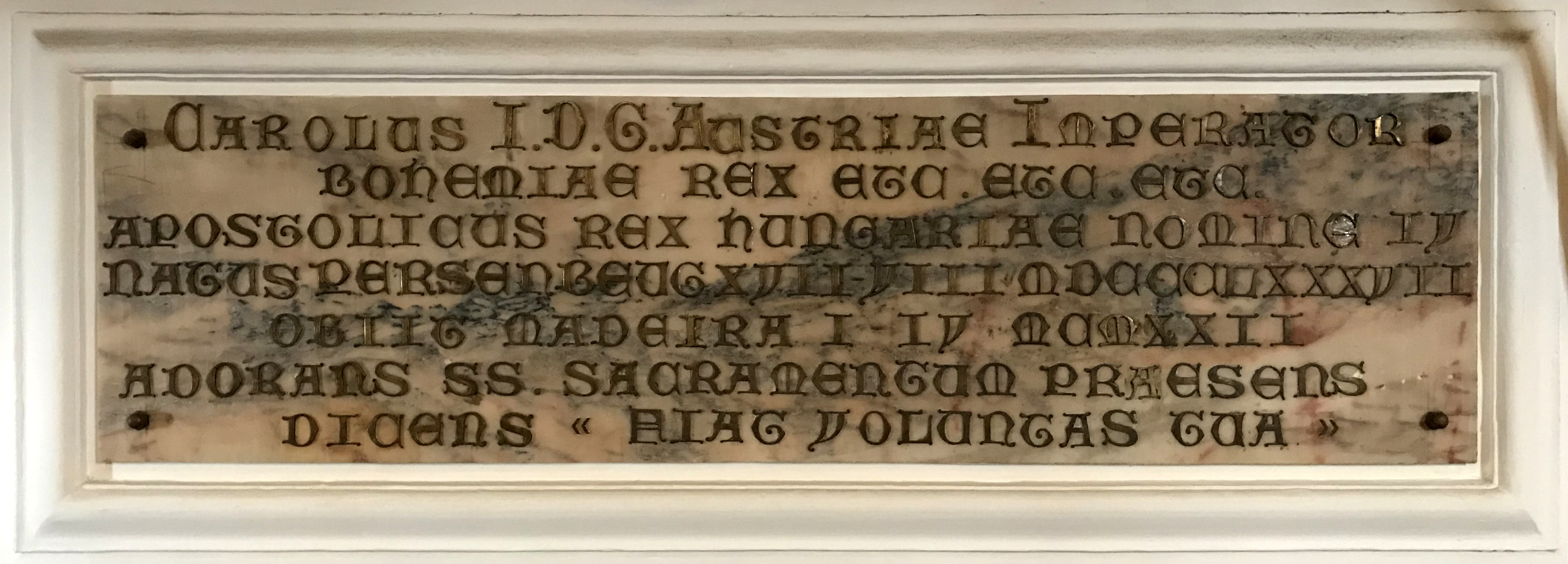

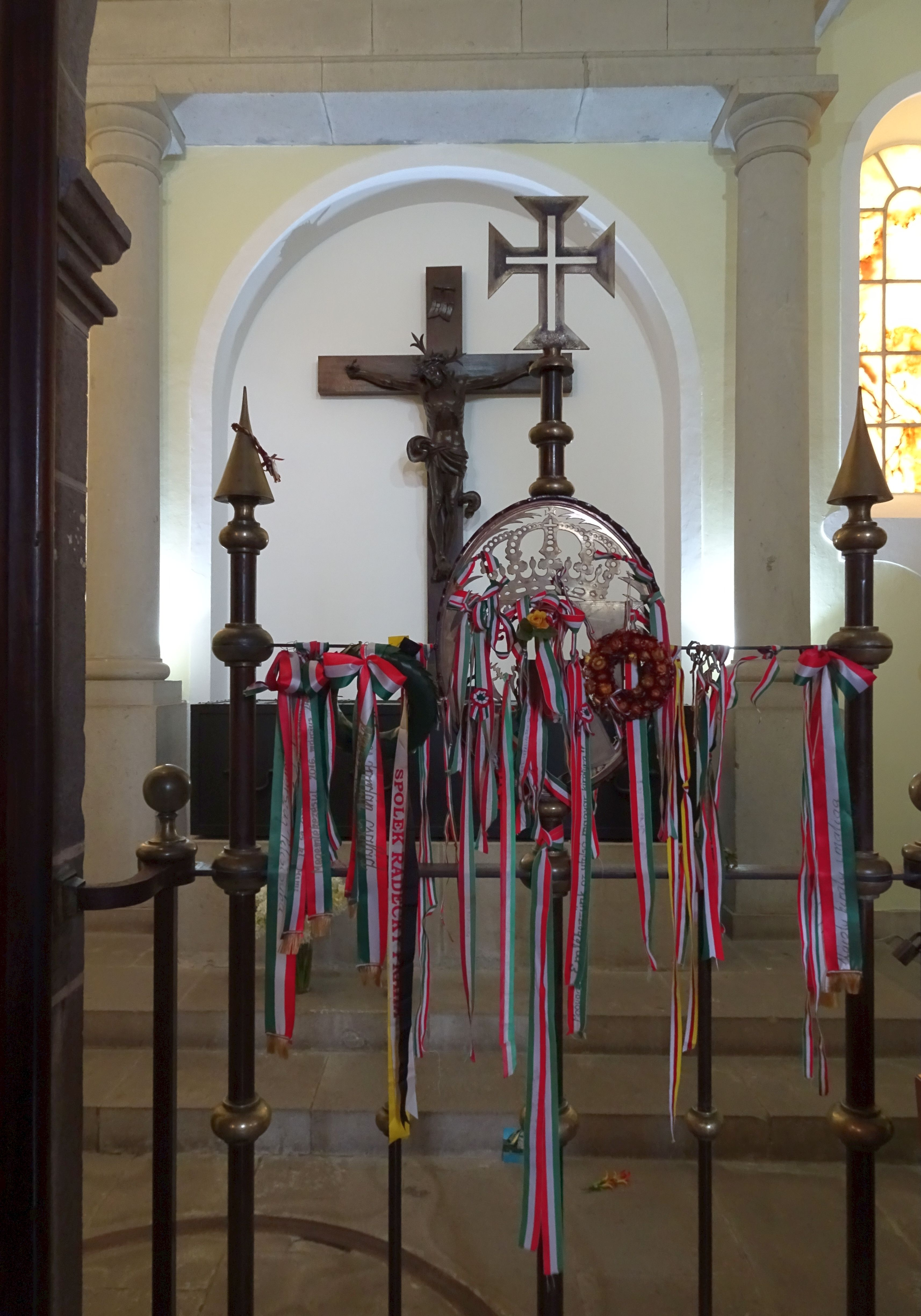

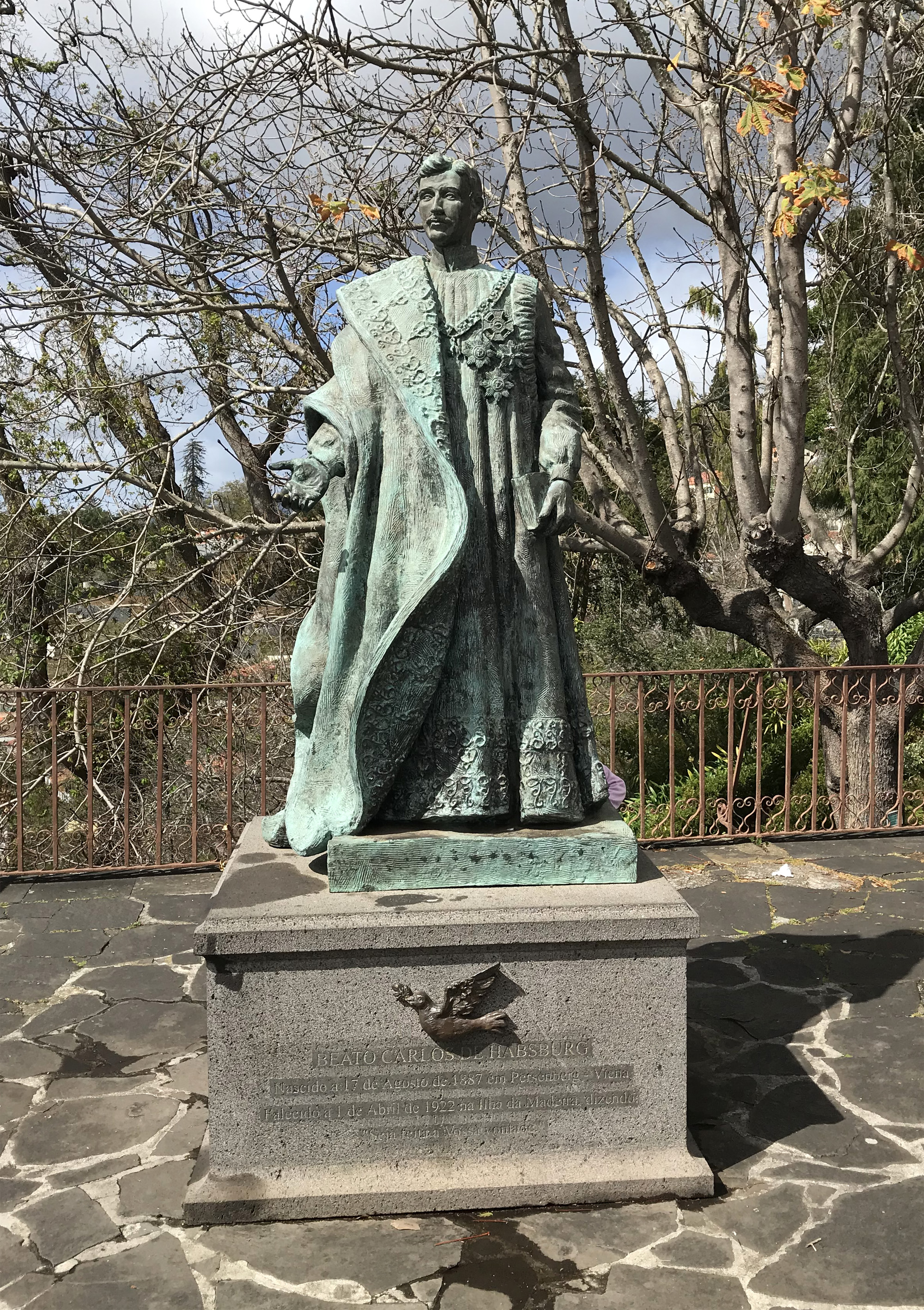
