= Carros de cesto do Monte =

Carts with baskets on skids in Funchal, Madeira

Carros de cesto do Monte (from pt. basket carts from Monte), known as Monte Toboggan – means of transportation from Monte in Funchal, the capital of Portuguese island Madeira. It consists of carts that are wicker baskets mounted on skids, sometimes compared to toboggan. They are pushed by men called Carreiros. Currently, they are a tourist attraction.

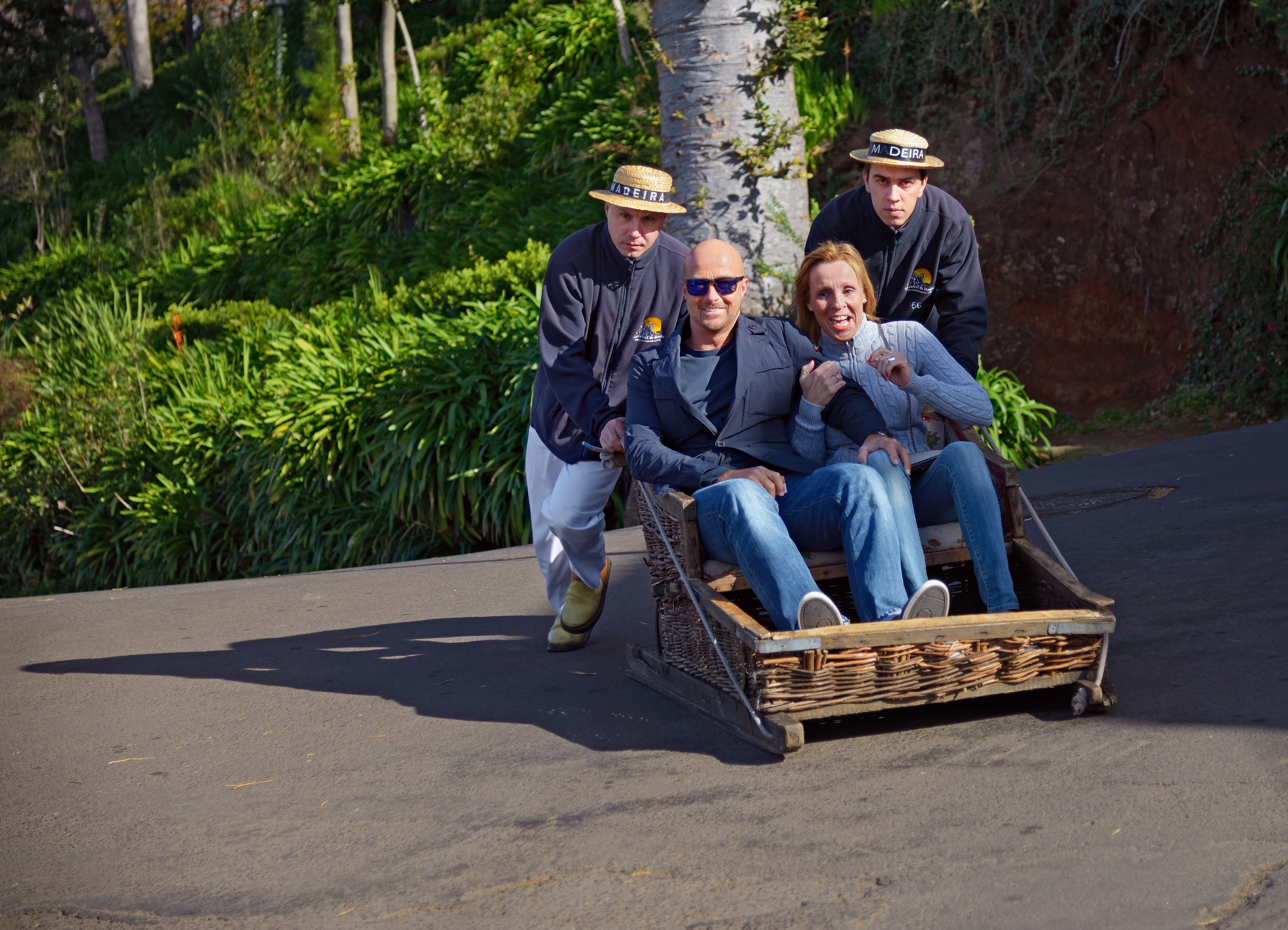
Carreiros pushing a cart with tourists.

Location of the Carreiros upper station on the map of Madeira.

== History ==
The carts were invented in 1850, when the inhabitants of what was then the village of Monte, wanted to travel quickly to Funchal below. Currently, they are one of the biggest tourist attractions of Madeira. The route is about 2 kilometers long and runs through the streets of the city. The vehicle reaches a speed of approximately 38 km/h (Note: Some sources report faster speeds.) and arrives at the bottom station in just over 5 minutes. The carts are driven by men called Carreiros, dressed in white and wearing straw hats (boaters). They also use rubber-soled shoes that allow them to brake the carts.

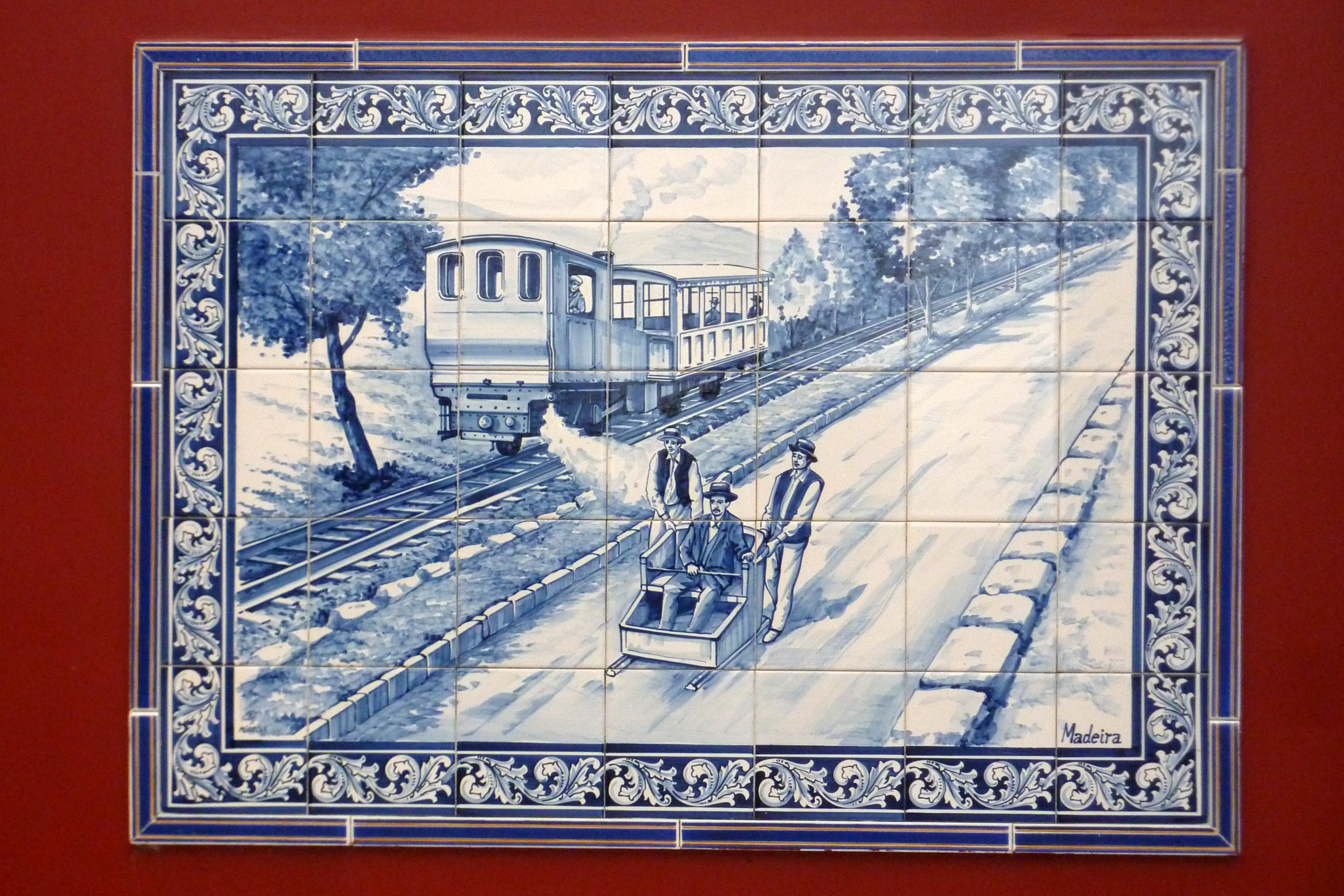
Carro de Cesto shown on an azulejo.

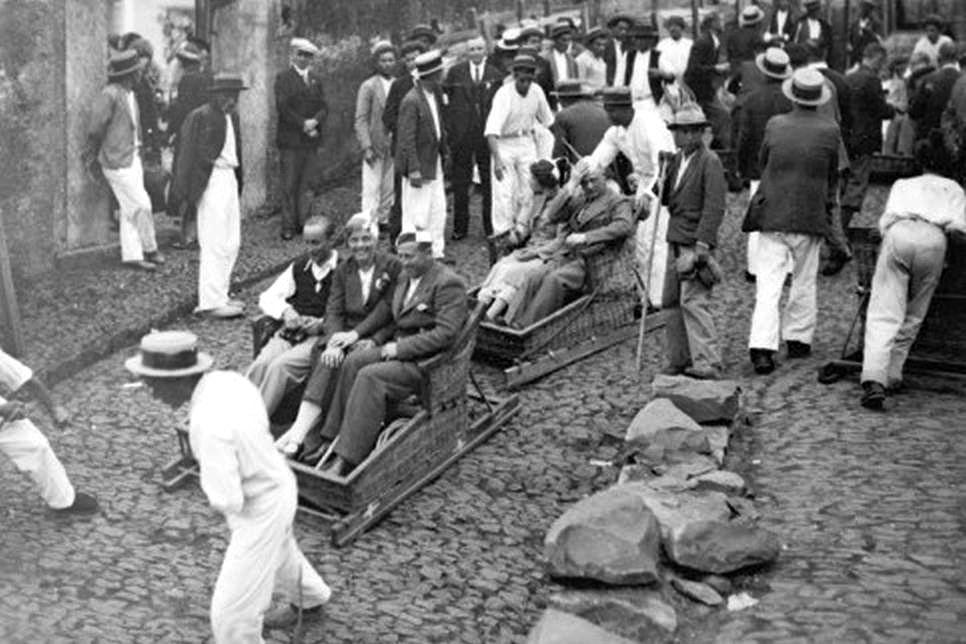
Carreiros in 1935.

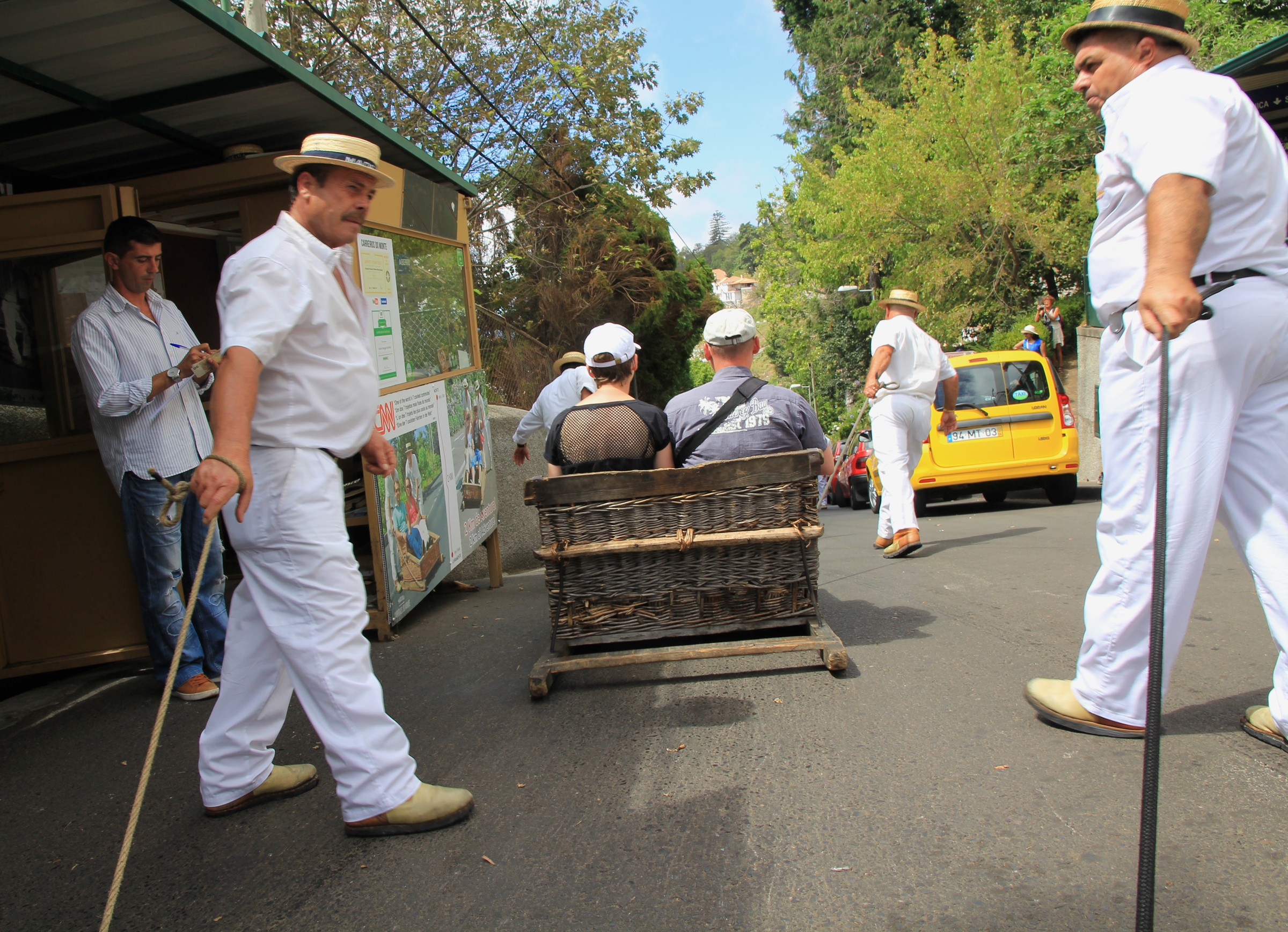
Beginning of a ride.

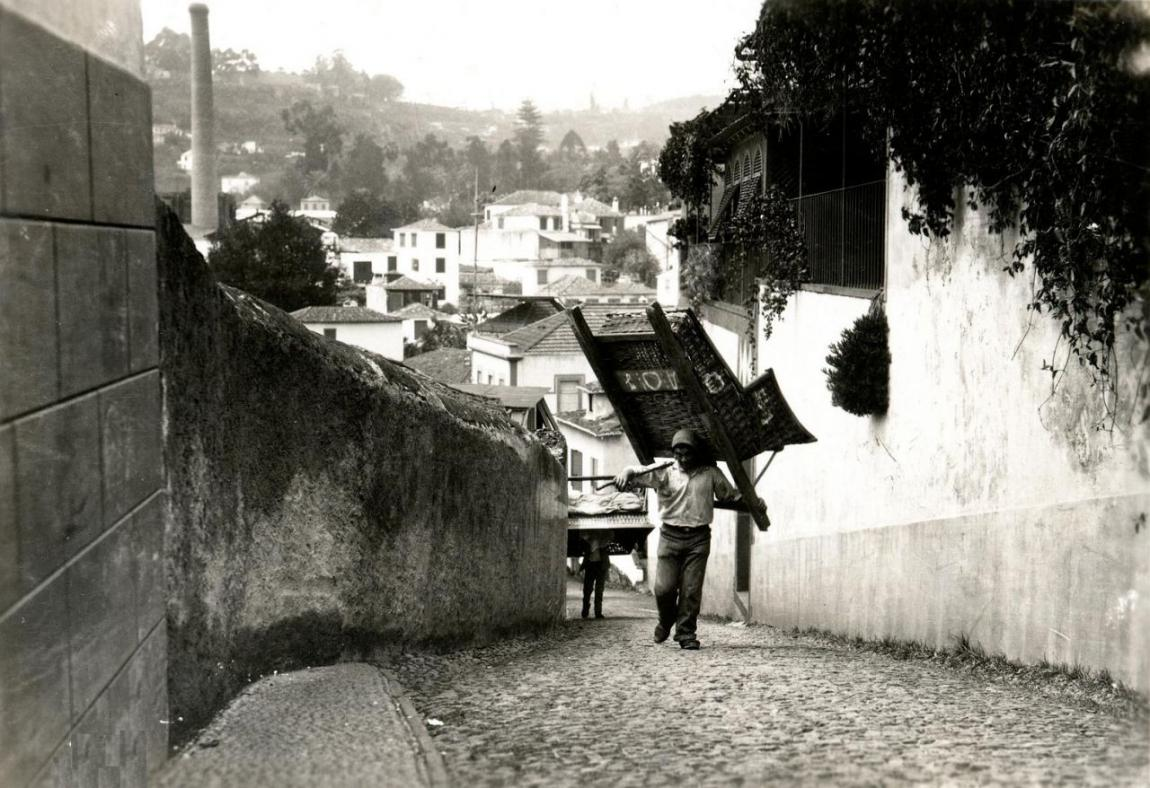
Bringing carts back, up the Monte hill in 1930.

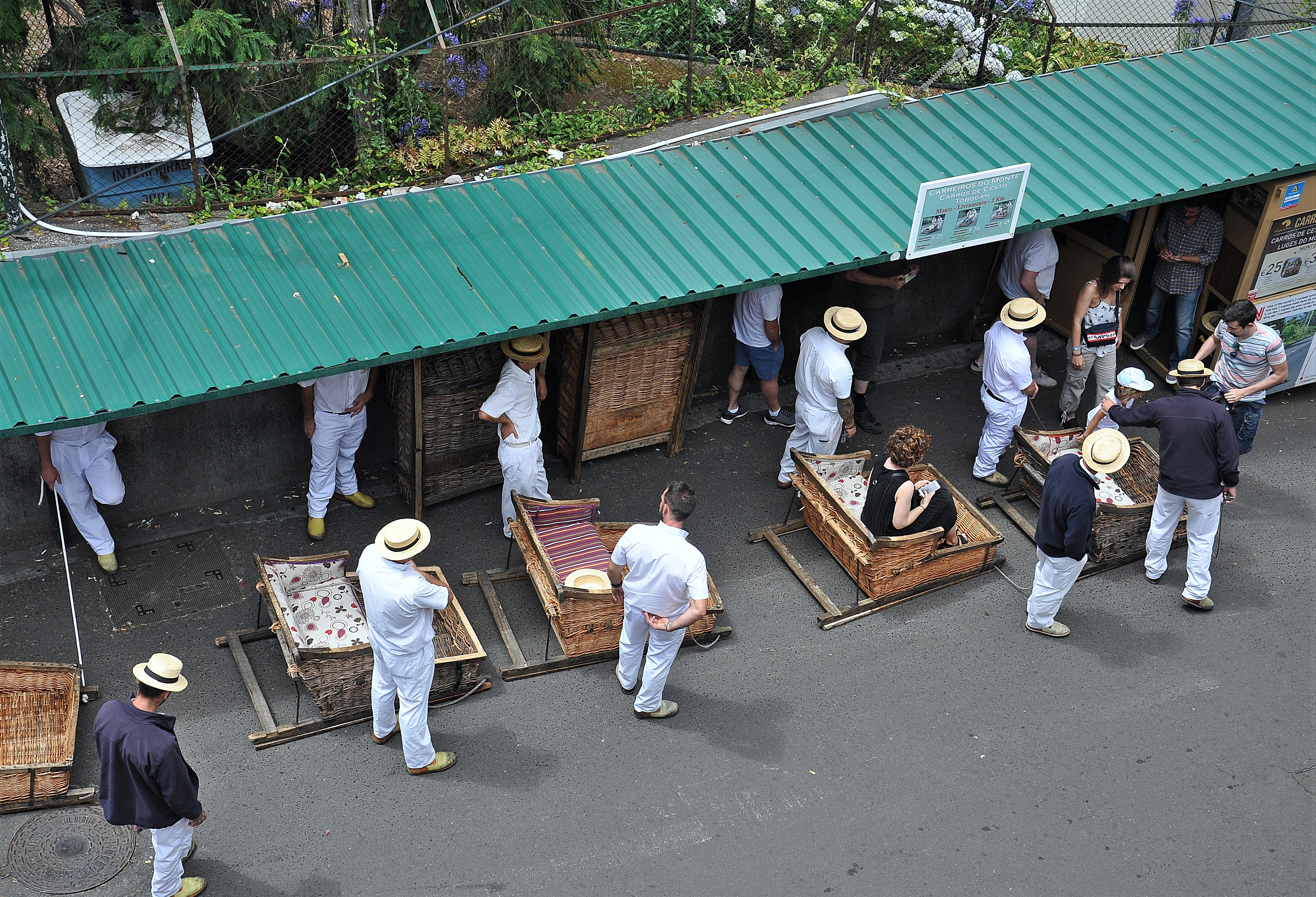
The upper station of Carros de cesto in the Monte district.

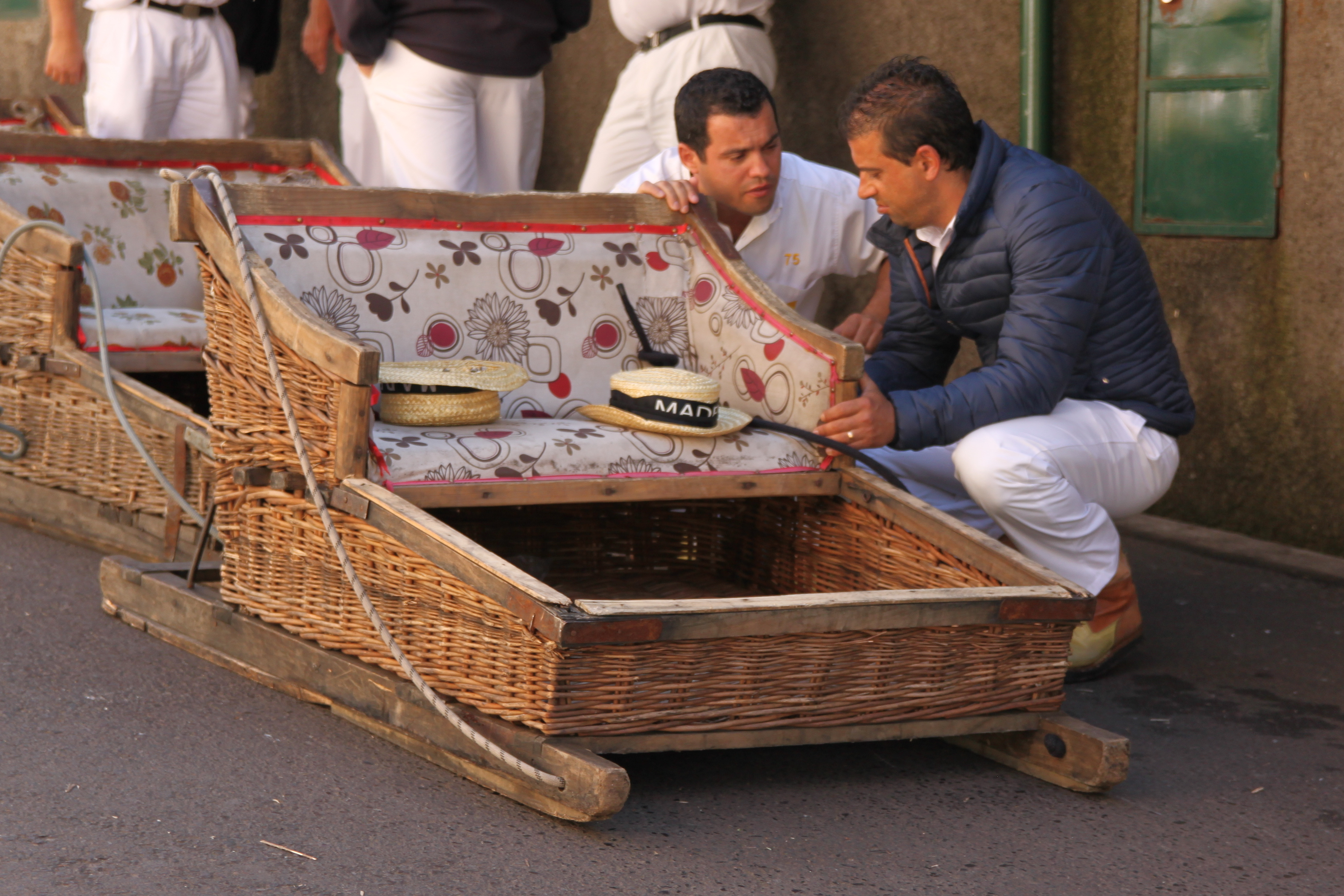
Toboggans used for the rides.
