= Estádio do Marítimo =

Football stadium in Funchal, Madeira, Portugal

- O Caldeirão (The Cauldron)
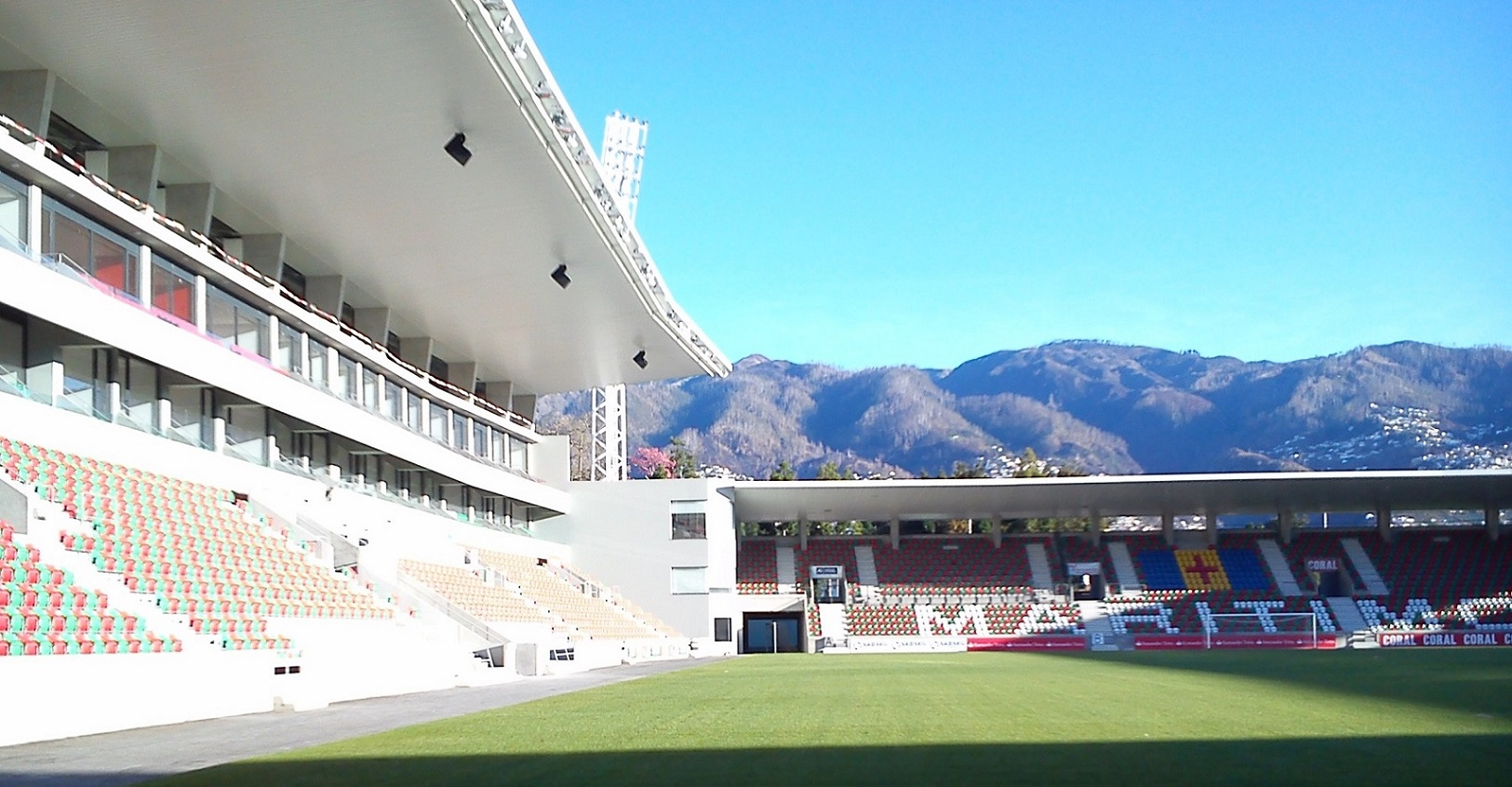
- UEFA
- Interactive map of Estádio do Marítimo
- Full name: Estádio do Marítimo
- Former names: Campo dos Barreiros (1927–1957); Estádio dos Barreiros (1957–1969, 1974–2013); Estádio do Professor Marcelo Caetano (1969–1974)
- Location: Funchal, Madeira, Portugal
- Coordinates: 32°38′44.02″N 16°55′41.99″W
- Owner: Club Sport Marítimo
- Capacity: 10,932
- Executive suites: 42
- Surface: Grass
- Record attendance: 25,000 (15 May 1977); Marítimo 4–0 Olhanense
- Field size: 105 x 68 m

Construction
- Groundbreaking: 1925
- Opened: 5 May 1957
- Renovated: 20 July 2009 until 2 December 2016
- Cost: 848,000 escudos (1927); 12,000,000 escudos (1957); 46,500,000 euros (2016)
- Architects: Couto Martins (1957); Pedro Araújo (2016)

Tenants
- Marítimo (1934–present); Nacional (1927–1999); União (1933–2008, 2011–2012); Portugal national football team (selected matches)

The Estádio do Marítimo, still commonly known by its former name, the Estádio dos Barreiros, is a football stadium in Funchal, Madeira, and is owned by Club Sport Marítimo. The stadium currently has a capacity of 10,932 specators.

The ground has occupied the Barreiros site since 1927. An earlier football ground built by Clube Desportivo Nacional was replaced by a multi-purpose municipal stadium inaugurated in 1957, and that stadium was substantially reconstructed as a football-specific venue between 2009 and 2016.

== History ==
=== Campo dos Barreiros (1927–1953) ===
During the early 1920s, Clube Desportivo Nacional pursued the construction of a sports ground that could accommodate football and other activities away from the shared Campo do Almirante Reis. Possible locations included Rua Nova da Alegria and Levada de Santa Luzia; the club selected the current site near Estrada Monumental. Fundraising began in 1923 and construction began in 1925. The Campo dos Barreiros, also styled as Stadium dos Barreiros, opened on 26 June 1927 with a goalless match between Nacional and Vitória de Setúbal. Work continued on the site until 1930 and reportedly cost approximately 848,000 escudos (848 contos).

The new ground gradually replaced Almirante Reis as a venue for major matches in Funchal. On 17 July 1930, Marítimo defeated Tenerife 3–1 at Barreiros, but this did not mark a permanent move for the club. Marítimo were opposed to the transfer of official regional fixtures from Almirante Reis to Barreiros as, according to historian Deodato Rodrigues, Nacional received as much as 35% of match receipts for the use of its ground, whereas Almirante Reis had been available without comparable charges. In 1933, Marítimo, União and Império supported efforts to reopen Almirante Reis for official matches and, in protest of the Funchal Football Association's decision, Marítimo and Império did not take part in the 1933–34 championship. Marítimo returned to regional competition in for the 1934–35 season, now playing at Barreiros.

In 1938, because of Nacional's precarious financial situation, leading to an overall poor maintenance and decay of the facilities, the club asked for assistance from the regional government in the way of a loan, remortgaging the land to a value of 280,000 escudos.

Funchal's desperation for a major sports venue had been recognised as far back as the 1920s by the local government, and with this in mind, the council purchased the land from the club at a price of 847,000 escudos to avoid the land falling into the hands of creditors, who would most likely have auctioned it off for agriculture use or property development.

The deeds were signed on 24 February 1939, under the condition that the land would be used solely for its original purpose as a sports facility. Plans were drawn up by local architect Couto Martins for a 17,000 capacity stadium, complete with an athletics track, car parks and access roads. Building commenced on 21 March 1951, with local manufacturer João Augusto de Sousa awarded the contract and engineers Félix do Amaral, João Marques de Almeida, and Rui Vieira also working on the construction, which cost a total of 12,000,000 escudos.

Estádio dos Barreiros was officially opened on 5 May 1957 by minister Arantes e Oliveira, and with a football match between a Madeira Select team and the Portugal B team, who ran out 5–2 winners in front of over 12,000 fans. Floodlights were installed a decade later and the first match played under the new lights took place on 28 May 1967.

In 1969, the regional government renamed the stadium, assigning it the name of Estádio do Professor Marcelo Caetano. However, the decision was not too popular with local fans and quickly fell into disuse, and was reverted to Estádio dos Barreiros. On 15 May 1977, a record crowd of 25,000 people squeezed into the stadium to see Marítimo gain promotion to the Primeira Liga for the first time. Due to the higher than capacity crowd, many spectators sat on the athletics running track and on the roof of the changing rooms to get a view of the match.

On 12 May 1991, approximately 30,000 people participated in an open-air mass at the stadium, during a visit of Pope John Paul II.

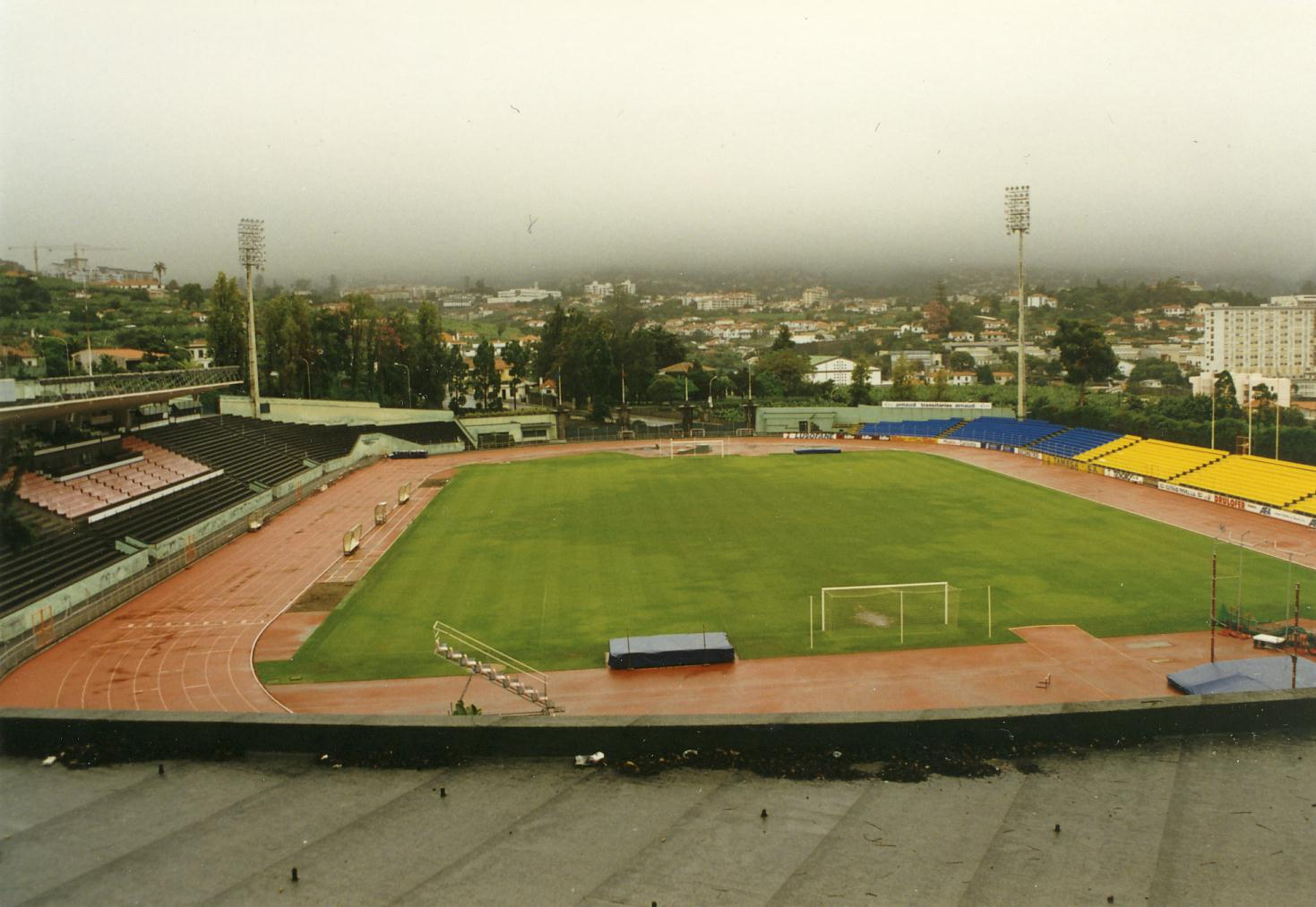
Old Estádio dos Barreiros

The stadium was home to Madeira's top three football clubs for many years, and this showed on the poor quality of the pitch, which could not handle three matches a week. In 2000, Nacional moved out into their own new stadium, the Estádio Eng. Rui Alves (now called the Estádio da Madeira) located in the Choupana district, to the north of Funchal.

Although it has had several modifications over the years, the unique stadium has remained true to its original structure, with seating and new floodlights being the only major changes on the site. The stadium is known as the Caldeirão (Cauldron) throughout Portugal, because of its famous uncomfortable and hostile atmosphere, the stadium has become a fortress for Marítimo, with many big teams struggling to win any points on their visits, notably Benfica, who famously took ten years to secure a win at the stadium, ending the curse in 2003.

== New Stadium ==
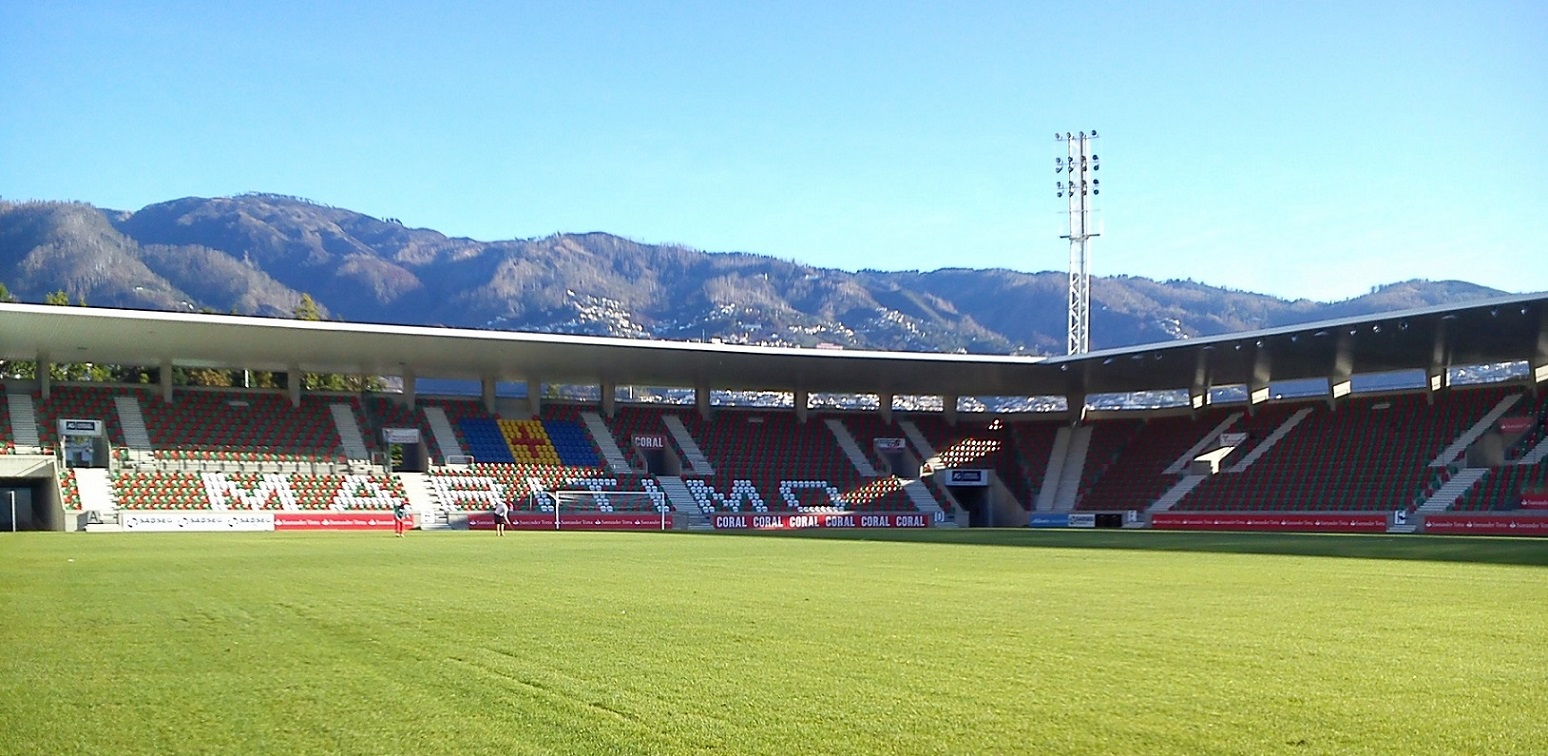
The new north and east stand

In 2006, Marítimo unveiled ambitious plans for a new stadium in the Praia Formosa area of the city placing Barreiros' future as a major football venue in doubt, with União also working towards relocation. However, after several delays and a political war over funding and planning, the stadium plans were put on hold indefinitely, adding to a list of set-backs that stretch well over a decade.

The fact that archrivals Nacional were allowed to construct a new stand and training facility at their Estádio da Madeira with government backing, angered Marítimo's fans even more. A year later, on September 14, 2007, an agreement between the club's directors and the Madeiran government (of whom own a 40% share of the club) was reached to use the site of the current Estádio dos Barreiros as the location of a brand new, reconstructed commercial stadium.

In October 2008, União moved back to their spiritual home at the Campo do Adelino Rodrigues in the heart of the city centre, leaving Marítimo as Barreiros' sole tenants and paving the way for complete redevelopment of the new stadium. Work began on the new stadium on July 20, 2009, with the realigning of the pitch and demolition of the Bancada Nascente, reducing the capacity to 5,000 seats. The stadium will have a capacity of 10,600 seats and will be completed by December 2016.

== Portugal national team matches ==
The following national team matches were held in the stadium.

| # | Date | Score | Opponent | Competition |
|---|---|---|---|---|
| 1. | 30 March 1977 | 1–0 | Switzerland | Friendly |
| 2. | 29 March 1987 | 2–2 | Malta | Euro 1988 qualifying |
| 3. | 28 February 2001 | 3–0 | Andorra | World Cup 2002 qualification |
Matches held in the new stadium
| 4. | 28 March 2017 | 2–3 | Sweden | Friendly |

== See also ==
- Campo do Almirante Reis
- Estádio da Madeira
- Marítimo
- Nacional da Madeira
- União da Madeira
