= Funchal Cable Car =

Gondola lift in Funchal, Portugal

Funchal-Monte Cable Car
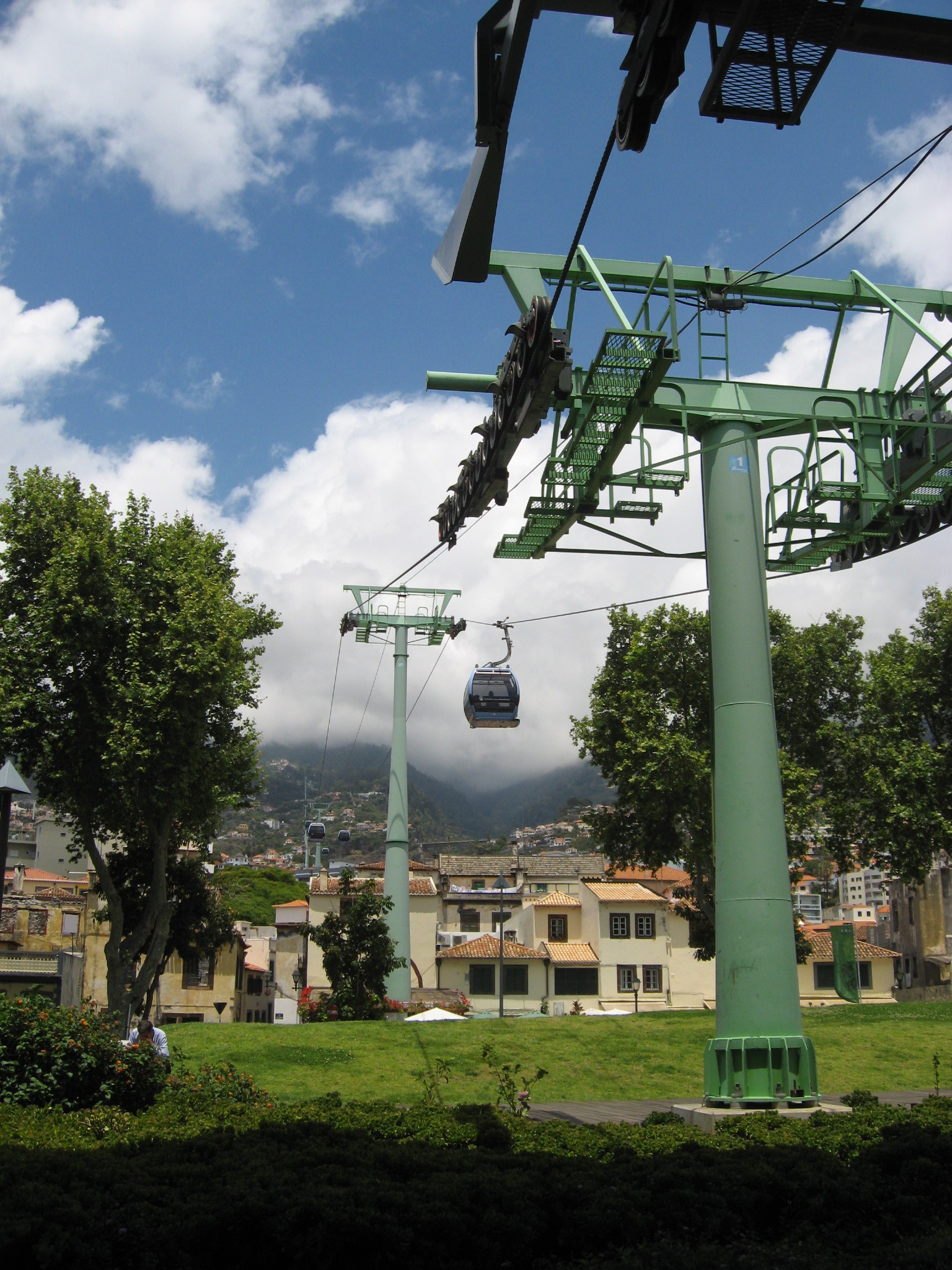
- Ground view of the Funchal Cable Car

Overview
- Status: Operational
- Character: Elevated
- Location: Funchal, Madeira
- Termini: Funchal in the old town 32.6472°N 16.9022°W; Monte (Funchal); 32.6755°N 16.9003°W
- Open: 2000

Technical features
- Aerial lift type: Gondola lift
- Operating speed: 5 m/s

The Funchal Cable Car (Portuguese: Teleférico do Funchal), or Madeira Cable Car, is a gondola lift that transports people from the lower section of Funchal, Madeira to the suburb of Monte.

== History ==
The route of the cable car was chosen to replace the old Monte Railway, which ran from 1886 to 1943.

Construction of the cable car system began in September 1999; it was opened in November 2000 and has been in service since then. The bottom station is located at Almirante Reis Park in central Funchal. The length of the cable car line is 3,173 m and the height difference is 560 m; the journey takes approx. 15 minutes. The cableway has over 39 cabins with 7 seats each, and can transport up to 800 passengers per hour.
