= Monte (Funchal) =

- Civil parish
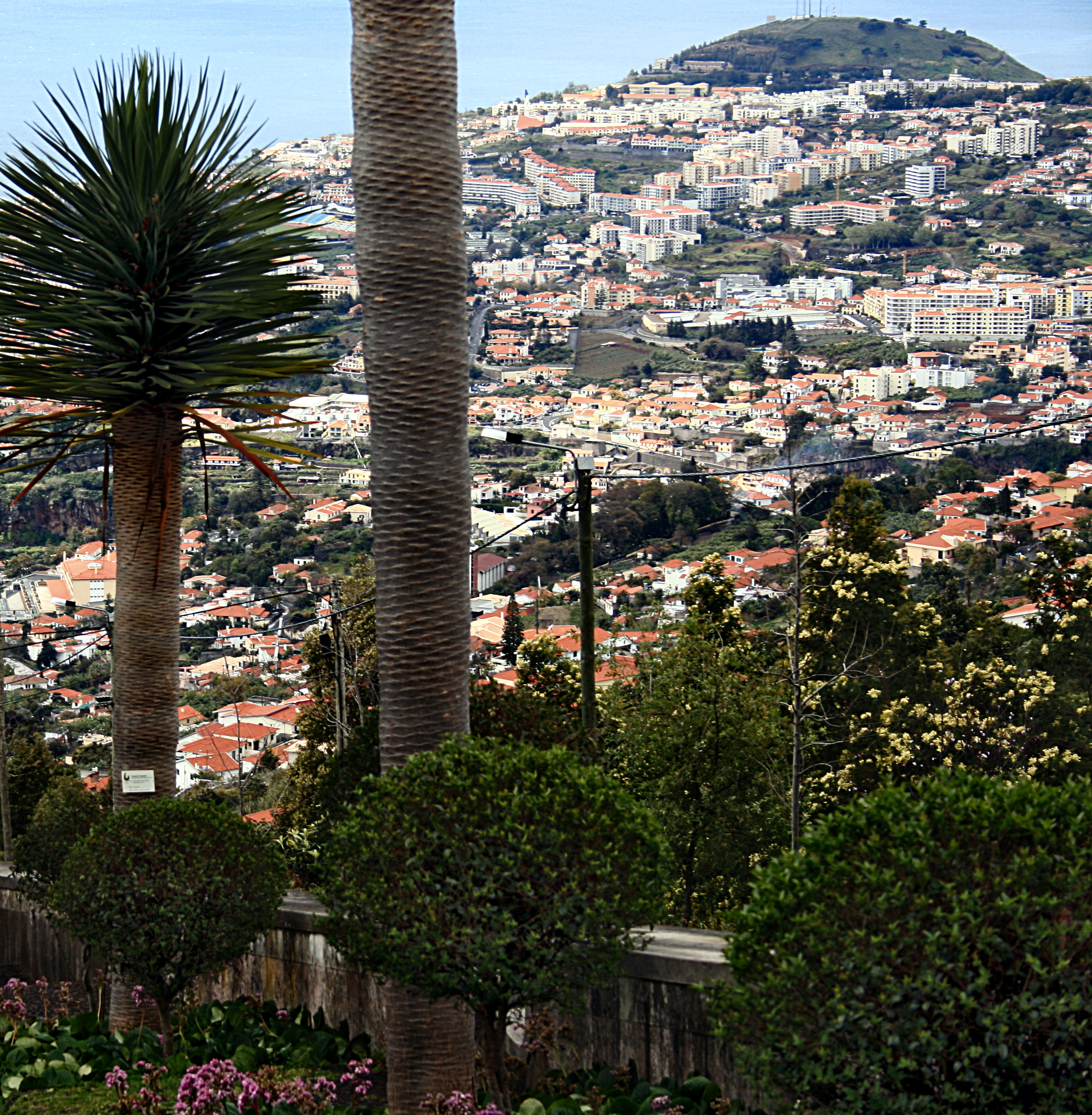
- Monte as seen from the centre of Funchal

- Location in Madeira
- Coordinates: 32°41′30″N 16°53′58″W
- Country: Portugal
- Auton. region: Madeira
- Island: Madeira
- Municipality: Funchal
- Established: Settlement: fl. 1500; Parish: c. 1565

Area
  - Total: 18.59 km^{2} (7.18 sq mi)
- Elevation: 1,025 m (3,363 ft)

Population (2011)
  - Total: 6,701
  - Density: 360.5/km^{2} (933.6/sq mi)
- Time zone: UTC+00:00 (WET)
  - Summer (DST): UTC+01:00 (WEST)
- Postal code: 9050-208
- Area code: 291
- Patron: Our Lady of the Mount
- Website: www.freguesiadomonte.com

Monte (English: Mount) is a civil parish in the municipality and a suburb of Funchal in the Portuguese archipelago of Madeira. Locally, the parish is also known as Nossa Senhora do Monte (English: Our Lady of the Mount). The population in 2011 was 6,701, in an area of 18.59 km^{2}. Monte is located a few kilometres east of Funchal.

== History ==
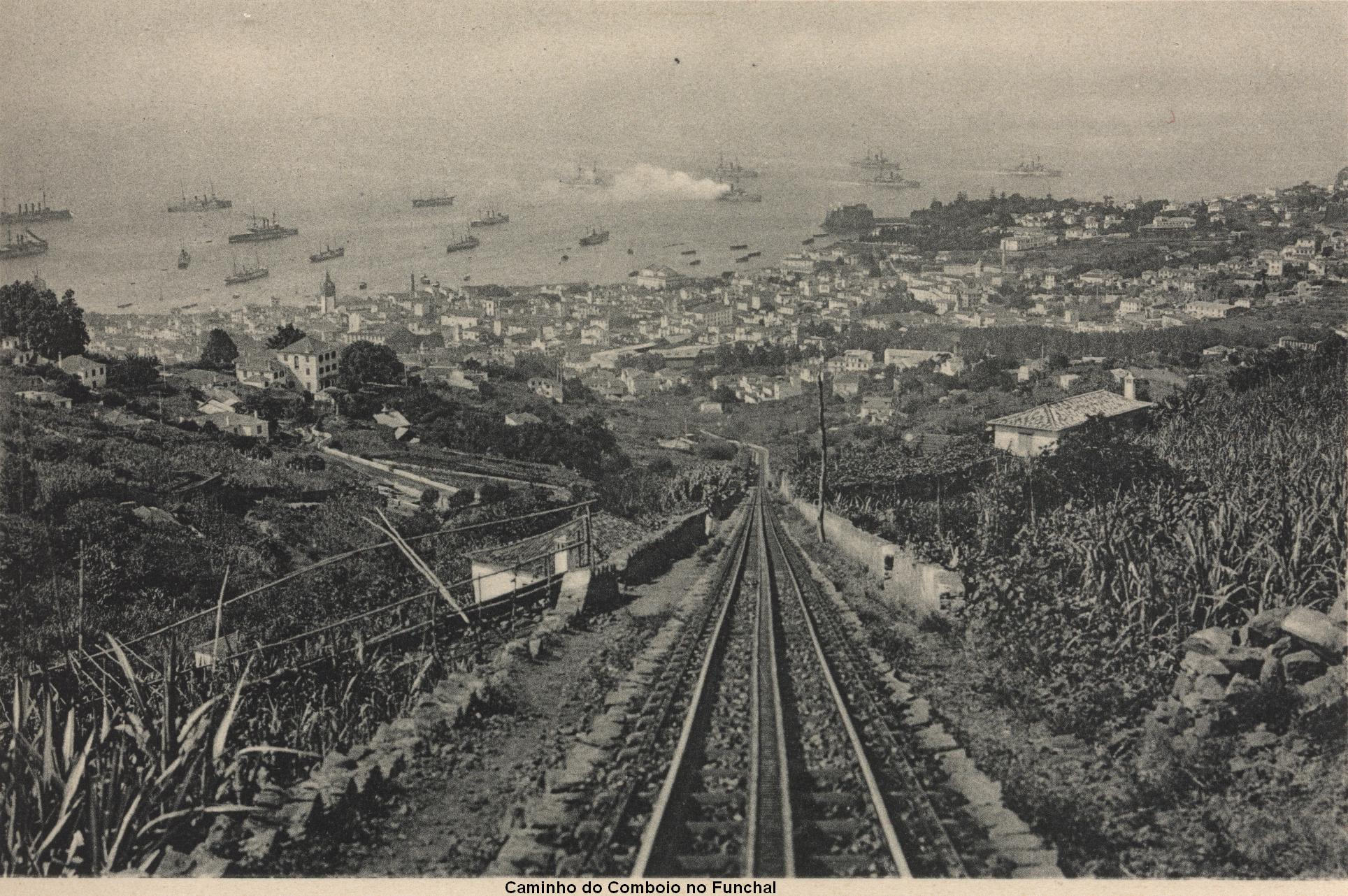
The cog railway vista, looking down to the harbour of Funchal, showing the commercial ships in the harbour

The parish of Nossa Senhora do Monte was created in 1565, turning itself into a summer refuge for many wealthy families of Funchal. Looking to discover a mild climate in the summers, these novo riche constructed summer cottages along the hills of the district. The oldest religious building, the main church Igreja de Nossa Senhora do Monte was constructed in 1741.

Monte was the final resting place for Emperor Charles I of Austria, last of the Habsburg rulers of the Austro-Hungarian Empire, who died in exile on 1 April 1922. His last residence on the island was the Quinta do Monte close to the parochial church. Similarly, the Madeirense poet, Herberto Hélder lived in a home in the parish. In 1850, the residents created an innovative method of moving rapidly between Monte and Funchal. These carros de cesto (literally, English: basket cars), baskets with seats on wooden skis which were slid the inclined streets of Monte, guided by two pilots from behind, began operating in the late 19th century to descend the three kilometres to Funchal. Between 1893 and 1943, the Monte was connected to Funchal by Madeira's only cog railway (Monte Railway), which used to carry people between Funchal and Monte, but also to Terreiro da Luta (at 867 m above sea level), but was deactivated during the Second World War.

== Geography ==
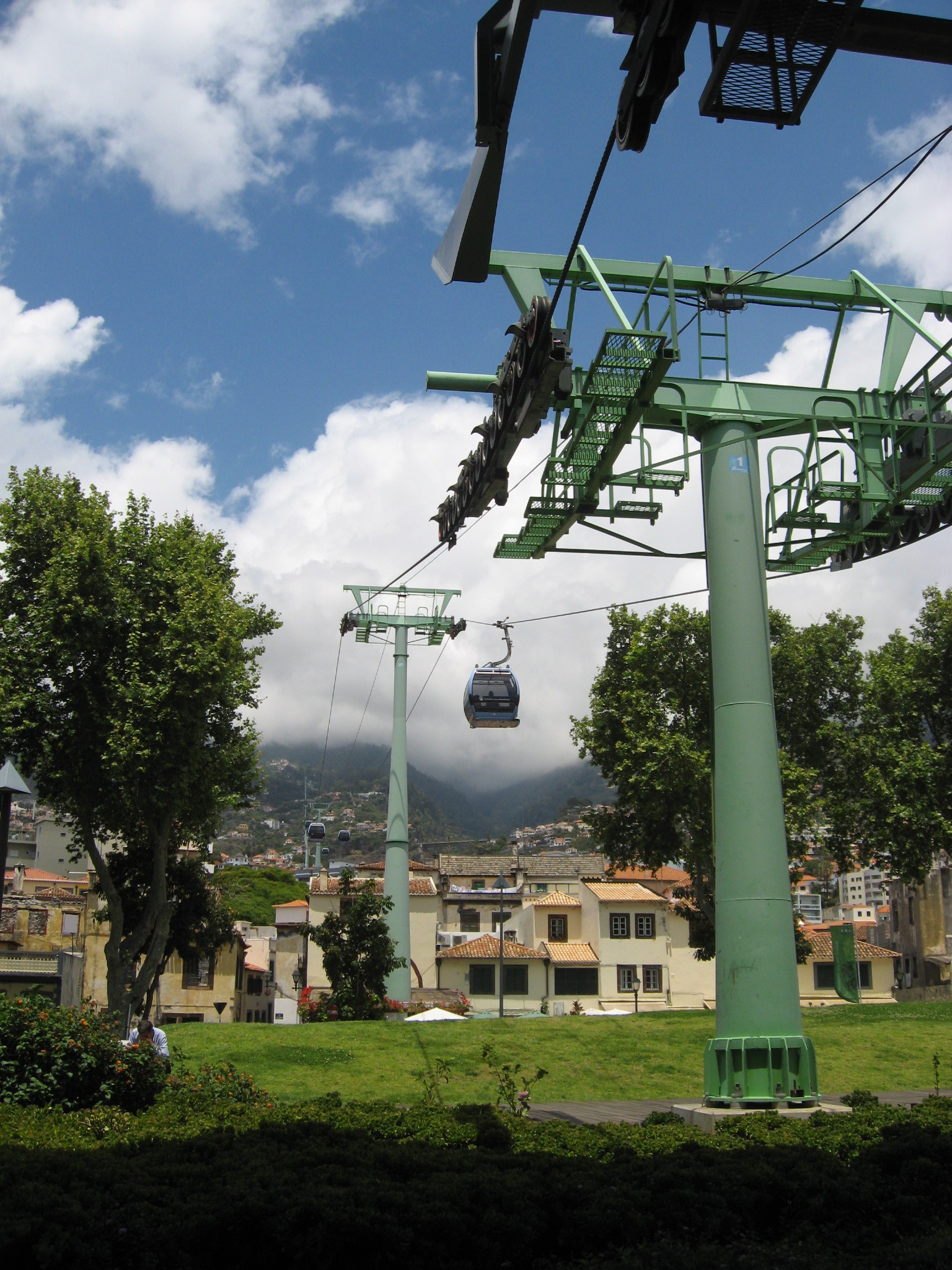
The Gondola lift attraction that ferries people up to Monte

Monte is noted for its older gardens and greenspaces, with exotic plants and flowers, some open to the public. Monte is served by inclined cable car to Funchal and the Botanical Gardens. The parish is also criss-cross by old water channels constructed to transport water between Monte and Camaca, which pass through the Curral dos Romeiros. Central Monte, overlooking the neighboring Santa Luzia and Imaculade Coração, is peppered by various hotels, small restaurantes, and local institutions, including the Hospital dos Marmeleiros and the local health centre.

The parish of Monte literally extends along the mountainous foothills in the northeast corner of the municipality of Funchal, limited by the valley of Ribeira de João Gomes and west by the river-valley of Fundoa. The altimetry increases considerably from 300 to 1300 metres along its border, and the parish is marked by various cliffs, overlooks, ravines and water courses. Its picturesque vantage point has resulted, over the years, in the construction of many homes and buildings in conditions that are precarious or dangerous. This construction has degraded the natural forested areas and facilitated the movement of water that has resulted in natural catastrophes, such as the 2010 mudslides, which caused the death and injury of many in the parish. Similarly, in the summer, the hot dry climate has made the forests in the parish susceptible to forest fires.

== Tourism ==
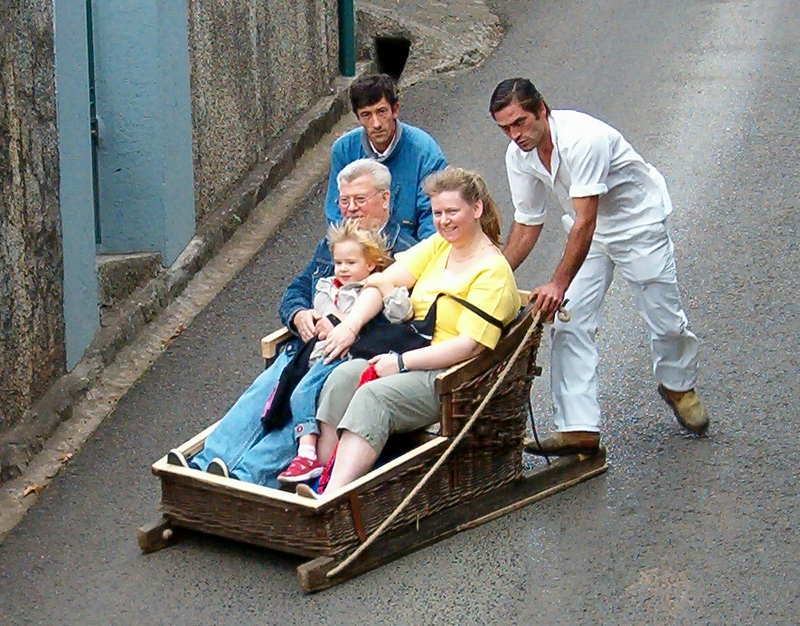
The toboggan drivers do not always wear the uniform, but ferry tourists downhill at high speeds

Presently, Monte can be accessed via the Funchal Cable Car (a gondola lift), which was first opened nearly 100 years after the opening of the cog railway. The departing station is located at Parque Almirante Reis in downtown Funchal. The length of the cable car line is 3,718 metres (12,198 ft), the height difference is 560 metres (1,840 ft) and the journey time (one way) 15 minutes. The line has over 39 cabs with 8 seats each carrying 800 passengers per hour. Also, the basket cars or tobogan run, remains one of the most popular features of Monte for the visitors. This enables visitors to be transported 2 kilometres (1.2 mi) downhill to Livramento through the streets at fairly high speeds in large wicker baskets known as carros de cesto do Monte, conducted by two drivers wearing the traditional white uniform with straw boaters.

== See also ==
- Church of Our Lady of the Mount
