= Campo Almirante Reis =

Former football ground and historic public square in Funchal, Madeira

Campo do Almirante Reis
- Football match involving the crew of the yacht Rhouma, 1899
- Interactive map of Campo do Almirante Reis
- Former names: Campo de D. Carlos I (1897-1911)
- Location: Funchal, Madeira
- Coordinates: 32°38′50.8″N 16°54′7.3″W

Campo do Almirante Reis, formerly known as Campo de D. Carlos I, was a historic football ground and public square in Funchal, Madeira. Situated in Santa Maria Maior, it was one of the earliest centres of organised association football in Madeira and served as a shared venue for Funchal's football clubs during the early 20th century.

Constructed between 1898 and 1901 through redevelopment of existing military and municipal land, including the site of the former Forte Novo de São Pedro fortification, the facility was named in honour of King Carlos I of Portugal. Following the establishment of the Portuguese Republic in 1911, it was renamed in honour of naval officer and republican revolutionary Carlos Cândido dos Reis, popularly known as Almirante Reis.

The ground became particularly associated with C.S. Marítimo, which played many of its early matches there, including two victories against S.L. Benfica during the Lisbon club's first visit to Madeira in April 1922.

Throughout the 20th century, the site also accommodated military exercises, exhibitions, fairs, bullfighting and public entertainment. Following its use as a surface car park, the area was redeveloped into the Jardim do Almirante Reis, which opened in 2001, alongside the lower station of the Funchal Cable Car.

== History ==
=== Early history and military fortifications ===
Before its development as a football ground, the site was occupied by military fortifications, maritime industries and open spaces used for public activities. Situated at the eastern end of Funchal's Santa Maria Maior neighbourhood, the Forte Novo de São Pedro, also known as the Forte de São Pedro, was completed in 1707 under the governorship of Duarte Sodré Pereira and formed part of the city's coastal defences.

The neighbouring open ground was known by several names during the 19th century, including Campo das Pipas, Campo das Loucas, Campo de Challons and Campo de São Tiago. Another adjoining space, the Praça Académica, had been developed in 1837, financed by the proceeds of a theatrical performance organised by Funchal students to celebrate the marriage of Queen Maria II of Portugal. The square was subsequently used for fairs and other public gatherings.

By the late 19th century, the Forte Novo de São Pedro had become obsolete. Its demolition began on 20 September 1897, following authorisation from the Ministry of War. The removal of the fort and sections of the adjoining city wall enabled the enlargement and improvement of the waterfront public space.

=== Construction of Campo de D. Carlos I ===
During the 1890s, Funchal Municipal Council sought to improve sanitation and public conditions in the densely populated Santa Maria Maior neighbourhood. On 4 September 1897, a public deed was signed between the Portuguese Ministry of War and Funchal Municipal Council establishing arrangements for the redevelopment of land formerly occupied by the Forte Novo de São Pedro, part of the city wall and potentially the Campo das Loucas, together with municipal land forming Praça Académica and neighbouring streets. Buildings along the old Rua dos Balcões were also demolished.

On 6 September 1897, the council requested permission to name the proposed public square Campo de D. Carlos I, in honour of King Carlos I. The improvement works began in 1898 and were completed in 1901, at a cost to the municipality exceeding 24 contos de réis. The principal objective was urban sanitation and the improvement of public space, rather than the construction of a dedicated football stadium.

The enlarged ground retained a military function, with the Ministry of War maintaining rights over its use for exercises and drills but during the royal visit of King Carlos I to Madeira in June 1901, the area hosted an exhibition in temporary pavilions, reflecting its role as a venue for civic and public events.

== See also ==
- C.S. Marítimo
- Estádio dos Barreiros
