= Sport in Madeira =

On the island of Madeira, a large number of different sports are practiced, both outdoor and indoor the various facilities available throughout the island.

Amongst the variety of sports practiced on the island, it includes the following:

== Football ==
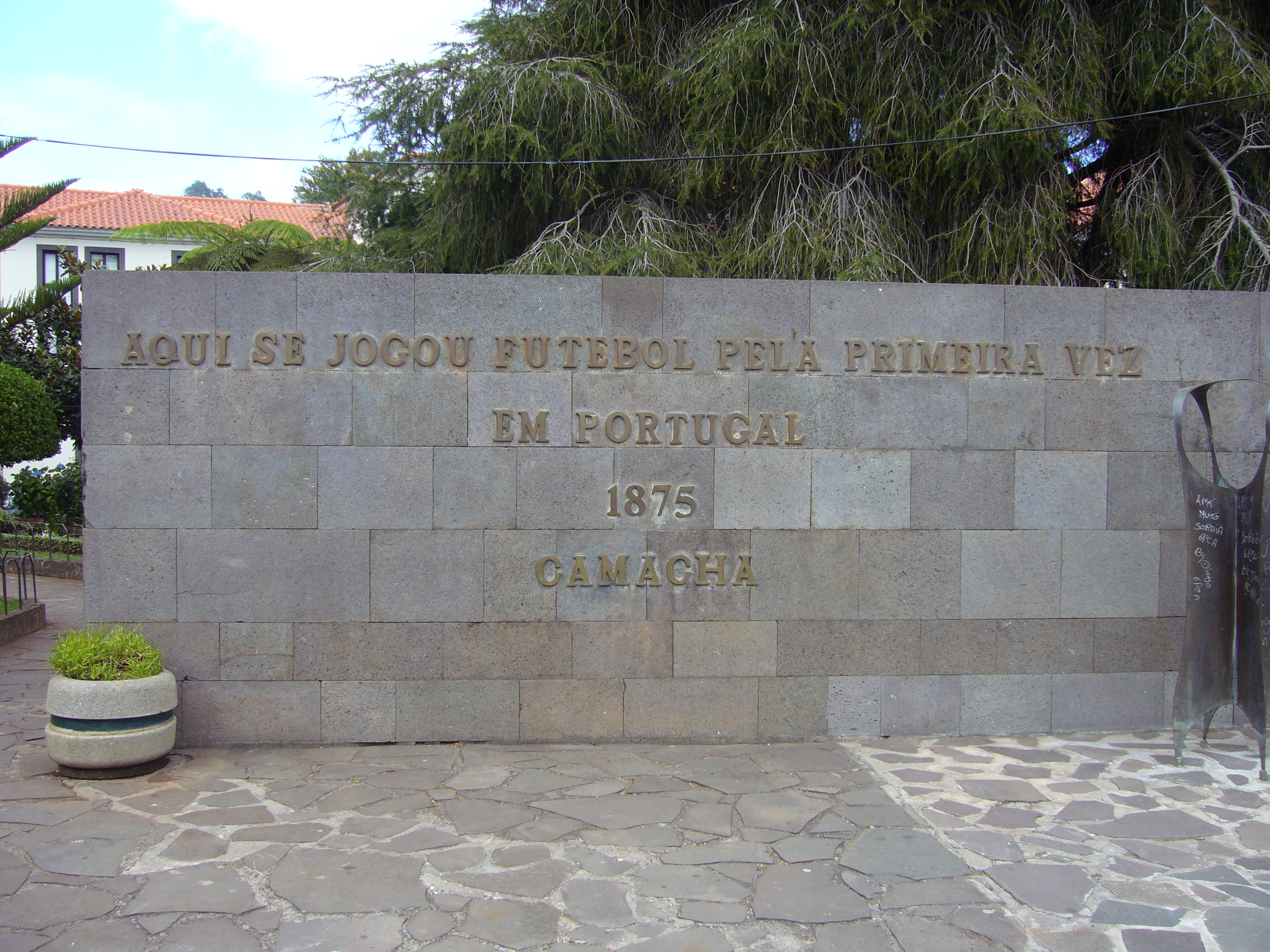
Monument in Camacha, celebrating the first ever organised football game in Portugal, that took place in 1875.

The first organised game of football took place in 1875 in Camacha, organised by the Madeira born Harry Hinton (it was the first organised football match anywhere in Portugal).

Madeira has two football teams in the Primeira Liga (Portugal's top league): C.S. Marítimo and C.D. Nacional.

The Al Nassr and Portugal footballer Cristiano Ronaldo was born in Madeira and played for CF Andorinha and Nacional before going to Sporting Lisbon.

Marítimo is considered the biggest club of Madeira and has enjoyed various campaigns in the UEFA Cup having recorded famous results against teams such as Juventus, Leeds and Rangers. Having finished 5th in the league in the 2009–10 season, Marítimo qualified for the Europa League for the 2010–11 season.

C.S. Marítimo has nurtured notable players such as Pepe, now retired, Danny, who retired at the club in 2018, Jorge Costa, a retired FC Porto player, Tarik Sektioui, another former FC Porto player among other clubs who is now managing RS Berkane, Nuno Valente, who retired at Everton in 2009, Ariza Makukula, who retired in 2014 at BEC Tero Sasana, Moussa Marega the current FC Porto player, Moussa Maâzou the current Sektzia Nes Tziona F.C. player, Bakero the journeyman who retired in 2015 at Felgueiras.

In 2003–04 Nacional achieved fourth place in the Portuguese League, their best classification ever. They repeated it three years later and are the only Madeiran team to finish fourth place in the Portuguese League. Nacional were the first Madeiran team to reach the UEFA Europa League group stage (in the 2009–10 season) until Marítimo reached the group stages in the 2012–13 season. Cristiano Ronaldo, a football player, played in Nacional until he was 12 years old before moving to Sporting Lisbon. Nacional plays in the Madeira Stadium (Estádio da Madeira), considered by CNN in 2011, one of the eight more unusual stadiums in the world. Besides Cristiano Ronaldo, other known footballers have also played at Nacional including Paulo Assunção (F.C. Porto and Atlético Madrid among others), Rúben Micael (Porto and Real Zaragoza among others, current Nacional player), Maicon (Porto among others), Diego Benaglio (Wolfsburg among others) and Felipe Lopes (Wolfsburg among others).

Outside the Portuguese top league, there are four other Madeiran teams not in the District Championships, all in the Campeonato de Portugal: União da Madeira, a former Primeira Liga side, Câmara de Lobos, Marítimo B (the reserve team of Marítimo), and A.D. Camacha, a newly promoted side.

== Basketball ==
In recent years, Madeira has had a considerable amount of success in professional basketball, with CAB Madeira having won numerous titles, especially their female team. CAB is often seen competing in European matches such as the FIBA EuroCup and former stars include Filipe da Silva and ex-Los Angeles Lakers player Ike Nwankwo.

== Surfing ==
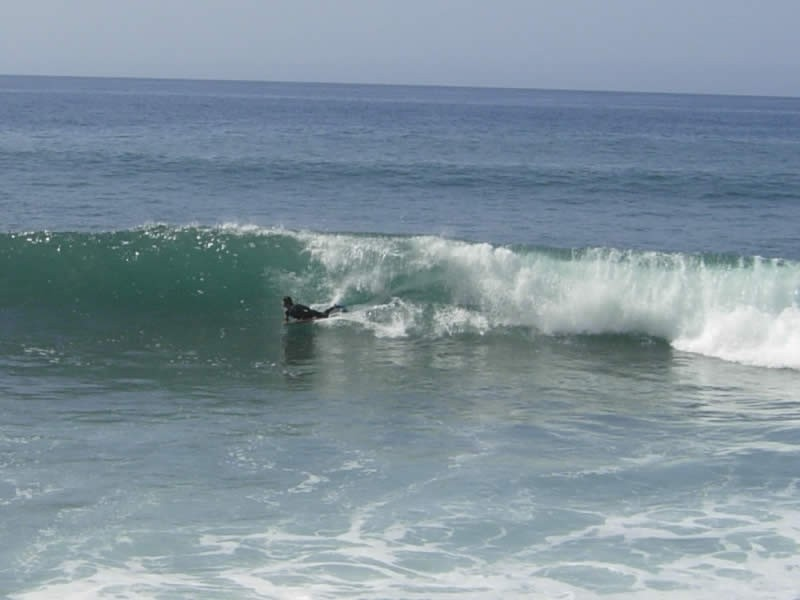
Paul do Mar: this spot, according to surf experts, has the best barreling waves (also known as tubular, tunnel waves) on Madeira. Both stand-up surfing and bodyboarding are practised at this spot.

In 2001 the World Surfing Championships were held in Madeira at Surfspots including Paul do Mar, Ponta Pequena and Jardim do Mar (see Surfing in Madeira).

== Handball ==
Madeira Andebol SAD, the island's women's professional handball team is one of the most successful in the country.

== Running ==
The oldest Saint Silvester Road Race in Portugal and one of the oldest in the Europe Union is held every December 28 and is called the Volta à cidade do Funchal and is made up of professional and amateur runners.

There is also the Madeira Island Ultra Trail which is an ultramarathon, that takes place once a year.

More to that there are: Boa Ventura Trail run, Sky Trail Camp – Porto da Cruz, Trail de Porto Moniz – São Vicente, Madeira Trail Camp – São Vicente, Trail do Porto Santo, Madeira Trail Series – São Vicente, Trail do Ludens de Machico, Corrida Nocturna Baia dos Descubrimentos, Vertical KM – Câmara de Lobos, Trail da Zona Militar da Madeira, Ultra Sky Marathon Madeira, Cristo Rei Trail, Funchal Sky Race, Trail de Água de Pena, Ultra Trail Porto da Cruz Natura, Trail de Santa Cruz, Vertical KM – Funchal, Madeira Uphill 2000, Vertical KM – Fanal, Eco Trail do Funchal, Trail de Câmara de Lobos, Trail da Calheta, Trail Nocturno de Machico, Source

== Scuba diving ==
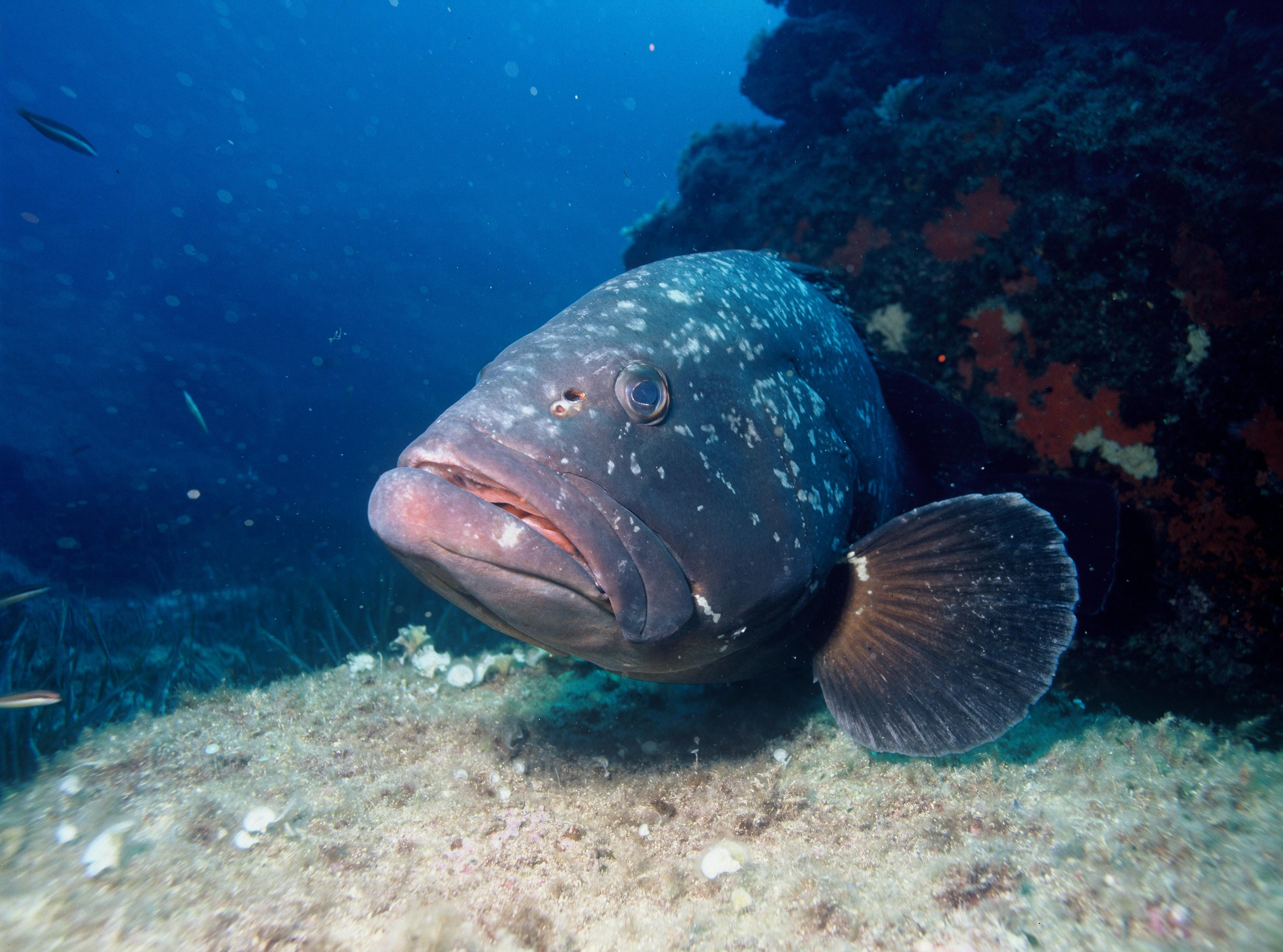

Scuba diving has become very popular in recent years due to the crystal waters and the abundance of life that characterize Madeira. The Marine Reserve of Garajau and the Marine park of Cabo Girão where lies the Wreck of the F488 Afonso Cerqueira, can offer the best dive sites of the island. These areas are reachable from the dive shops of Funchal.

The clear waters and marine life of Madeira, known for its numerous nature reserves and marine areas, offer many dive spots. The marine fauna of this region consists mainly of coastal species. Sandy and rocky bottoms host numerous species of marine creatures: groupers (Epinephelus guaza) and other serranids, salps, sea bream, mullet, scorpion fish (Scorpaena scrofa), moray eels, octopuses, cuttlefish, barracudas and damsels are some of the species that divers may commonly spot. Among the invertebrates, besides various species of anemones and starfish, there are also numerous bearded fireworms (Hermodice carunculata), known for their size (up to 30cm long) and for their stinging bristles. Common are also several species of crabs. Large, typically pelagic organisms can be occasionally encountered: wahoos, tunas, cetaceans (i.e. the spotted dolphin and Risso's dolphin), sea turtles, manta rays and mobulas, and the rare monk seal (Monachus monachus).

== Walking and hiking ==
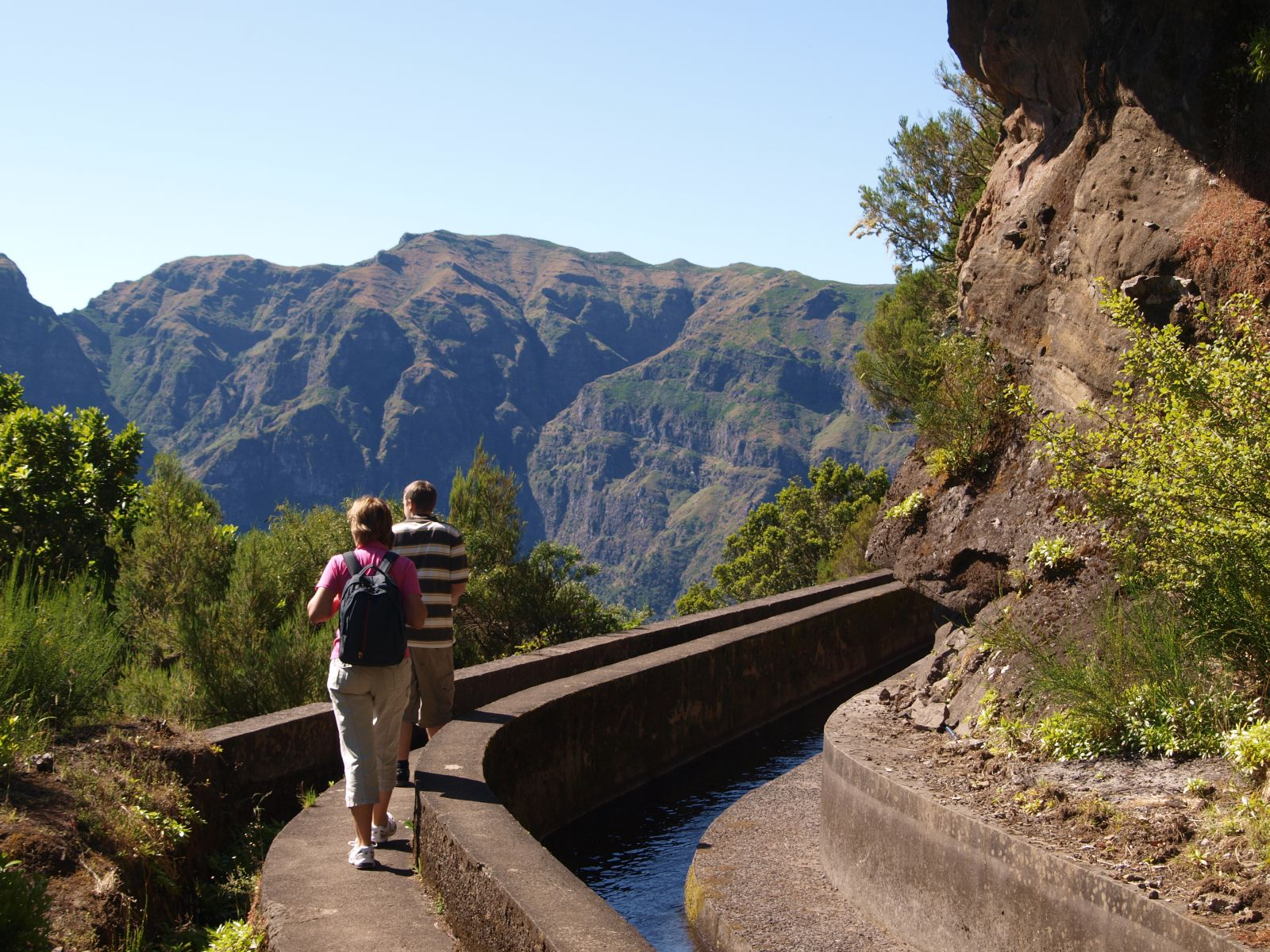
Hiking along a levada in Madeira

Madeira offers about 950 kilometres (600 miles) of walks, many alongside the levadas, some of the island's greatest attractions. The levadas provide stunning walks, some of which are quite challenging. Canyoning has increased in popularity over the last few years with many companies offering canyoning tours.

== Other sports ==
The Rali Vinho da Madeira is the largest sporting event held in the archipelago each year, attracting thousands of spectators from Europe. The motor rally (established in 1959) has been part of several international pan-European championships since the 1970s, most notably the European Rally Championship and the Intercontinental Rally Challenge.

Karting and golf are other popular sports played on the island. The island lies in an ideal location for water sports such as fishing, sailing and diving due to its climate and location. Jogo do Pau, a Portuguese martial art, is still practiced in the rural areas of the island but has declined since its peak in the early part of the 20th century.

Madeira is also popular as a Mountain bike destination, organizing stops of the Enduro World Series championship.

== See also ==
- Sport in Portugal
