= Calheta =

Calheta may refer to the following places:

== Cape Verde ==
- Calheta, Cape Verde, a village on the island of Maio
- Calheta de São Miguel, Cape Verde, a village on the island of Santiago

== Portugal ==
In the archipelago of the Azores:

- Calheta (Azores), a municipality on the island of São Jorge
  - Calheta, a civil parish in the municipality of Calheta
- Calhetas, a civil parish in the municipality of Ribeira Grande, island of São Miguel
- Calheta de Nesquim, a civil parish in the municipality of Lajes do Pico, island of Pico

In the archipelago of Madeira:

- Calheta, Madeira, municipality on the island of Madeira
  - Arco da Calheta, a civil parish in the municipality of Calheta
  - Calheta, a civil parish in the municipality of Calheta
  - Estreito da Calheta, a civil parish in the municipality of Calheta
