= Caminho Real do Paul do Mar =

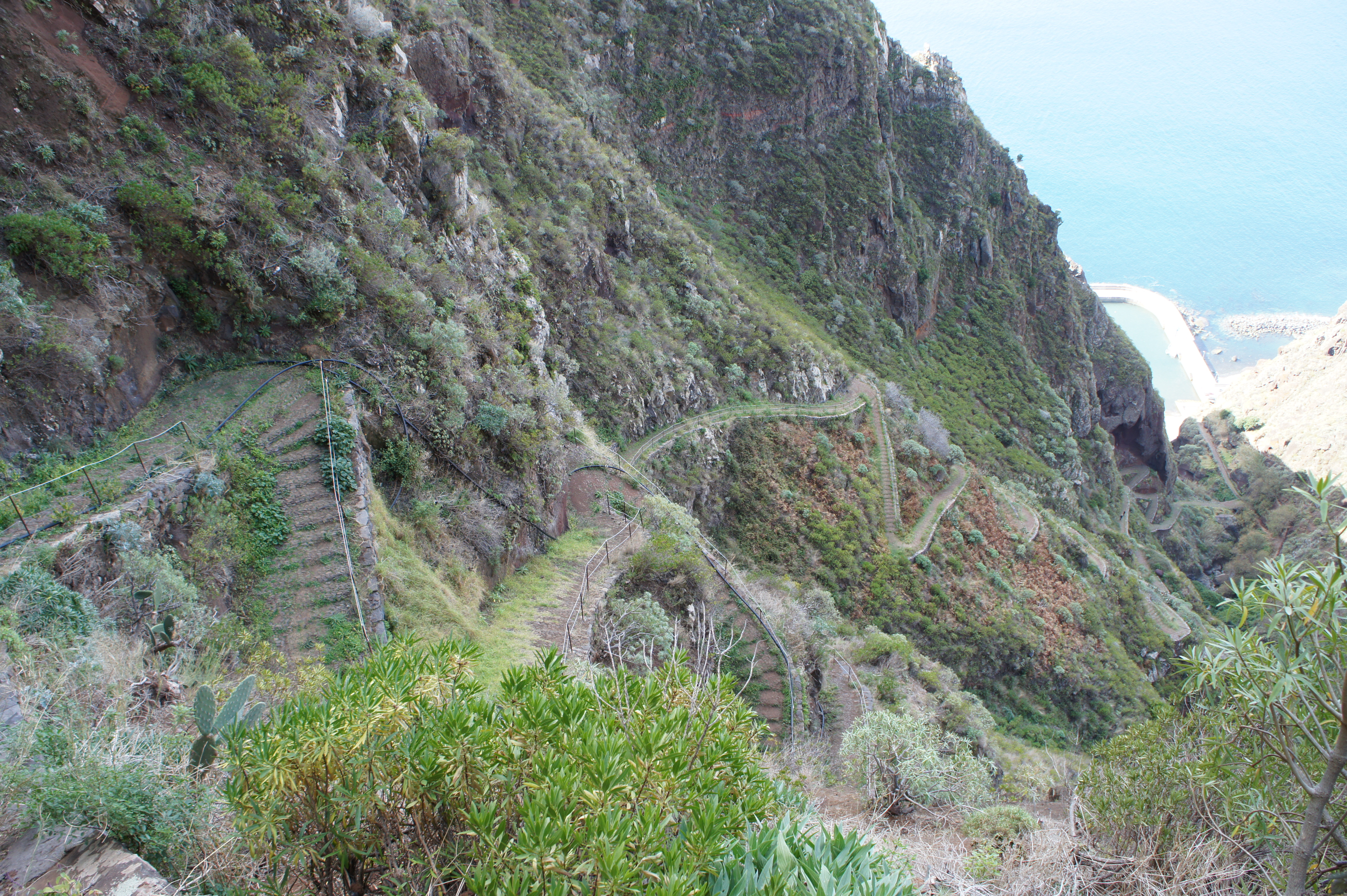
- Caminho Real
- Length: 1.8 km (1.1 mi)
- Location: Paul do Mar, Madeira, Portugal
- Designation: Nature Trail
- Highest point: 535 m (1,755 ft)
- Lowest point: 35 m (115 ft)
- Difficulty: Moderate
- Season: All year
- Waymark: PR19

The Caminho Real do Paul do Mar (Royal Path of Paul do Mar) is a municipal trail in Paul do Mar, in the island of Madeira (Portugal). It is the first walking trail of the annual Madeira Walking Festival, which takes place in January. The trail starts from the village of Prazeres (535 metres (1,755 ft) altitude) 32.752483°N 17.217014°W, and goes down to Paul do Mar Harbour 32.75269°N 17.223827°W. It is about 2 kilometres (1 mi) long and takes up to 80 minutes to complete. During the walk the villages of Jardim do Mar and Paul do Mar are visible, waterfalls can be seen and flora such as Pride of Madeira (Echium nervosum) and Madeira mountain stock (Euphorbia piscatoria) can be viewed.

This trail is one of the historic “municipal paths” on Madeira. These paths were the only means of access to villages such as Paul do Mar before roads were built. Also, it was cheaper to use the path for transporting goods rather than bringing them by sea which was more expensive and dangerous when the sea was rough in winter. Nowadays Caminho Real is one of the official Madeira Islands Footpaths (PR19).
