= Paul do Mar =

- Civil parish
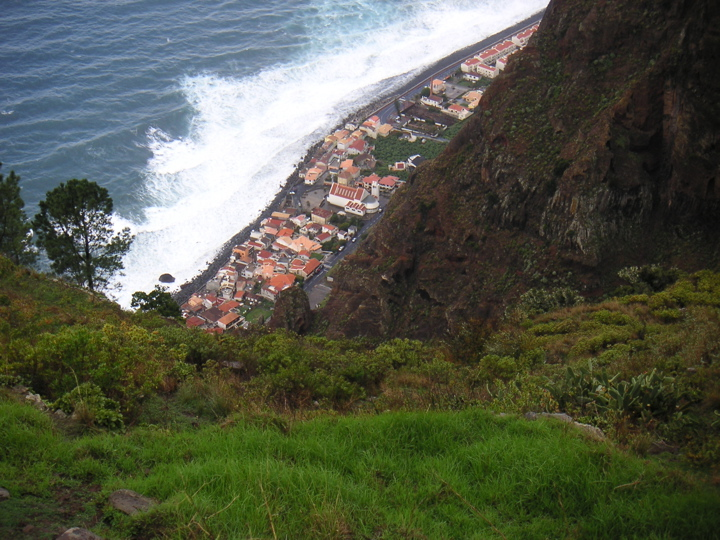
- The narrow band of Paúl do Mar, along the southwest corner of the island of Madeira

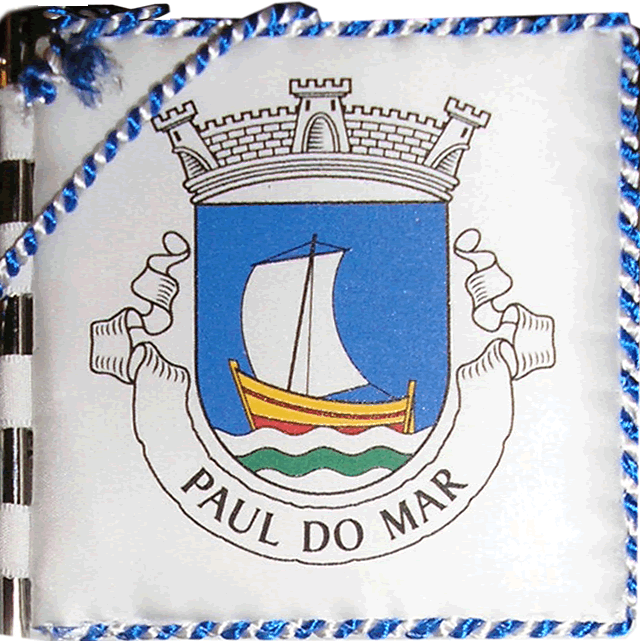
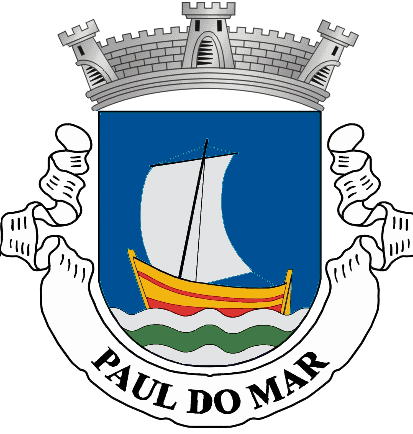
- Flag Coat of arms

- Location in Madeira
- Coordinates: 32°45′32″N 17°13′49″W
- Country: Portugal
- Auton. region: Madeira
- Island: Madeira
- Municipality: Calheta

Area
  - Total: 1.40 km^{2} (0.54 sq mi)
- Elevation: 16 m (52 ft)

Population (2011)
  - Total: 871
  - Density: 622/km^{2} (1,610/sq mi)
- Time zone: UTC+00:00 (WET)
  - Summer (DST): UTC+01:00 (WEST)
- Postal code: 9370-503
- Area code: 291
- Patron: Santo Amaro
- Website: www.pauldomar.pt.vu

Paul do Mar is a civil parish in the municipality of Calheta, in the Portuguese archipelago of Madeira. The population in 2011 was 871, in an area of 1.40 km^{2}.

== History ==
The origin of the toponymy paul do mar is linked to its geographic position, since paul refers to an elongated zone, which is justified by the parish's location along the southwest coast of Madeira. Its exposure to the ocean, and historical periods when the sea bathed the area with seawater, once characterised the area as the Sitio da Lagoa or Alagoa (English: site of the lake or the lake). Historically, the area experienced flooding from the sea when the Atlantic submerged and inundated fields to a depth of one metre. As a result, a salt factory was established. But, this was closed long ago. Since the construction of a new higher sea wall and ocean front with road and parking the sea flooding has stopped.

Paul do Mar's Catholic Church is dedicated to the patron saint of the village Santo Amaro.

== Geography ==
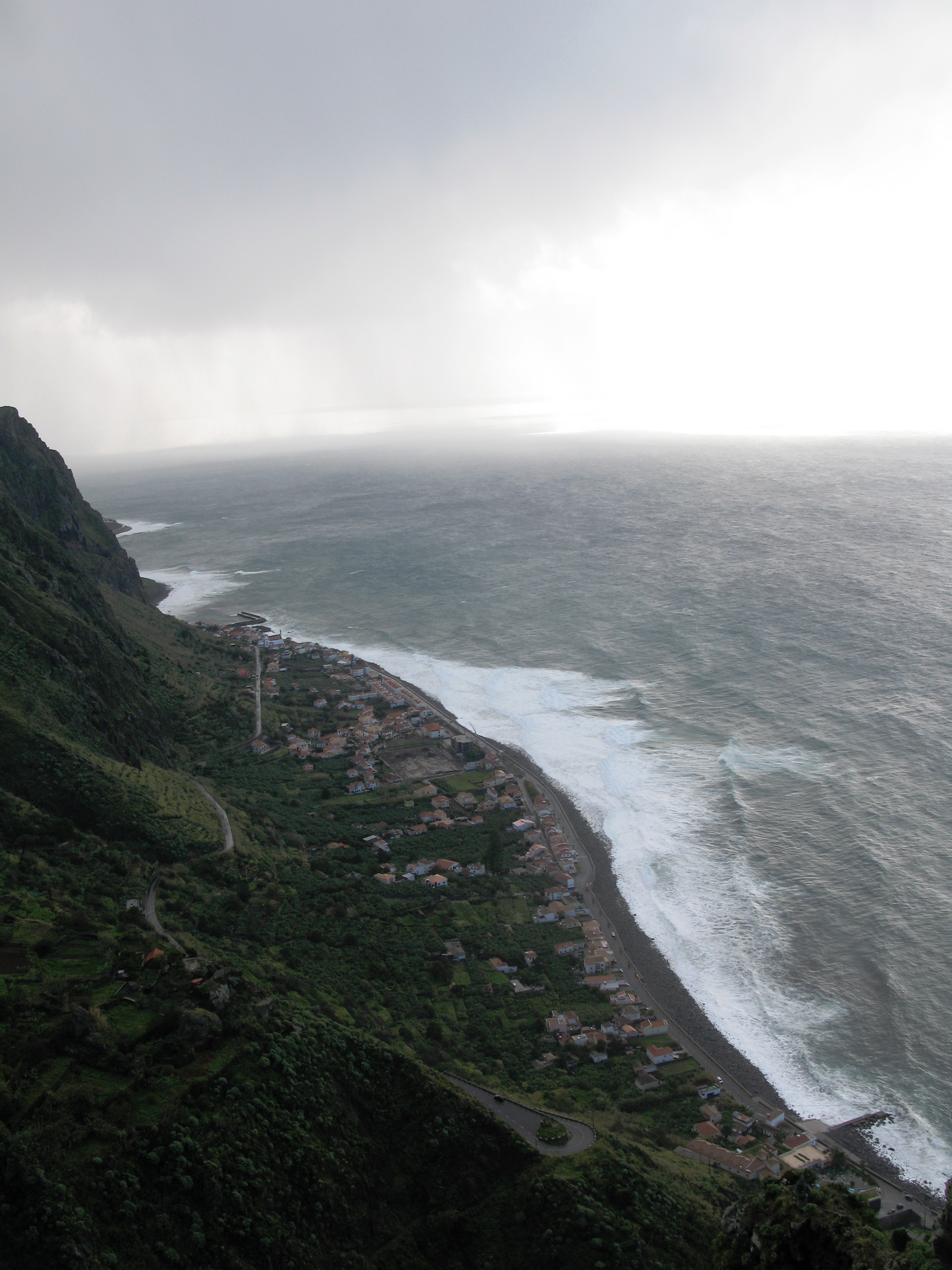
The rough ocean waves along the seaside of the parish of Paul do Mar

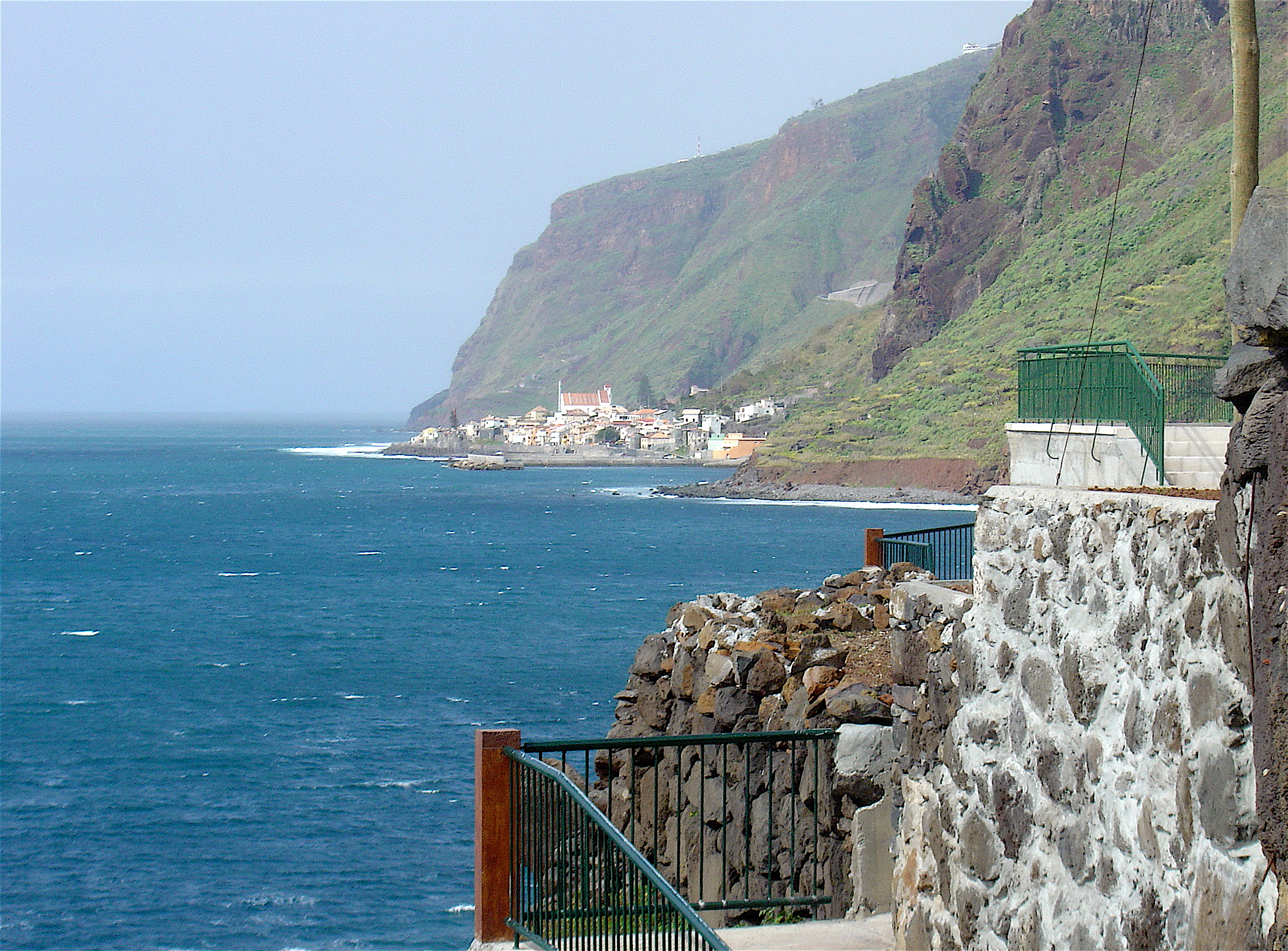
Paul do Mar as seen from the neighbouring parish of Jardim do Mar

Paul do Mar is accessible by two roads: one connecting the parish with Porto Moniz, Santana, Calheta and Funchal to the east, and another which connects the village to Fajã da Ovelha and Jardim do Mar, along the Atlantic Ocean. It is located about 3 km from the urbanized area of Calheta and about 1 km from Fajã da Ovelha. Calheta has an important art centre (Portuguese: Casa das Mudas) and many of the typical facilities that you would expect in a small village. The historic municipal pedestrian way Caminho Real connects Paúl do Mar with Prazeres. During low tide and when the sea is not too rough, it is possible to walk along the rocky beach to Jardim do Mar.

The parish is divided into five localities:

- Igreja - the most elevated part of the parish, and the smallest, it is primarily important for being the location of the parochial church and cemetery, which substituted the older chapel that was destroyed to make way for the new building. This event created some consternation in the community, which regarded the older church with pride. It had a large collection of imagery that was routinely exchanged with other parishes. Among other noteworthy buildings are the vestiges of the historical salting industry (mainly the chimneys from the factory) and an older fountain (built in 1889);
- Lagoa - receiving its name from the fact that the area is fairly flat and suspectible to ocean swells, the area of Lagoa was regularly flooded by ocean waves during winter storms until the new sea coastal defence system was built. The largest of the localities within Paul do Mar is Espanha. It is located in the centre of the parish, occupying an important centre of activities, including the locations of the health centre and main primary school, in addition to the municipal football field;
- Quebrada - The most easterly portion of the parish, the toponymic name originates from a landslide long ago. Another area is the harbour (Porto) which remains an important part of the region's fishing industry (a Lota - fish registration centre, slipway and located in this area). Also, the Caminho Real that links Paul do Mar with Prazeres starts at the harbour and was once the parish's few land accesses to the rest of the island. Quebrada is the location of the parish seat, the Junta de Freguesia;
- Serrado da Cruz - This is a densely concentrated area of residential buildings along the main roadway, as well as being an area (along with Ribeira das Galinhas) noted for the cultivation of bananas. Historically, the area of Cruz was the site of the upper level primary school, which taught grades five to six (at times from fourth grade), but was abandoned due to lack of funding (as was the older seat of the Banda Municipal Paulense, the local philharmonic band). Similarly, a statue in memorial to Dr. João Maurício Abreudos Santos (who was a local personality), erected by dos amigos Pauleiros (English: from Paulense friends), and a local ceramic/handicraft business Cerâmica Artesanal are also important sites in this area;
- Ribeira das Galinhas - the name of most westerly part of the parish is derived from the ravine where many chickens were penned by local farmers who lived in the area. The area has the lowest populational density in the parish reflecting its use as agricultural land for planting/cultivation of bananas. It is linked to Fajã da Ovelha by a winding roadway that scales the western cliffs, referred to as the Caminho das 25 Voltas (English: road of the 25 turns), that at one time began at a partly ruined bridge. Historically, this area was also the transit point for goods that were transferred from the cliff-tops to the seaside community.

Sport is popular, and football clubs include the Paulense (representing the locality of Ribeira das Galinhas, Serrado da Cruz and Lagoa) and the Santo Amaro club (which represented the localities of Igreja and Quebrada).

== Economy ==
The main activity in Paul do Mar and its area is fishing and agriculture, particularly the cultivation of banana and tourism including eco-tourism activities such as dolphin and whalewatching.

Paul do Mar has significant commercial businesses for a village, including shops, a small supermarket, bars, cafes, restaurants, a patisserie/bakery, a main primary school, Catholic church, a health centre, a bank, a football ground, a four-star hotel, and a number of self-catering holiday houses and apartments.

== Architecture ==
- Forte de Santo António do Paul do Mar (English: Fort of Saint Anthony) - Constructed in 1754, a provision of the 1761 Counsel of War (Portuguese: Conselho de Guerra), that also raised the annual income of the King's representative by including a barrel of wine.

In the story "Tribos da Madeira", the French claim the abandoned parish for themselves after failing to subjugate the Dutch tribe of Orania-Sea in neighbouring Jardim do Mar. An outpost is established in the Ribeira das Galinhas area, which is later abandoned after they leave and head for Fajã da Ovelha and Prazeres.

== Culture ==
There are many festas in the village throughout the year particularly in the summer months including the festa celebrating the Patron Saint of the village Santo Amaro from 14 to 15 January and The Festa da Lapa (the festival of the shellfish/limpets) which lasts from a Friday to a Sunday night in the month of July.

== Sport ==
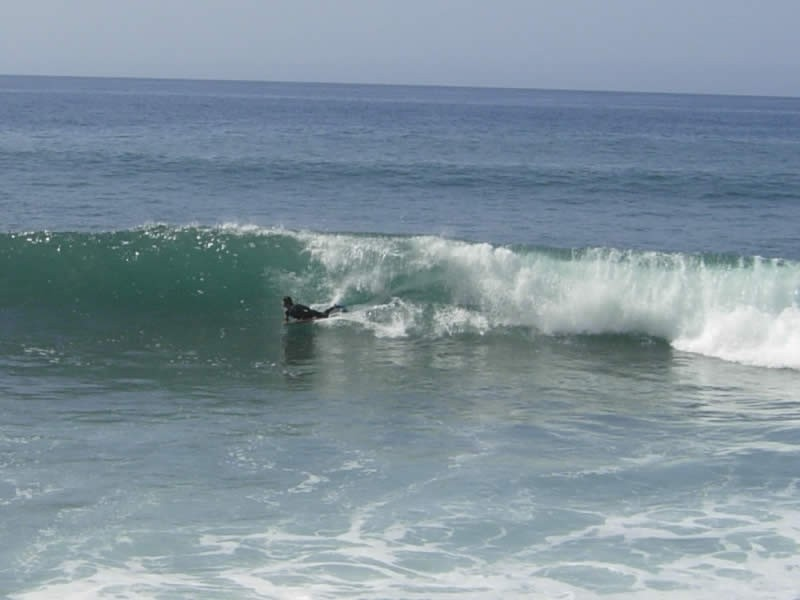
The beach in Paul do Mar was selected as one of the venues for the World Surfing Championships in 2001

The waves break large and surfing is enjoyed here by experienced surfers. In 2001 Paul do Mar was one of the venues for the World Surfing Championships.

== Notable citizens ==
- Dr. João Maurício Abreu dos Santos (17 September 1905 - 11 May 1969), medical doctor/practitioner; he completed his medical course at the University of Coimbra in 1935, and provided local health care and treatment to the Paulense residents, at a time where he was courted by many in the city of Funchal. He was memorialized for his local contribution to the local community with a statue in his honour in Serrado da Cruz.
- Dr. João Maurício Batista Abreu dos Santos (9 April 1947 – 25 July 2002), medical doctor/surgeon; son of Dr. João Maurício Abreu dos Santos, he also followed his father into medicine, and likewise earned respect regionally for his contributions to the local population. His practice provided weekly consultation to the population, in addition to the communities in Calheta, including specifically Prazeres;
- António Coito, merchant; proprietor of one of the largest stores in Paul do Mar, who was also a dedicated musician, master of the Banda Municipal Paulense for many years and member of Paul do Mar choral;
- João Correiro - an influential businessman, who had a store, responsible for mail delivery and a boat that made regularly shipments of people and goods to Funchal;
- Vasco da Gama Rodrigues (27 January 1909 – 3 May 1991), poet; studied at the Funchal lyceum, until moving to Mozambique, before returning to Portugal, where he worked for the public administration, as tourist inspector at the age of 25, at the same time authoring several works of poetry, including: Os Atlantes (1961), As Três Taças(1972) and O Cristo das Nações (1995).
