= Estreito =

Estreito may refer to the following places:

== Brazil ==
- Estreito (Maranhão), a municipality in the State of Maranhão
- Estreito, Florianópolis, a neighbourhood of Florianópolis, State of Santa Catarina
- Estreito, Goiás, a district of the municipality of Jataí, State of Goiás

== Portugal ==
- Estreito (Oleiros), a civil parish in the municipality of Oleiros
- Estreito da Calheta, a civil parish in the municipality of Calheta, Madeira
- Estreito de Câmara de Lobos, a civil parish in the municipality of Câmara de Lobos, Madeira
