= Prazeres =

Prazeres (Portuguese meaning "pleasures") may refer to the following places in Portugal:

- Prazeres, Madeira, a parish in the municipality of Calheta, Madeira Islands, Portugal
- Prazeres (Lisbon), a parish in the municipality of Lisboa, Portugal
