= Max Römer =

German painter (1878–1960)

Max Wilhelm Römer
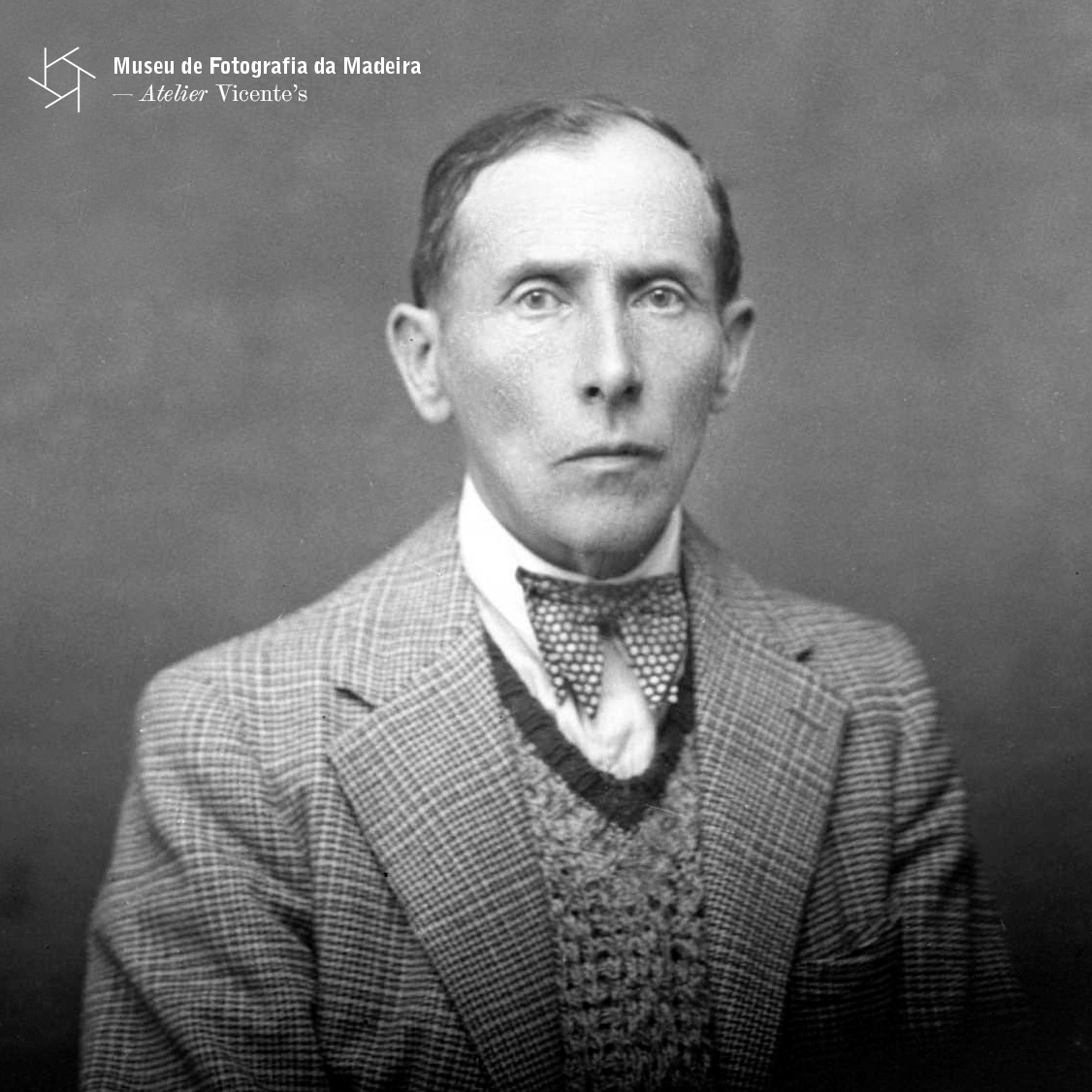
- Born: 22 November 1878; Hamburg, German Empire
- Died: 18 August 1960 (aged 81); Funchal, Portugal
- Relatives: Carl Heinrich Wilhelm (father); Maria Sophia Catharina (mother); Louise Kätchen (wife)

Max Wilhelm Römer (22 November 1878 — 18 August 1960) was a German painter known for his numerous paintings of the Portuguese Madeira Island, where he lived part of his life.

== Life ==
Römer was born in 1878 to Carl Heinrich Wilhelm and Maria Sophia Catharina Römer. He was baptised on 25 December 1879 in St. Peter's Church, Hamburg. On 24 May 1902 he married Louise Kätchen Parizot, who he met earlier in the company "Ledertechnik Holbe". Together they had five children (Max, Rolf Reinhold, Anita, Valeska Melati), one of which died already eight days after the birth.

He served in the military during World War I, from 1915 to 1918, and he saw action at Champagne, Somme, Romania, Greece and Macedonia.

After his wife fell ill, in 1922, he decided to move to Madeira due to the climate and the recommendation of a Danish friend. There he made numerous watercolor paintings of the typical life and landscape of the island. Additionally, he created advertising posters including some for hotels and ceremonies. From 15 March to 30 November 2013 the Mudas Centre for the Arts (now Mudas Contemporary Art Museum) presented an exhibition of Römer's work in Calheta, Madeira.

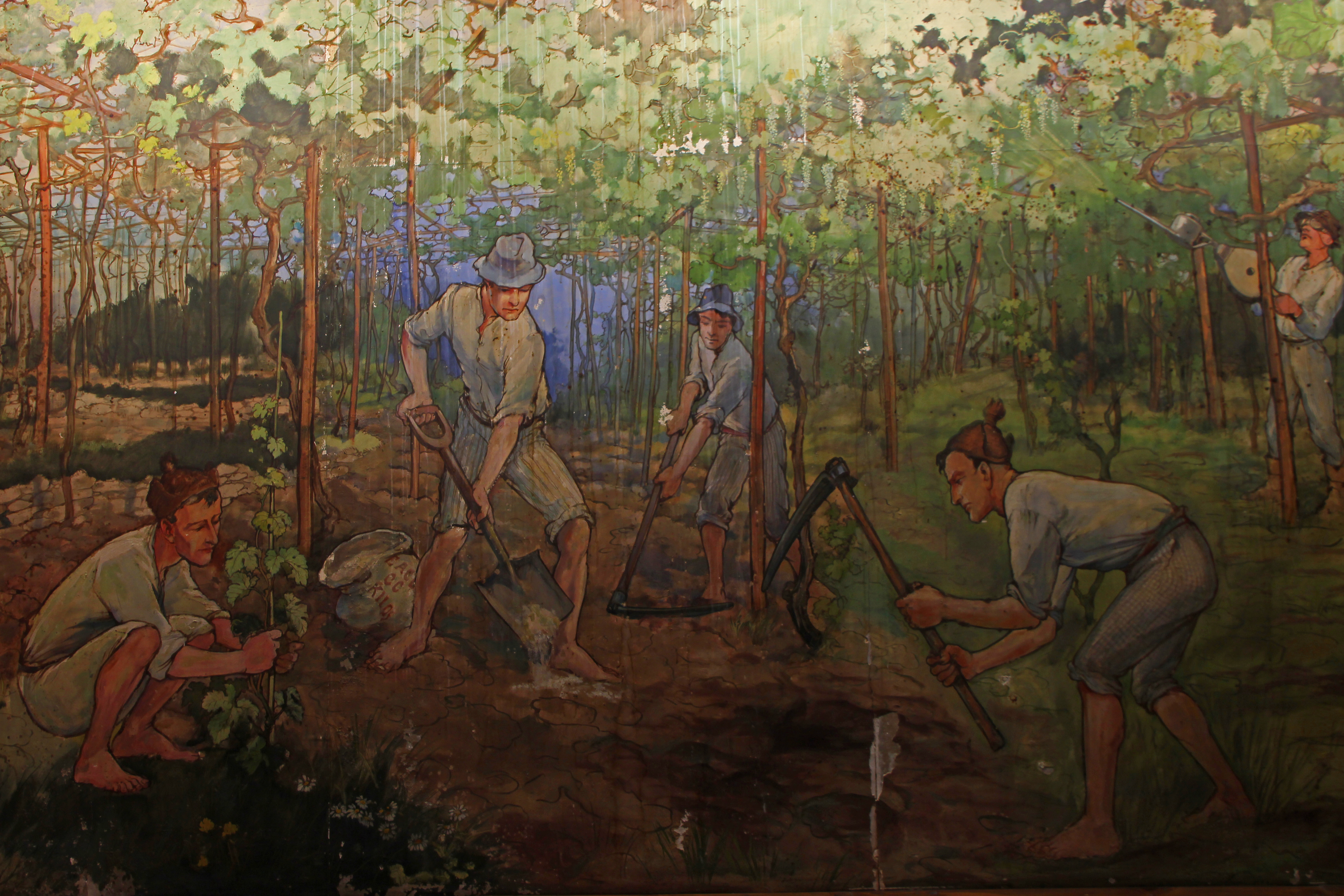
"Tending the Vines" by Max Römer, c. 1925
