= Praia da Calheta =

Beach in Calheta, Madeira, Portugal

- Beach
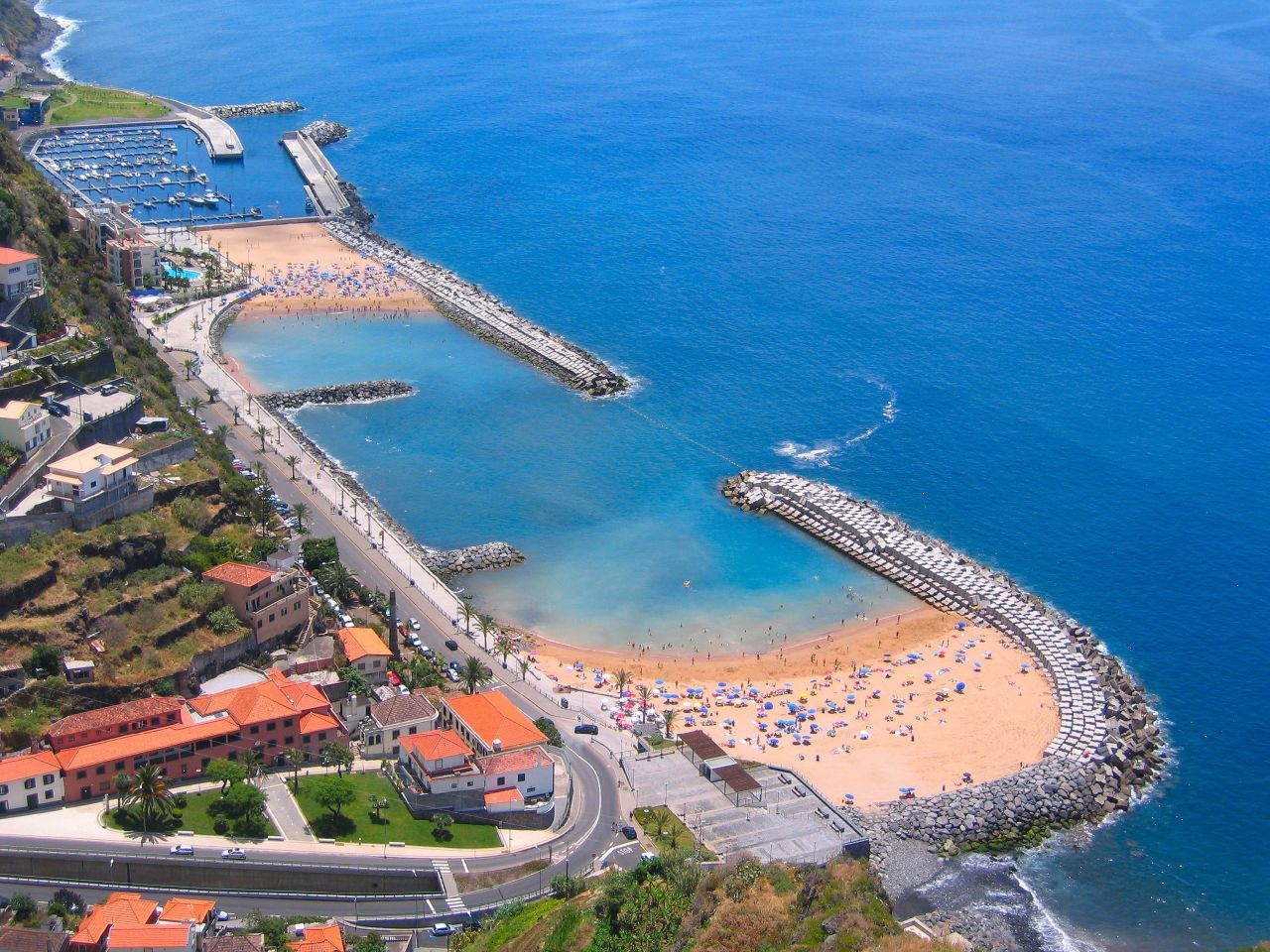
- The manufactured coastal beach of Calheta

- Location within Madeira
- Coordinates: 32°43′08″N 17°10′28″W
- Location: Calheta, Madeira, Portugal

Dimensions
  - Length: 100 m (330 ft)

Praia da Calheta (English: Calheta Beach) is a beach located near the town Calheta, on the island of Madeira, Portugal.

It is one of the few sandy beaches of Madeira, with sand imported from North Africa. However, these sand-imports were quite controversial, as the sand was taken from Western Sahara, a Non-Self Governing Territory which has been largely occupied by Morocco since 1975. The imports are considered to be a violation of international law, as the consent of the people of the territory is required in the exploitation of the territory’s resources.

The Madeira officials have neglected to consult the Sahrawi people on the sand purchases and instead opted to engage in business with Morocco. The latest confirmed shipments from occupied Western Sahara to Calheta took place in 2010.
