= Prazeres, Madeira =

Prazeres
- Civil parish
- Location in Madeira
- Coordinates: 32°45′4″N 17°12′16″W
- Country: Portugal
- Auton. region: Madeira
- Island: Madeira
- Municipality: Calheta
- Established: Settlement: fl. 1600; Parish: 18 December 1676

Area
  - Total: 10.03 km^{2} (3.87 sq mi)
- Elevation: 635 m (2,083 ft)

Population (2011)
  - Total: 704
  - Density: 70.2/km^{2} (182/sq mi)
- Time zone: UTC+00:00 (WET)
  - Summer (DST): UTC+01:00 (WEST)
- Postal code: 9370-602
- Area code: 291

Prazeres (English: pleasures) is a civil parish in the municipality of Calheta in the Portuguese archipelago of Madeira. The population in 2011 was 704, in an area of 10.03 km^{2}. Prazeres is located along the main Regional 222 Roadway, linking it to Fajã da Ovelha and Estreito da Calheta. Agriculture continues to be the driving activity in the region, although commercial establishments are scattered within the community.

== History ==
The name for the parish developed due to the existence of a small chapel in the area before the creation of the parish, dedicated to Nossa Senhora dos Prazeres (English: Our Lady of Pleasures). The reference to pleasure came from local references to an area that captivated the senses and the areas symbiosis with earthly pleasures. Historically a part of Estreito da Calheta, this region became independent, along with some homes in Fajã da Ovelha on 18 December 1676.

== Geography ==
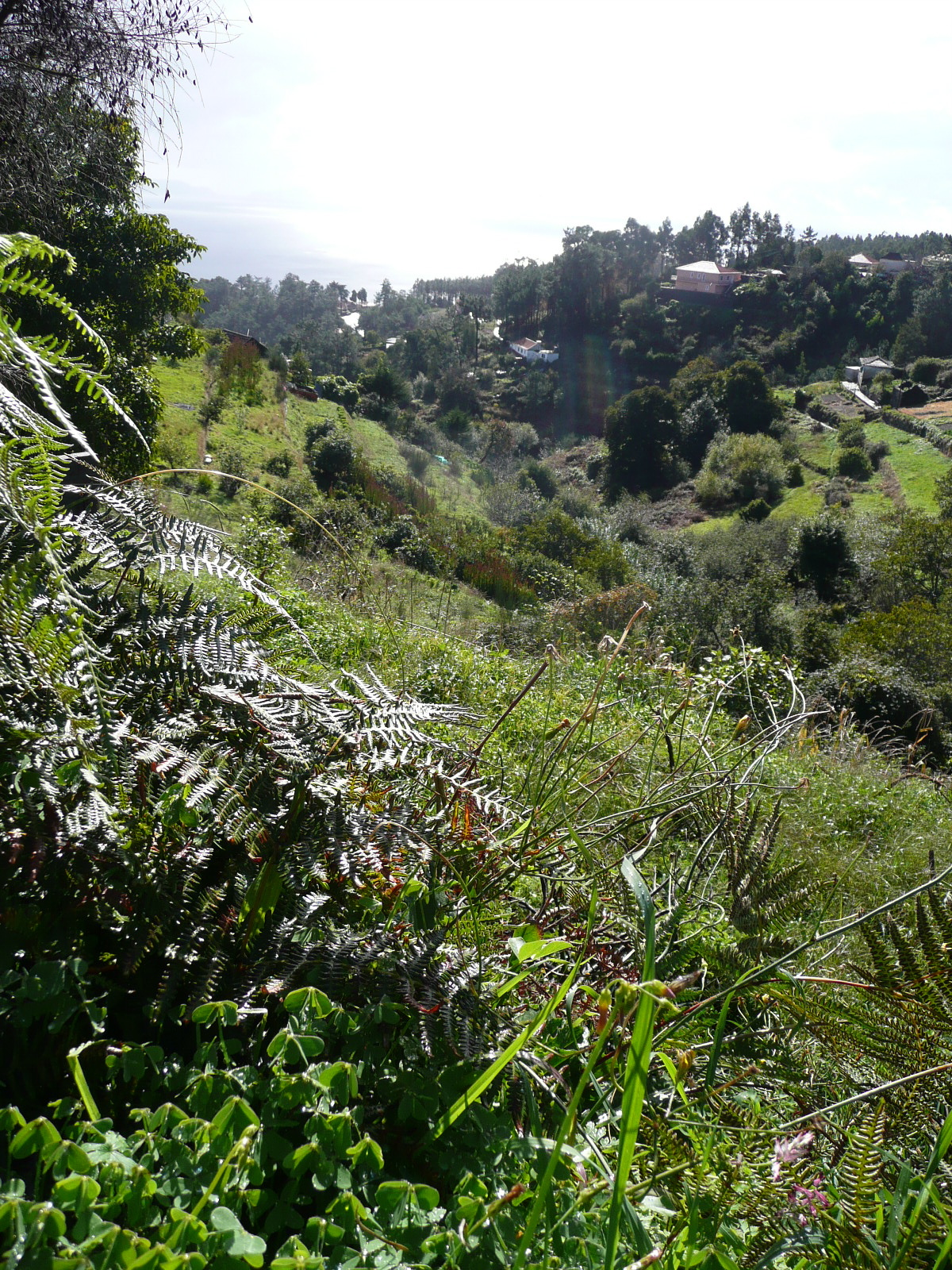
Perspective of the parish of Prazeres from the levada along the valley

Prazeres is central parish within the municipality of Calheta, juxtopositioned between Estreito da Calheta and Fajã da Ovelha. Physically, it extends from the edge of the escarpment overlooking the Atlantic Ocean into the interior to the Serra do Paul. In addition, upon reaching its pinnacle in the interior (1276 metres) the border continues down the river-valley of the Ribeira da Janela. Most of the community, the built-up residential, commercial and productive buildings of the parish, are located on a main promontory overlooking the fajã (coastal debris field) of the parish of Jardim do Mar. Similarly, this area is the primary agricultural lands accessed by ancillary roads that extend almost to the edge of the cliffs. Starting in the area of the Regional Roadway 222 the terrain is more inclined, and forested until reaching the Serra do Paul.

== Culture ==
The Clube Desportivo e Recreativo dos Prazeres (English: Sports and Recreational Club of Prazeres) is the local sports association, supporting athletes in many different areas (such as Futsal, badminton, gymnastics and/or athletics). The Sports Club is located in the eastern part of the parish, along with the main athletic field and air conditioned sports pavilion.

The Caminho Real, one of the official Madeira Islands Footpaths (PR19) starts in Prazeres and leads to Paul do Mar.

The parish has seven restaurants, serving typical traditional delicacies (such as cod) or other customary foods, such as Italian pizzas, lasagnas or pasta dishes. A popular drink, Poncha da Madeira, is a traditional liqueur drink made from lemon or orange brandy, and common in many of these restaurants.
