= Farol da Ponta do Pargo =

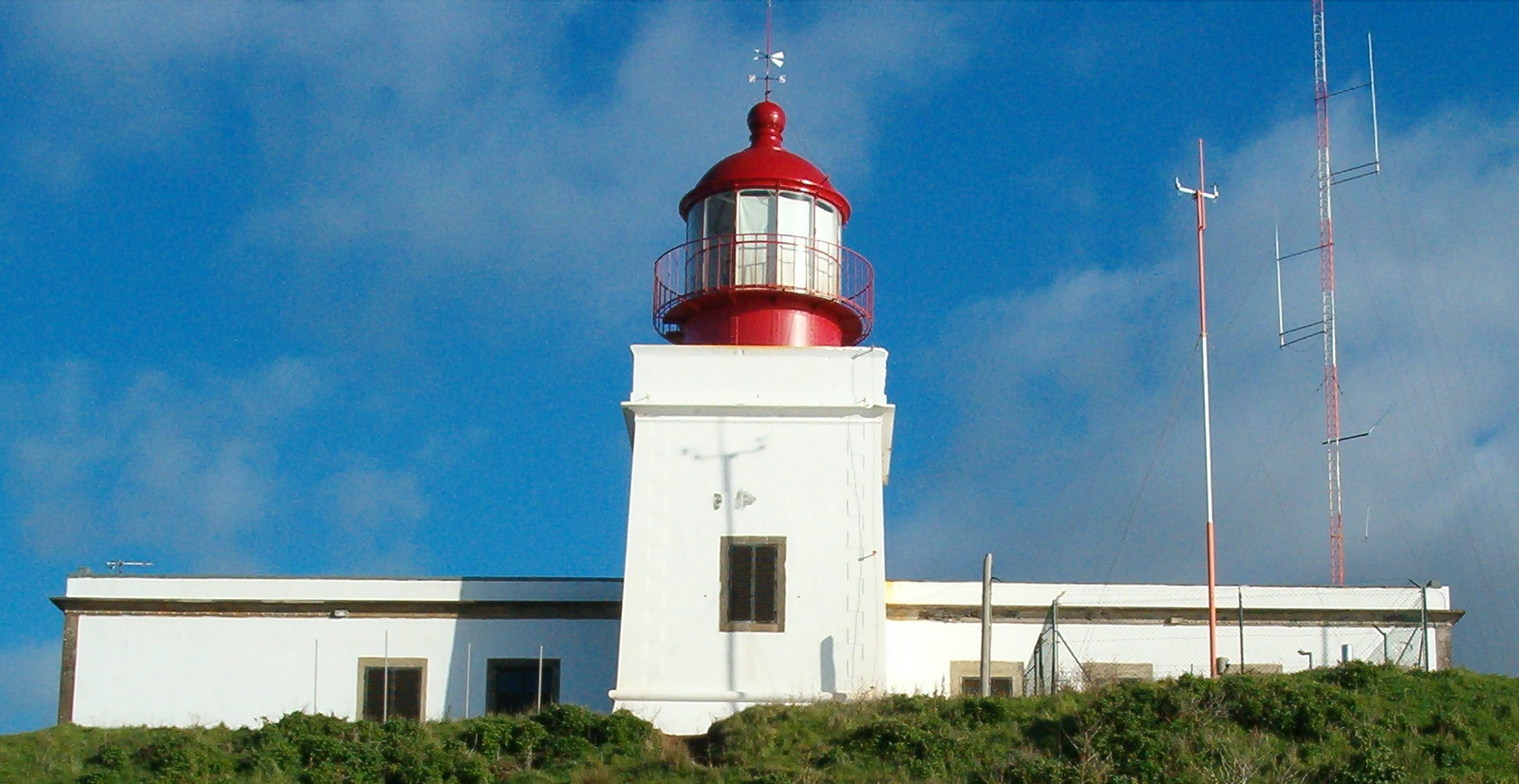
- Ponta do Pargo Lighthouse
- Location: Ponta do Pargo; Madeira; Portugal
- Coordinates: 32°48′50.0″N 17°15′45.3″W

Tower
- Constructed: 1922
- Construction: concrete tower
- Height: 14 metres (46 ft)
- Shape: cylindrical tower with 8 ribs with balcony and lantern
- Markings: grey-white unpainted tower, red lantern roof and rail
- Power source: mains electricity
- Heritage: Immovable Cultural Heritage of Municipal Interest, Proposto a Imóvel de Interesse Público

Light
- Focal height: 312 metres (1,024 ft)
- Lens: second order Fresnel lens
- Range: 26 nmi (48 km; 30 mi)
- Characteristic: Fl(3) W 20s

The Farol da Ponta do Pargo is an active lighthouse located in Ponta do Pargo, Madeira, Portugal. The lighthouse was built in 1922 on top of Ponta Vigia, a rocky cliff escarpment and has a focal height of 312 metres. In 2018 15,301 people visited the lighthouse.

== See also ==
- List of lighthouses in Portugal
