= Ponta do Pargo =

- Civil parish
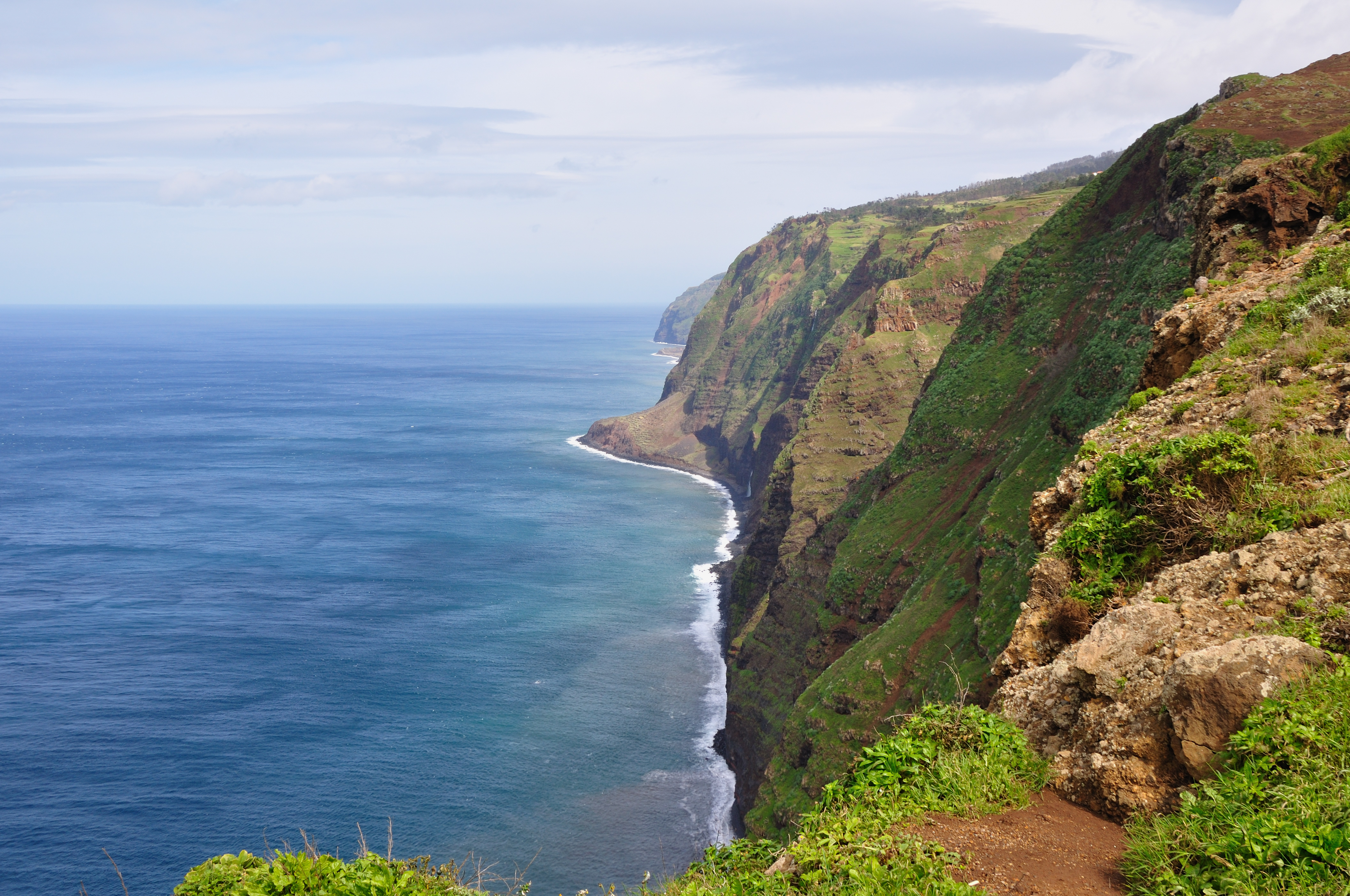
- Coast of Ponta do Pargo; a cliff-top escarpment extending into the North Atlantic from Lombada Velha

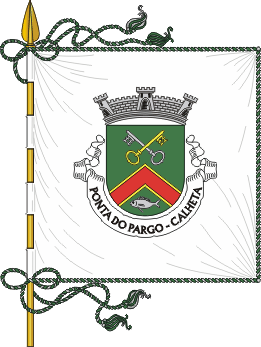
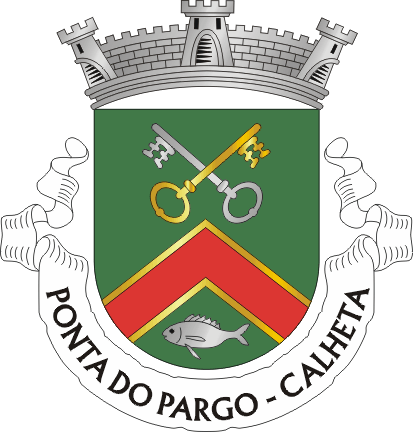
- Flag Coat of arms

- Location in Madeira
- Coordinates: 32°48′41″N 17°14′52″W
- Country: Portugal
- Auton. region: Madeira
- Island: Madeira
- Municipality: Calheta
- Established: Parish: 4 March 1560; Civil parish: 26 June 1851

Area
  - Total: 24.71 km^{2} (9.54 sq mi)
- Elevation: 447 m (1,467 ft)

Population (2011)
  - Total: 909
  - Density: 36.8/km^{2} (95.3/sq mi)
- Time zone: UTC+00:00 (WET)
  - Summer (DST): UTC+01:00 (WEST)
- Postal code: 9385-238
- Area code: 291
- Patron: São Pedro

Ponta do Pargo is a civil parish in the municipality of Calheta in the Portuguese island of Madeira. The population in 2011 was 909, in an area of 24.71 km^{2}. It is located west of the municipal seat of Calheta, and southwest of the municipality of Porto Moniz.

== History ==
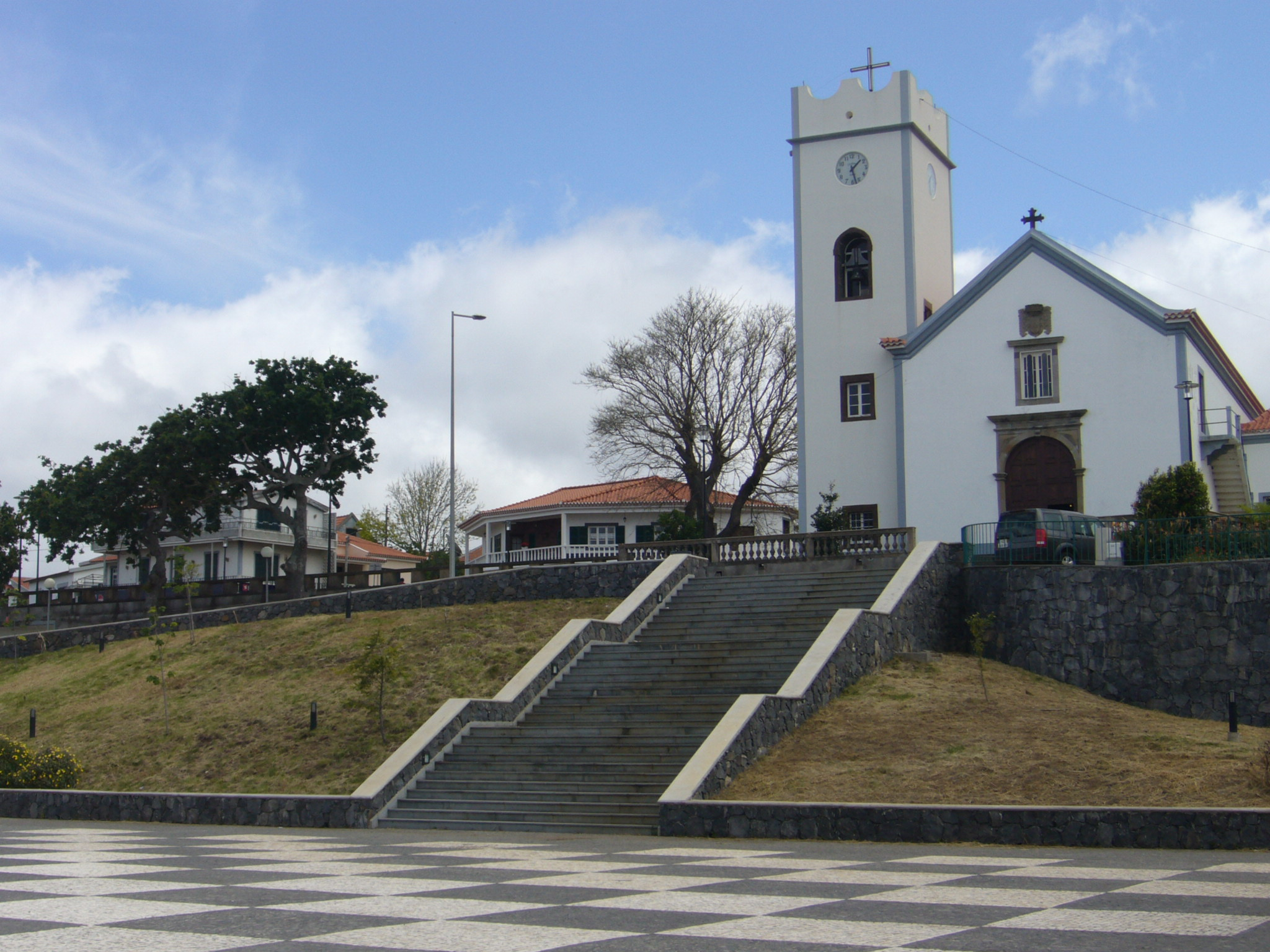
The parochial Church of Saint Peter located in the area of Salão, and across from the Civic Centre complex

The name of the parish, as the historian Gaspar Frutuoso explained, came from early explorers to the western tip of the island of Madeira, whom fished the waters and caught a species of porgy.

"From Calheta the captain passed below an area that ended at a point over the sea...and being here, they collected from the boat of Tristão and the boat of Álvaro Afonso a fish that looked like porgy, of a marvellous greatness and the largest that, until that time, was ever seen; for this reason, because of the fish, the point was named porgy. From this Ponta do Pargo look to the North until another point, whose distance one says is two, other say three, leagues..."

The settlement began with Garcia da Câmara, son-in-law of João Gonçalves Zarco, who here began establishing small estates run by colonists who tilled the land. Many of the lands in the parish were originally in the name of Garcia da Câmara and Afonso Henriques, Master of Alcáçovas (dated to the 16th century). The date for the creation of the parish remains a mystery. In the opinion of Father Fernando Augusto da Silva, it occurred in the late 1560s, since the regal document on 4 March of the same year referred to the congregation of this parish. Meanwhile, the lands of the civil parish pertained, at the time, to the neighbouring parish of Fajã da Ovelha.

The parish of Ponta do Pargo was incorporated into the municipality of Porto Moniz, between 31 October 1835 and 1849, until that municipality was suppressed during the administrative reforms of the Liberal regime. Porto Moniz, along with Ponta do Pargo, therefore began to function as a part of the much larger municipality of Calheta. The restoration of the municipality of Porto Moniz in 1855, resulted in the reincorporation of the parish of Ponta do Pargo. On 26 June 1851, Ponta do Pargo was deannexed from Porto Moniz and reintegrated into the municipality of Calheta (as it remains today).

Owing to the extreme geology of the western coast, with its cliffs and rocky coast, a lighthouse was constructed in the heights of Ponta da Vigia, at the extreme westerly promontory of the parish, inaugurated on 5 June 1922.

== Geography ==
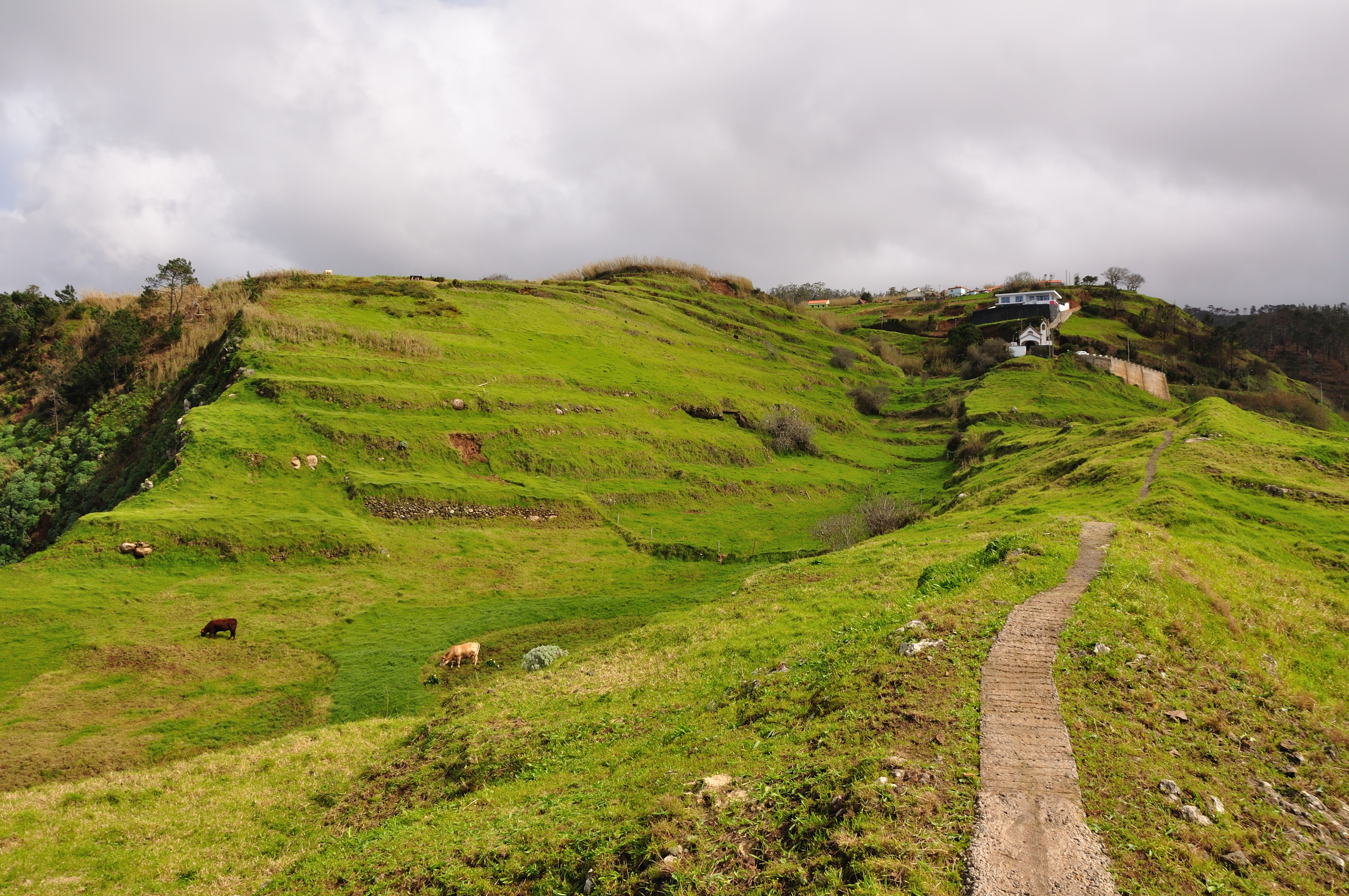
The escarpment of Lombada Velha seen from the trail near the clifftops

Ponta do Pargo is a diamond-shape territory on the western edge of the island Madeira. From its high-altitude cliffs it extends into the interior along escarpments cut by several river valleys to the Serra do Paul. The northwest to southwest border fronts the Atlantic Ocean, while its northern frontier is limited by its border with the municipality of Porto Moniz (Porto Moniz) and Fajã da Ovelha (within the municipality of Calheta. The cliff-top bluffs reach a height of 392 metres above sea level, while its interior extent reaches an altitude of just over 1321 metres. The most westerly extent, the Ponta in the parishes name, bears a lighthouse.

Ponta do Pargo is identified by several localities scattered throughout the central band of the regional roadway; residential agglomerations that include: Cabo, Lombada Velha, Ribeira da Vaca, Serrado, Salão, Corujeira de Dentro, Corujeira de Fora, Lombadinha, Amparo and Lombo.

About 20% of the inhabitants of the parish are children and youth (less than 15 years), 55% are active adults, while seniors make-up 25% of the population.

== Economy ==
Its main industry is agriculture, although it is supported by a vibrant commercial industry localized in the localities of Ponta do Pargo, Ribeira da Vaca and Lombada Velha. Agricultural production and support of dairy herding are the primary activities, which support the butter industry, but the area is known for a diverse cultivation of tubers and legumes, including sweet potato, carrots, wheat, grapes and apples. Civil construction is one of the most important activity economically, employing a large portion of the active population. Social services are provided by the Social Centre and Casa do Povo da Ponta do Pargo, including homecare and assistance, while healthcare services are provided by the local Health centre and that located in Calheta.

== Architecture ==
=== Civic ===
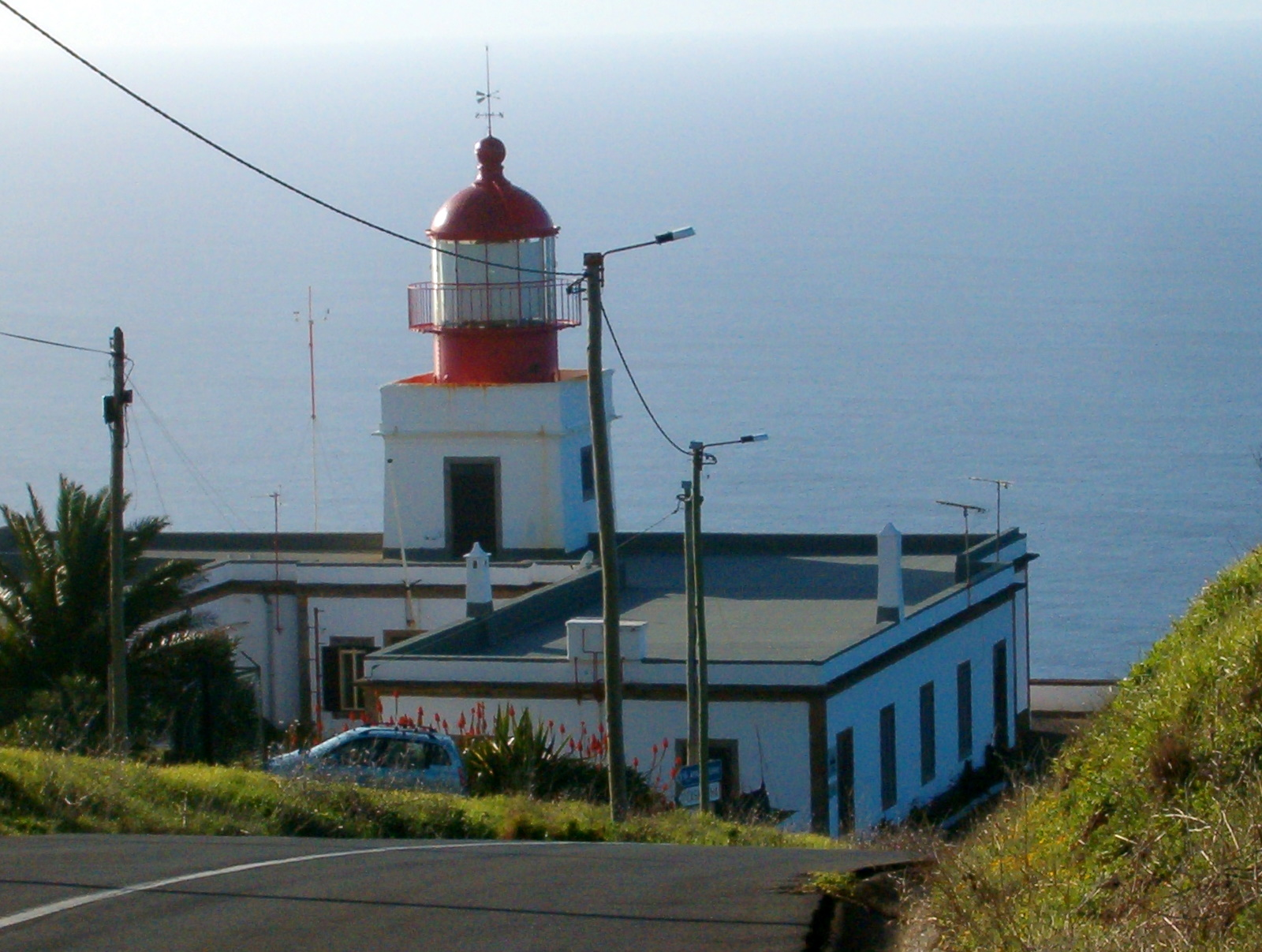
The iconic Ponta do Pargo Lighthouse located at the Ponta do Pargo escarpment

- Farol da Ponta do Pargo (English: Ponta do Pargo Lighthouse) - Located at Ponta Vigia, a rocky cliff escarpment (290 metres above sea level), the lighthouse was inaugurated in 1922, its silhouette has dominated the skyline of this escarpment. Its light is 312 metres above sea level, sometimes becoming enveloped by fog but an important signal for seafaring ships.
- Centro Cívico da Ponta do Pargo (English: Ponta do Pargo Civic Centre) - Built through investment of 8 million euros, it is located in front of the parochial church and was inaugurated on 13 September 2006. The modernist design houses the local Health centre, the Junta de Freguesia, Casa do Povo, Day Centre, Social Services and Social Security Centres, while an auxiliary building includes a gymnasium.

=== Religious ===
- Church of São Pedro (English: Church of Saint Peter) - Once a chapel dedicated to Saint Peter, it was expanded and remodelled, but reconstructed by order of the Conselho da Fazenda on 20 July 1620, and completed in 1690. In 1851, new works to repair the buildings were completed. Oral tradition indicates that the constructions and remodelling occurred in three different places within Salão (in Pé do Pico, later Achada da Igreja and finally in its present location), although no records provide dates for its original construction or these latter remodelling projects associated with the different locations.
- Chapel of Nossa Senhora do Amparo (English: Chapel of Our Lady of Amparo) - The ecclisastical parish of Amparo, created by the Bishop of Funchal, David de Sousa, in 1960, includes the civil parish of Ponta do Pargo, and the chapel was constructed in the 20th century in a simple modernist style.

== Culture ==
The patron saint of the parish is Saint Peter, in whose honour the inhabitants celebrate an annual festival each 29 June. Other religious celebrations are important throughout the parish, including the romeiras or processions that travel from church to church throughout the island, and annual celebrations at the churches of Nossa Senhora da Boa Morte (Cabo) in July and Nossa Senhora da Boa Viagem (Amparo) in August.

Non-secular highlights include primarily the Festival of the Pêro, an agricultural festival dedicated to the apple, held annually in September in the locality of Salão. Culturally, the parish is supported by a dynamic collectivity, the Associação Desportiva e Cultural da Ponta do Pargo (established on 16 July 1999) which promotes and develops sports activities in the parish. Similarly, the Grupo de Cantigas Norte a Sul da Ponta do Pargo gives collective support for the arts and music.
