= Sport in Portugal =

Sports in Portugal are important in Portuguese culture. High-profile, successful competitive athleticism and sportsmanship in Portugal can be traced back to the time of ancient Rome. Gaius Appuleius Diocles (104 – after 146 AD) was a noteworthy charioteer born in Lamego who became one of the most celebrated athletes in ancient history. He is often cited as the highest-paid athlete of all time. Football is the most popular sport in Portugal. Other than football, many other professional or semi-professional well organized sport competitions take place every season in Portugal, including basketball, swimming, athletics, tennis, gymnastics, futsal, rink hockey, team handball, volleyball, surfing, canoeing and rugby union championships among the hundreds of sports played in this country.

The major Portuguese professional sports leagues, championships and events include (in no particular order):

- Portuguese Football Championship, Cup of Portugal, Taça da Liga and Supertaça in football.
- Portuguese Futsal First Division in futsal.
- Portuguese Basketball League in basketball.
- Portuguese Roller Hockey First Division in rink hockey.
- Portuguese Handball League in handball.
- Campeonato Português de Rugby in rugby.
- Portuguese Volleyball League A1 in volleyball.
- Campeonato de Futebol de Praia in beach soccer.
- Volta a Portugal in cycling.
- Rally of Portugal in rallying.
- Race of Portugal in touring car racing.

Other popular sport-related recreational outdoor activities with thousands of enthusiasts nationwide include airsoft, golf, hiking, orienteering, and Bullfighting.

== Football ==
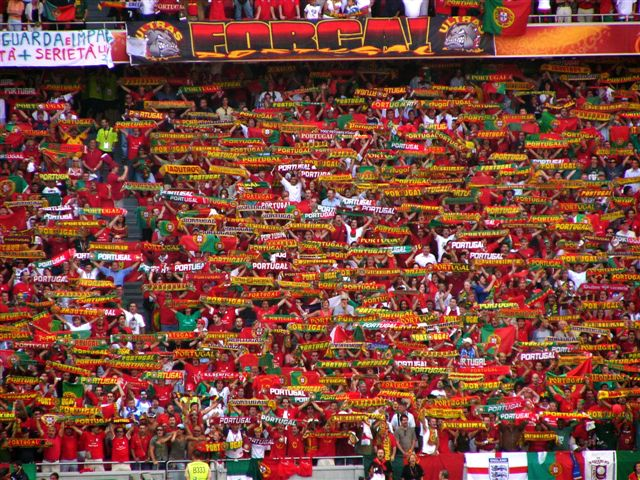
Portuguese football fans supporting the Portugal national football team

Football is the most popular sport in Portugal, and the country has produced footballers who became known worldwide. Players such as Eusébio, Luís Figo and Cristiano Ronaldo are the most noted Portuguese footballers. Portuguese football managers are also noteworthy, with the most notable one being José Mourinho at club level, and Fernando Santos at national team level.

The Portugal national football team is among the higher-rated national football teams in Europe and the world, having won one UEFA European Championship title in 2016 and two UEFA Nations League titles in 2019 and 2025. The Primeira Liga, the country's top professional league, is the most widely known sport events in the country, where football teams such as S.L. Benfica, FC Porto, and Sporting CP are the main contenders. Other important clubs are Belenenses and Boavista. These five clubs are the only ones to have become champions of the Portuguese league.

Portuguese football teams have performed well in the UEFA Champions League and UEFA Cup competitions, reaching regularly the last stages of those competitions and winning a number of trophies. Portugal has a large number of top football stadia. There are three UEFA 5 star stadia in Portugal along with many other featuring state of the art facilities which are distributed across the country.

== Futsal ==
Portugal national futsal team is one of the strongest teams in the world. The team now is ranked 5 of world ranking and having won 1 UEFA Futsal Euro in 2018.

The Portuguese futsal league is divided into divisions. The top teams play in the 1a Divisão. In each division, a team plays all other teams twice, once at home and once away, and 1a Divisão the final phase is played under the playoff system.

The Portuguese league teams compete in Europe under UEFA, most notably in the UEFA Futsal Cup. The teams also compete in a domestic cup competition each year, called the Portuguese Cup. The winners of the 1a Divisão play the winners of the Portuguese Cup in the Portuguese SuperCup.

Ricardinho, is also one of the best futsal players of all time getting the title of "Best Futsal Player in the World" for 4 times.

== Roller hockey ==
Portugal has a successful roller hockey team, with 15 World titles and 20 European titles, making it the country with the most wins in both competitions. The most successful Portuguese roller hockey teams in international competitions (in terms of overall titles) are Porto, Benfica (7), Sporting CP and Óquei de Barcelos (6).

== Athletics ==
Portugal has been traditionally strong in the sport of athletics in long distance running, and is the birthplace for a number of successful athletes including Rosa Mota, Carlos Lopes, Fernanda Ribeiro, and Manuela Machado. Rui Silva and sprinter Francis Obikwelu have won several gold, silver and bronze medals in European, World and Olympic Games competitions. Naide Gomes is a multiple World and European champion in the women's pentathlon and long jump events and Nelson Évora and Pedro Pichardo are Olympic champions in the triple jump. In the triathlon, Vanessa Fernandes has won a large number of medals and major competitions across the world, including the silver medal in the 2008 Beijing Olympics.

The country has a strong reputation in cross-country running: it hosts two of the world's foremost annual meetings (the Almond Blossom Cross Country and Oeiras International Cross Country), it has hosted the IAAF World Cross Country Championships twice, and Carlos Lopes and Albertina Dias are both former world champions of the sport.

== Basketball ==
For country's main basketball clubs are S.L. Benfica and FC Porto. Both teams have competed at several European cups in the past years. Portugal's national basketball team had its best performance at the 2007 EuroBasket where it left behind heavily favored competition such as Turkey and Serbia.

Besides the traditional 5x5 full court basketball, 3x3 Basketball has grown in popularity in Portugal since about the mid-2010s.

== Canoeing ==
Portugal became in the later years one of the most successful countries in this sport, winning many medals at European and world championships. The better athletes including Francisca Laia, Teresa Portela, Joana Vasconcelos, Helena Rodrigues, Beatriz Gomes, João Ribeiro, Emanuel Silva and Fernando Pimenta. These two athletes won the silver medal at 2012 Summer Olympics in London in the Men's K2 1000m event.

== Cycling ==
Cycling, with Volta a Portugal being the most important race, is also a popular sports event and include professional cycling teams such as S.L. Benfica, Boavista, Clube de Ciclismo de Tavira, and União Ciclista da Maia. Noted Portuguese cyclists include 2013 World Road Race Champion Rui Costa, as well as Joaquim Agostinho, Marco Chagas, José Azevedo, Sérgio Paulinho, and Tiago Machado.

== Golf ==
Golf was first introduced to Portugal in 1890 by Englishmen based in Porto, most of who were involved in wine exporting. The course was almost entirely of sand. The Skeffington Cup, named after the club's first president, is said to be the longest-running golf tournament in the world, going back to 1891. In 1900 a new course was established with grass. The new Oporto Golf Club is the third oldest golf club in mainland Europe. Portuguese were not invited to play until 1921. The first Portuguese member was Fernando Nicolau de Almeida, who later became the club's president. However, there remained few golf courses in Portugal until the age of jet travel opened the country to tourism. Three-time winner of the Open Championship, Sir Henry Cotton, was asked to design the first 18-hole course in the Algarve, near Portimão. There are now close to 90 courses in Portugal but golf remains a game played more by tourists and foreign residents than by Portuguese. At the beginning of 2002 there were no Portuguese in the top 200 male or female golfer rankings.

== Handball ==
The national team for men has emerged as a force to be reckoned with on the world stage. Its best results in the major tournaments, the Summer Olympics, the World Championship and the European Championship have all come during the 2020s, with fourth place at the 2025 World Championship being the highest final position.

== Martial arts ==
Martial arts like judo have also brought many medals to this country, namely Telma Monteiro who conquered gold twice at the European Championships in the −52 kg category and a bronze medal at the 2016 Summer Olympics, and Nuno Delgado who conquered the bronze medal in the 2000 Summer Olympics in Sydney, and became the European champion in 1999 (in Bratislava) and vice-champion in the year of 2003.

The country has an ancient martial art known as Jogo do Pau (Portuguese Stick Fencing), used for self-protection and for duels between young men in disputes over young women. Having its origin in the Middle Ages, Jogo do Pau uses wooden staves as a combat weapon.

In fencing, Joaquim Videira won the silver medal at the épée 2006 World Fencing Championships and has conquered numerous medals in the world cup.uku

In taekwondo, Rui Bragança and Júlio Ferreira won the gold medal at the 2016 European Taekwondo Championships in Switzerland on their categories and their both European champions. Bragança also won the gold medal at the 2015 European Games in Baku, Azerbaijan in the -58kg category. Later, Bragança went on the 2016 Summer Olympics placing ninth in the same category.

== Motorsports ==
Tiago Monteiro is the only Portuguese driver to have scored a Formula One podium finish (3° at the controversial 2005 United States Grand Prix) and Miguel Oliveira is the most successful Portuguese rider in MotoGP (Moto3 runner-up in 2015, Moto2 runner-up in 2018 and 5 wins at the Premier Class), Estoril and Algarve are the main race tracks in Portugal, it hosted events such as Formula 1, WEC, A1, MotoGP, WorldSBK, EWC, etc.

Portugal has great traditions in rallying with one of the most famous rally races in the world (Rally of Portugal). Also famous is the Ralall managers are also noteworthy, with ly Madeira. Off-road events (with the Baja Portugal 1000 and recently Lisboa-Dakar) also have international recognition. SATA RAlly Açores is part of the ERC.

== Olympics ==
In 1909, it became the 13th nation to join the Olympic Movement. Its inaugural competition came at the 1912 Summer Olympics, in Stockholm. With 21 consecutive appearances, it is ranked at 18th for attending Olympiads, as of the 2004 Summer Olympics. Its Olympic medals count stands at 22: 4 golds, 7 silvers and 11 bronzes.

Portugal's inaugural Winter Olympic Games competition came at the 1952 Winter Olympics, in Oslo. The interspersed attending of 5 Winter Olympics and having yet to achieve a Winter Olympics medal can be explained by its inadequate elevations and Mediterranean climate.

== Table tennis ==
Portugal has one of the best table tennis teams of the world. The team is composed by Marcos Freitas, Tiago Apolónia and João Pedro Monteiro. Portugal reached the quarter-finals at 2012 Summer Olympics in London, beating in the first round Great Britain and losing the quarter-finals against South Korea 2–3.

== Tennis ==
Tennis was first played in the early 1870s by British employees of the submarine cable company at Carcavelos, although proper courts only became available from around 1875. However, the cable station was an English enclave and so this had minimal impact on tennis development in the country. The Oporto Cricket and Lawn Tennis Club had three courts by 1877 but at that time all members were also British. The game's growth amongst Portuguese people was mainly due to those who had been to England, usually as students. The main credit goes to Guilherme Pinto Basto, who played at the elite Sporting Club of Cascais, which had courts by 1882. He gave lessons there, including to Prince D. Carlos, the future king, who would play in some of the club's tournaments. Pinto Basto became known as the father of Portuguese tennis. He was the first President of the Portuguese Lawn Tennis Federation, in 1925, and was still playing the game in 1950 at the age of 87. He organised regular international tournaments at Cascais and succeeded in attracting famous international players, such as Jean Borotra and Suzanne Lenglen.

Portugal Davis Cup team is an average team in tennis, competing between Europe Group I and Europe Group II. Nowadays is composed by João Sousa, Rui Machado, Frederico Gil, Pedro Sousa, Gastão Elias and Leonardo Tavares. The National Coach is Pedro Cordeiro. Every season the city of Estoril host the Portugal Open (formerly Estoril Open), competition won by some of the best tennis players of all time.

João Sousa was 28th in the world ranking in May 2016.

== Triathlon ==
Portugal has been involved in Triathlon at all levels. Most notable is the women's 2006–07 ITU Triathlon World Cup Champion Vanessa Fernandes. Portugal also has several strong male contenders in the current ITU Triathlon World Cup elite field, among them João Pedro Silva and João Pereira . At the Ironman distance Pedro Gomes won the 2013 Ironman Sweden 140.6 race, becoming the first Portuguese to win an Ironman distance event. Portugal also hosts the Lisbon triathlon a popular Olympic distance race.

== Water sports ==
The country has also achieved notable performances in sports like surfing, windsurfing, kitesurfing, kayaking, and sailing.

Manuel Centeno is also a major name in Portuguese sports as he conquered the National, European, and the World titles in 2006, in bodyboarding after being the European champion back in 2001.

In surfing, Frederico Morais has the best Portuguese rank in the WSL Championship Tour, has he got in 2017 the 14th position, in his rookie year. Vasco Ribeiro won the Men's Junior World Champions in 2014 and Teresa Bonvalot won the Women's Junior European Championships both in 2016 and 2017, she is also the highest-ranked Portuguese female ever on the Championship Tour after she got 20th in 2017.

In 2010, Portugal became one of the WSL Championship Tour official stops so every year the country hosts the MEO Rip Curl Pro Portugal in the supertubos beach in Peniche. Nazaré is a very popular surfing destination because of the very high breaking waves that form due to the presence of the underwater Nazaré Canyon. Numerous surfing records have been set there, including the Guinness World Record for the biggest wave ever surfed.

== Other ==
- Airsoft is played across the entire country.
- Equestrianism and Olympic shooting are also popular and have a reputation in Portugal, with many current and former law enforcement or military members adopting this sport.

== See also ==
- Portugal at the Olympics
- Portugal at the Paralympics
- Sport in Madeira
