= Fajã da Ovelha =

- Civil parish
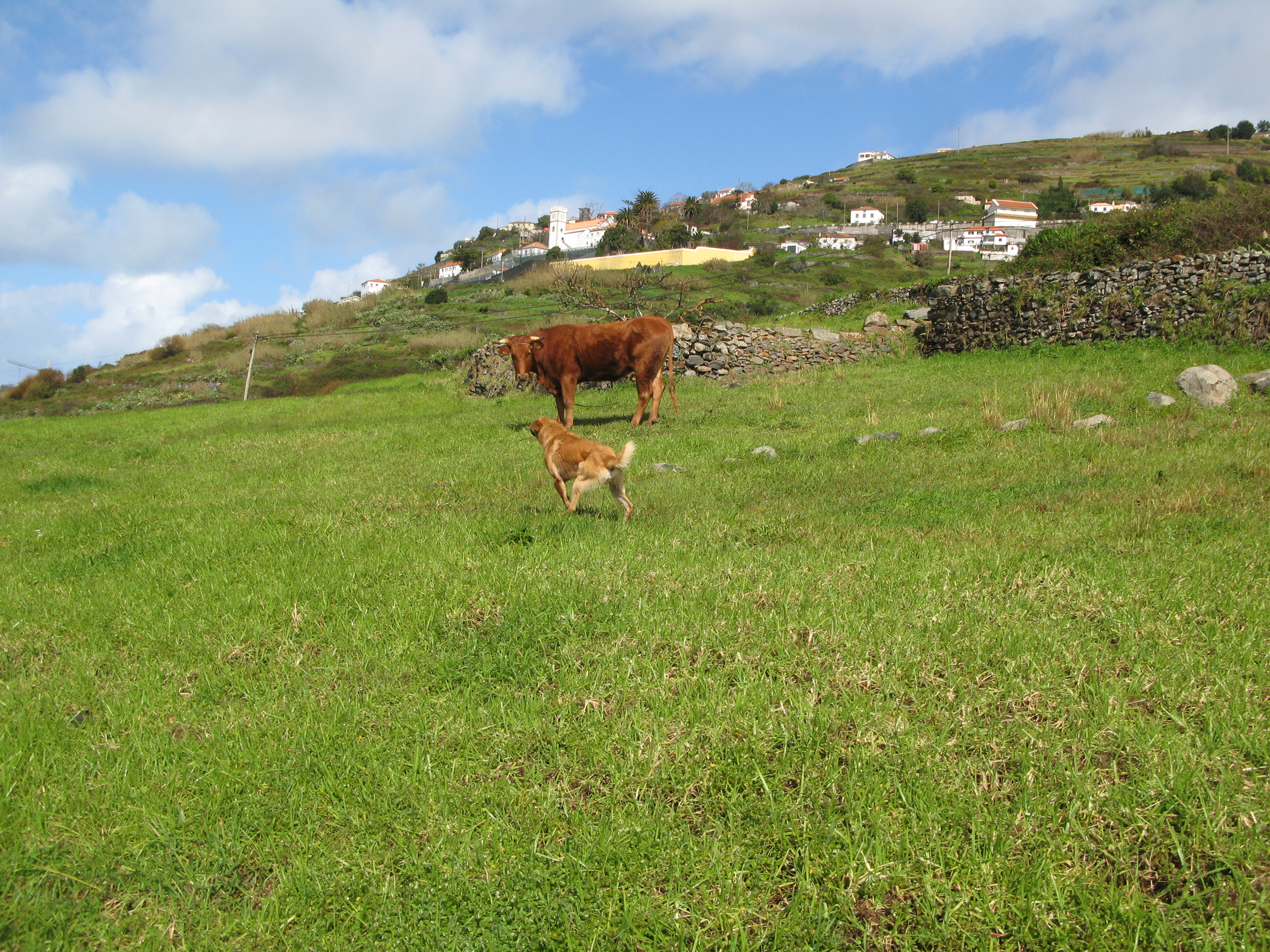
- The pasturelands of Fajã da Ovelha, looking towards the parochial church and centre

- Location in Madeira
- Coordinates: 32°46′58″N 17°12′6″W
- Country: Portugal
- Auton. region: Madeira
- Island: Madeira
- Municipality: Calheta
- Established: Settlement: fl. 1480; Parish: c. 1573

Area
  - Total: 22.16 km^{2} (8.56 sq mi)

Population (2011)
  - Total: 895
  - Density: 40.4/km^{2} (105/sq mi)
- Time zone: UTC+00:00 (WET)
  - Summer (DST): UTC+01:00 (WEST)
- Postal code: 9370-362
- Area code: 291
- Patron: São João Baptista
- Website: www.jf-fajadaovelha.pt

Fajã da Ovelha is a civil parish in the municipality of Calheta in the Portuguese island of Madeira. The population in 2011 was 895, in an area of 22.16 km^{2}. Located about 7 km northwest of the town of Calheta, this parish includes three bands of residential, forested and mountain area; the population is actually concentrated in the area between ocean cliffs and main regional road.

== History ==
Fajã da Ovelha originally served as a port of easy access to Madeira, in an area that crossed by several major ravines. Much like many of the parishes, the settlement originally formed around a small chapel, this dedicated to São Lourenço, and the community was drawn together common agricultural roots. It is unclear when the settlement formed, and the unique story relates to a settler, Gonçalo Ferreira de Carvalho, who "lived [here] in the years around 1480". A few branches of families from Calheta and Paul, began to settle in this area, but no clear point marked the organization of a colony. The Chapel of São Lourenço (Portuguese: Ermida de São Lourenço), of a Manueline-style, was established at the end of the 16th century, as a small sacristy, and in 1550, it became the basis for the new parish, where it remained until the second quarter of the 18th century.

From regal charter, dated 11 April 1553, the chapel was extended, and by 1559 the local clergy began receiving an increase in their budget. At about this time, the parish of Ponta do Pargo was de-annexed from Fajã da Ovelha, to be closely followed by the parish of Prazeres.

The oldest document for this parish, dated 1553, referring to the parochial church first identified this area as Fajã da Ovelha, from which the new parish received its identity. As Gaspar Frutuoso documented: "It is vulgar that a simple episode, an occasional circumstance or a fact of little value, would justify the existence of name applied to a determined site or place, that afterwards it would be converted into a population centre or an important place. Similarly, this occurred with the name of this parish."

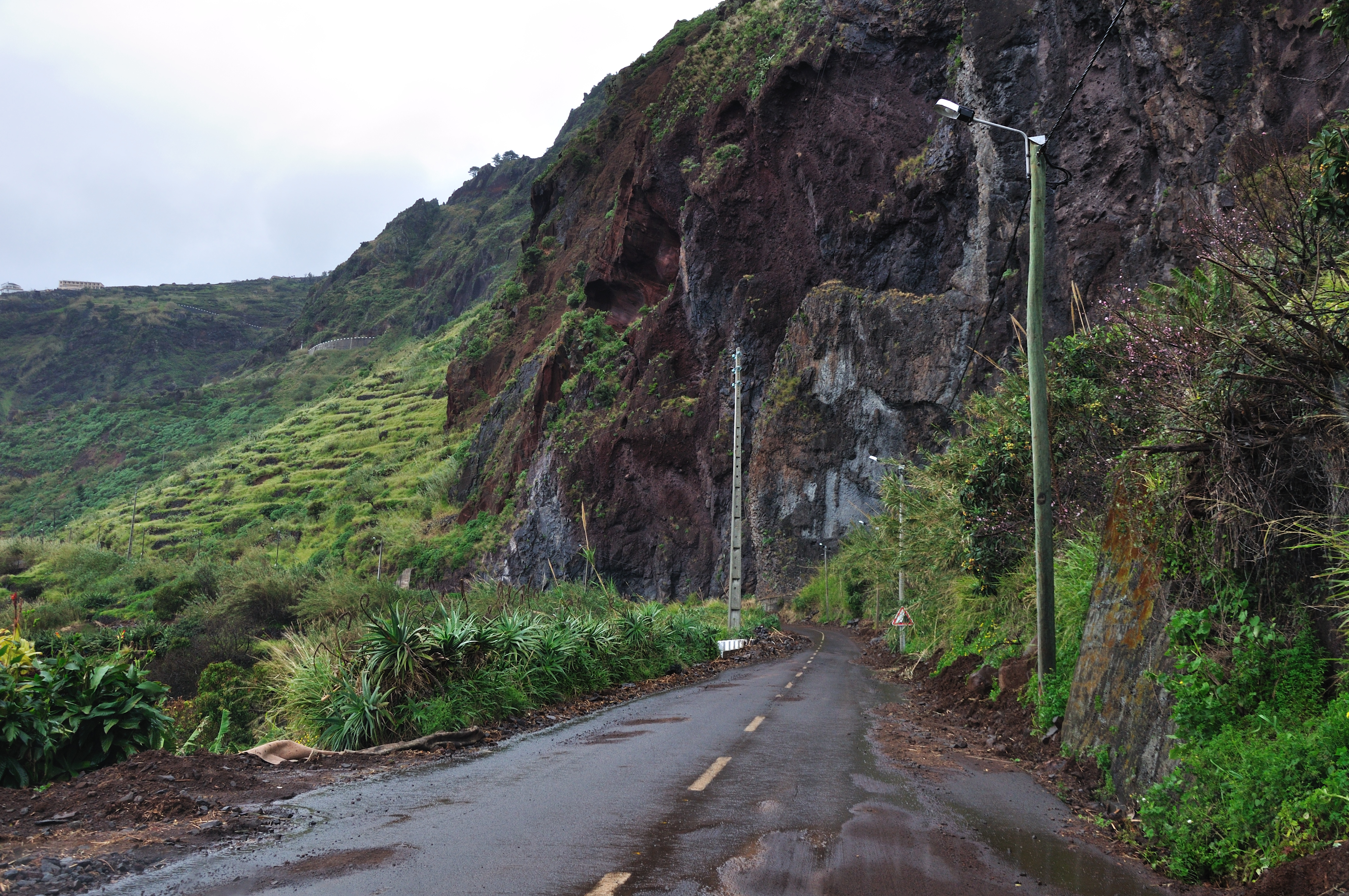
The coastal cliffs that separate Fajã da Ovelha from the south-eastern communities of Calheta

Fajã da Ovelha existed as an autonomous parish before 1573 and, by the end of the 18th century, its demographic growth justified a permanent clergy in the parish.

In 1705, the Infanta Catarina, the Royal Regent, approved the construction of a new temple, whose location became the centre of the parish (until then composed of dispersed homes throughout the foothills of the Serra do Paul). It was concluded at the end of the 18th century and invoked the name of John the Baptist, while the smaller chapel of São Lourenço remained a functioning entity in its own right.

== Subdivisions ==
The parish of Fajã da Ovelha is traditionally divided into several localities or hamlets (Portuguese: sítios). The population is primarily concentrated in the lower and middle elevations, clustered between the coastal cliffs and the regional road. The main hamlets include:

- Lombada dos Marinheiros
- Maloeira
- Raposeira do Lugarinho
- Raposeira do Serrado
- São Lourenço – the historical center and site of the Manueline chapel.
- Fajã de Ovelha de Baixo
- Fajã de Ovelha de Cima

These settlements are distributed across the parish's three distinct zones: the residential coastal belt, the forested mid-section, and the mountain area.
