= Vasco da Gama Rodrigues =

Portuguese poet

Vasco da Gama Rodrigues (27 January 1909, Paul do Mar, Madeira – 3 May 1991), was a Portuguese poet. Rodrigues moved in his youth to Mozambique, then a Portuguese colony. In his twenties he returned to Lisbon, where he worked in Lisbon's Tourism Inspection Department. During this time he started writing and some of his works were published. His works are in the style of Agostinho da Silva and Álvaro Ribeiro. Lisbon's Câmara Municipal (Municipal Chamber) named a street after him in Santa Maria dos Olivais. On 3 May 2009, the school in Paul do Mar was renamed Vasco da Gama Rodrigues School in a ceremony led by the Regional Secretary for Education & Culture, Francisco Fernandes, and organised by the cultural centre Casa do Povo do Paul do Mar.

== Works ==
- Os Atlantes (1961)
- As Três Taças(1972)
- O Cristo das Nações (1995)
