= Calheta, Madeira =

Calheta
- Municipality
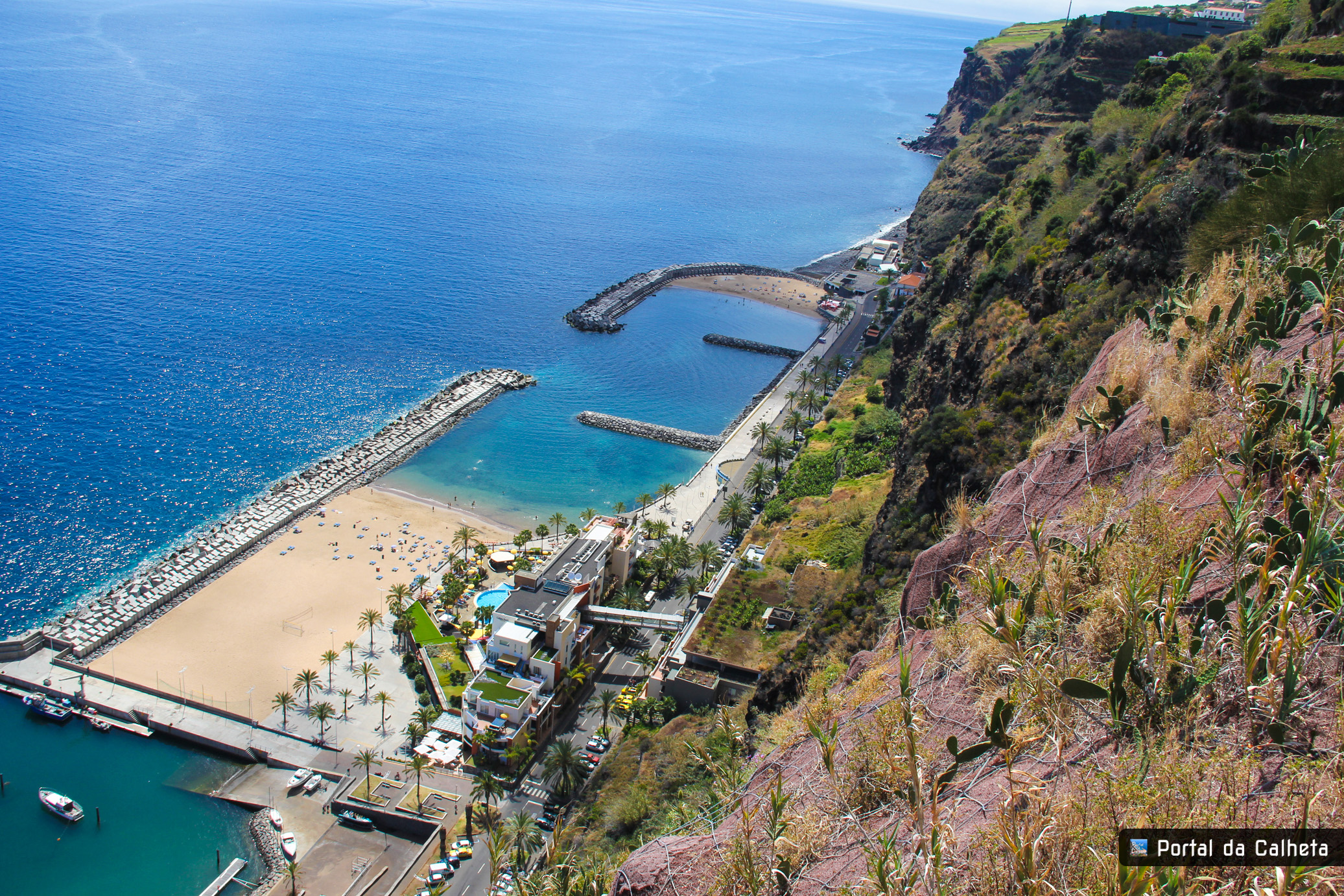
- Praia da Calheta view from the top

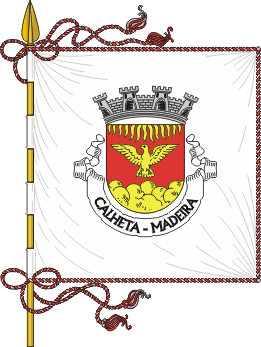
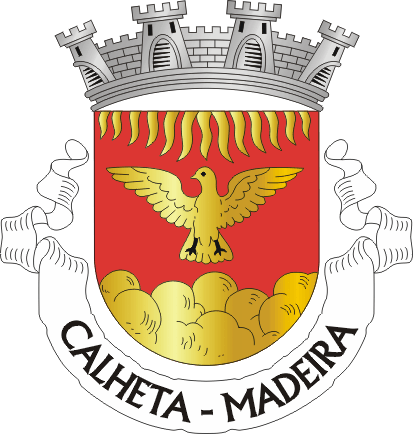
- Flag Coat of arms
- Interactive map of Calheta
- Location in Madeira
- Coordinates: 32°43′33″N 17°9′57″W
- Country: Portugal
- Auton. region: Madeira
- Island: Madeira
- Established: Settlement: 1 July 1502; Municipality: c. 1835
- Parishes: 8

Government
  - President: Carlos Teles

Area
  - Total: 111.50 km^{2} (43.05 sq mi)

Population (2011)
  - Total: 11,521
  - Density: 103.33/km^{2} (267.62/sq mi)
- Time zone: UTC+00:00 (WET)
  - Summer (DST): UTC+01:00 (WEST)
- Postal code: 9370-135
- Area code: 291
- Patron: Espírito Santo
- Local holiday: 24 June
- Website: http://www.cmcalheta.pt/

Calheta (Portuguese pronunciation: [kɐˈʎetɐ]) is a municipality on the southwest coast of Madeira, Portugal. The population in 2011 was 11,521, in an area of 111.50 km^{2}.

== History ==
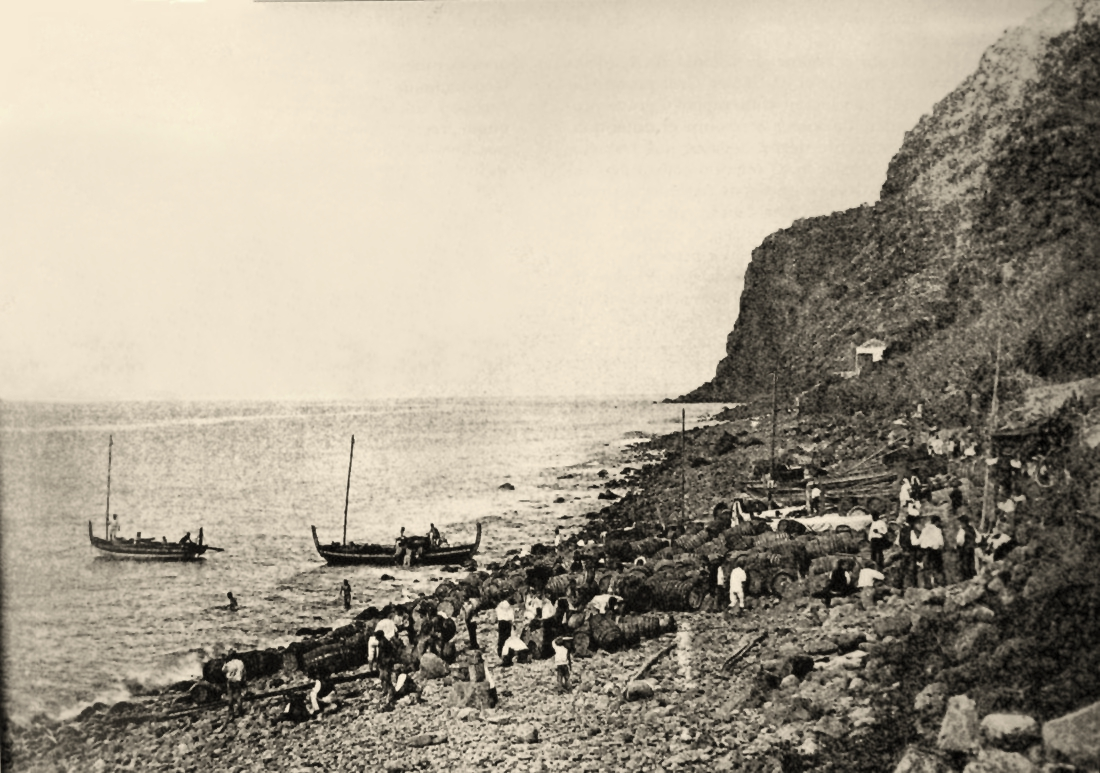
A historical image of the rocky beach of Calhau da Calheta, as workers transport barrels of Madeira wine for shipment

The origin of the areas name, are both related to the toponymy of Calheta (which means "small bay" in Portuguese, but "cal" also means "lime" and it relates to limestone): first, that there existed a small bay or cove, which already had this name, but secondly, that the area of the settlement was the off-port for sugar and collection of wood. Calheta was founded in 1430; the parish, of the same name (which is the central part of the municipality) is one of the oldest parishes on the island of Madeira, and one of the first to be explored by the early settlers. It was the area selected by João Gonçalves Zarco (the island's discoverer) as a grant to his son and his wife, João Gonçalves da Câmara and Beatriz Gonçalves.

The village became a town 72 years after its foundation, on 1 July 1502, after a royal foral (charter) was granted by King Manuel I. The region was primarily settled by noblemen and knights, influencing the toponymic names that appeared in many of its localities: such as Lombo do Doutor and Lombo do Atouguia. In 1502, João de França constructed the Chapel of Nossa Senhora da Graça (English: Our Lady of Grace), which was to be the basis for the new parish of Calheta, founding the first and oldest institutions of the parish. Similarly, the Santa Casa da Misericórdia was established in 1535, to serve the elderly and provide healthcare for the local residents.

The parish of Prazeres, which was an ecclesiastical component of Estreito da Calheta was dismembered in 1733, becoming an autonomous clergy on 12 November (which was later followed by the first cornerstone of the Church of Prazeres, in 1751). The Liberal revolution resulted in the incorporation of Calheta as a municipality in 1835. Similarly, the parish of Ponta do Pargo, after several years of being a part of the municipality of Porto Moniz (between 1835 and 1849), began to function as an administrative unit of the municipality of Calheta after the latter municipal seat was disincorporated. The restoration of Porto Moniz in 1855, resulted in the parishes reincorporation within the borders of Porto Moniz. By law, on 26 June 1871, was reintegrated into Ponta do Pargo.

Tristão Vaz Teixeira Bettencourt da Câmara, was granted the title of Baron of Jardim do Mar: his was a proprietor and later the director of the Diário de Notícias in Funchal. In one of the last events of the monarchy of Portugal affecting Calheta, King Carlos I of Portugal and Queen Amélie of Orléans visited the village of Calheta, travelling to Rabaçal, during their trip to Madeira. On 5 June 1922, the lighthouse in Ponta da Vigia, Ponta do Pargo was inaugurated to protect the western coast of the island. The Bairro Piscatório do Paul do Mar (a block of homes destined for people involved in the fishery sector) were inaugurated in July 1944.

== Geography ==
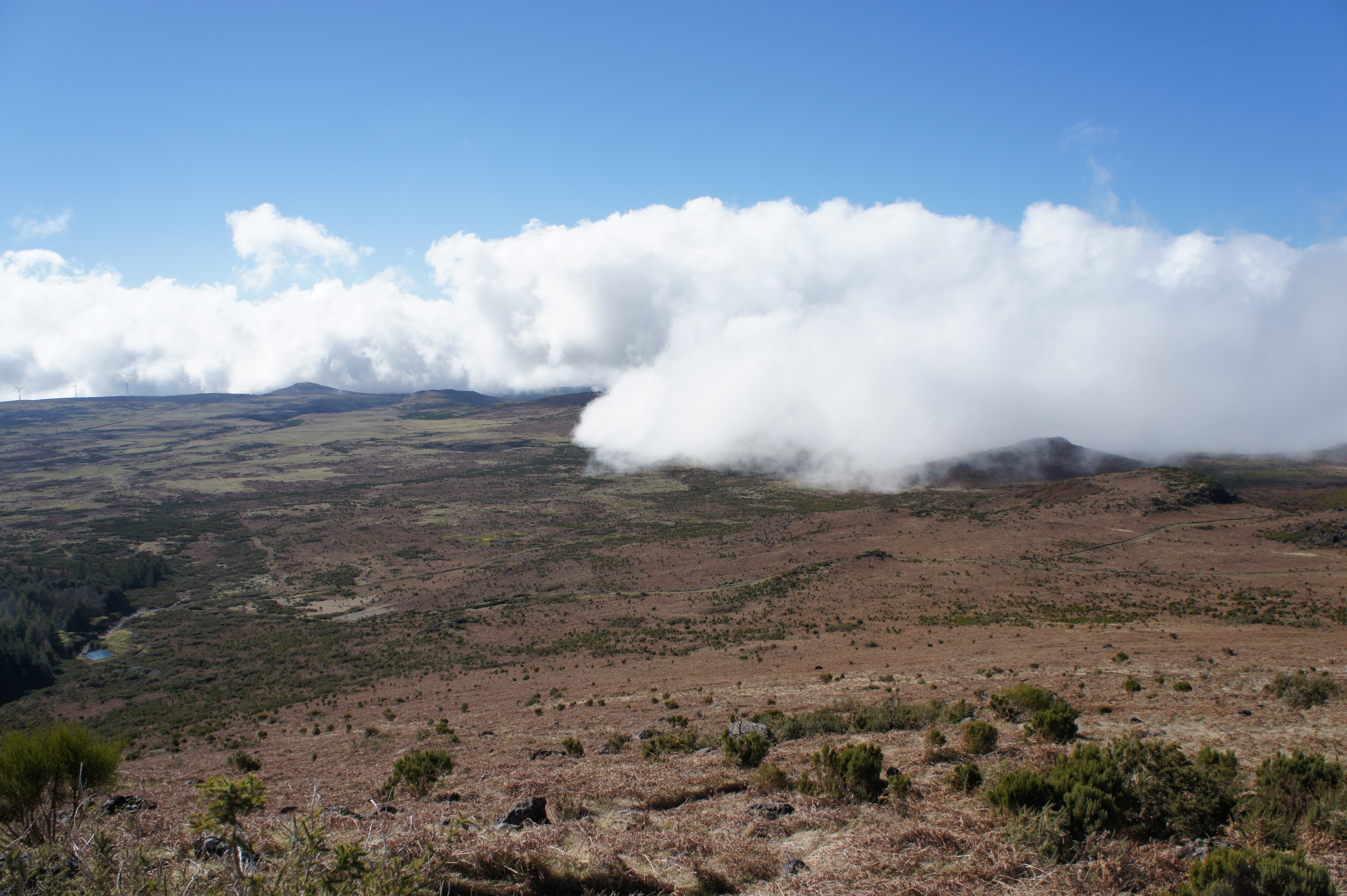
Paul da Serra, the northern extent of the municipality of Calheta

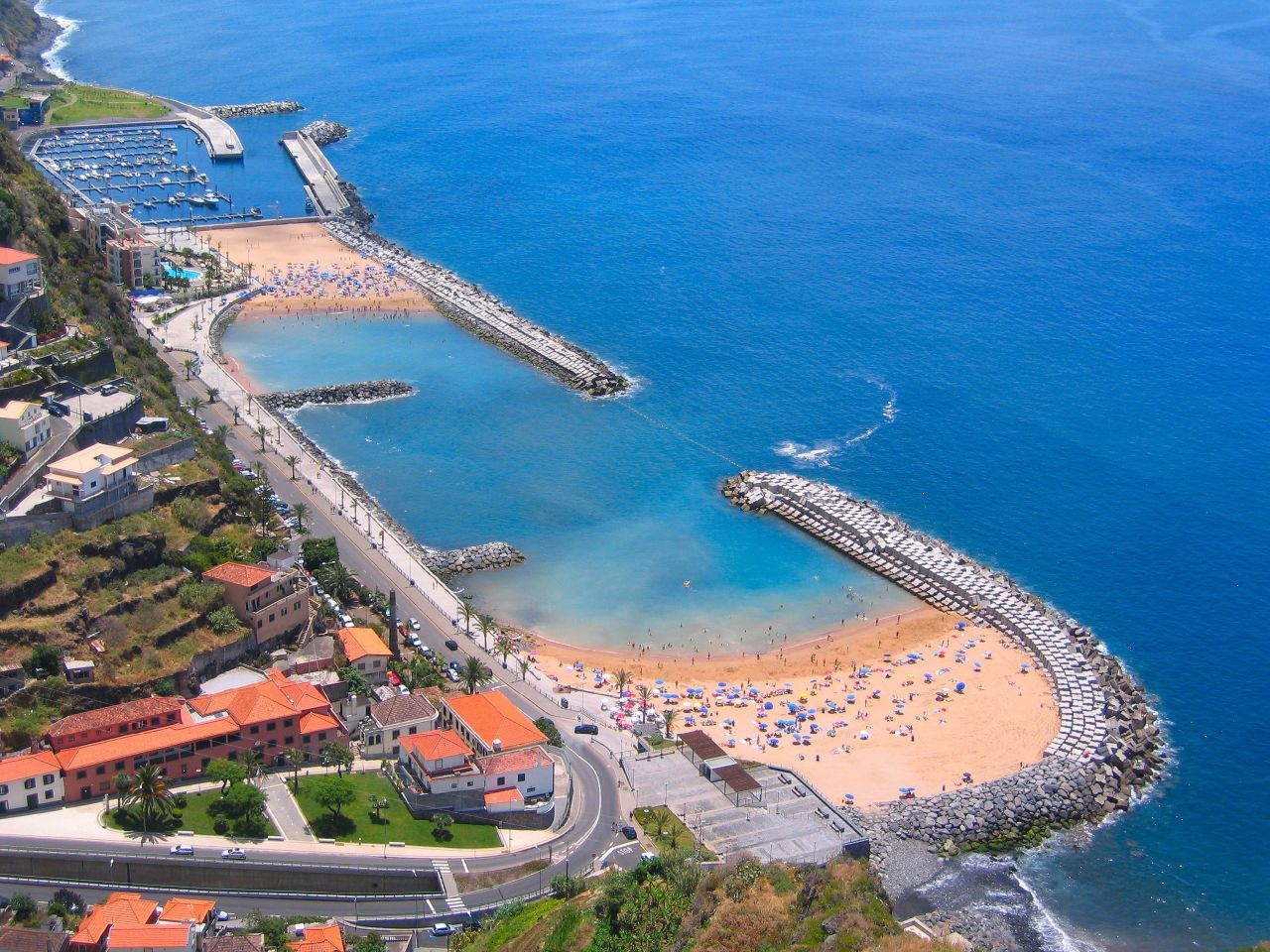
The manufactured coastal beach of Calheta: replacing the dark rock/sand of the volcanic island with beach sand for tourism

=== Physical geography ===
Calheta is located west of Santana, Machico and Funchal, along the southern roadway.

Even from its position Saharan Desert sands are able to occasionally affect the area, producing minor dust clouds.

=== Human geography ===
For statistical and administrative reasons, it is referred to as Vila da Calheta to avoid confusion with other Calhetas in Portugal, such as Calheta in the Azores.

The municipality includes eight administrative parishes that handle local affairs, representing individual communities along the roadways of the municipality:

- Arco da Calheta
- Calheta
- Estreito da Calheta
- Fajã da Ovelha
- Jardim do Mar
- Paúl do Mar
- Ponta do Pargo
- Prazeres

Calheta, the parish, had a population of 3,163 (2011), within an administrative area of 23.45 km^{2}.

== Economy ==
Agriculture and the fishery provides the primary sources of income in this area, although minor commercial establishments are concentrated in the principal village in the municipality. Agriculture was the first industry to develop in this region; the production/cultivation of banana, wine, horticulture and sugar cane developed as the main export products. The fishery supported the populations of Paúl do Mar and the vila of Calheta, although fishermen existed throughout the municipality.

Industrial activity has changed throughout the region, and has developed through cycles, including the dairy industry, fireworks, salt, beekeeping and sugar cane refinement, which have all undergone peaks and troughs. Of these, for example, the factory/ironworks used for conversion of honey into aguardente, a distilled spirit common in the village of Calheta and the fireworks buildings in the Lombo do Doutor were integral businesses in the municipalities development.

== Education ==
While the communities of Calheta do have two secondary schools (EBSC and EBSP), higher education facilities are located in Funchal. There are four main primary schools offering instruction for children: EB1 Ladeira e Lamaceiros and EB1 Lombo do Guiné (both in Arco da Calheta), EB1 Lombo do Atouguia and EB1 Calheta, EB1 Estreito da Calheta, as well as the kindergarten, JI Apresentação da Estrela run by catholic nuns (in Calheta). In the parish of Ponta do Pargo, Maria Amélia de Sousa, provided educational instruction, at the primary level, for many of the children of the western coast of Calheta, lasting 70 years. This formalized education was unique for including children of both sexes.

The municipal council has also been active in providing ancillary services to support the community, through the remodelling of many playgrounds (two of which include official football fields, in Prazeres and Paul do Mar) and a swimming pool by the EBSC.

== Notable people ==
- José Vicente de Freitas (1869 in Calheta–1952), 2nd Baron of Freitas, a Portuguese military officer and politician
- Vasco da Gama Rodrigues (1909 in Paul do Mar–1991), a Portuguese poet
