= Surfing in Madeira =

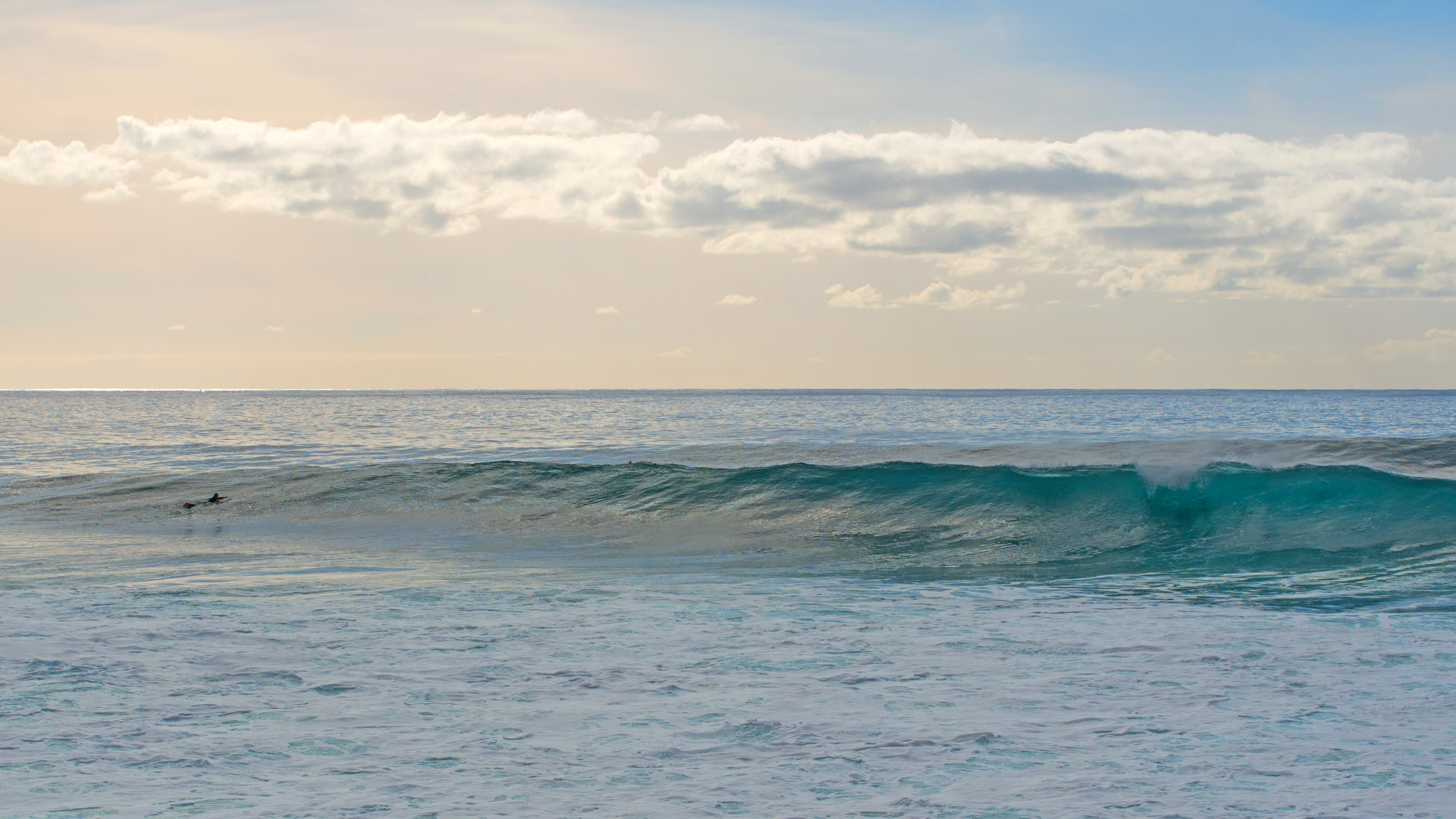
Paul do Mar

Surfing was first started in the Portuguese island of Madeira in the 1970s off the villages of Paul do Mar, Jardim do Mar and Ponta Pequena. Almost every surf spot has a rocky bottom with powerful waves; the winter months are particularly consistent. Madeira did not really come to the attention of foreign surfers until articles in surfing magazines in the mid-1990s. Since 1996, top Portuguese surfers from the mainland compete in the Madeira regional edition of the "Billabong Challenge".

In 2001, the World Big Wave Championships were held in Madeira for the first time.
