= Jardim do Mar =

- Civil parish
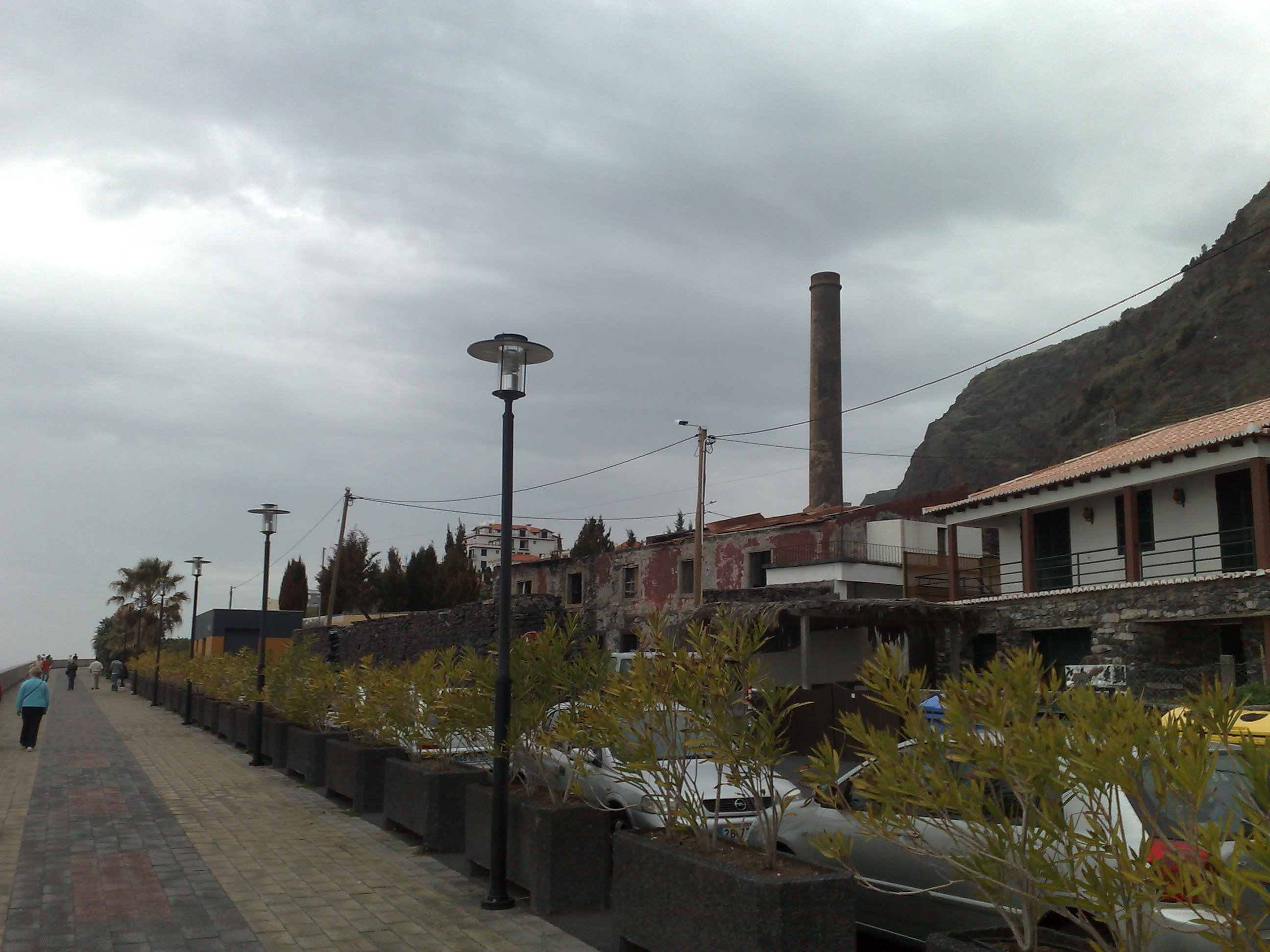
- A derelict sugar refinery on the coastal promenade of Jardim do Mar

- Location in Madeira
- Coordinates: 32°44′19″N 17°12′40″W
- Country: Portugal
- Auton. region: Madeira
- Island: Madeira
- Municipality: Calheta

Area
  - Total: 0.74 km^{2} (0.29 sq mi)
- Elevation: 50 m (160 ft)

Population (2011)
  - Total: 202
  - Density: 270/km^{2} (710/sq mi)
- Time zone: UTC+00:00 (WET)
  - Summer (DST): UTC+01:00 (WEST)
- Postal code: 9370-412
- Area code: 291
- Patron: Nossa Senhora do Rosário

Jardim do Mar (Portuguese for garden of the sea) is a civil parish in the western part of the municipality of Calheta in the Portuguese island of Madeira. The population in 2011 was 204, in an area of 0.74 km^{2}. It is approximately 3 kilometres (1.86 mi) northwest of Calheta.

== Geography ==
Jardim do Mar is a sliver of land between the Atlantic Ocean and the cliffs of the neighbouring parish of Prazeres, accessed by a single roadway and tunnel system to Prazeres and Estreito da Calheta.

The waves here can be very large in the winter months and during these time of the year surfing is practiced by experienced surfers.
