= Estreito da Calheta =

- Civil parish
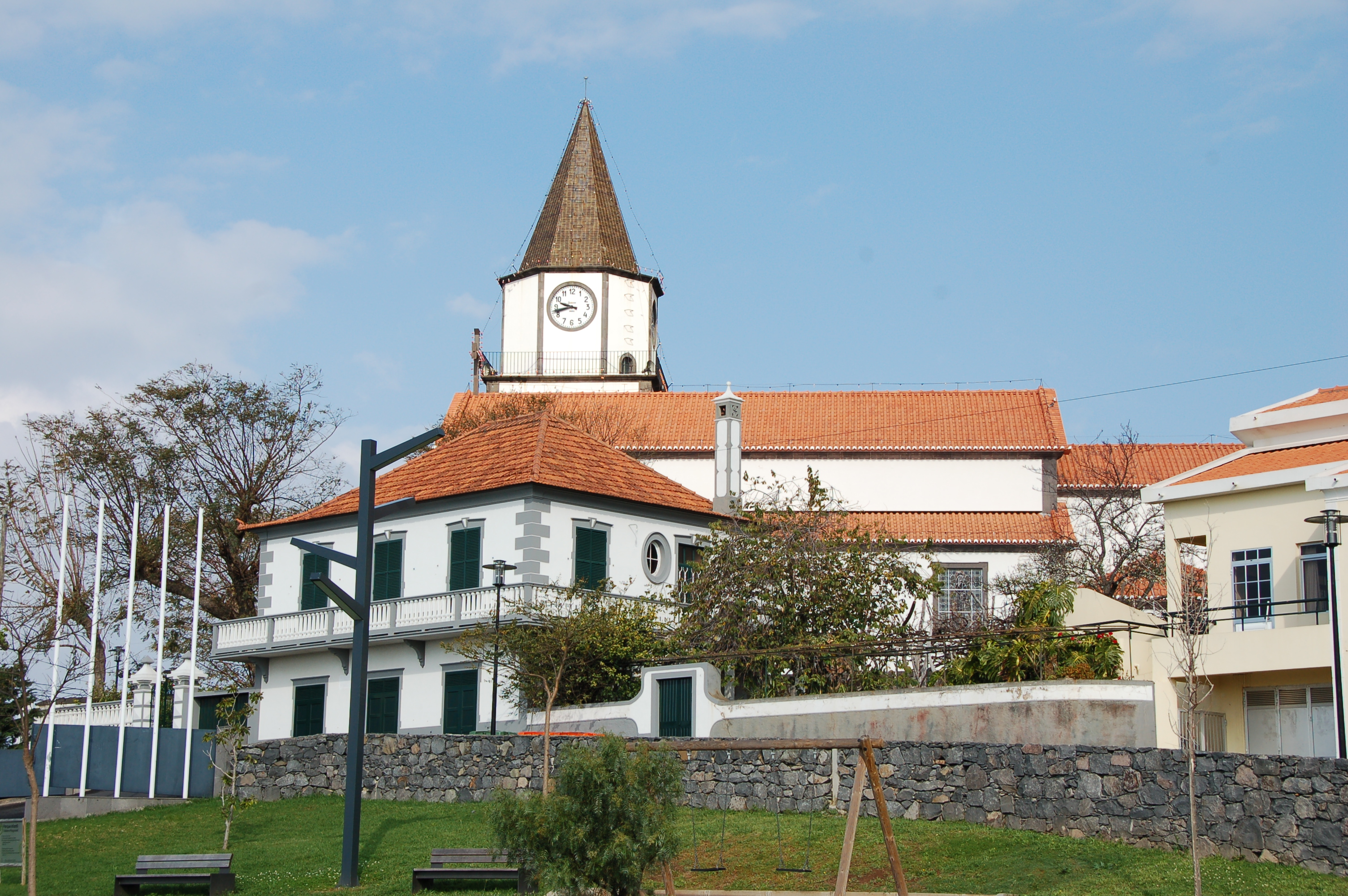
- The centre of the parish of Estreito da Calheta

- Location in Madeira
- Coordinates: 32°45′28″N 17°10′34″W
- Country: Portugal
- Auton. region: Madeira
- Island: Madeira
- Municipality: Calheta

Area
  - Total: 14.32 km^{2} (5.53 sq mi)

Population (2011)
  - Total: 1,607
  - Density: 112.2/km^{2} (290.7/sq mi)
- Time zone: UTC+00:00 (WET)
  - Summer (DST): UTC+01:00 (WEST)
- Postal code: 9370-111
- Area code: 291

Estreito da Calheta (Portuguese for strait of Calheta) is a civil parish in the municipality of Calheta in the Portuguese island of Madeira. The population in 2011 was 1,607, in an area of 14.32 km^{2}.
