= Levada das 25 Fontes =

Levada in Rabaçal, Madeira, Portugal

Coordinates: 32°45′18.5″N 17°08′01.6″W

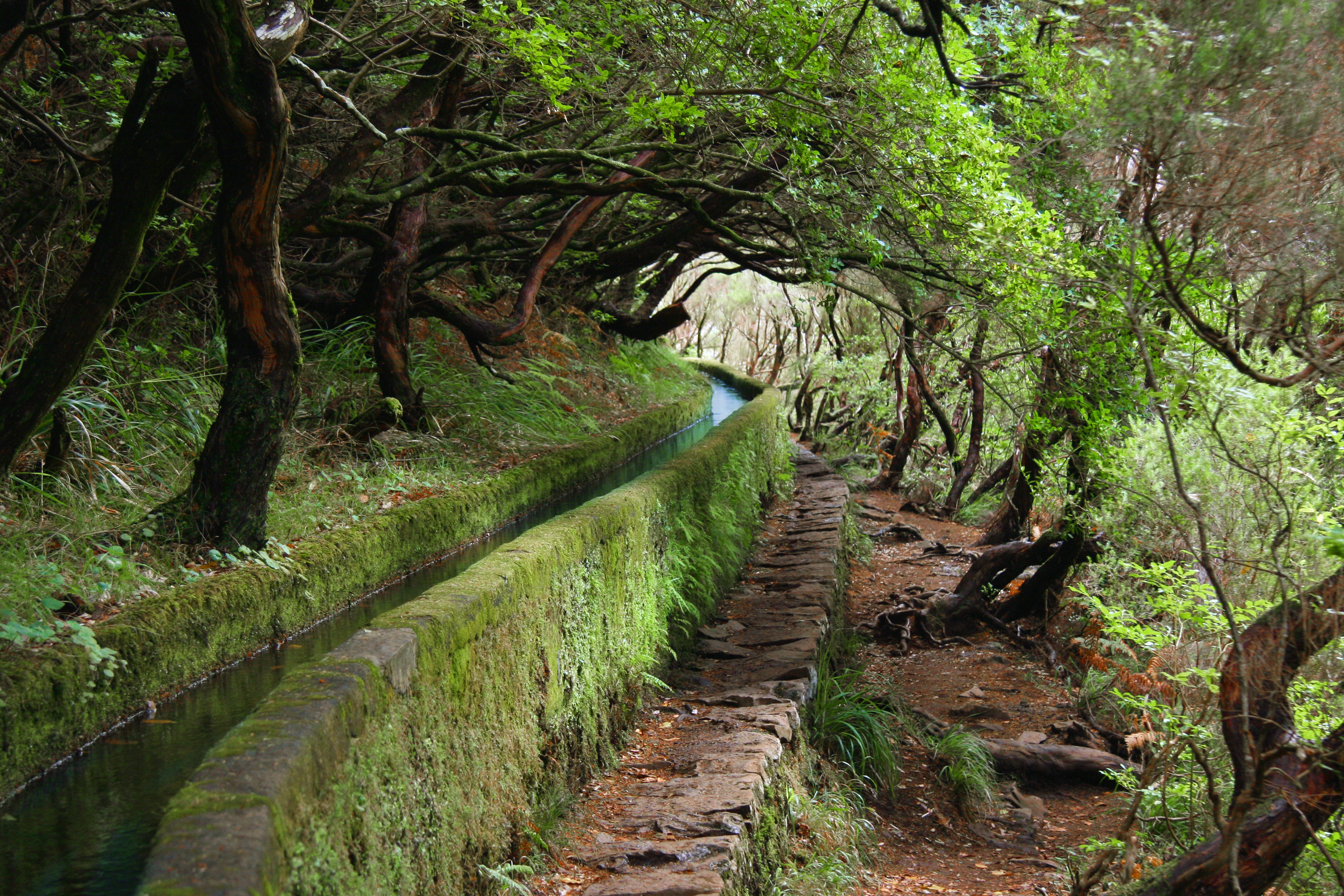
- Length: 4.6 km (2.9 mi)
- Location: Rabaçal, Paul da Serra, Madeira, Portugal
- Established: 1855
- Began construction: 1839
- Completed: 16 September 1855
- Use: Hiking, Aqueduct
- Highest point: 1,290 m (4,230 ft)
- Lowest point: 900 m (3,000 ft)
- Difficulty: Detail Distance: 4,6 Km (+ 4,6 Km return) Degree of difficulty:
- Season: All year
- Waymark: PR6
- Sights: 25 Fontes Falls, Risco waterfall, Laurel forest
- Surface: natural, carved Rock

The Levada das 25 Fontes is a levada that is located in Rabaçal, Paul da Serra, Madeira, Portugal.

It is one of the most visited levadas on the island. Access is possible via the road ER110 in Paul da Serra. From there walking or taking a bus is possible to the start of the levada which is at the casa do Rabaçal, from here it is possible to get to the lagoon of the Wind (Lagoa do Vento), 25 Fontes Falls and the Risco levada, which leads to the impressive Risco waterfall that emerges from the lagoon. A valley of vertical walls where different types of volcanic rock allow water from the upper water table to emerge in the form of numerous fountains along the walls of the mountain. The only problem is the narrowness of the road, in the middle of the Laurel forest and other walkers.

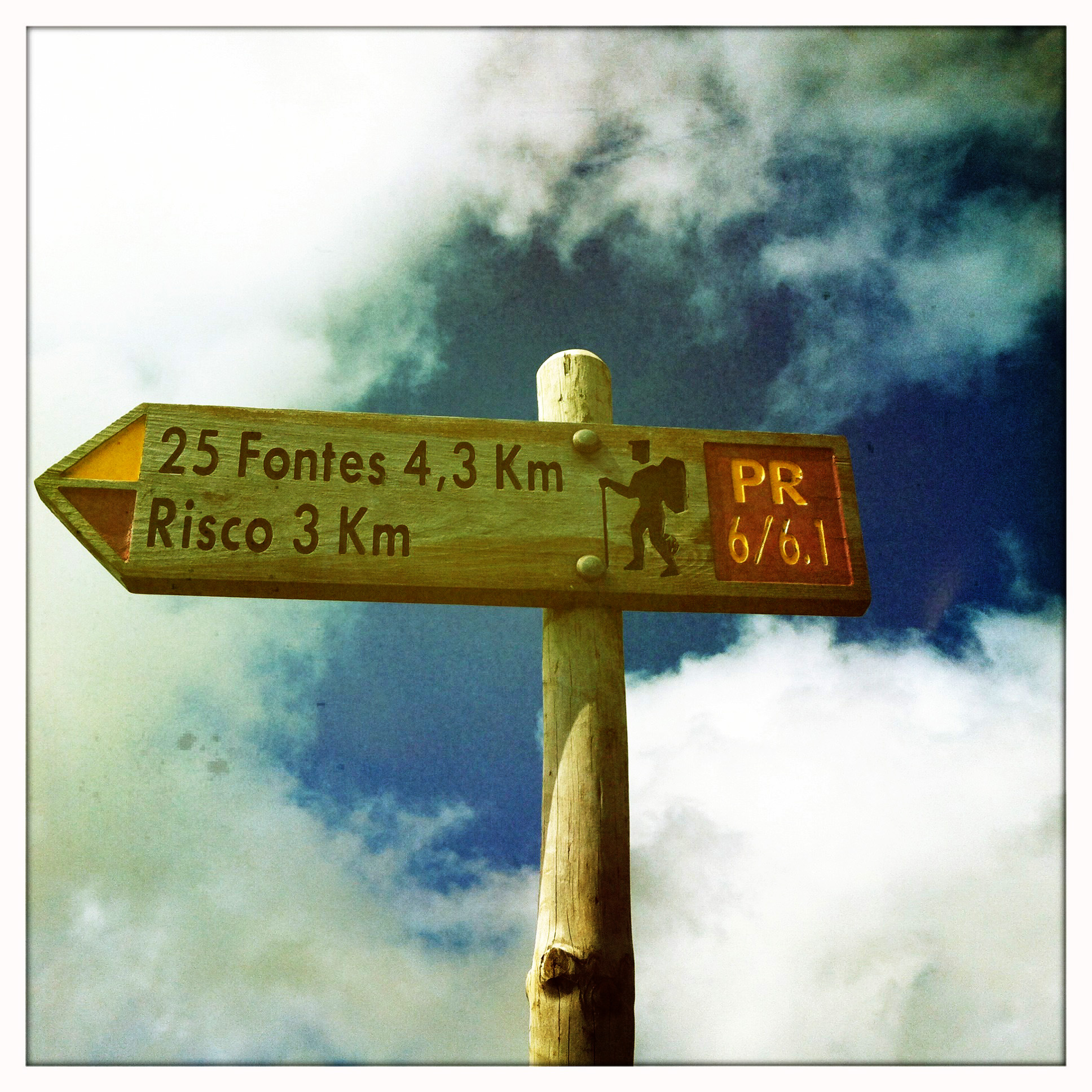

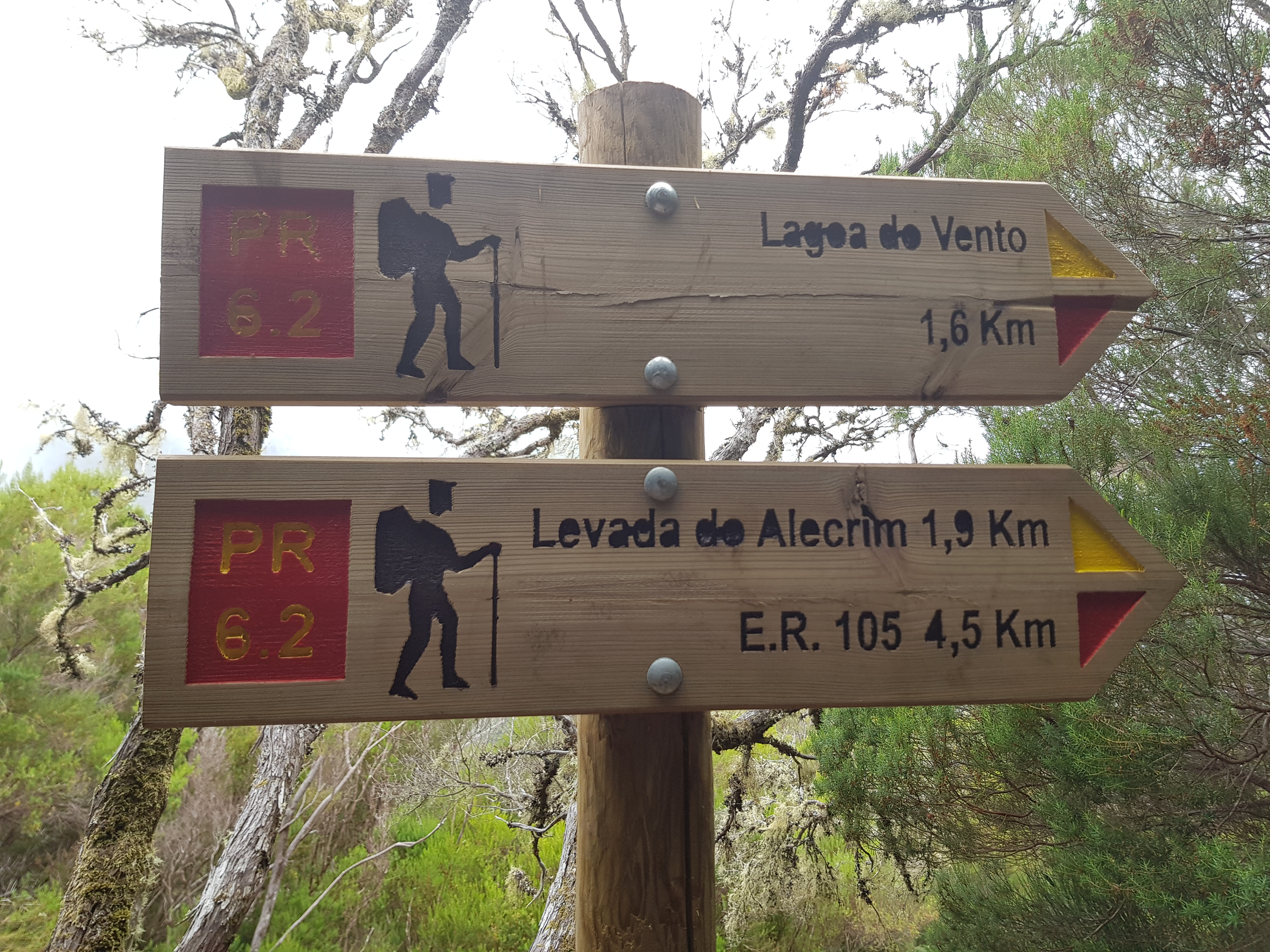

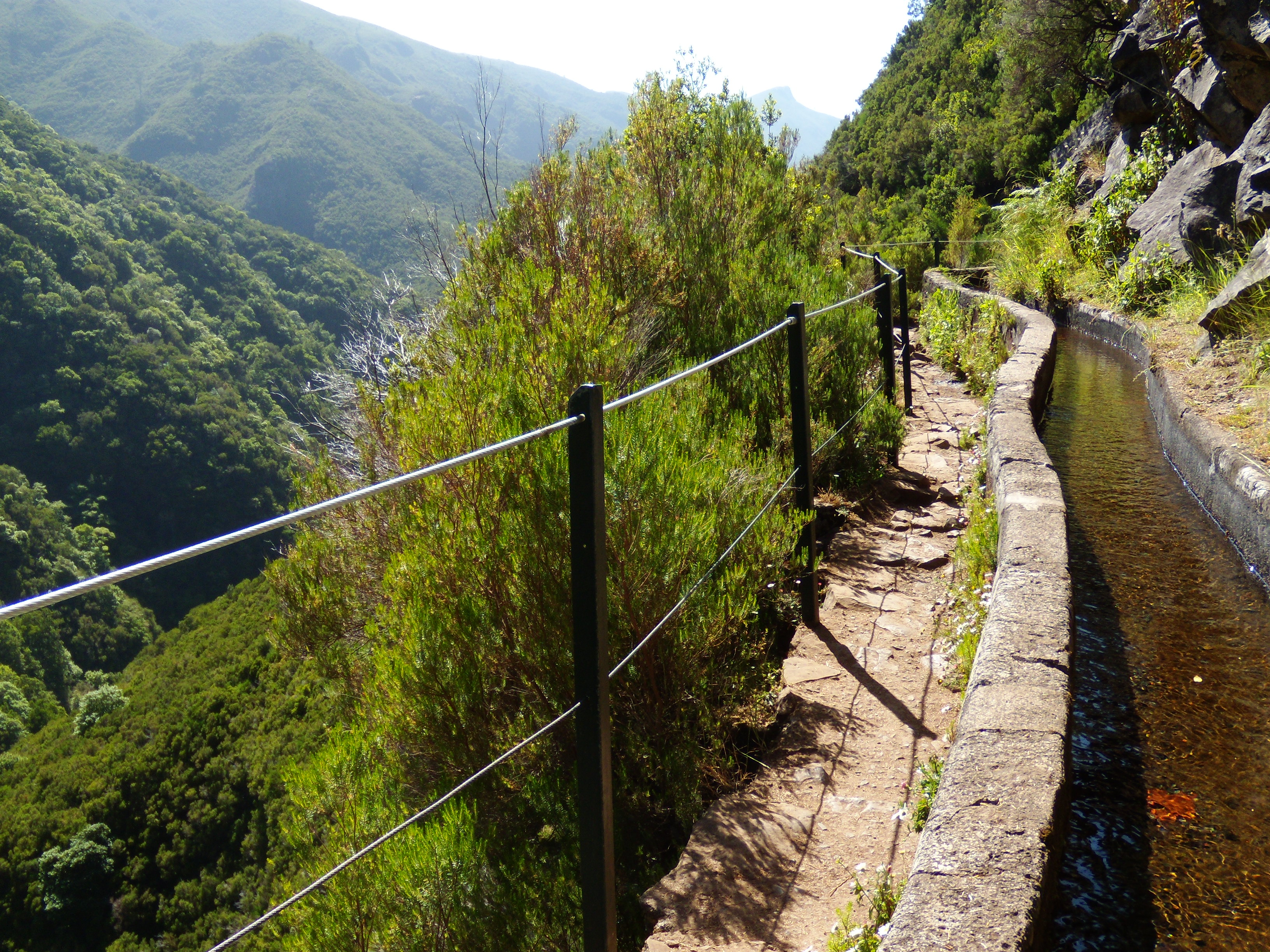

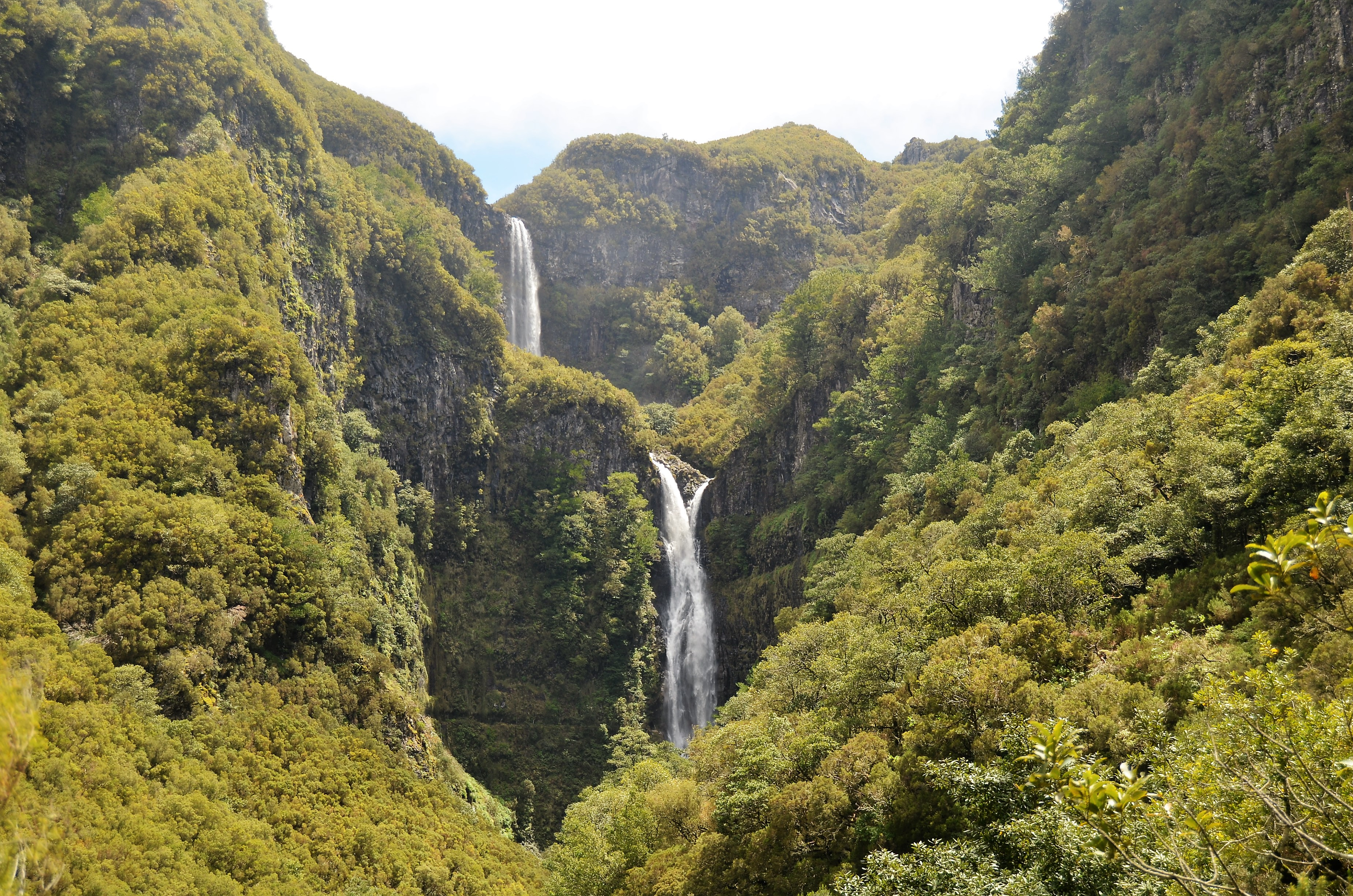

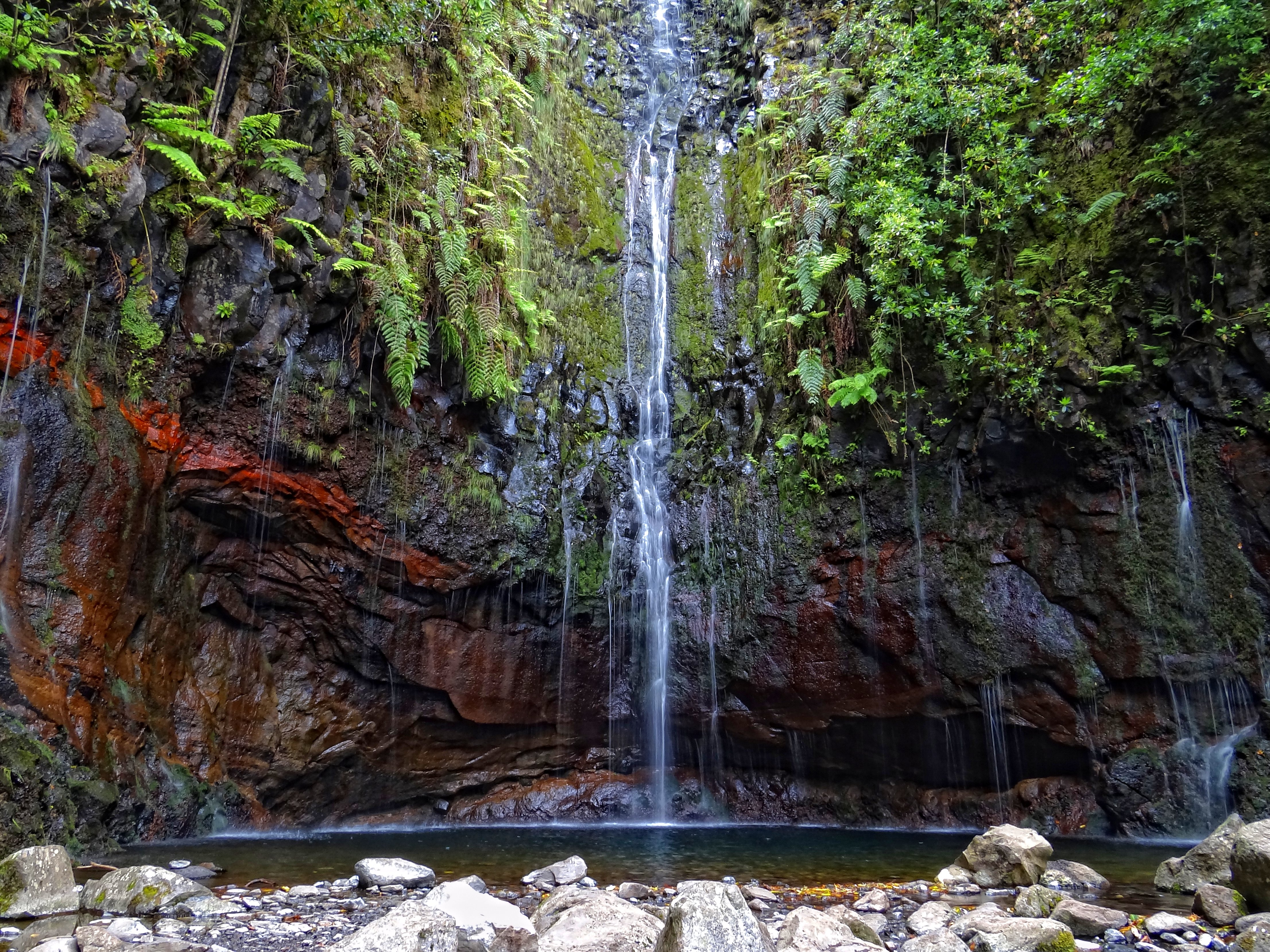
