= 25 Fontes Falls =

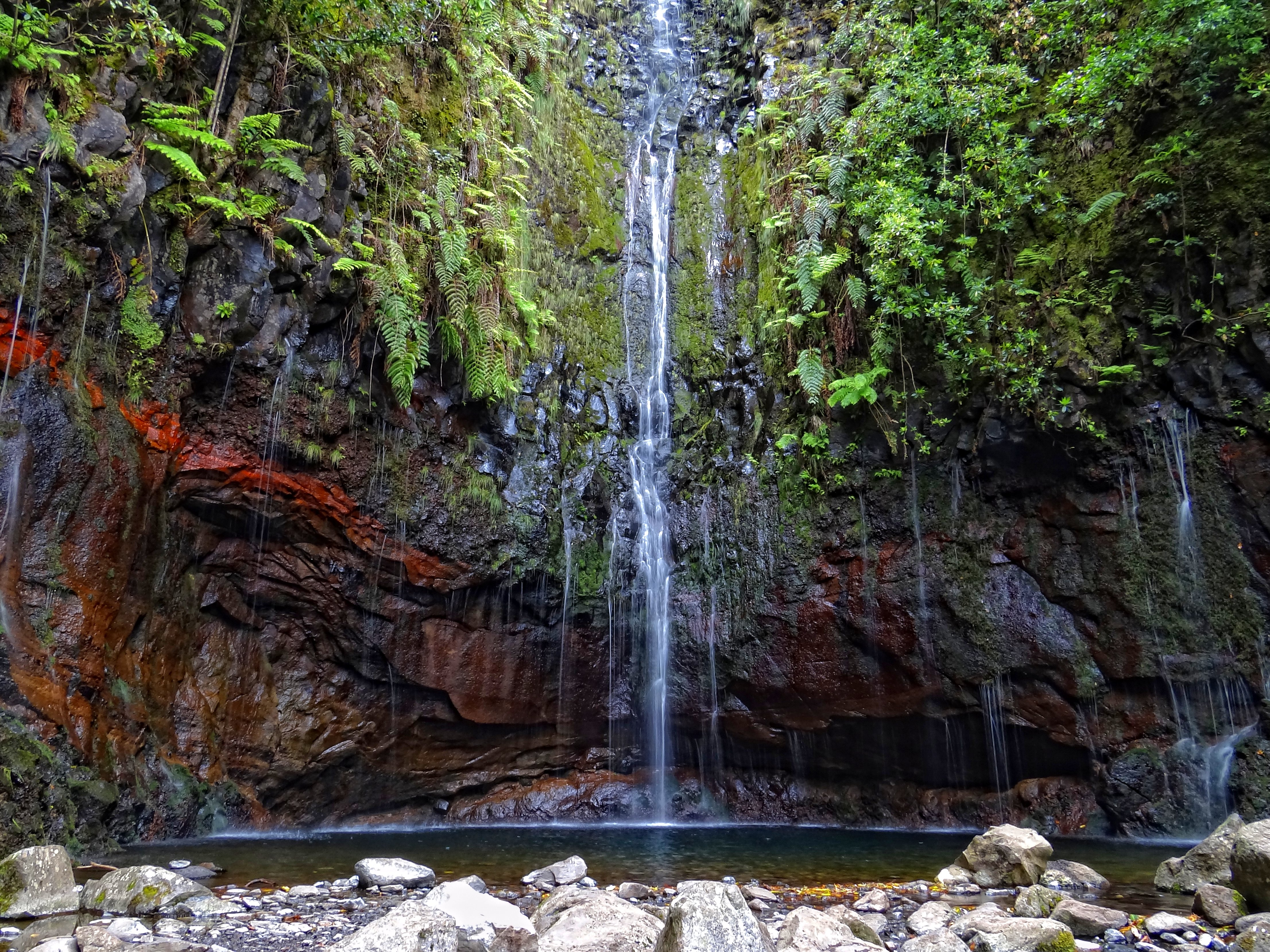
- 25 Fontes Falls on Madeira, Portugal

- Location within Madeira
- Location: Rabaçal, Paul da Serra, Madeira, Portugal
- Coordinates: 32.7655132°N 17.1254894°W
- Total height: 30 m (98 ft)
- Watercourse: Risco waterfall, Levada das 25 Fontes

The 25 Fontes ("25 Springs" in English) is a group of waterfalls located in Rabaçal, Paul da Serra on Madeira Island. Access is possible via the Levada das 25 Fontes.

The waterfall is 30m high, consisting of a group of different water streams coming vertically down the mountainside. At its foot there are rocks covered in small plants and a small natural pool.

It is involved in the primitive forest Laurisilva of Madeira, in the Macaronesia archipelago in the North Atlantic Ocean. The forest in this location consists of large quantities of bay trees.

== See also ==
- List of waterfalls
- Geography of Portugal
