= Lombada dos Marinheiros =

Agricultural area in Madeira, Portugal

- Hamlet
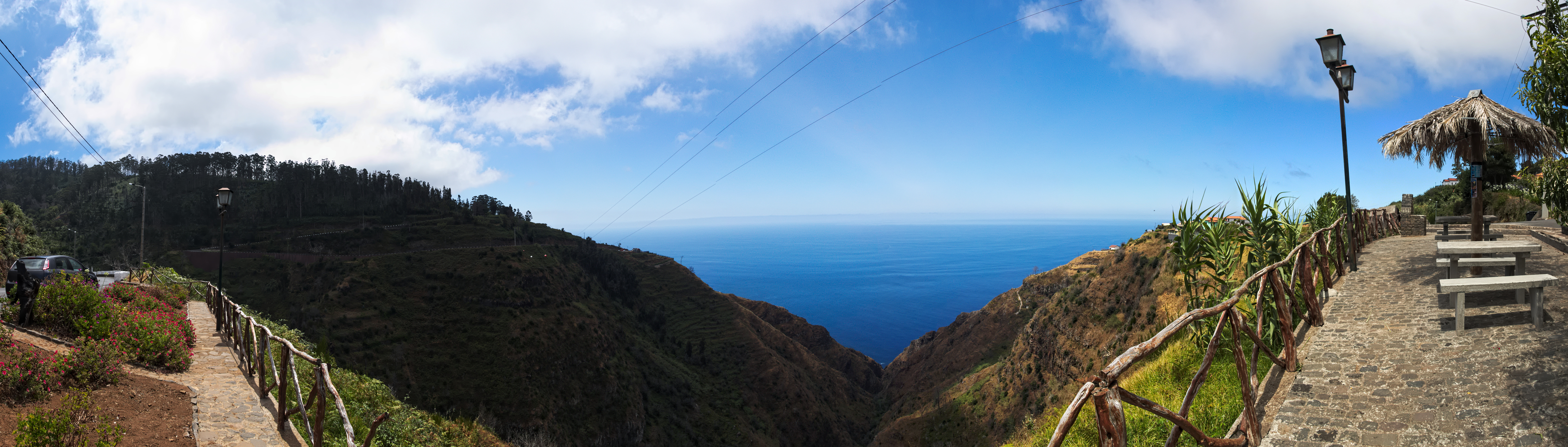
- Landscape view on the southwest coast of Madeira near Lombada dos Marinheiros

- Location of Lombada dos Marinheiros within Madeira
- Country: Portugal
- Autonomous Region: Madeira
- Municipality: Calheta
- Civil parish: Fajã da Ovelha

Lombada dos Marinheiros is an agricultural area in Fajã da Ovelha, a civil parish in the municipality of Calheta in the Portuguese island of Madeira.

The writer Catanho Fernandes said it is "a pleasant area, quiet and sun-baked". The terrain provides good conditions for cultivating vegetables and for cattle grazing areas.

The people who own the water rights in Lombada dos Marinheiros do an annual cleanup of the levada (irrigation channel) that connects to Madre d'Água.
