= Ribeiro Frio =

Human settlement in Portugal

Coordinates: 32°44′03″N 16°53′12″W

The village of Ribeiro Frio ("Cold Stream" in English) is situated in the interior of the Portuguese island of Madeira. It belongs to the parish of São Roque do Faial, the municipality of Santana, and is located around 15 kilometres (9.3 mi) from Funchal.

The little village is known for its trout farm. It is much visited by many tourists as it is a starting point for many levada walks, one leading to Balcões.

It is located 860 metres (2,820 ft) high, in a location surrounded by some woods of especially endemic species of laurel, such as the laurel (Laurus novocanariensis) and heather undergrowth (Erica madeirensis). It is also populated by native birds of the island such as the trocaz pigeon, the chaffinch (Fringilla coelebs madeirensis) and Madeira firecrest (Regulus madeirensis).

== Gallery ==
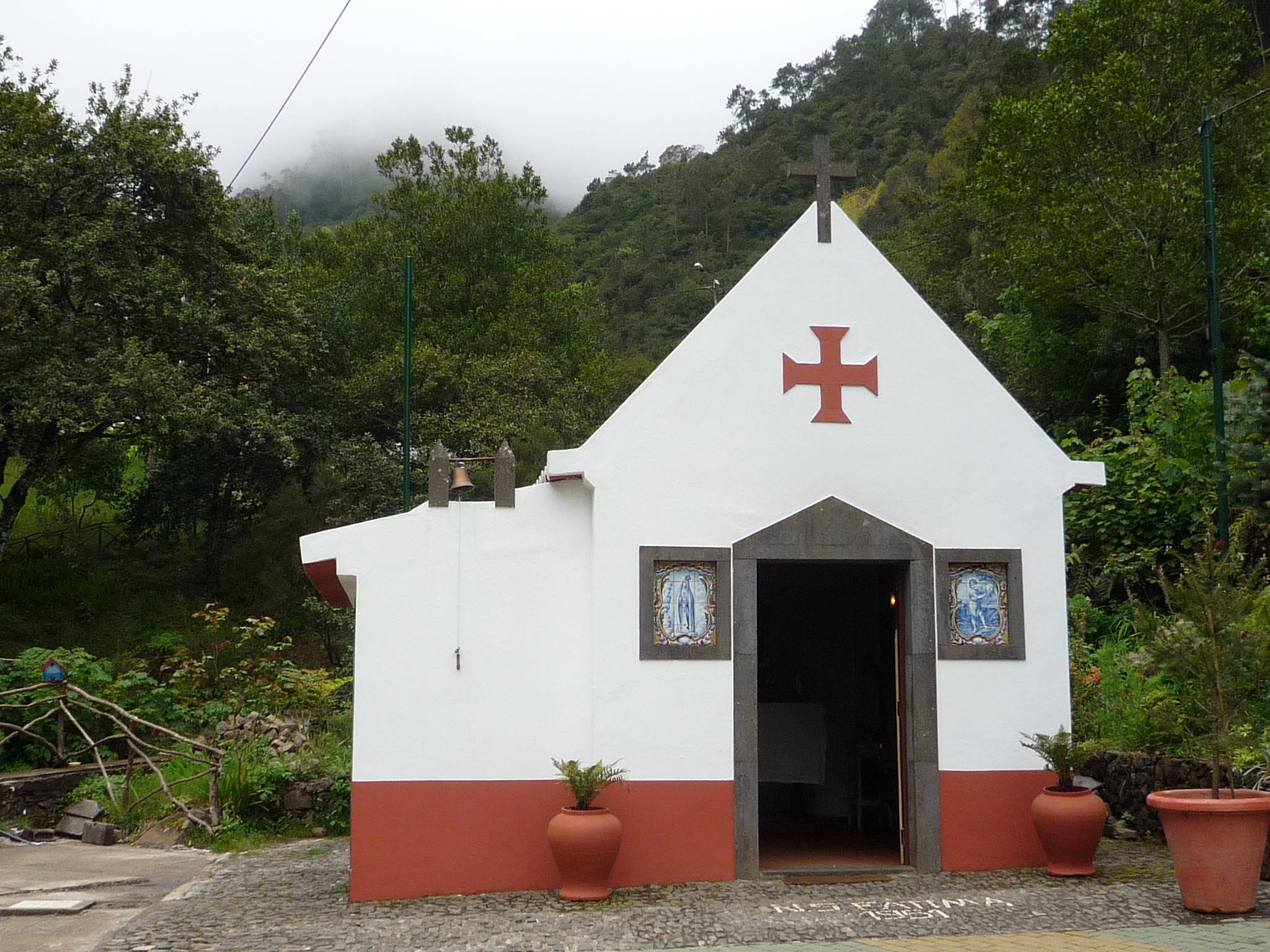
Chapel of our lady of Fátima

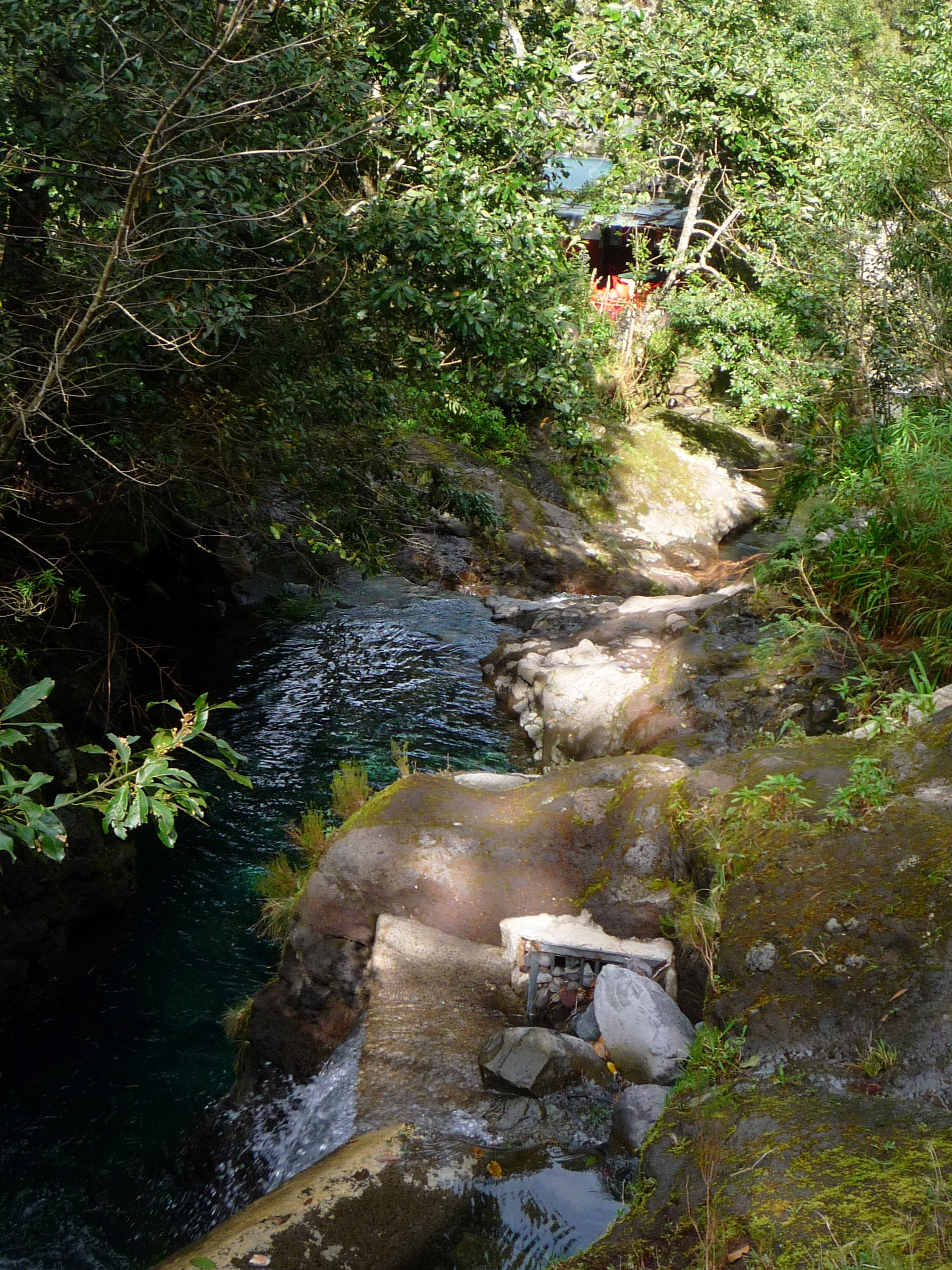
Ribeiro Frio

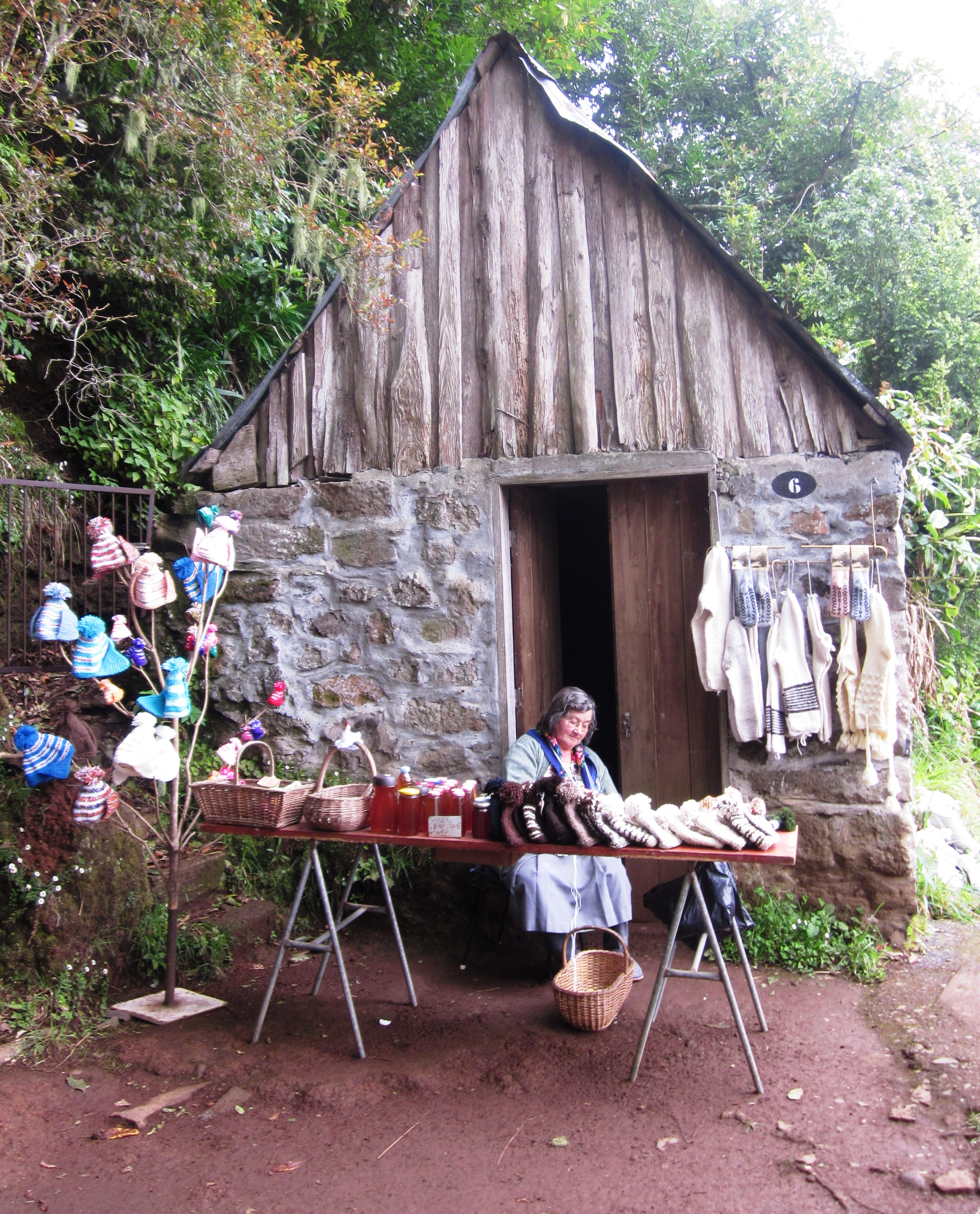
Shop near Ribeiro Frio

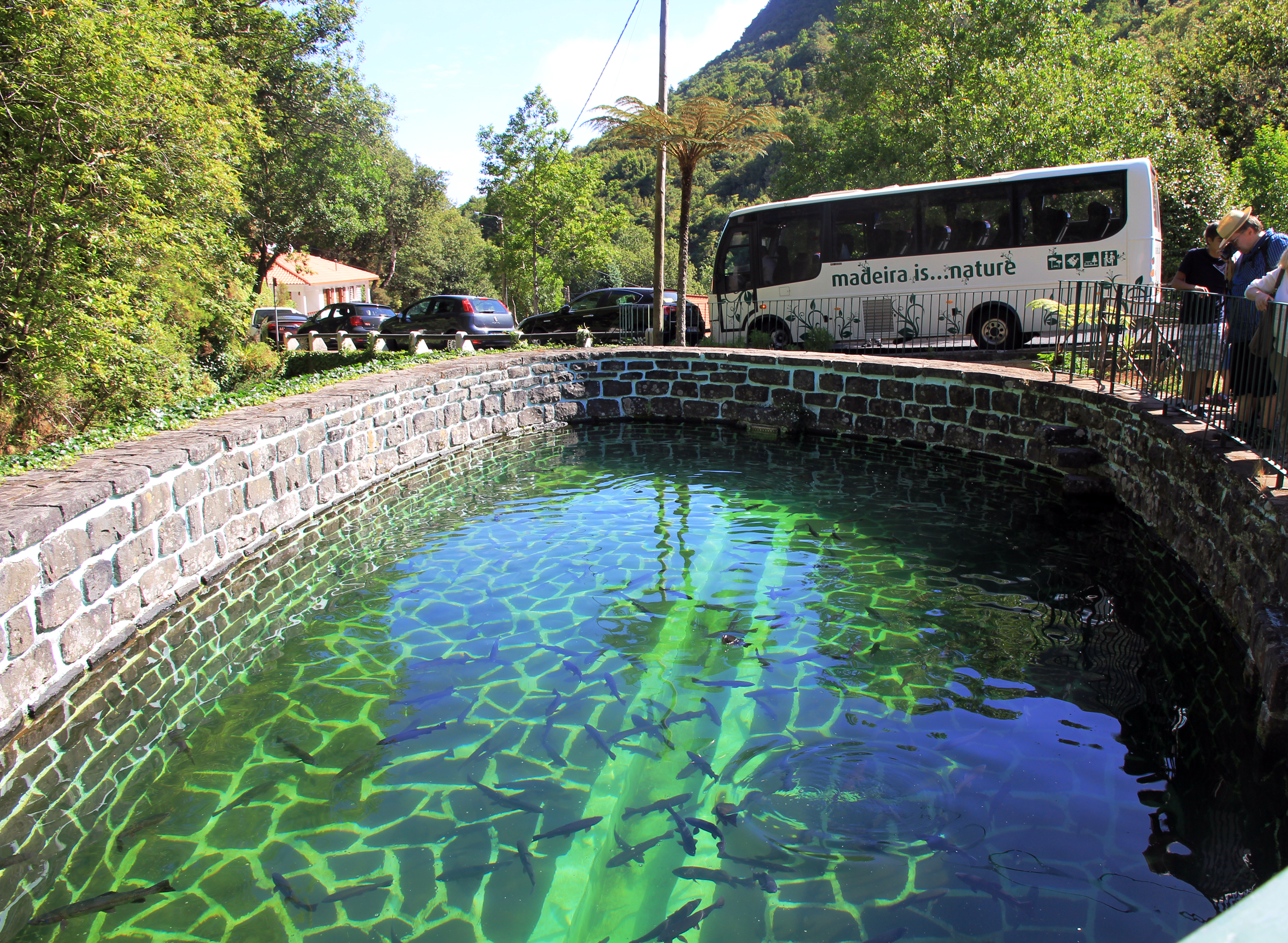
Trout farm

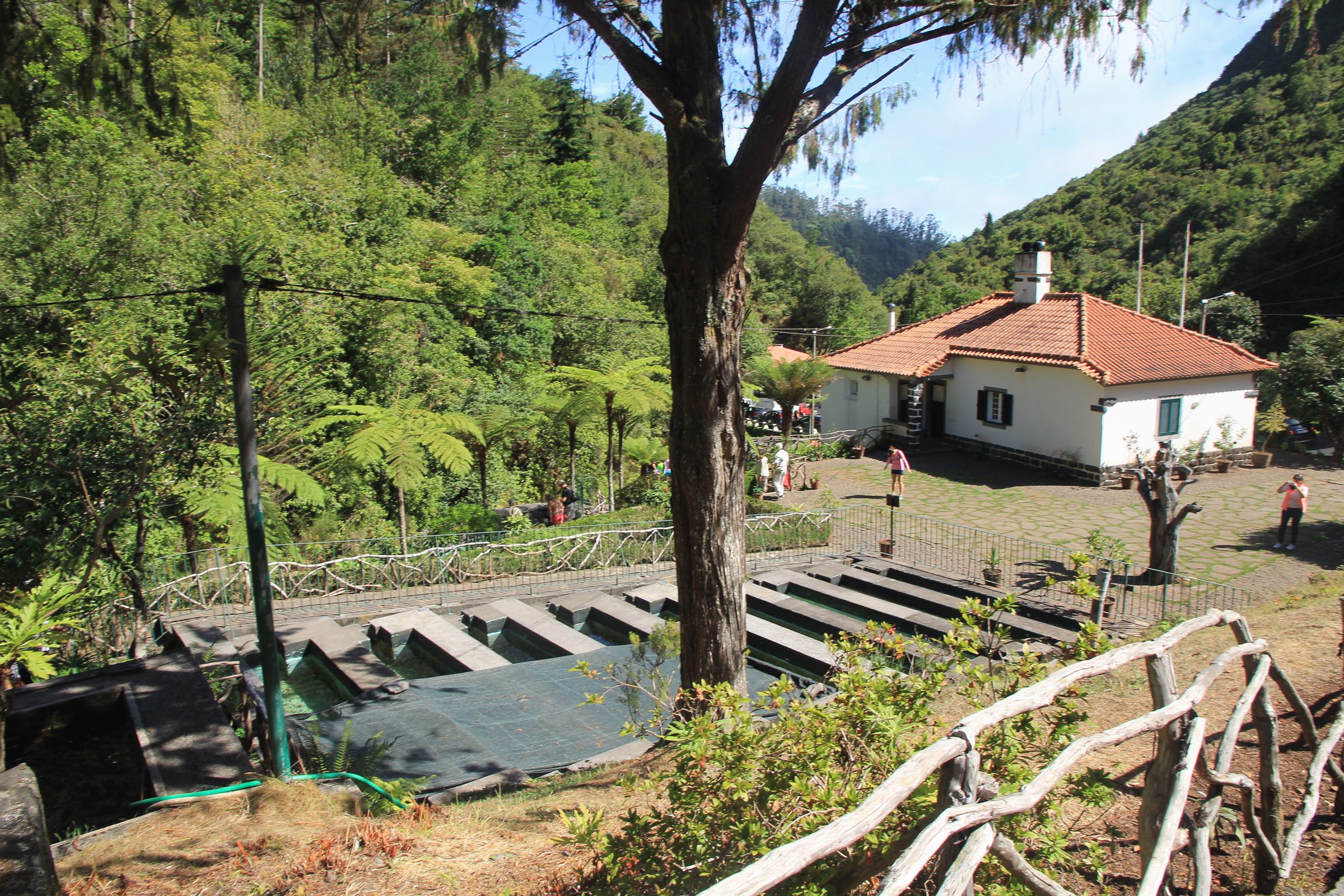
Trout farm

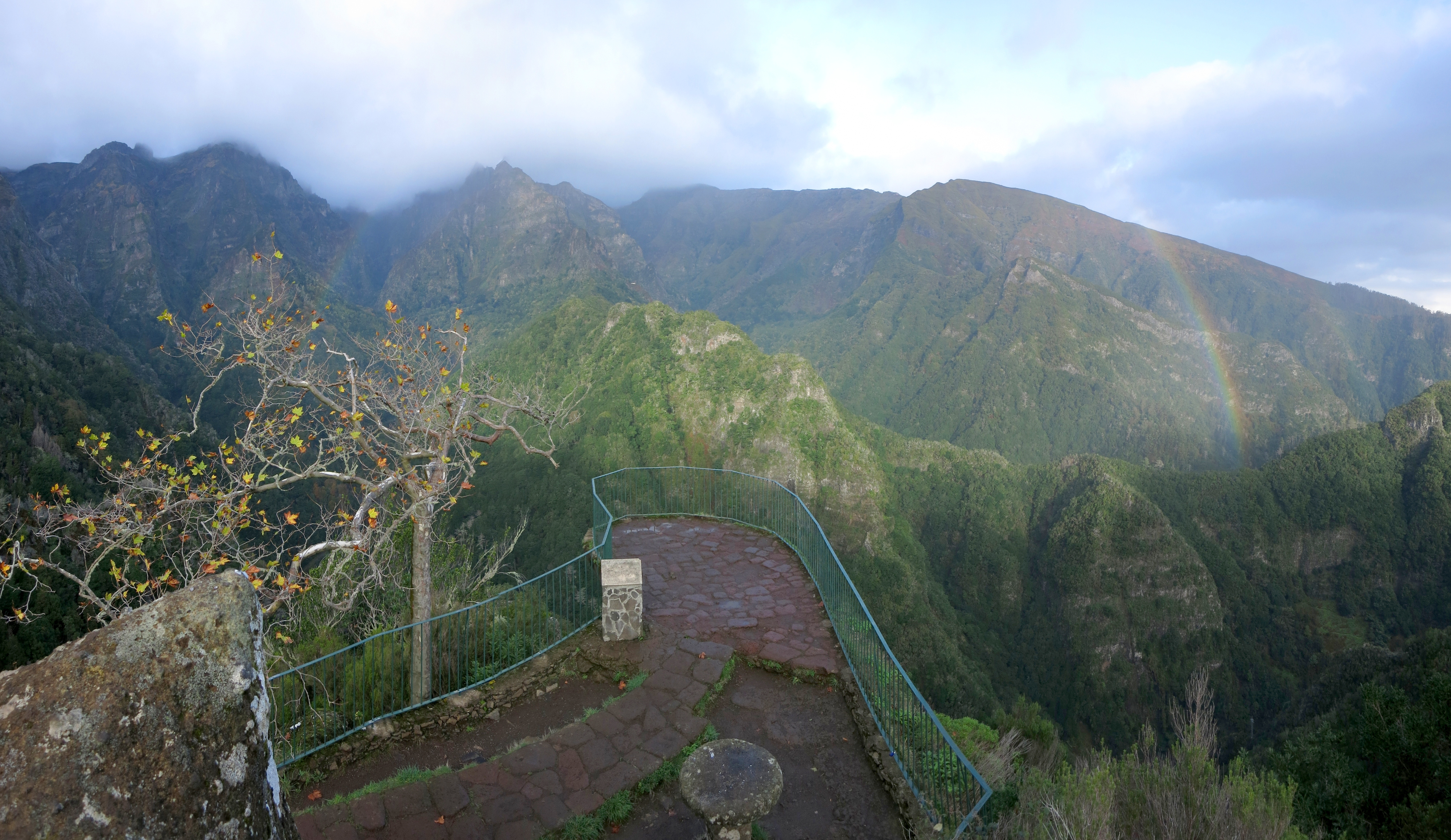
Balcões
