= São Roque do Faial =

- Civil parish
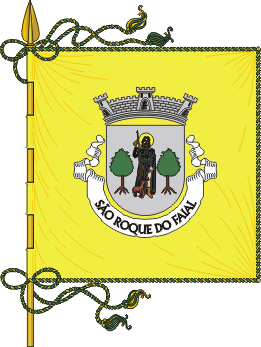
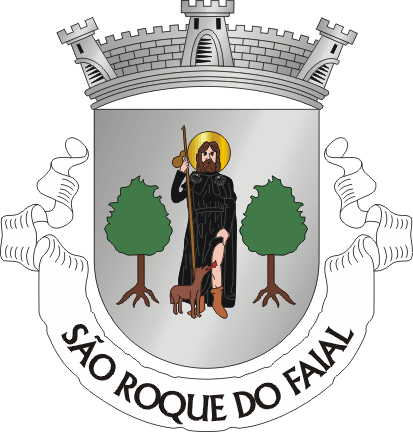
- Flag Coat of arms

- Location in Madeira
- Coordinates: 32.770°N 16.857°W
- Country: Portugal
- Auton. region: Madeira
- Municipality: Santana

Area
  - Total: 15.61 km^{2} (6.03 sq mi)

Population (2011)
  - Total: 736
  - Density: 47.1/km^{2} (122/sq mi)
- Time zone: UTC+00:00 (WET)
  - Summer (DST): UTC+01:00 (WEST)

São Roque do Faial is a parish in the municipality of Santana on the island of Madeira. The population in 2011 was 736, in an area of 15.61 km^{2}. It is located 3 km southeast of Santana.

== Administrative districts ==
- Achada do Cedro Gordo
- Achada do Folhadal
- Cancela
- Chão do Cedro Gordo
- Fajã do Cedro Gordo
- Lombo Grande
- Lombo dos Palheiros
- Pico do Cedro Gordo
- Ribeiro Frio
- Serradinho
- Terreiros
