= Risco waterfall =

Risco Waterfall
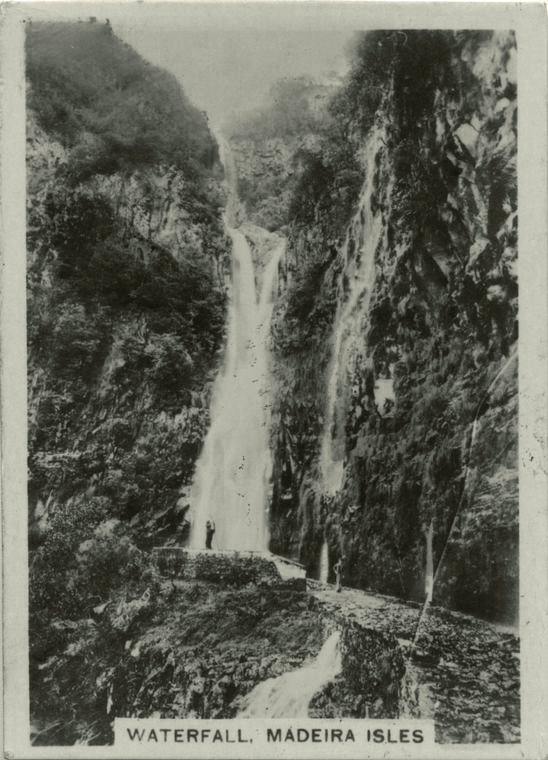
- Risco Waterfall on Madeira, Portugal

- Location within Madeira
- Location: Rabaçal, Paul da Serra, Madeira, Portugal
- Coordinates: 32°45′36.1″N 17°07′23.1″W
- Total height: 100 m (330 ft)

The Risco Waterfall ("Risco" meaning risk in English) is a group of waterfalls located in Rabaçal, Paul da Serra, in the Madeira Islands.

The waterfall is 100m high, consisting of a group of different water streams coming vertically down the mountainside. At its foot there are rocks covered in small plants and a small natural pool.

== See also ==
- List of waterfalls
- Geography of Portugal
