= Paul da Serra =

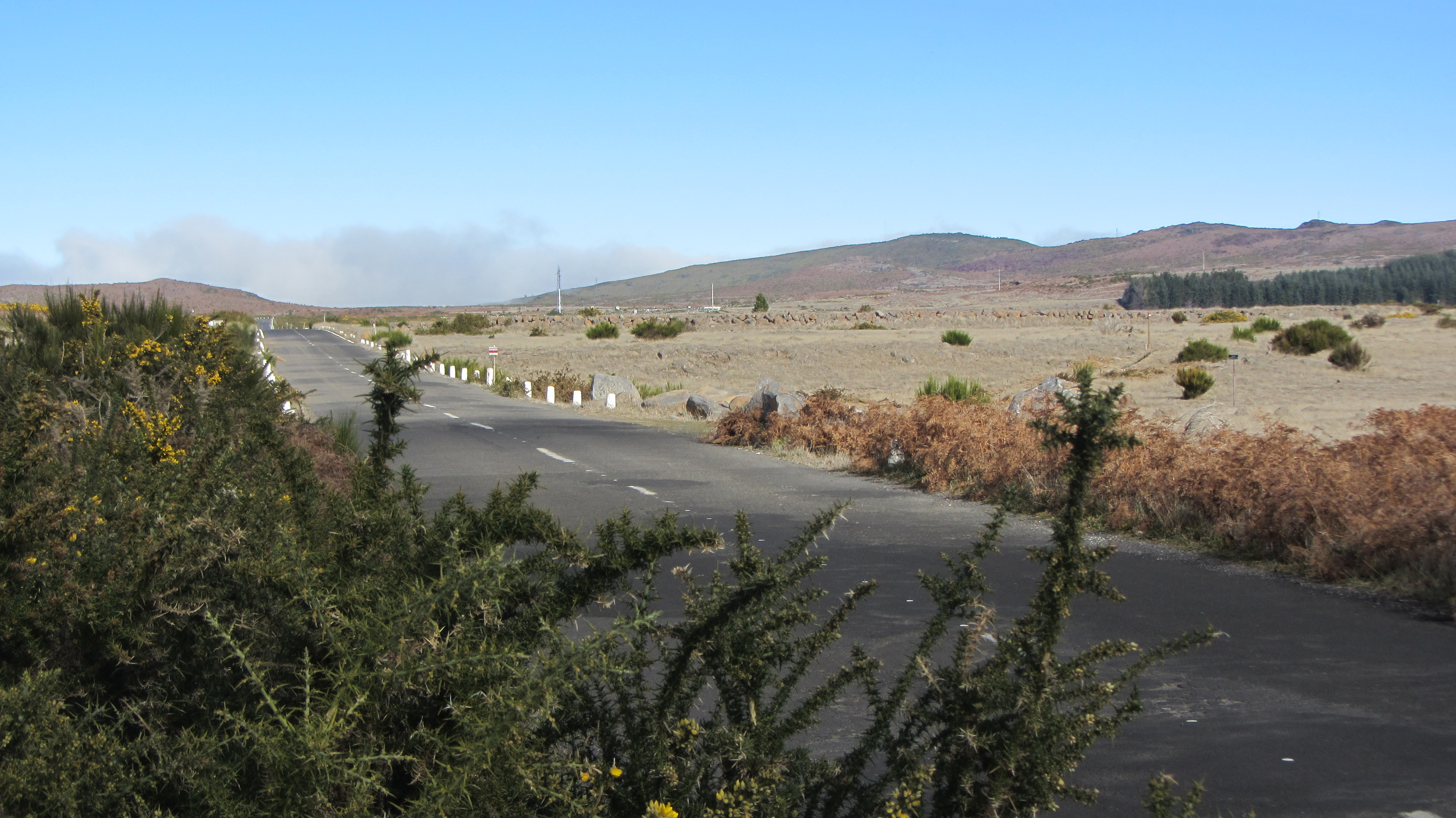

Highest point
- Peak: Pico do Paul
- Elevation: 1,640 m (5,380 ft)
- Coordinates: 32.7333°N 17.0500°W

Geography
- Location within Madeira
- Countries: Madeira, Portugal

Paul da Serra in the municipal county of Ponta do Sol, Madeira, is the largest and most extensive plateau of Madeira, at about 24 km^{2} (9.3 sq mi), with an altitude averaging about 1,500 m (4,900 ft). Its highest point is the peak pico do Paul at 1,640 m (5,380 ft) from where the length of the entire plateau can be viewed. On days with good visibility, both the south and north coasts are visible.

Paul da Serra is considered the most important area of the islands groundwater recharge, and their planar structure facilitates the infiltration of a significant part of high rainfall year, while slowing the runoff towards the sea.

The ground cover in almost all the Paul da Serra is composed of underbrush, reminiscent of its former use as grazing site, stressing among other the Feiteira (Pteridium aquilinum), highland bent, (Agrostis castellana), broom (Cytisus scoparius ssp. scoparius, C. striatus and C. multiflorus), the gorse (Ulex europaeus ssp. latebracteatus and U. minor), St. John's wort (Hypericum perforatum) or pelicão (Hypericum linarifolium and H. humifusum) and Thymus micans, an endemic species of Madeira, confined to the central mountain massif.

With the abandonment of grazing due to government policies for environmental recovery, the island's mountains can be seen recovering, slowly but consistently, vegetation thought to be the original, before slaughter by the colonizers. This vegetation, mainly composed of heather species Erica arborea and Erica platycodon ssp. maderincola, heathland form of altitude sized tree up to 9 m (30 ft) high, as observed in the area of Bica da Cana, in the northeast of the plateau. However, the cedar-of-Madeira (Juniperus cedrus ssp. maderensis) that should have been part of that original vegetation, hardly will again take its place.

As a flat area, it is favorable to the installation of wind farms. Virtually all wind energy produced on the island comes from these.

== Climate ==
Paul da Serra has a Mediterranean climate (Köppen: Csb) with a surprisingly high amount of precipitation (mostly due to the high air humidity, which precipitates with colder temperatures) and more than 240 foggy days a year.

Climate data for Paul da Serra, 1951-1980
Month	Jan	Feb	Mar	Apr	May	Jun	Jul	Aug	Sep	Oct	Nov	Dec	Year
Record high °C (°F)	20.0 (68.0)	20.2 (68.4)	22.8 (73.0)	24.6 (76.3)	25.8 (78.4)	24.5 (76.1)	31.8 (89.2)	32.0 (89.6)	30.8 (87.4)	24.8 (76.6)	21.2 (70.2)	20.2 (68.4)	32.0 (89.6)
Daily mean °C (°F)	5.6 (42.1)	5.4 (41.7)	6.0 (42.8)	6.4 (43.5)	8.8 (47.8)	10.8 (51.4)	14.0 (57.2)	14.7 (58.5)	12.7 (54.9)	10.4 (50.7)	7.8 (46.0)	6.0 (42.8)	9.1 (48.3)
Record low °C (°F)	−2.1 (28.2)	−3.2 (26.2)	−2.7 (27.1)	−2.5 (27.5)	−1.6 (29.1)	0.3 (32.5)	3.1 (37.6)	4.2 (39.6)	1.2 (34.2)	1.6 (34.9)	−1.3 (29.7)	−1.5 (29.3)	−3.2 (26.2)
Average precipitation mm (inches)	450.0 (17.72)	381.0 (15.00)	339.0 (13.35)	206.0 (8.11)	132.0 (5.20)	84.8 (3.34)	26.8 (1.06)	40.5 (1.59)	118.0 (4.65)	332.0 (13.07)	412.0 (16.22)	433.0 (17.05)	2,955.1 (116.36)
Average snowy days	1.7	2.7	3.1	1.4	0.2	0	0	0	0	0	0.3	1.4	10.8
Average relative humidity (%)	85	85	81	80	77	76	65	67	78	86	88	87	80
Source: São Vicente Municipality

== Gallery ==
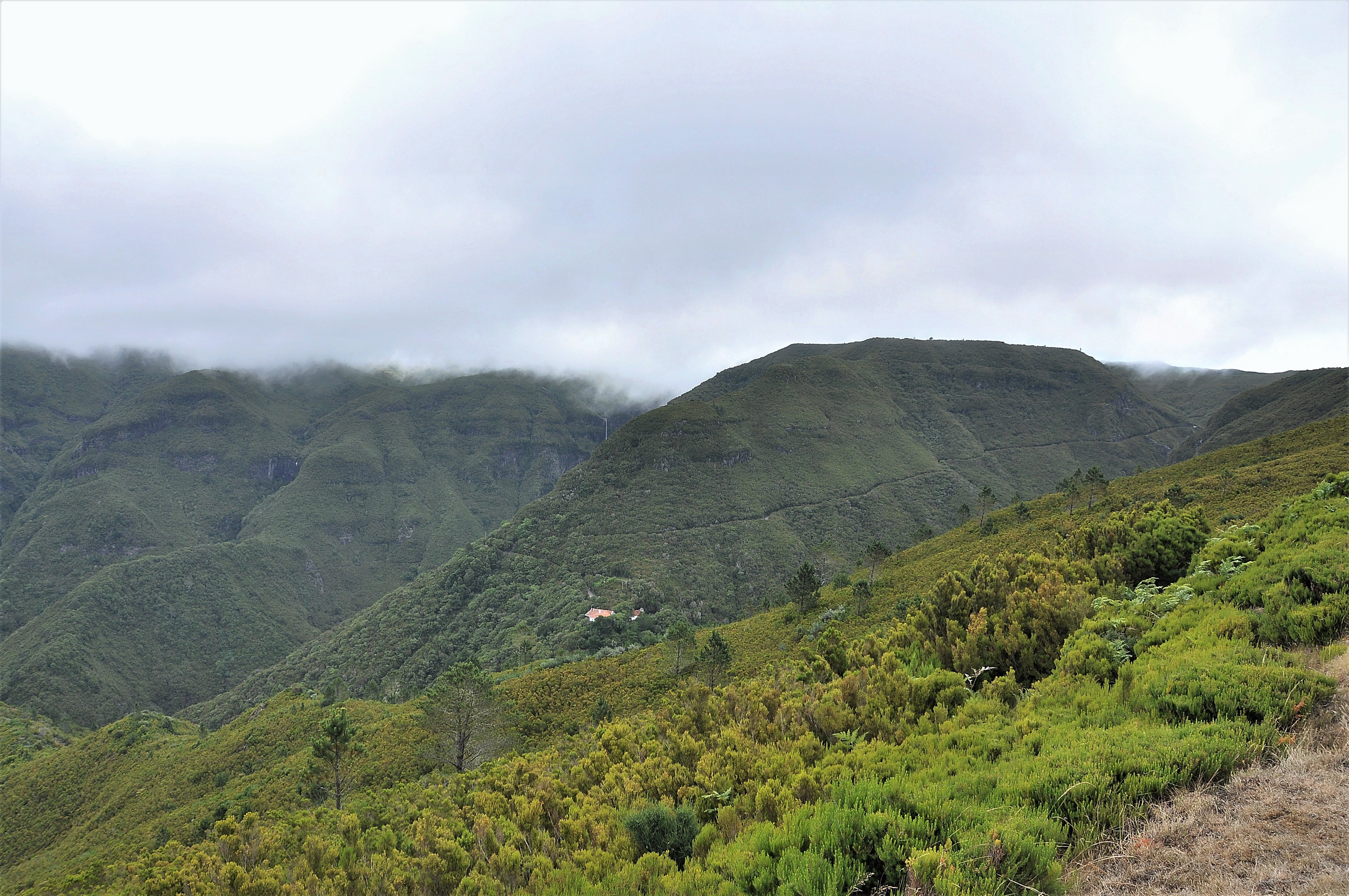

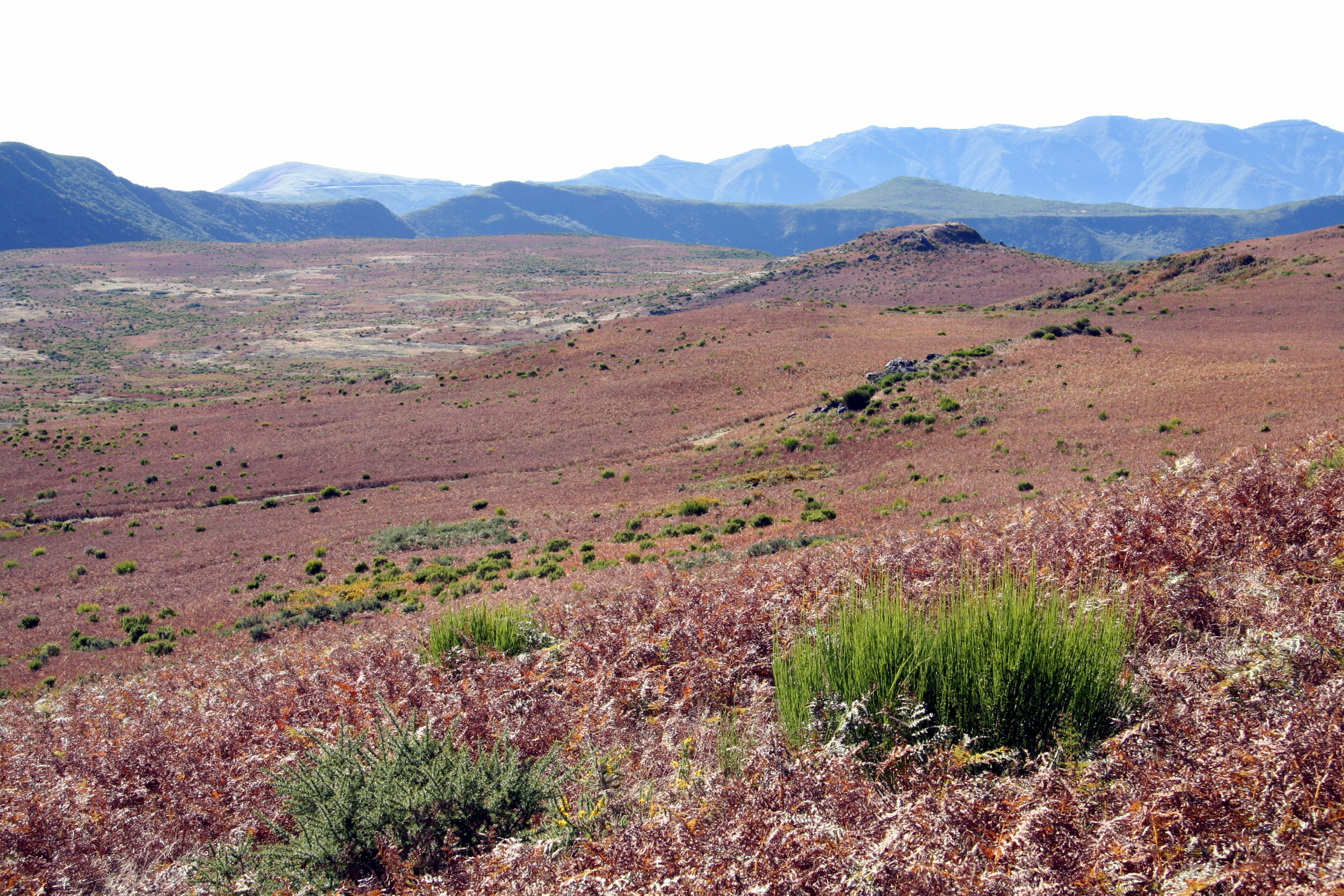

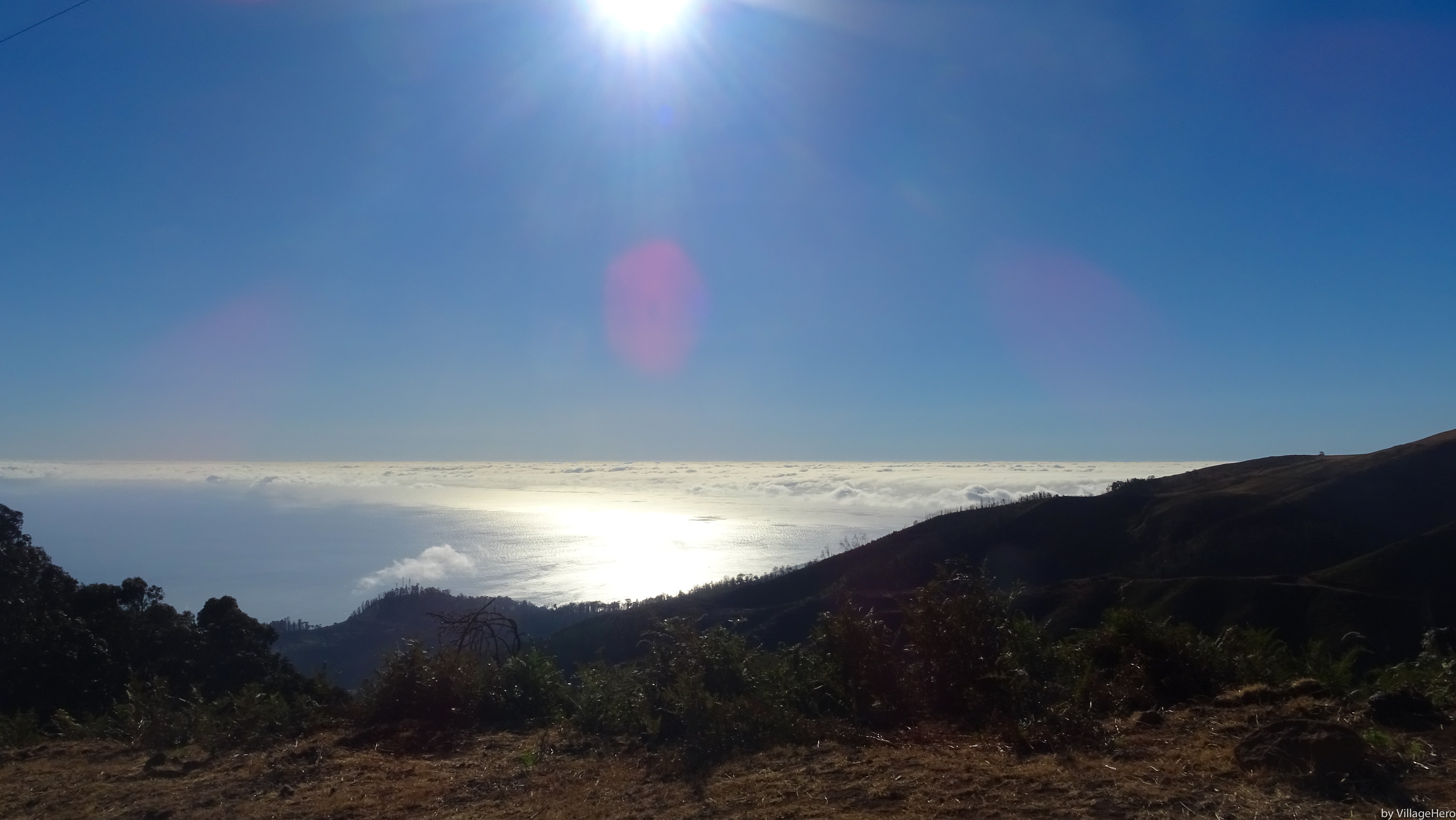
